= Wilfred van Leeuwen =

Dutch football manager

Personal information
- Date of birth: 17 May 1973 (age 53)
- Place of birth: Sassenheim, Netherlands

Managerial career
- Years: Team
- 2003–2010: Westlandia
- 2010–2011: Quick Boys
- 2013–2017: VVSB
- 2017–2018: Eindhoven
- 2018–2019: Rijnsburgse Boys

Wilfred van Leeuwen (born 17 May 1973) is a Dutch football manager, who most recently was the manager of Tweede Divisie club Rijnsburgse Boys.

As a coach of VVSB he won the Rinus Michels Award. In professional football, he briefly worked as an assistant coach for Sparta Rotterdam in 2003 and in the 2017–2018 season managed FC Eindhoven – both in the Eerste Divisie. In December 2017, he was appointed the new head coach of Rijnsburgse Boys in the Tweede Divisie starting from the 2018–19 season.
