= List of UEFA Cup and Europa League–winning managers =

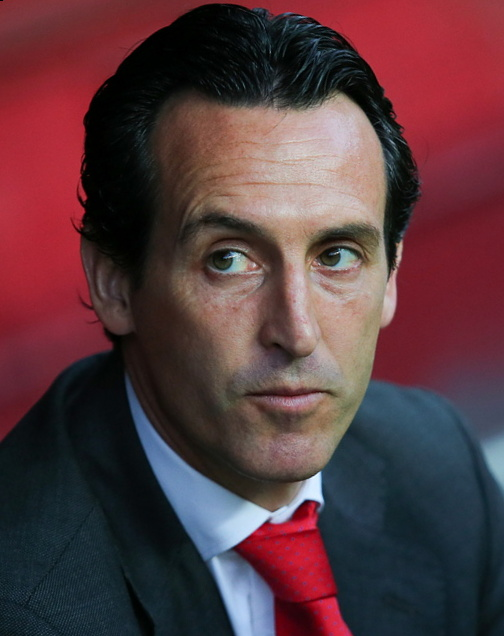
Unai Emery is a record five-time winner of the competition as manager.

The UEFA Europa League, known as the UEFA Cup before 2009, is a European association football competition contested since 1971. English manager Bill Nicholson led Tottenham Hotspur to victory in the inaugural final, an all-English encounter against Wolverhampton Wanderers. For the first 25 years of the competition, the final was contested over two legs, one at each club's stadium. In 1998, Luigi Simoni led Inter Milan to victory over Lazio in the competition's first single-legged final held at a neutral venue, the Parc des Princes in Paris.

Since the 2010s, the finals have been dominated by Spanish managers, who achieved nine victories between 2010 and 2026; Spanish managers have also won the most overall titles, fourteen. Twelve managers have won the title in charge of teams from a country other than their own; the most recent was Spaniard Unai Emery as manager of English club Aston Villa.

Only seven managers have won the competition more than once. Unai Emery is a record five-time winner: he won three consecutive editions with Sevilla in 2014, 2015 and 2016, and another two titles with Villarreal and Aston Villa in 2021 and 2026, respectively. Three-time winner Giovanni Trapattoni led Juventus to victory in 1977, Inter Milan in 1991, and Juventus once again in 1993, and Luis Molowny led Real Madrid to consecutive wins in 1985 and 1986, as did fellow Spaniard Juande Ramos who managed Sevilla to victory in both the 2006 and 2007 UEFA Cup finals. Rafael Benítez became the first manager to win the competition as both the UEFA Cup (in 2004) and as the Europa League (in 2013), a feat later achieved by José Mourinho, who won the UEFA Cup with Porto in 2003 and the Europa League with Manchester United in 2017. Diego Simeone won in 2012 and 2018, both times with Atlético Madrid.

== List ==
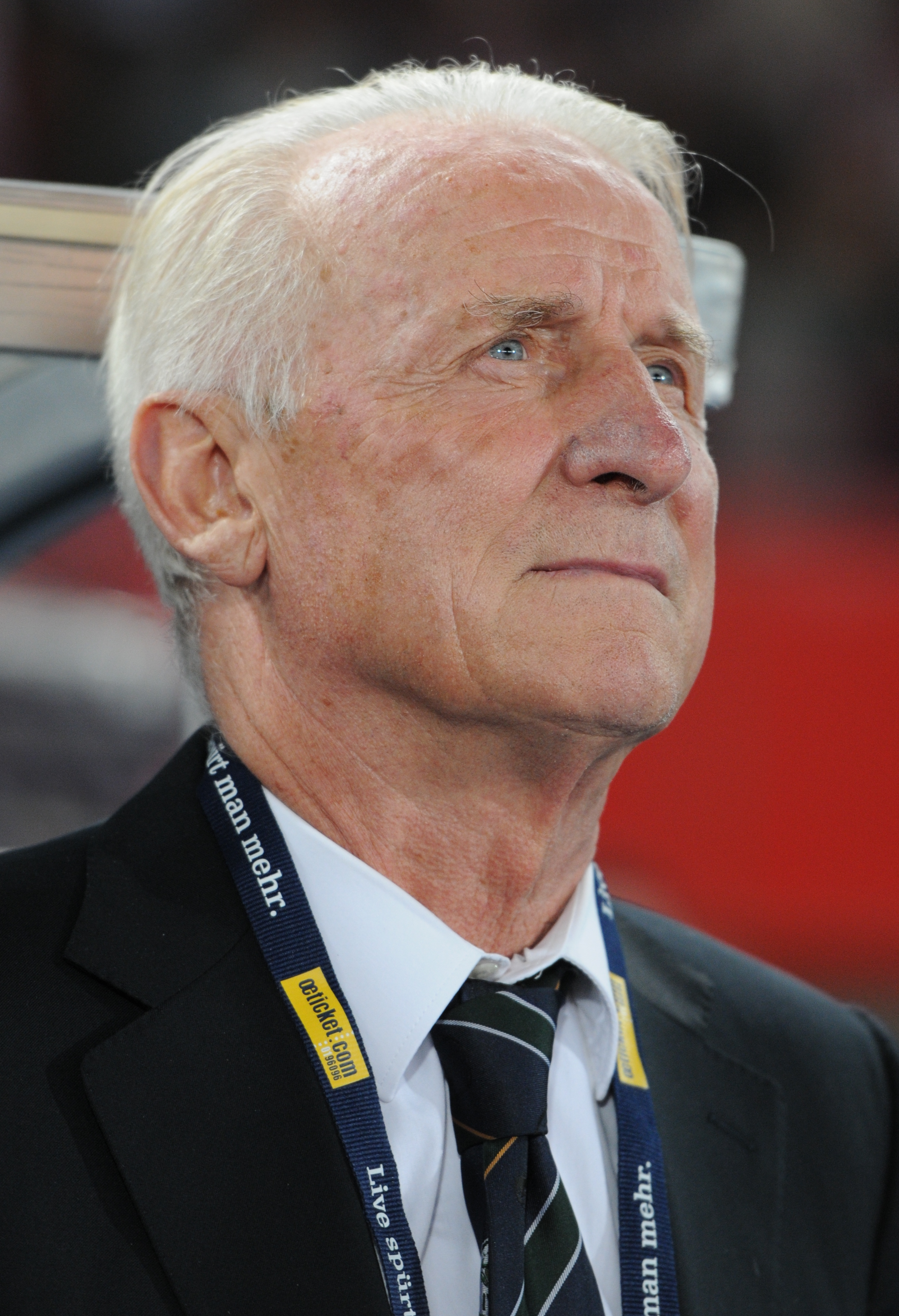
Giovanni Trapattoni, three-time winner in 1977 and 1991 and 1993

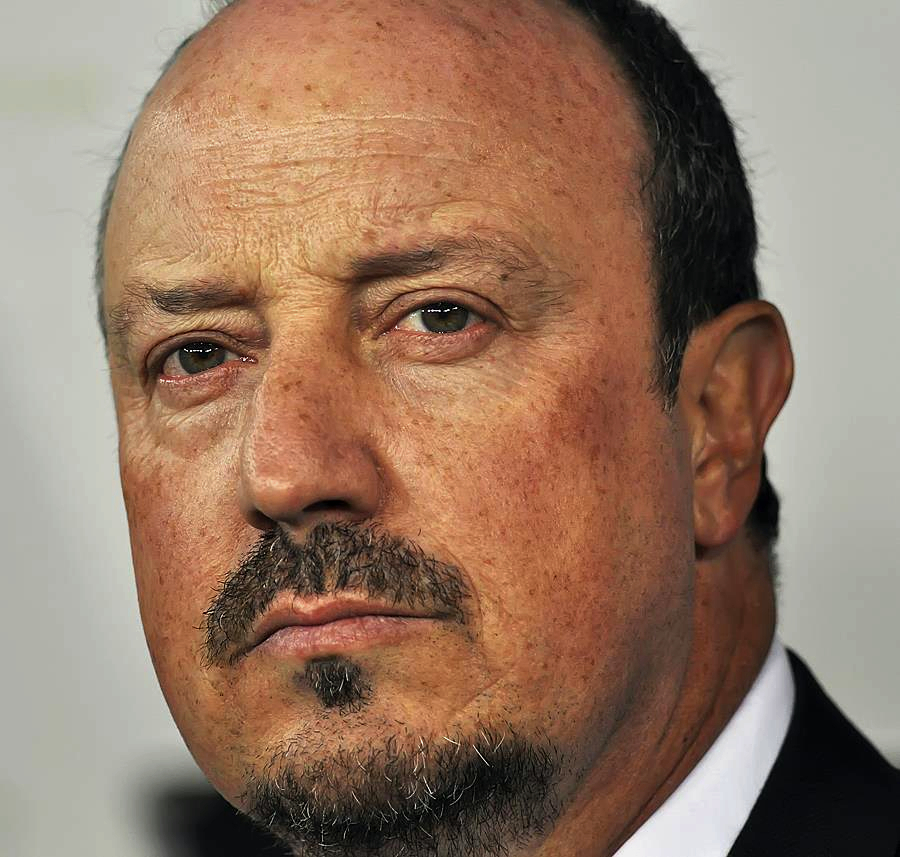
Rafael Benítez, winning manager in 2004 and 2013, also became the second manager to win the cup with two different teams.

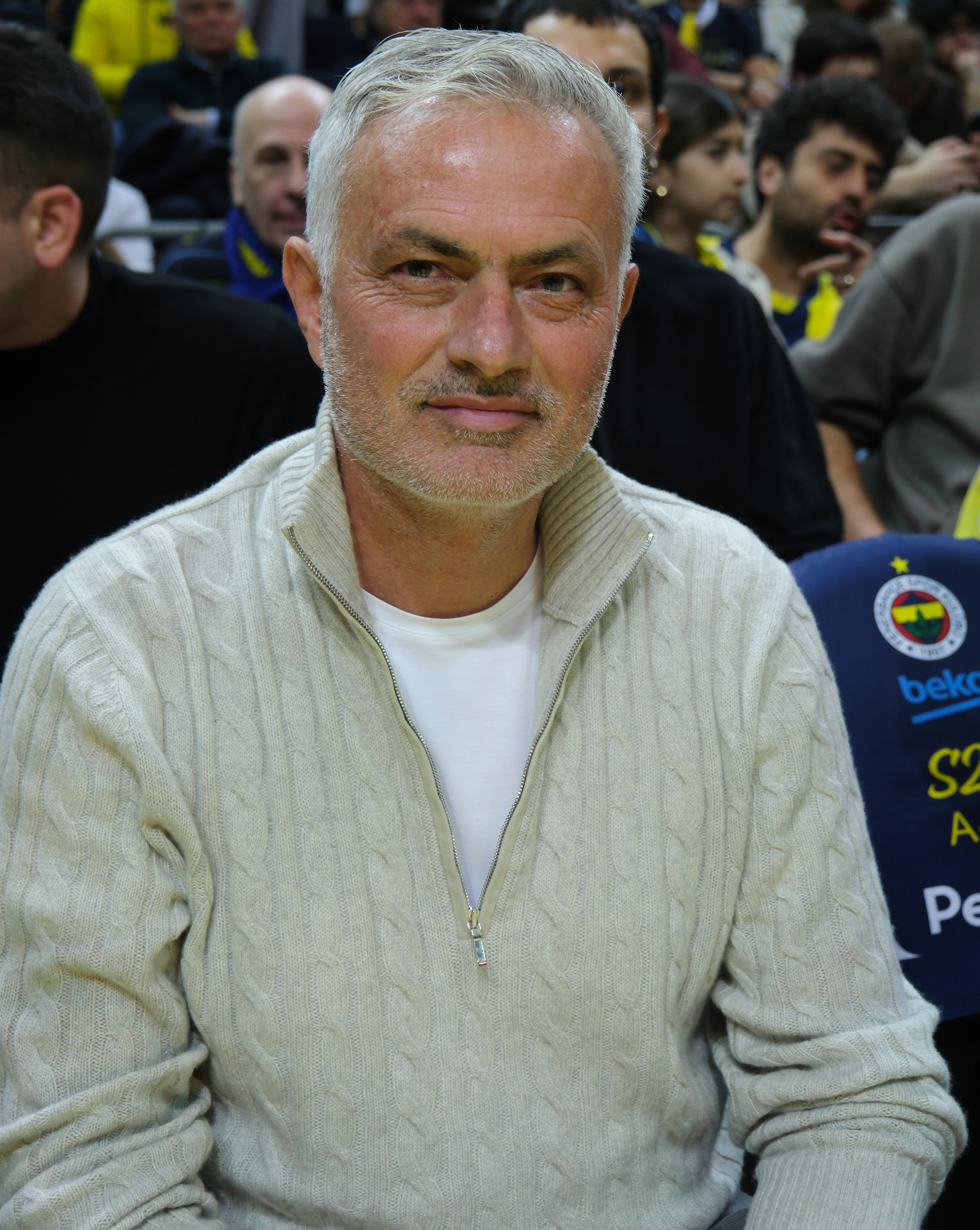
José Mourinho, winning manager in 2003 and 2017

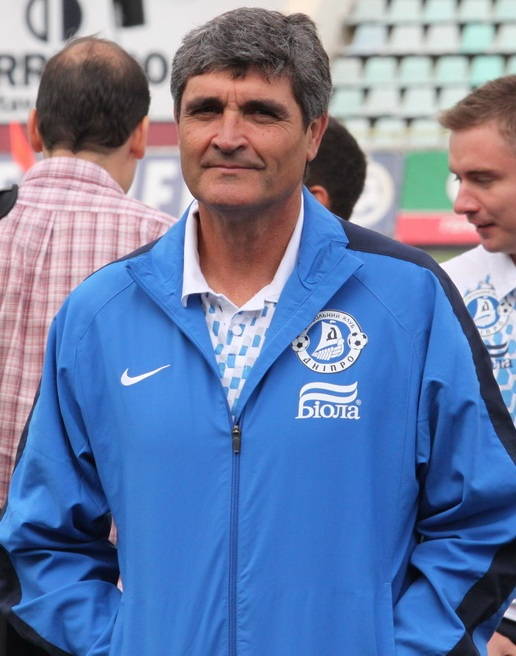
Juande Ramos, winning manager in 2006 and 2007

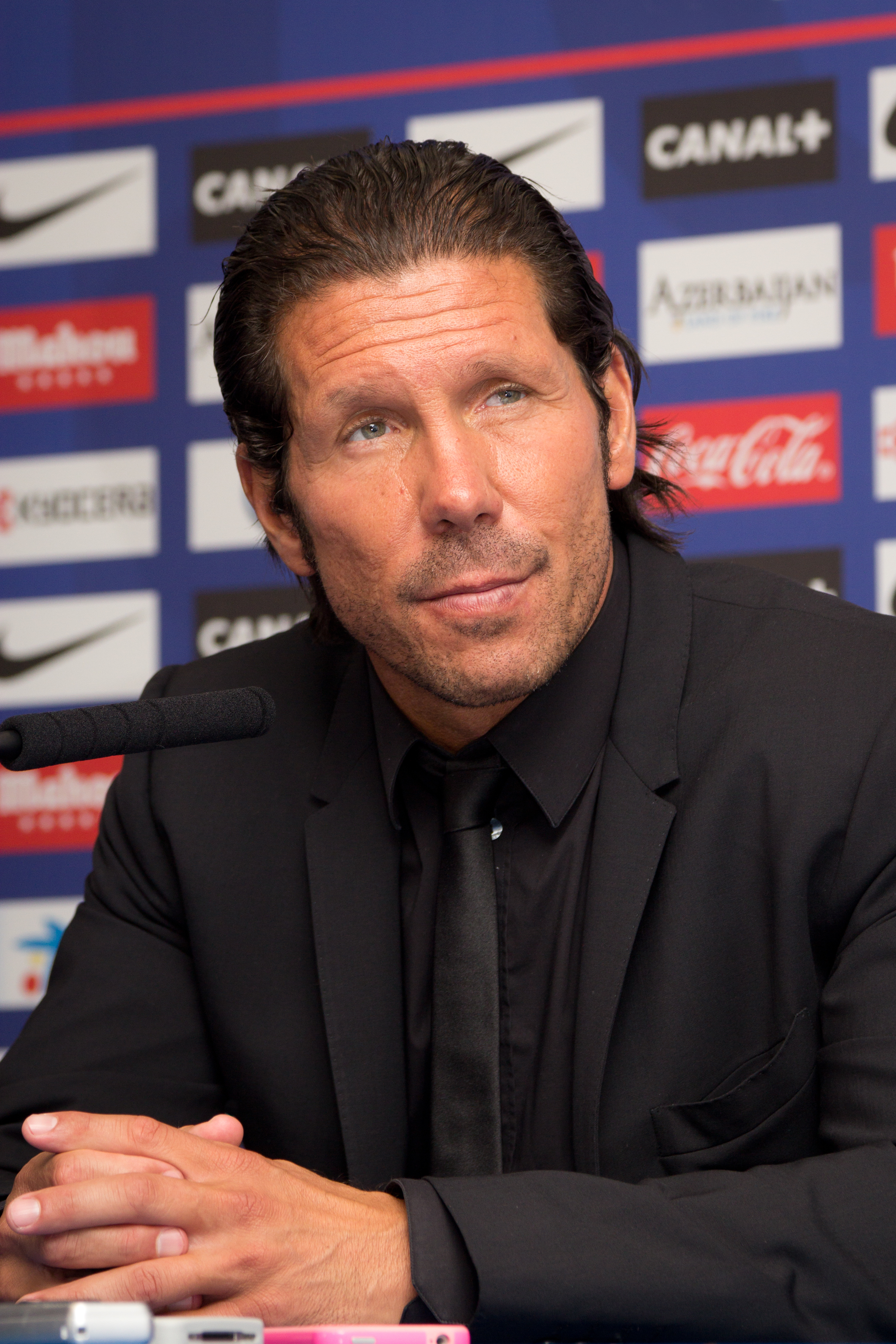
Diego Simeone, winning manager in 2012 and 2018

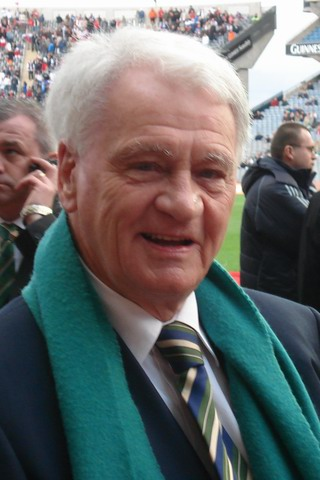
Bobby Robson, winning manager in 1981

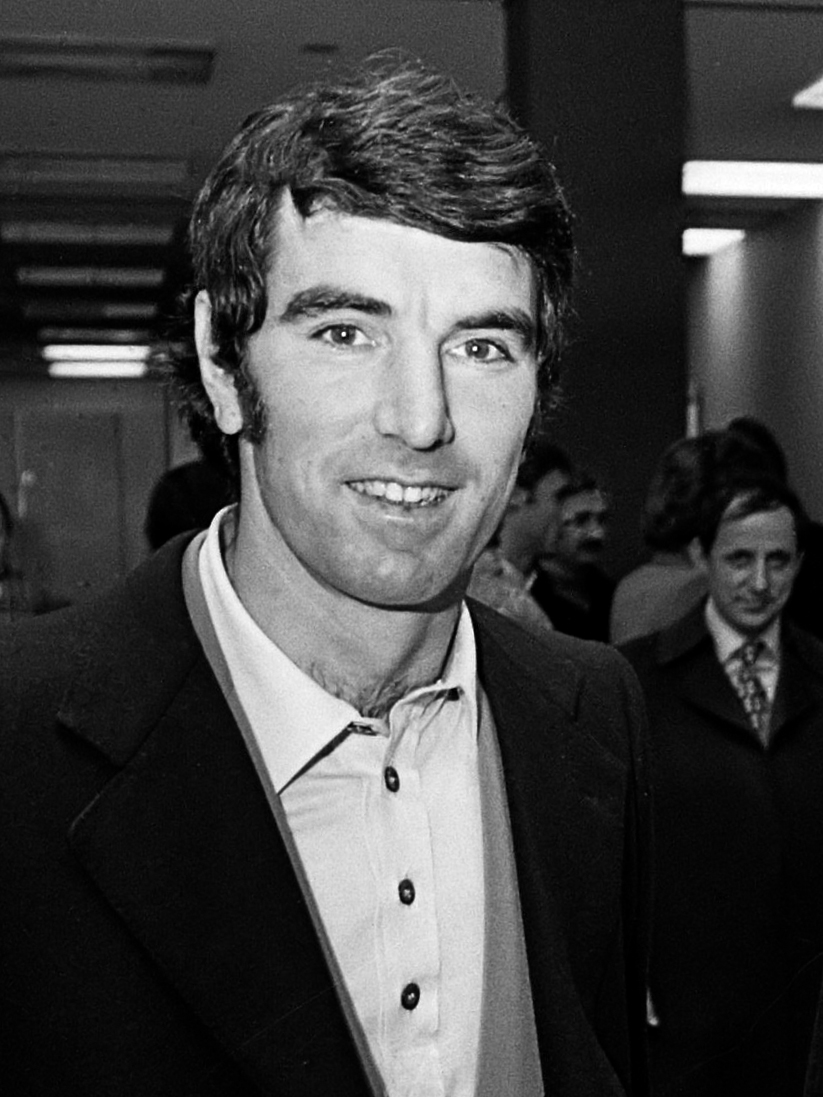
Dino Zoff, winning manager in 1990

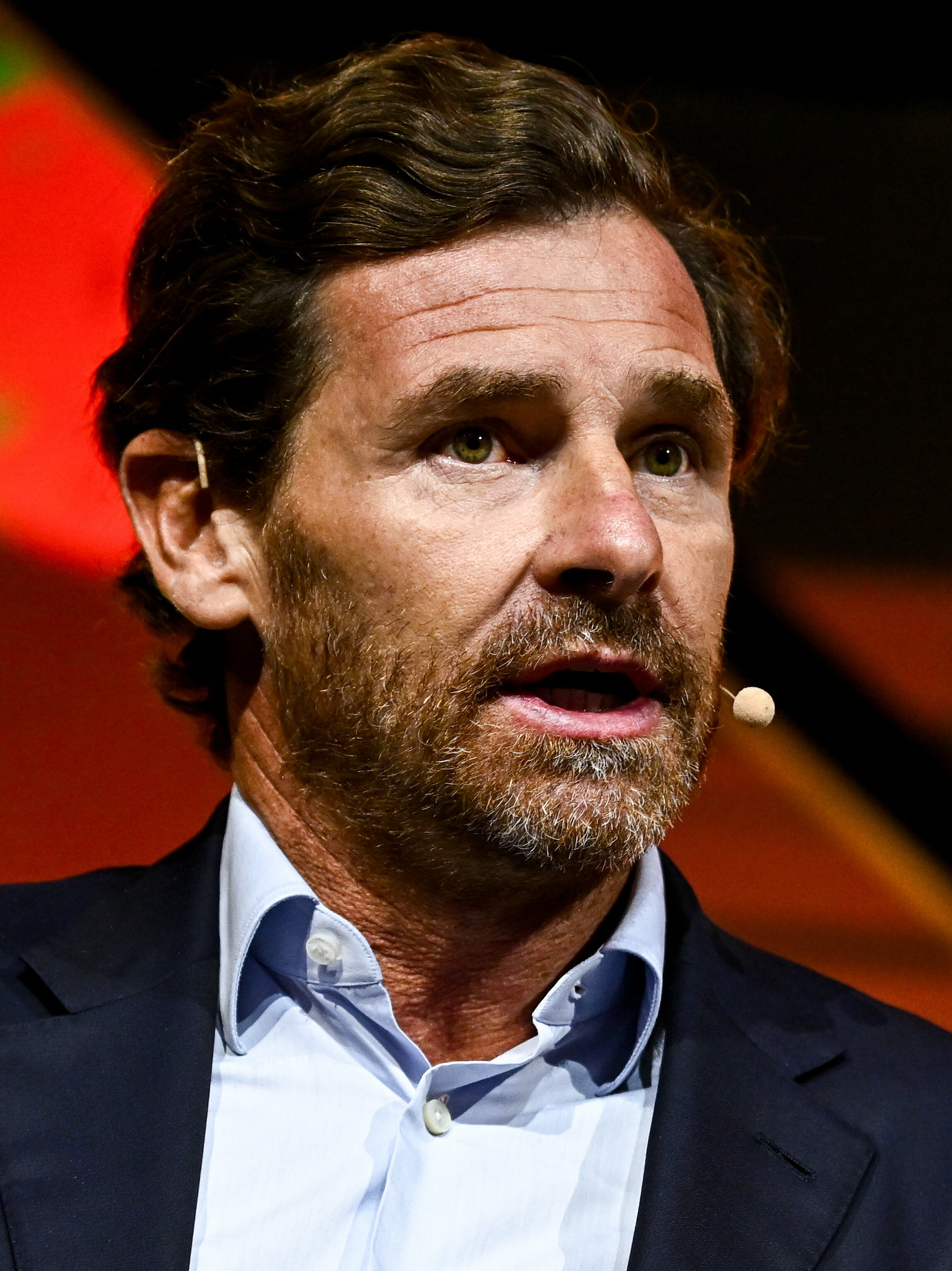
André Villas-Boas, winning manager in 2011, and the youngest manager ever to win a European competition, at age 33

=== By year ===
UEFA Cup and Europa League winning managers
Final	Nationality	Winning manager	Nation	Club	Ref.
1972	England	Bill Nicholson	England	Tottenham Hotspur	
1973	Scotland	Bill Shankly	England	Liverpool	
1974	Netherlands	Wiel Coerver	Netherlands	Feyenoord	
1975	West Germany	Hennes Weisweiler	West Germany	Borussia Mönchengladbach	
1976	England	Bob Paisley	England	Liverpool	
1977	Italy	Giovanni Trapattoni	Italy	Juventus	
1978	Netherlands	Kees Rijvers	Netherlands	PSV Eindhoven	
1979	West Germany	Udo Lattek	West Germany	Borussia Mönchengladbach	
1980	West Germany	Friedel Rausch	West Germany	Eintracht Frankfurt	
1981	England	Bobby Robson	England	Ipswich Town	
1982	Sweden	Sven-Göran Eriksson	Sweden	IFK Göteborg	
1983	Belgium	Paul Van Himst	Belgium	Anderlecht	
1984	England	Keith Burkinshaw	England	Tottenham Hotspur	
1985	Spain	Luis Molowny	Spain	Real Madrid	
1986	Spain	Luis Molowny	Spain	Real Madrid	
1987	Sweden	Gunder Bengtsson	Sweden	IFK Göteborg	
1988	West Germany	Erich Ribbeck	West Germany	Bayer Leverkusen	
1989	Italy	Ottavio Bianchi	Italy	Napoli	
1990	Italy	Dino Zoff	Italy	Juventus	
1991	Italy	Giovanni Trapattoni	Italy	Inter Milan	
1992	Netherlands	Louis van Gaal	Netherlands	Ajax	
1993	Italy	Giovanni Trapattoni	Italy	Juventus	
1994	Italy	Giampiero Marini	Italy	Inter Milan	
1995	Italy	Nevio Scala	Italy	Parma	
1996	Germany	Franz Beckenbauer	Germany	Bayern Munich	
1997	Netherlands	Huub Stevens	Germany	Schalke 04	
1998	Italy	Luigi Simoni	Italy	Inter Milan	
1999	Italy	Alberto Malesani	Italy	Parma	
2000	Turkey	Fatih Terim	Turkey	Galatasaray	
2001	France	Gérard Houllier	England	Liverpool	
2002	Netherlands	Bert van Marwijk	Netherlands	Feyenoord	
2003	Portugal	José Mourinho	Portugal	Porto	
2004	Spain	Rafael Benítez	Spain	Valencia	
2005	Russia	Valery Gazzaev	Russia	CSKA Moscow	
2006	Spain	Juande Ramos	Spain	Sevilla	
2007	Spain	Juande Ramos	Spain	Sevilla	
2008	Netherlands	Dick Advocaat	Russia	Zenit Saint Petersburg	
2009	Romania	Mircea Lucescu	Ukraine	Shakhtar Donetsk	
2010	Spain	Quique Sánchez Flores	Spain	Atlético Madrid	
2011	Portugal	André Villas-Boas	Portugal	Porto	
2012	Argentina	Diego Simeone	Spain	Atlético Madrid	
2013	Spain	Rafael Benítez	England	Chelsea	
2014	Spain	Unai Emery	Spain	Sevilla	
2015	Spain	Unai Emery	Spain	Sevilla	
2016	Spain	Unai Emery	Spain	Sevilla	
2017	Portugal	José Mourinho	England	Manchester United	
2018	Argentina	Diego Simeone	Spain	Atlético Madrid	
2019	Italy	Maurizio Sarri	England	Chelsea	
2020	Spain	Julen Lopetegui	Spain	Sevilla	
2021	Spain	Unai Emery	Spain	Villarreal	
2022	Austria	Oliver Glasner	Germany	Eintracht Frankfurt	
2023	Spain	José Luis Mendilibar	Spain	Sevilla	
2024	Italy	Gian Piero Gasperini	Italy	Atalanta	
2025	Australia	Ange Postecoglou	England	Tottenham Hotspur	
2026	Spain	Unai Emery	England	Aston Villa	

=== Managers with multiple titles ===
Managers who have won multiple UEFA Cups/Europa Leagues
Rank	Nationality	Manager	Number of wins	Years won	Club(s)
1	Spain	Unai Emery	5	2014, 2015, 2016, 2021, 2026	Sevilla (3), Villarreal, Aston Villa
2	Italy	Giovanni Trapattoni	3	1977, 1991, 1993	Juventus (2), Inter Milan
3	Spain	Luis Molowny	2	1985, 1986	Real Madrid
3	Spain	Juande Ramos	2	2006, 2007	Sevilla
3	Spain	Rafael Benítez	2	2004, 2013	Valencia, Chelsea
3	Portugal	José Mourinho	2	2003, 2017	Porto, Manchester United
3	Argentina	Diego Simeone	2	2012, 2018	Atlético Madrid

=== By nationality ===
This table lists the total number of titles won by managers of each nationality.

UEFA Cup and Europa League winning managers by nationality
Nationality	Number of wins
Spain	14
Italy	11
Netherlands	6
Germany (Note: Includes West Germany.)	5
England	4
Portugal	3
Argentina	2
Sweden	2
Australia	1
Austria	1
Belgium	1
France	1
Romania	1
Russia	1
Scotland	1
Turkey	1

== See also ==
- UEFA Cup and Europa League records and statistics
- List of UEFA Cup and Europa League finals
