= Co Adriaanse =

Dutch footballer and manager (born 1947)

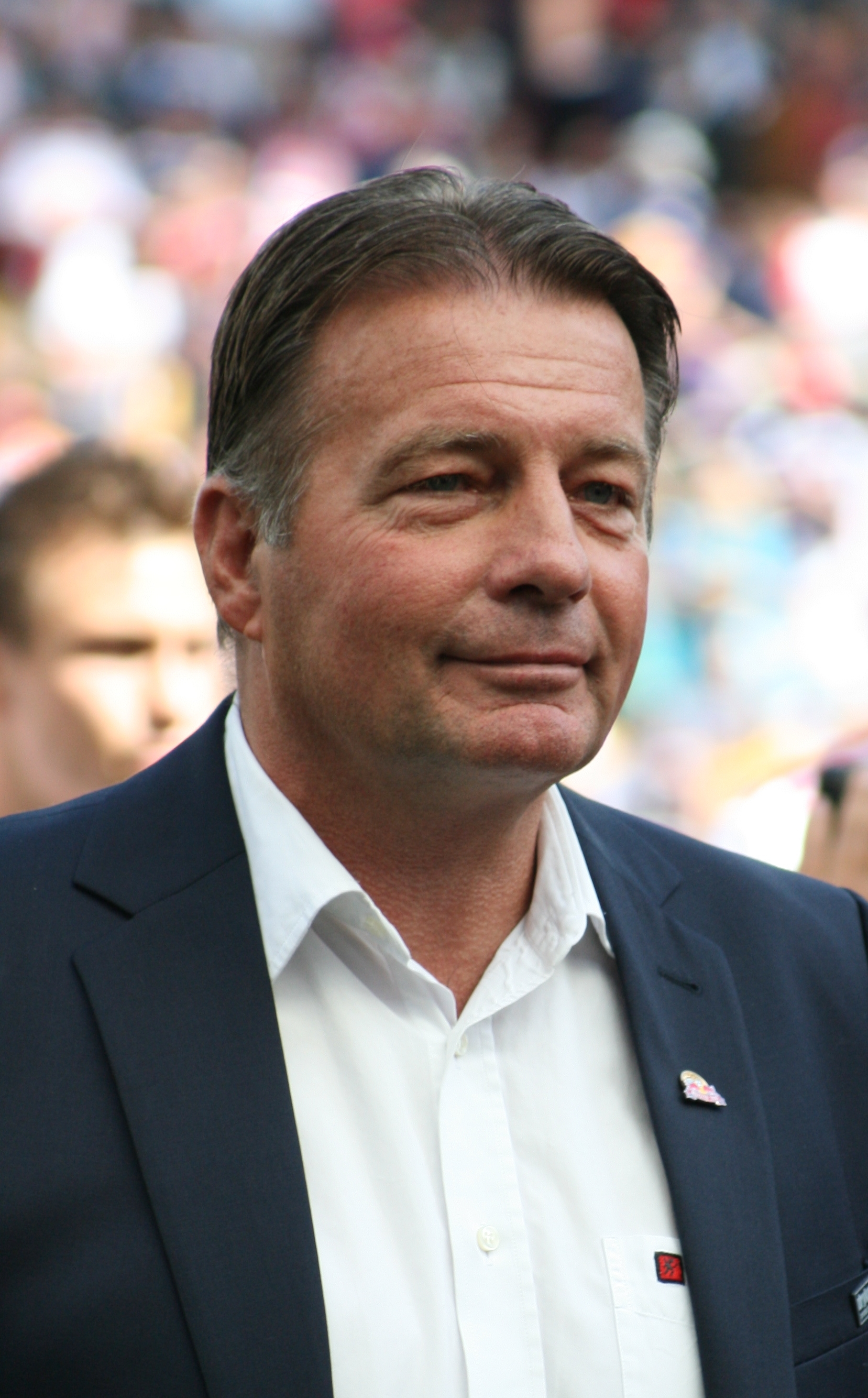
- Adriaanse in 2009

Personal information
- Full name: Jacobus Adriaanse
- Date of birth: 21 July 1947 (age 79)
- Place of birth: Amsterdam, Netherlands
- Position: Centre-back

Senior career*
Years	Team	Apps	(Gls)
1964–1970	De Volewijckers	148	(6)
1970–1976	Utrecht	176	(0)
Total		324	(6)

Managerial career
- 1984–1988: PEC Zwolle
- 1988–1992: FC Den Haag
- 1992–1997: Jong Ajax
- 1997–2000: Willem II
- 2000–2001: Ajax
- 2002–2005: AZ
- 2005–2006: Porto
- 2006–2007: Metalurh Donetsk
- 2007–2008: Al-Sadd
- 2008–2009: Red Bull Salzburg
- 2010–2011: Qatar (olympic)
- 2011–2012: Twente
- * Club domestic league appearances and goals

Jacobus "Co" Adriaanse (born 21 July 1947) is a Dutch football manager and former player who played as a centre-back.

== Playing career ==
As a professional player, Adriaanse played for six seasons with De Volewijckers (from 1964 until 1970) and a further six seasons with Utrecht (1970 until 1976), retiring from football at age 29.

== Managerial career ==
=== Early career ===
Adriaanse began his managing career with Zilvermeeuwen in 1979, and after four years he joined AZ for the first time as scout and youth trainer. After a year, for the 1984–85 season he resumed his coaching career with two four-year stints with PEC Zwolle and FC Den Haag, where he would be sacked for the first time. He was then chosen to direct the youth side of Ajax, a position he would occupy for five seasons.

=== Willem II ===
In 1997, Adriaanse was appointed manager of Willem II. There, he implemented an – according to him – "compelling, aggressive style that can always be maintained". In his first season, the team finished in fifth place and booked impressive wins over Feyenoord (2–0) and defending champions PSV (4–1). The fifth place meant that the club qualified for European football for the first time since 1963.

In their run in the 1998–99 UEFA Cup, Willem II managed to knock out Dinamo Tbilisi in the first round 6–0 on aggregate, but lost to Real Betis in the second round. The club had a weak start to their domestic season, and held an 11th place in the league table at the winter break. A strong second half of the season, however, saw them finishing in second place after beating eventual champions Feyenoord 4–1 and Ajax 3–1. This meant that Willem II, a team better known for finishing in the bottom half of the Eredivisie, would be competing in the UEFA Champions League. The team, however, finished bottom of their 1999–2000 UEFA Champions League group stage, and after failing to achieve another European spot, Adriaanse resigned on 20 May 2000.

=== Ajax ===
Adriaanse returned to Ajax as manager, but after a third place season he was released early in the next season, on 29 November 2001, after a string of poor results. During his tenure, he made a number of controversial statements to the press – he called chairman of PSV, Harry van Raaij, a "talking lampshade", and most famously said of Marco van Basten who was rumoured to join the Ajax staff at the time: "A good horse does not make a good jockey."

=== AZ ===
After beginning the 2002–03 season without a club, Adriaanse was signed to AZ in November 2002. A tenth-place finish in the first season was followed by a fifth-placed finish, which allowed the Alkmaar team to join the UEFA Cup in the 2004–05 season. There, the club upset Spanish side and top contenders Villarreal in the quarter-finals before being knocked out on away goals in the semi-finals by Sporting CP, in the final minute of extra time. In the Eredivisie, AZ also performed above expectations, finishing third after topping the league for a week at the end of the first half and spending most of the second in second place. Adriaanse again coined a number of colourful phrases while at AZ, the best known being "Scoreboard journalism", "Cheese viewers", "Woonerf football" and "Evening footballer".

=== Porto ===
After much speculation and his stated desire to leave the club (he was succeeded by Louis van Gaal), on 24 May 2005, Adriaanse was presented as the new manager of Portuguese club Porto (replacing José Couceiro), and became the fourth manager to sign for the Portuguese side since the departure of José Mourinho. In the first season as Porto coach, he achieved the "Dobradinha" for the first time since the departure of Mourinho, winning the Primeira Liga and the Taça de Portugal.

=== Metalurh Donetsk ===
On 9 August 2006, Adriaanse resigned as manager of Porto. Four months later, he became coach of Ukrainian club Metalurh Donetsk. On 17 May 2007, Adriaanse resigned as manager of Metalurh Donetsk with four games to play in the Ukrainian Premier League.

=== Al-Sadd Sports Club ===
On 27 August 2007, Adriaanse signed a one-year deal with Al-Sadd and resigned as coach on 28 January 2008.

=== Red Bull Salzburg ===
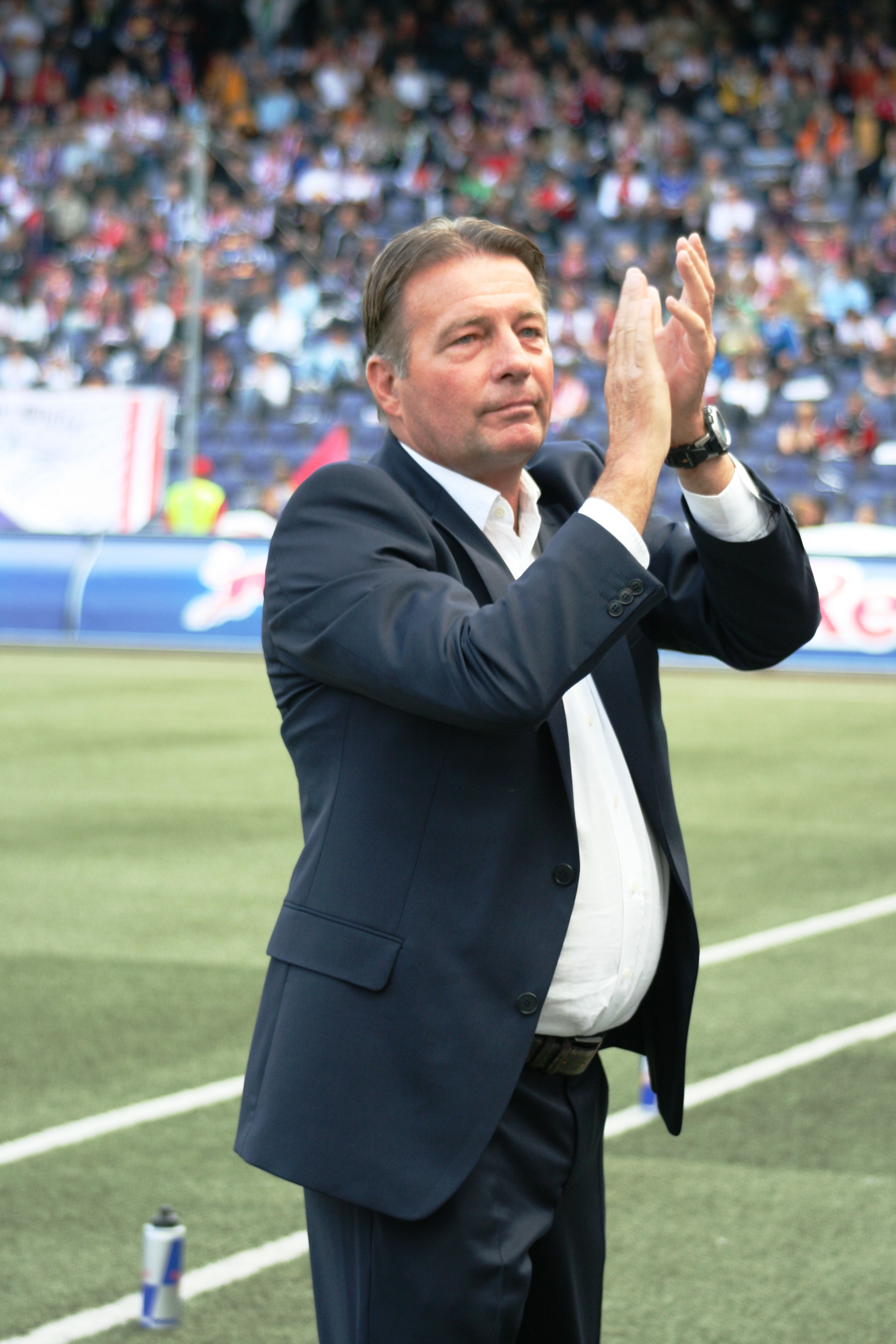
Adriaanse in 2009

On 13 March 2008, Adriaanse signed a two-year deal with the Austrian champion Red Bull Salzburg and he left the club after the end of his contract on 30 June 2009.

=== Qatar Olympic team ===
On 12 January 2010, it was confirmed Adriaanse's appointment at the helm of the Qatar Olympic team. His Middle East stint, however, lasted only 14 months, as his contract was terminated by mutual consent in March 2011.

=== Twente ===
On 20 June 2011, Twente announced on their website to have appointed Adriaanse as new trainer in place of departing manager Michel Preud'homme. In his first official match with the club, Adriaanse won the Johan Cruyff Shield against former team Ajax. On 3 January 2012, Adriaanse, halfway through a one-season contract, was terminated by Twente.

In the 2014–15 season, Adriaanse acted as technical advisor at Utrecht. He also decided to leave the club at the end of the season when manager Rob Alflen announced his resignation.

== Managerial style ==
=== Tactical approach ===
Adriaanse gained attention in the Netherlands after leading Willem II to qualification for the UEFA Champions League. The team frequently employed an attacking style of play, an approach Adriaanse continued to utilise later during his managerial career.

=== Training ===
Adriaanse is famous for his controversial training approach. At Willem II, he once ordered his whole squad to follow him by car, while they drove 13 km away from their training ground. At a remote spot, all players had to give their car keys to Adriaanse. Then he drove back to town, while the squad had to run in front of his car. Back at the training ground, the players got their car keys back. Since their cars were still parked far from the training ground, however, they all had to walk back another 13 km. At AZ Alkmaar, he once ordered the whole squad to search for Easter eggs during a training session. They looked for an hour until Adriaanse finally revealed there were no eggs hidden. Adriaanse already had these strange training methods at the start of his career, because when he was a youth trainer at Ajax, he sometimes ordered his players to lie on the ground. Then a teammate with football boots on would run over the bodies. Because of all these infamous incidents, Adriaanse has been referred to as "Psycho Co".

== Honours ==
=== As a manager ===
Porto

- Primeira Liga: 2005–06
- Taça de Portugal: 2005–06

Red Bull Salzburg

- Austrian Football Bundesliga: 2008–09

Twente

- Johan Cruyff Shield: 2011

Individual

- Rinus Michels Award: 2004
- Primeira Liga's Manager of the Season: 2006
- Rinus Michels Lifetime Achievement Award (Rinus Michels Oeuvreprijs): 2017
