= Erwin van de Looi =

Dutch footballer and manager (born 1972)

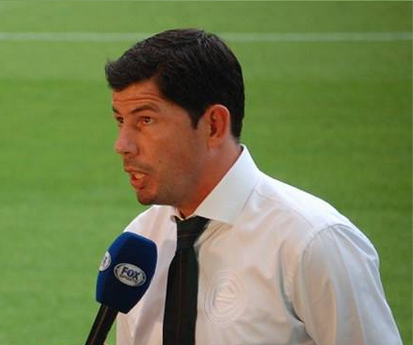
- Van de Looi as manager of Groningen in 2014

Personal information
- Full name: Erwin van de Looi
- Date of birth: 25 February 1972 (age 54)
- Place of birth: Huissen, Netherlands
- Height: 1.91 m (6 ft 3 in)
- Position: Centre-back

Team information
- Current team: Volendam (head coach)

Youth career
- RKHVV
- Vitesse 1892

Senior career*
Years	Team	Apps	(Gls)
1991–1997	Vitesse	133	(2)
1991–1992	→ BVV Den Bosch (loan)	8	(0)
1997–1999	NAC	47	(1)
2000–2000	Stuttgarter Kickers	7	(0)
2000–2002	Groningen	19	(0)
Total		214	(3)

Managerial career
- 2008–2010: Groningen (U21)
- 2010–2013: Groningen (assistant)
- 2013–2016: Groningen
- 2016–2018: Willem II
- 2018–2023: Netherlands U21
- 2020: Netherlands (assistant ad int.)
- 2023–2025: Heracles Almelo
- 2025: Olimpija Ljubljana
- 2026–: Volendam
- * Club domestic league appearances and goals

Erwin van de Looi (born 25 February 1972) is a Dutch professional football manager and former player who is the head coach of Eerste Divisie club Volendam.

== Playing career ==
Van de Looi played in the youth academies of RKHVV and Vitesse 1892 and made his professional debut for second-tier Eerste Divisie club BVV Den Bosch in 1992 as a loanee. After a season, in which he made few appearances, van de Looi was given an opportunity to play by Vitesse head coach Herbert Neumann. Van de Looi impressed and made 30 appearances in his first full season at the club. He would eventually make 133 appearances for Vitesse, whom he also represented in 10 UEFA Cup matches. Van de Looi was also selected once for the Netherlands national team during his time at the club, in a practice match against Portugal. However, he did not make an appearance during the match.

After five seasons, Van de Looi left for NAC before the start of the 1997–98 season. Partly due to injuries, van de Looi played relatively few games in his three seasons at NAC, with whom he also suffered relegation from the Eredivisie in 1999. In the winter break of the 1999–2000 season, van de Looi moved to German 2. Bundesliga club Stuttgarter Kickers. There, too, he could not regain his earlier form, and after another relegation he returned to the Netherlands after only six months in Germany – this time to newly promoted FC Groningen. In 2002, Van de Looi decided retire from football at the age of thirty due to injuries.

== Managerial career ==
=== Groningen ===
Van de Looi started his coaching career as head coach of FC Groningen U21 in 2008. Two years later, he became assistant manager of FC Groningen.

On 4 April 2013, it was announced that Van de Looi would become the new manager of the FC Groningen first team for the 2013–14 season, signing a two-year contract.

During the 2014–15 season, Van de Looi led FC Groningen through their most successful ever Dutch Cup campaign as they won it for the first time in the club's history by defeating cup holders PEC Zwolle 2–0 in the final. By winning the Dutch Cup, FC Groningen qualified for the 2015–16 UEFA Europa League group stages.

On 27 January 2016, it was announced that Van de Looi would leave the club at the end of the season.

=== Willem II ===
On 23 May 2016, Van de Looi was announced as the new manager of Dutch football club Willem II, signing a two-year contract. Before the end of the season and his contract at Willem II, supporters demanded the leave of Van de Looi through a manifesto. On 8 March 2018, Van de Looi decided to leave the club.

=== Netherlands U21 ===
On 21 May 2018, Van de Looi was announced as the new manager of the Netherlands national under-21 football team, signing a contract until the end of 2020 with the contract automatically being extended until the summer of 2021 if the Netherlands qualifies for the 2021 UEFA European Under-21 Championship. Van de Looi took over after Art Langeler, who moved to the position of Director of Football Development for the KNVB. In August 2020, Van de Looi was temporarily added to the staff of the Netherlands national team. The U21 would be temporarily coached by Marcel Groninger, his assistant.

=== Heracles Almelo ===
On 21 December 2023, Heracles Almelo appointed Van de Looi as the new head coach, replacing John Lammers. He left the club at the end of the 2024–25 season, after opting not to renew his contract.

=== Volendam ===
On 12 June 2026, Van de Looi was named head coach of Volendam for the 2026–27 season, replacing Rick Kruys following the club's relegation from the Eredivisie through the promotion–relegation play-offs.

== Honours ==
FC Groningen

- KNVB Cup: 2014–15

== Managerial statistics ==
As of 22 September 2025.

Team	From	To	Record							
Team	From	To	G	W	D	L	GF	GA	GD	Win %
FC Groningen	1 July 2013	30 June 2016	128	52	34	42	194	183	+11	40.63
Willem II	1 July 2016	8 March 2018	66	19	14	33	78	110	−32	28.79
Netherlands U21	1 July 2018	30 June 2023	39	23	12	4	96	25	+71	58.97
Heracles Almelo	21 December 2023	30 June 2025	57	18	14	25	74	104	−30	31.58
Olimpija	11 August 2025	22 September 2025	8	2	1	5	13	18	−5	25.00
Volendam	1 July 2026	Present	0	0	0	0	0	0	+0	—
Total			298	114	75	109	455	440	+15	38.26
