= Jan van Raalte =

Dutch footballer and manager

Jan van Raalte (Hattem, 12 August 1968) is a Dutch football manager of amateur squads and formerly a professional footballer, mostly in the Eerste Divisie and one season with Cambuur Leeuwarden in the Eredivisie. Van Raalte won the Rinus Michels Award for coaching amateur teams. He lives in Harkema where he finished his midfield player career.

== Football career ==
Van Raalte played four seasons for FC Zwolle, after which he played 1993 to 1995 for Cambuur Leeuwarden. Then Van Raalte played for Emmen. Starting in 1999, his last two seasons in the Eerste Divisie were at VVV Venlo, followed by three years for Harkemase Boys in the Hoofdklasse.

Until 2009 Van Raalte managed HHC Hardenberg. In 2012 he became the coach of VV Staphorst. Since 2016 he manages SC Genemuiden but has notified the club he will take a break from coaching starting summer 2019.

== Player statistics ==
Season	Club	Country	League	Caps	Goals
1989/90	PEC Zwolle '82	Netherlands	Eerste Divisie	32	1
1990/91	FC Zwolle	Netherlands	Eerste Divisie	33	0
1991/92	FC Zwolle	Netherlands	Eerste Divisie	34	3
1992/93	FC Zwolle	Netherlands	Eerste Divisie	31	1
1993/94	Cambuur Leeuwarden	Netherlands	Eredivisie	5	0
1994/95	Cambuur Leeuwarden	Netherlands	Eerste Divisie	25	1
1995/96	Emmen	Netherlands	Eerste Divisie	30	0
1996/97	Emmen	Netherlands	Eerste Divisie	32	2
1997/98	Emmen (captain)	Netherlands	Eerste Divisie	26	2
1998/99	Emmen	Netherlands	Eerste Divisie	15	0
1999/00	VVV	Netherlands	Eerste Divisie	30	0
2000/01	VVV (captain)	Netherlands	Eerste Divisie	31	0
			Totaal	324	10
