= Rinus Michels Award =

Annual prize in Dutch football

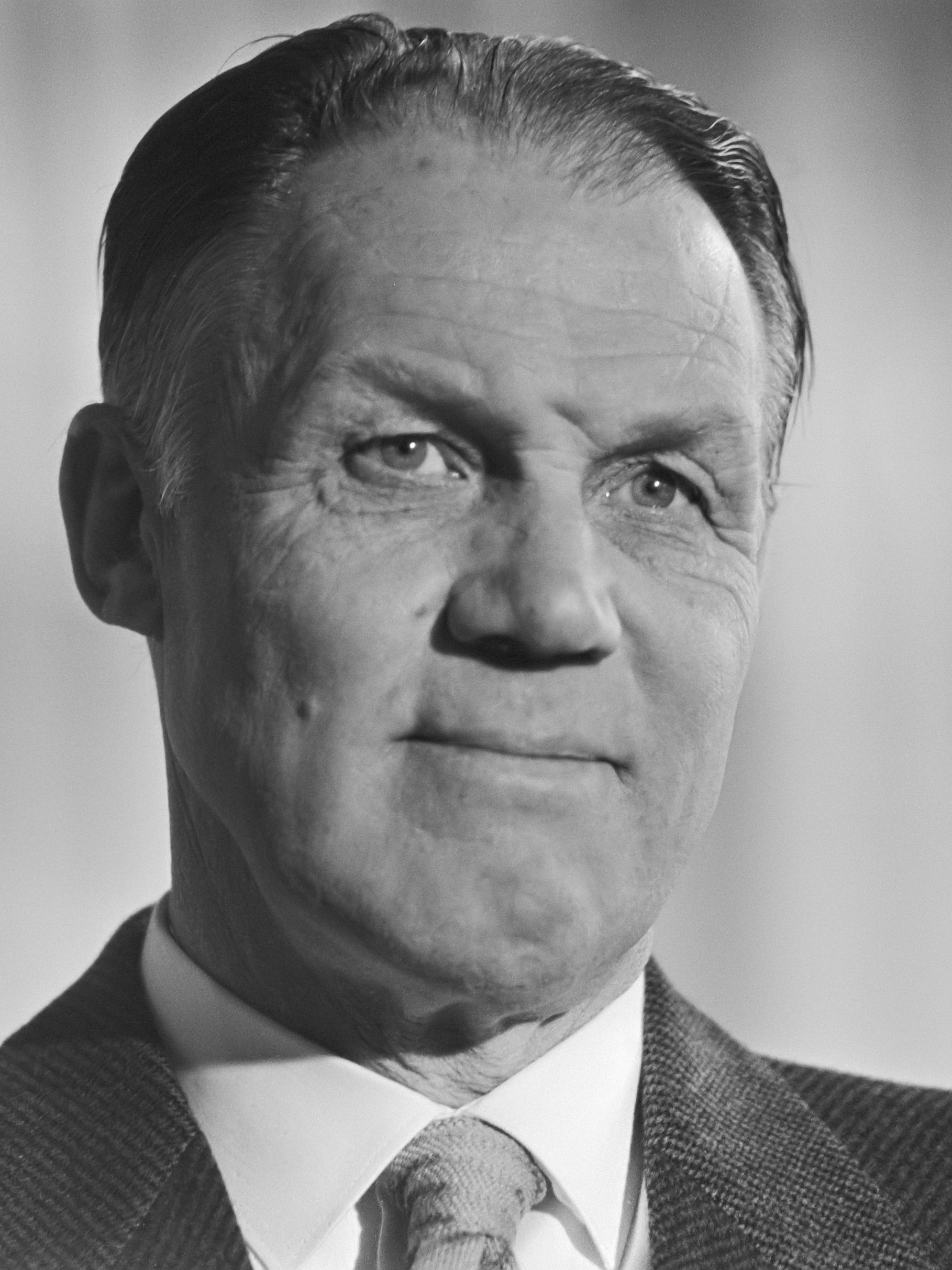
Rinus Michels

The Rinus Michels Award is an annual prize in Dutch football and is supported by the official football coaches union ("Coaches Betaald Voetbal" or CBV) and magazine De voetbaltrainer. The award is named after Rinus Michels, who was named coach of the century by FIFA in 1999.

== Categories ==
Annual awards are recognized in the following categories:

- Manager of the year in the Eredivisie
- Manager of the year in the Eerste Divisie (since 2017)
- Manager of the year in the Vrouwen Eredivisie (Women's Eredivisie) (since 2024)
- Lifetime Achievement Award (Oeuvreprijs) (ad hoc)

Since August 2025, also monthly awards for managers active in the Dutch Eredivisie are instated. This is a joint initiative by the Eredivisie, coaches union CBV, magazine De Voetbaltrainer and broadcaster ESPN.

=== Abolished categories ===
- Manager of the year in amateur football (awarded until 2019)
- Youth academies of the year in professional football (awarded until 2019)
- Youth academies of the year in amateur football (awarded until 2019)

== Winners Manager of the Year Eredivisie ==
The winners of the annual Rinus Michels Award can be found in the table below:

| Season | Best Coach | Club | Sources |
|---|---|---|---|
| 2003–04 | (Netherlands) Co Adriaanse | AZ | |
| 2004–05 | (Netherlands) Guus Hiddink | PSV | |
| 2005–06 | (Netherlands) Guus Hiddink | PSV | |
| 2006–07 | (Netherlands) Louis van Gaal | AZ | |
| 2007–08 | (Netherlands) Fred Rutten | Twente | |
| 2008–09 | (Netherlands) Louis van Gaal | AZ | |
| 2009–10 | (England) Steve McClaren | Twente | |
| 2010–11 | (Belgium) Michel Preud'homme | Twente | |
| 2011–12 | (Netherlands) Ronald Koeman | Feyenoord | |
| 2012–13 | (Netherlands) Frank de Boer | Ajax | |
| 2013–14 | (Netherlands) Frank de Boer | Ajax | |
| 2014–15 | (Netherlands) Phillip Cocu | PSV | |
| 2015–16 | (Netherlands) Erik ten Hag | Utrecht | |
| 2016–17 | (Netherlands) Peter Bosz | Ajax | |
| 2017–18 | (Netherlands) Phillip Cocu | PSV | |
| 2018–19 | (Netherlands) Erik ten Hag | Ajax | |
| 2019–20 | not awarded as season was terminated early due to COVID-19 pandemic | | |
| 2020–21 | (Netherlands) Erik ten Hag | Ajax | |
| 2021–22 | (Netherlands) Arne Slot | Feyenoord | |
| 2022–23 | (Netherlands) Arne Slot | Feyenoord | |
| 2023–24 | (Netherlands) Peter Bosz | PSV | |
| 2024–25 | (Netherlands) Peter Bosz | PSV | |
| 2025–26 | (Netherlands) Dick Schreuder | NEC | |

== Winners Manager of the Month Eredivisie ==
- Robin van Persie (August, 2025)

== Winners Manager of the Year Eerste Divisie ==
| Season | Best Coach | Club | Sources |
|---|---|---|---|
| 2016-17 | (Netherlands) Maurice Steijn | VVV-Venlo | |
| 2017-18 | (Netherlands) Michael Reiziger | Jong Ajax | |
| 2018-19 | (Bosnia and Herzegovina) Marino Pušić | FC Twente | |
| 2019-20 | not awarded as season was terminated early due to COVID-19 pandemic | | |
| 2020-21 | (Netherlands) Henk de Jong | SC Cambuur | |
| 2021-22 | (Netherlands) Dick Lukkien | FC Emmen | |
| 2022-23 | (Netherlands) Dick Schreuder | PEC Zwolle | |
| 2023-24 | (Netherlands) Dick Lukkien | FC Groningen | |
| 2024-25 | (Netherlands) Rick Kruys | FC Volendam | |
| 2025-26 | (Netherlands) Robin Peter | ADO Den Haag | |

== Winners Manager of the Year Vrouwen Eredivisie ==
| Season | Best Coach | Club | Sources |
|---|---|---|---|
| 2023-24 | (Netherlands) Suzanne Bakker | Ajax | |
| 2024-25 | (Netherlands) Joran Pot | FC Twente | |
| 2025-26 | (Netherlands) Roeland ter Berge | PSV | |

== Winners Manager of the Year in Amateur Football ==
| Season | Best Coach | Club | Sources |
|---|---|---|---|
| 2003–04 | (Netherlands) Gert Aandewiel | Quick Boys | |
| 2004–05 | (Netherlands) Jan Zoutman | SV Argon | |
| 2005–06 | (Netherlands) Jack van den Berg | ASWH | |
| 2006–07 | (Netherlands) Michel Jansen | HHC Hardenberg | |
| 2007–08 | (Netherlands) Hans van Arum | Sparta Nijkerk | |
| 2008–09 | (Netherlands) Henk de Jong | Harkemase Boys | |
| 2009–10 | (Netherlands) Dennis Demmers | Excelsior '31, Colmschate '33 | |
| 2010–11 | (Netherlands) Peter Wesselink | SVZW | |
| 2011–12 | (Netherlands) Eric Meijers | Achilles '29 | |
| 2012–13 | (Netherlands) Marcel Groninger | Be Quick 1887 | |
| 2013–14 | (Netherlands) Simon Ouaali | Sparta Nijkerk | |
| 2014–15 | (Netherlands) Adrie Poldervaart | VV Zwaluwen | |
| 2015–16 | (Netherlands) Wilfred van Leeuwen | VVSB | |
| 2016–17 | (Netherlands) Jan van Raalte | SC Genemuiden | |
| 2017–18 | (Netherlands) Paul van der Zwaan | Quick Den Haag | |
| 2018–19 | (Netherlands) Laurens Knippenborg | RKZVC | |

== Lifetime Achievement Award winners ==
The following managers have been awarded the Rinus Michels Lifetime Achievement Award (or Rinus Michels Oeuvreprijs in Dutch) for their contributions to Dutch and international football, spanning their entire career:

| Year | Recipient | Sources |
|---|---|---|
| 2004 | (Netherlands) Kees Rijvers | |
| 2005 | (Netherlands) Piet de Visser | |
| 2008 | (Netherlands) Wiel Coerver | |
| 2009 | (Netherlands) Foppe de Haan | |
| 2010 | (Netherlands) Leo Beenhakker | |
| 2013 | (Netherlands) Louis van Gaal | |
| 2015 | (Netherlands) Guus Hiddink | |
| 2016 | (Netherlands) Johan Cruyff | |
| 2017 | (Netherlands) Co Adriaanse | |
| 2021 | (Netherlands) Dick Advocaat | |
| 2022 | (Netherlands) Bert van Marwijk | |
| 2024 | (Netherlands) Vera Pauw | |
