= Piet de Visser (football manager) =

Dutch football manager and scout (born 1934)

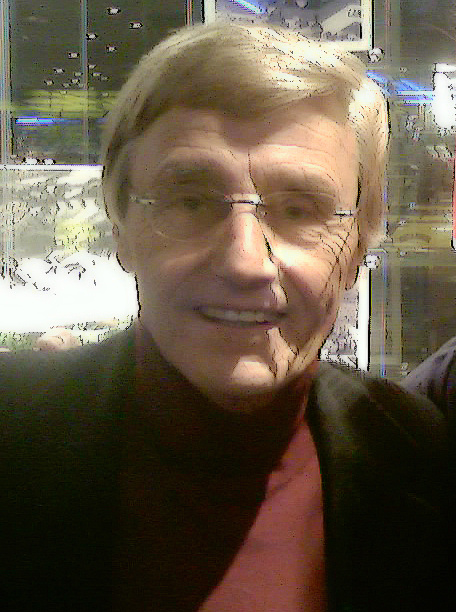
- de Visser pictured in 2006

Personal information
- Date of birth: 23 September 1934 (age 92)
- Place of birth: Oost-Souburg, Netherlands

Managerial career
- Years: Team
- 1957–1963: Sparta (assistant)
- 1964–1966: DFC
- 1966–1969: Telstar
- 1969–1971: DFC
- 1971–1974: De Graafschap
- 1974–1976: NEC
- 1976–1977: R.W.D. Molenbeek
- 1978–1980: Den Haag
- 1980–1983: Roda JC
- 1983–1985: AZ
- 1985–1990: Willem II
- 1991: Willem II
- 1992–1993: NAC Breda
- 1994: Guinea

Piet de Visser (born 23 September 1934) is a Dutch football manager and scout. He is best known for scouting players such as Romário, Ronaldo and Ruud van Nistelrooij for PSV and bringing them to European football. He later worked as a scout and personal adviser to Roman Abramovich, the former owner of English Premier League club Chelsea. De Visser also runs a youth football academy in Accra, Ghana.

== Career ==
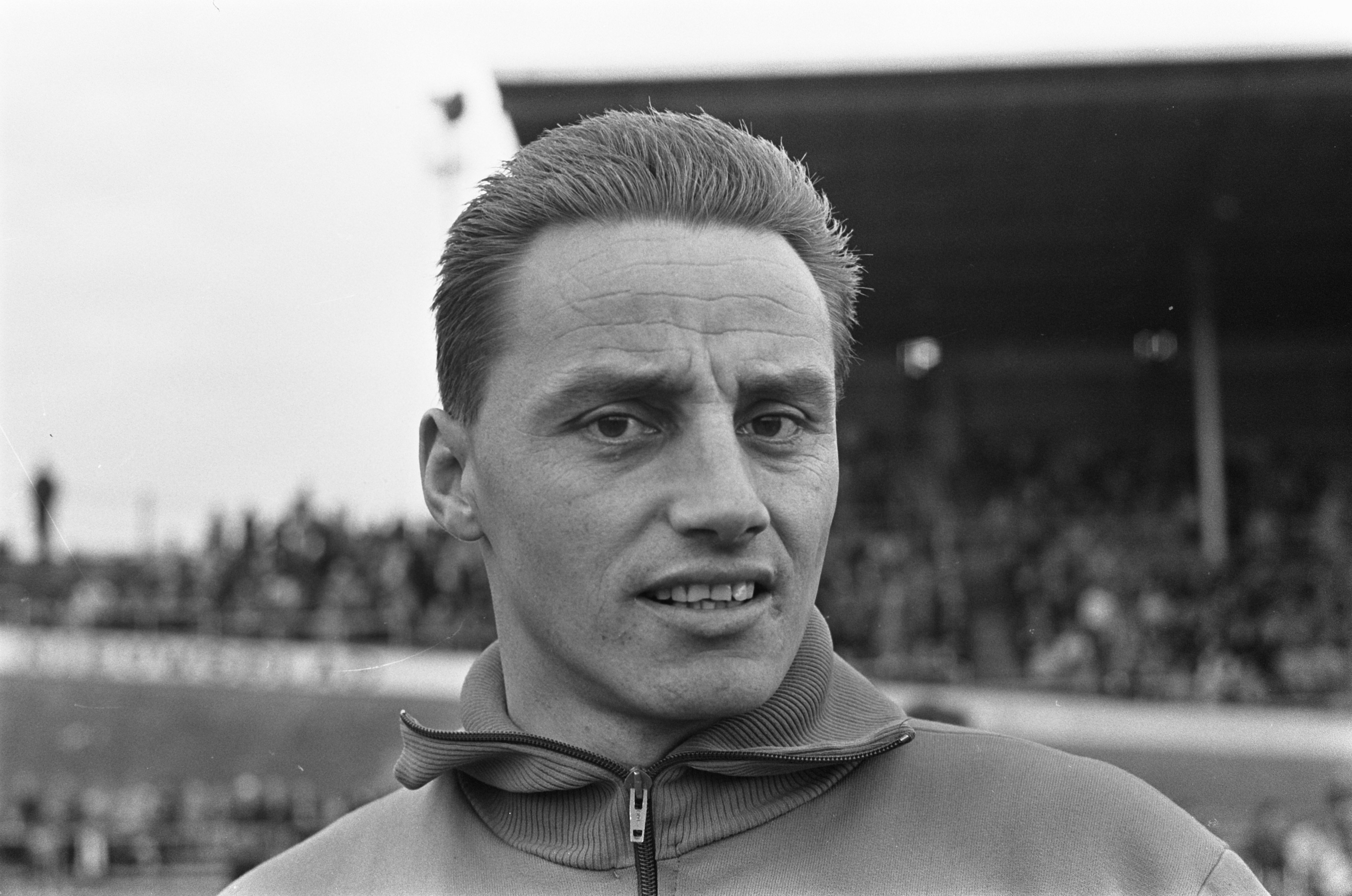
De Visser in 1966

=== Manager ===
After a career as a player for De Zeeuwen, RCH and Zeeland Sport, De Visser moved into management. In 1957, he started as a youth and assistant manager at Sparta Rotterdam.

In 1964, he took his first job as a head manager at DFC and became champion of the second division in his first year. In 1973, while manager of De Graafschap, he and his club, which included defender Guus Hiddink, were promoted to the Eredivisie. He then became champion of the Eerste Divisie with NEC in 1975, and moved to Molenbeek, which had won the Belgian League the preceding season.

While managing Willem II, De Visser signed the Guinean midfielder Mohammed Sylla. The connection with the country led to an advisory role with the Guinean football association, and in 1994 he briefly coached the national team at the Africa Cup of Nations.

He ended his management career in 1993, while at NAC Breda, due to heart problems. He has since had serious health problems, beating cancer and undergoing five bypass operations. During his career, De Visser managed Sparta, DFC, Telstar, De Graafschap, NEC, R.W.D. Molenbeek, FC Den Haag, Roda JC, AZ, Willem II and NAC Breda.

=== PSV ===
After his management career, De Visser worked as a scout for PSV for some fifteen years. Players he recommended to the club include Ronaldo, Ruud van Nistelrooij, Alex, Heurelho Gomes and Balázs Dzsudzsák. He also scouted Adriano, but PSV coach Erik Gerets was not interested in signing him.

=== Chelsea and Roman Abramovich ===
Since 2005, De Visser also scouted for Chelsea and was a close personal adviser on transfers to club owner Roman Abramovich. In one of his first assignments for Chelsea, De Visser was responsible for the transfer of Arjen Robben from PSV to Chelsea. Guus Hiddink, who played under De Visser at De Graafschap and worked with him at PSV, was recommended to Abramovich for the position of manager of the Russia national team. De Visser also recommended the hiring of Frank Arnesen to Abramovich, a move opposed by then Chelsea manager José Mourinho. It was also De Visser who first recommended the signings of Mikel John Obi and Salomon Kalou to Frank Arnesen for Chelsea. De Visser and Arnesen later clashed with Mourinho over transfer policy, reportedly recommending Alex be brought over from PSV to address the club's defensive problems, while Mourinho preferred Khalid Boulahrouz.

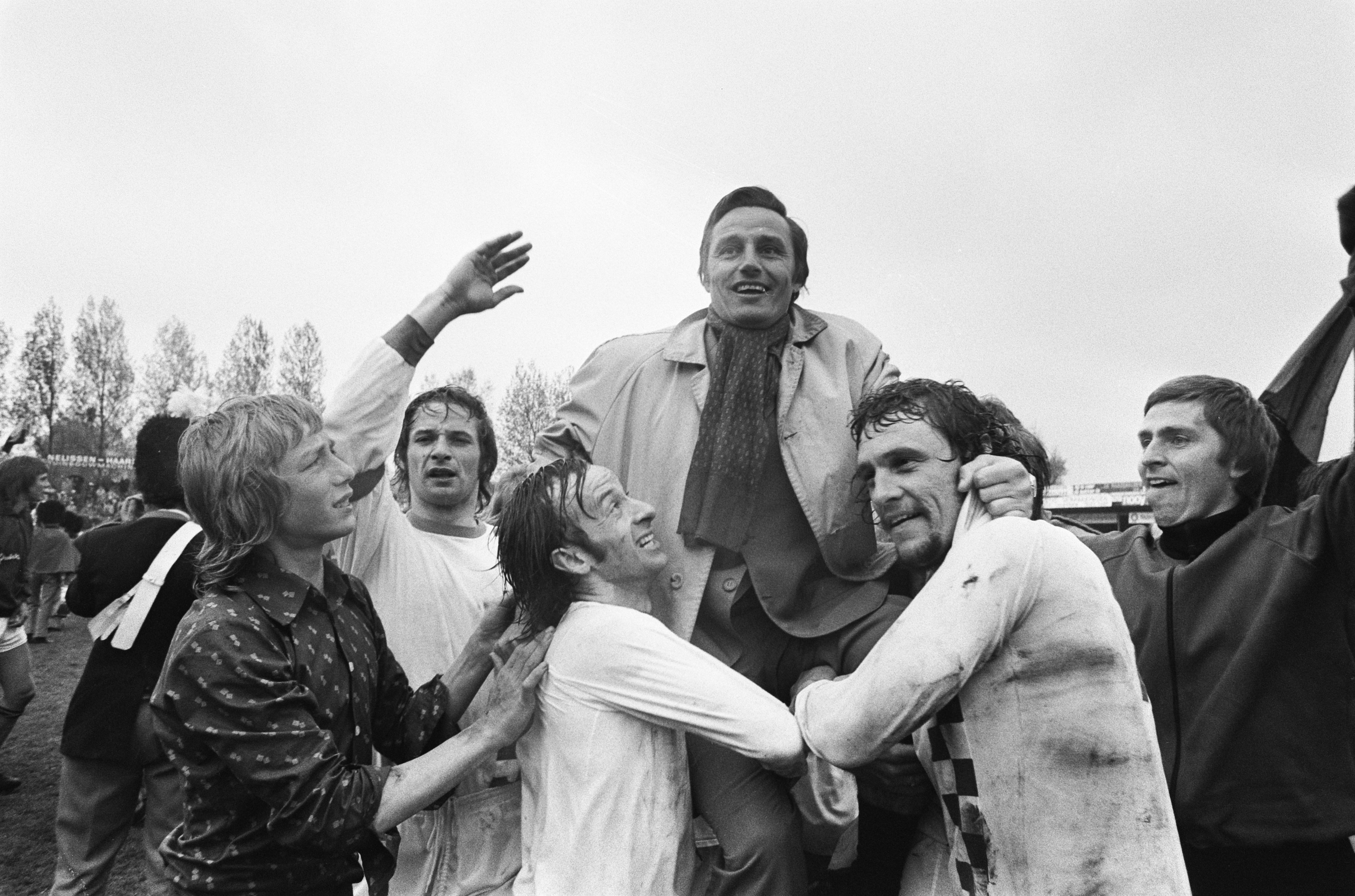
De Visser being carried by N.E.C. players in 1975

De Visser also helped Abramovich set up a youth academy at Chelsea, modelled on the academy at PSV. According to De Visser, "Mr Abramovich is fed up that he has to keep paying millions and millions for big star players. He had to pay an absolute fortune to get players like Didier Drogba and Michael Essien. This is why he has asked me as a private scout to look out for top class young players who will be the Chelsea stars in three years time."

De Visser was also involved in the February 2009 dismissal of Chelsea manager Luiz Felipe Scolari and the subsequent appointment of Guus Hiddink. According to De Visser, he warned Abramovich about Scolari's training methods: "I had to watch training sessions he was giving to the squad. I died of shock. It was so weak, his training sessions lacked every kind of sharpness. It made the entire squad lack sharpness in matches. I did not need a lot of time to conclude things were really bad with Chelsea."

=== Football academy in Ghana ===
De Visser runs the Attram De Visser Soccer Academy in Accra, Ghana, together with the former Ghana international Godwin Attram. Before the COVID-19 pandemic he travelled to Accra every few months to work with the players. Kwadwo "Mahala" Opoku was the first player from the academy to establish himself at a club abroad.

De Visser continued to follow football into his nineties. In 2026, aged 91, he told the regional newspaper Brabants Dagblad that he still watched matches and kept scouting notes at his home in Oisterwijk.

== Honours ==
De Visser won the Dutch Second Division in his time as a manager. In 2005, he received the Rinus Michels Lifetime Achievement Award (Rinus Michels Oeuvreprijs) for his career as a whole. The award is named after Rinus Michels, who was named coach of the century by FIFA in 1999.

== Criticism of player agents ==
De Visser has openly criticised what he sees as the manipulation of young players by player agents. He has said, "I want the player to get a good contract, and also that the football association and the club where the boy comes from gets a decent compensation. I would like to climb to the top of Mount Kilimanjaro and shout across the continent, Boys watch out for shady agents!"

Awards
Preceded by Kees Rijvers	Rinus Michels oeuvre award 2005	Succeeded by Wiel Coerver
