= Wiel Coerver =

Dutch football manager (1924–2011)

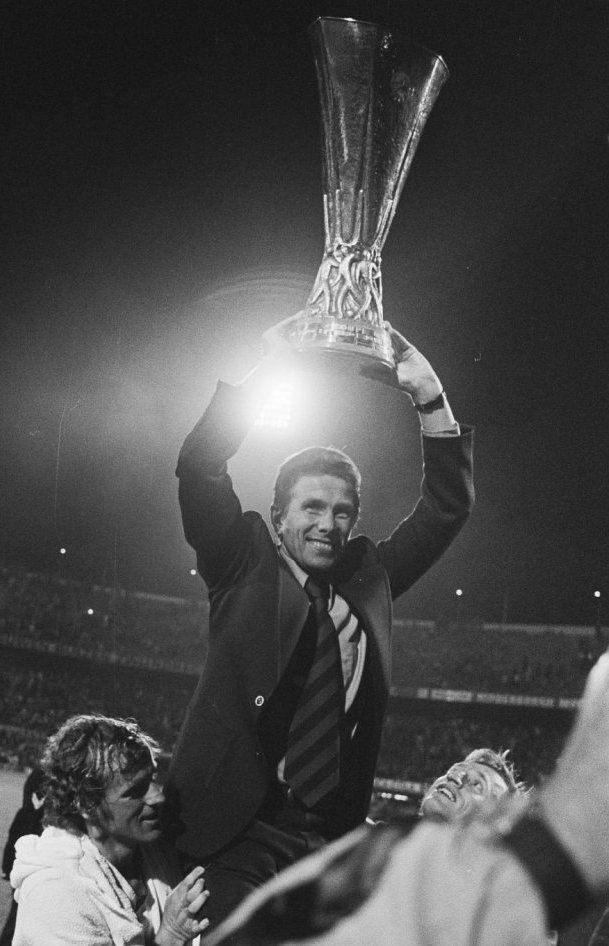
- Coerver lifting the UEFA Cup in 1974

Personal information
- Date of birth: 3 December 1924
- Place of birth: Kerkrade, Netherlands
- Date of death: 22 April 2011 (aged 86)
- Place of death: Kerkrade, Netherlands

Senior career*
Years	Team	Apps	(Gls)
1954–1959	Rapid JC		

Managerial career
- 1959–1965: S.V.N.
- 1965–1966: Roda JC
- 1966–1969: Sparta
- 1970–1973: N.E.C.
- 1973–1975: Feyenoord
- 1975–1976: Indonesia
- 1976–1977: Go Ahead Eagles
- * Club domestic league appearances and goals

Wiel Coerver (Dutch pronunciation: [ʋil ˈkuːrvər]; 3 December 1924 – 22 April 2011) was a Dutch football manager and the developer of the "Coerver Method", a football coaching technique.

== Playing career ==
Coerver played five years for local side Rapid JC, with whom he won the Dutch league title in 1956.

== Managerial career ==
After retiring as a player, he managed Dutch clubs S.V.N., Rapid JC, Sparta, N.E.C., Feyenoord and Go Ahead Eagles as well as Indonesia. He won the UEFA Cup with Feyenoord Rotterdam in the 1973–1974 season as well as the Eredivisie title.

=== Coerver Method ===
The Coerver Method is a football coaching technique which Coerver created. By analysing videotapes of various great players including Pelé, he devised his concept which advocates that skill could not only be inherent with the young players but could also be passed on in a comprehensive academic manner. Under this technique, players progress in a structured manner, pyramidal, from basics of ball mastery to a tactically driven group attack. They would be exposed to the other essentials like Receiving and Passing, Moves (1v1), Speed and Lethal Finishing.

The 1998 FIFA World Cup in France saw the first Coerver student, Boudewijn Zenden who played for the Dutch national team, make it to the FIFA World Cup.

== Personal life ==
Coerver, who was born in Kerkrade, was nicknamed the "Albert Einstein of Football". He died of pneumonia in April 2011 in Kerkrade.

== Honours ==
Feyenoord

- Eredivisie: 1973–74
- UEFA Cup: 1973–74

Individual

- Rinus Michels Lifetime Achievement Award (Rinus Michels Oeuvreprijs): 2008

== See also ==
- List of UEFA Cup winning managers

Awards
Preceded by Piet de Visser	Rinus Michels oeuvre award 2008	Succeeded by Foppe de Haan
