= Marcel Groninger =

Dutch football coach (born 1970)

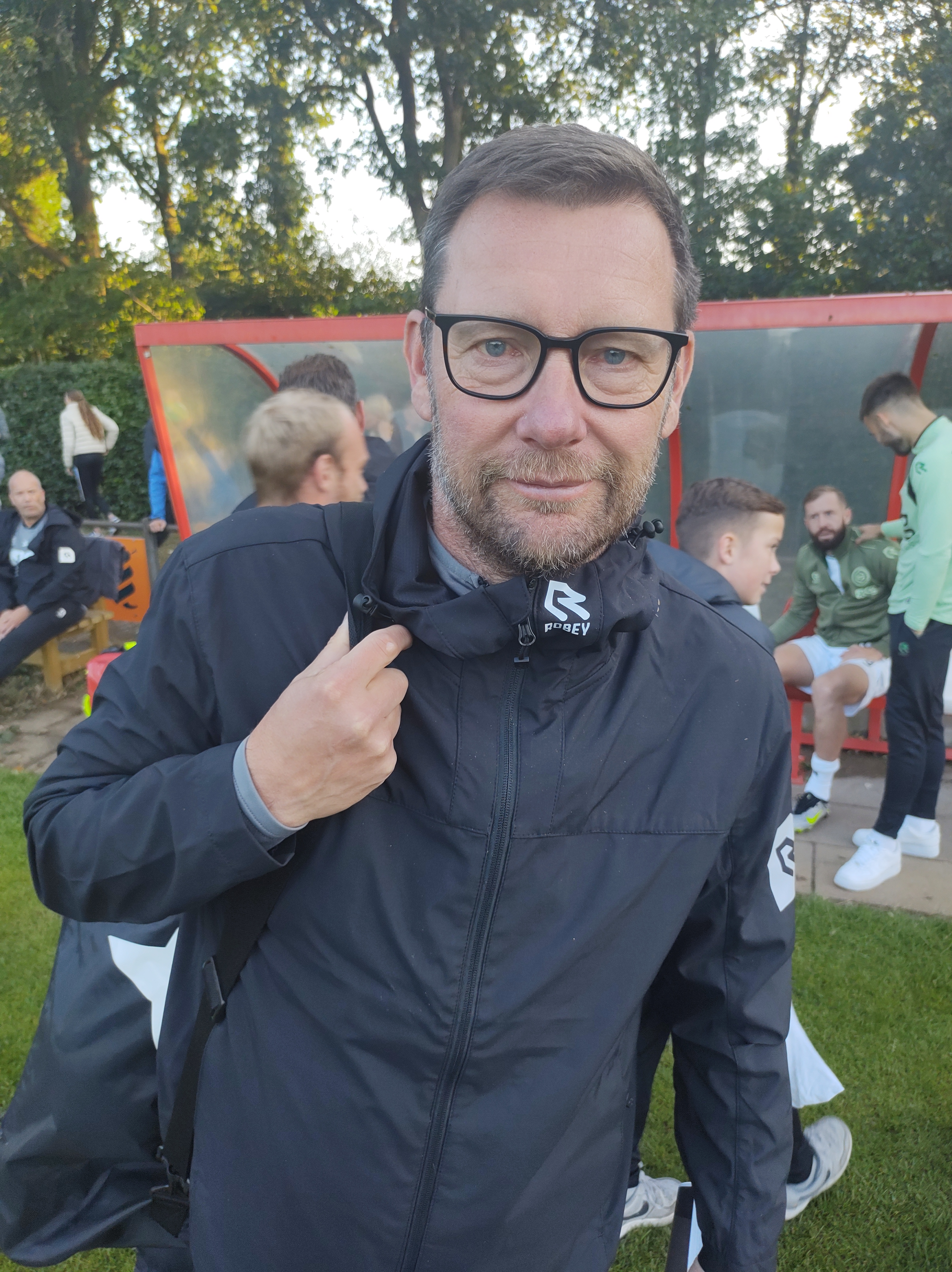

Personal information
- Date of birth: 19 August 1970 (age 56)
- Place of birth: Groningen, Netherlands
- Position: Defender

Team information
- Current team: Netherlands U21 (caretaker)

Senior career*
Years	Team	Apps	(Gls)
1990–1991	FC Groningen	0	(0)
1991–1997	Gronitas		
1997–1998	Appingedam		
2000–2002	Achilles 1894		
2002–2003	Be Quick 1887		

Managerial career
- –2007: VV Helpman
- 2008–2013: Be Quick 1887
- 2013–2016: HHC Hardenberg
- 2013–2018: FC Groningen (assistant)
- 2019–: Netherlands U21 (assistant)
- 2020: Netherlands U21 (caretaker)
- * Club domestic league appearances and goals

Marcel Groninger (born 19 August 1970) is a Dutch football coach and former player who is assistant coach of the Netherlands U21 national team. In 2013, Groninger won the national Rinus Michels Award for his coaching of Be Quick 1887.

== Playing career ==
Groninger was a youth player of GRC Groningen, where he was scouted by FC Groningen. He then played in FC Groningen youth. In the season of 1990-1991 he was a member of FC Groningen's first squad. He played mostly on the second team that won the championship of the Reserveklasse. Groninger then played for SC Gronitas, VV Appingedam and Achilles 1894.

== Managerial career ==
=== Clubs ===
Groninger started his coaching career at VV Helpman and in 2008 continued to Be Quick 1887. In his 6th season, Groninger and his team took a Hoofdklasse C championship. Following his achievements that season, on 10 May 2013 Groninger received the Rinus Michels Award as best coach in Dutch amateur soccer.

In July 2013, Groninger became the chief coach of then Topklasse side HHC Hardenberg and an assistant coach of FC Groningen in the Eredivisie. With FC Groningen, Marcel Groninger won the 2014–15 KNVB Cup. With HHC Hardenberg, Groninger caused havoc when his team beat NEC Nijmegen from the Eredivisie in eight finals of the 2015–16 KNVB Cup. Subsequently, in its first KNVB Cup quarter finals ever, HHC Hardenberg lost 1–0 to AZ Alkmaar. At the conclusion of the 2015–16 season, Groninger left HHC to become the first assistant coach of the new chief coach Ernest Faber. At the end of 2017–18 Groninger left FC Groningen.

=== Netherlands U21 ===
In 2019 Groninger became assistant coach of the Netherlands U21 national team, again under Ernest Faber. In August 2020, he served as caretaker coach after Erwin van de Looi was promoted to the staff of the senior team.
