= Louis van Gaal =

Dutch football player and manager (born 1951)

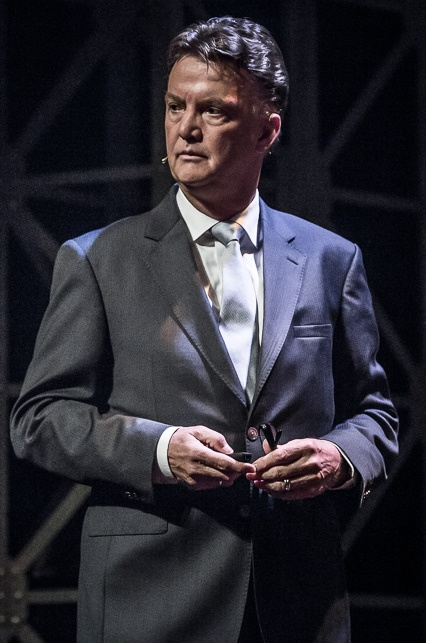
- Van Gaal in 2014

Personal information
- Full name: Aloysius Paulus Maria van Gaal
- Date of birth: 8 August 1951 (age 75)
- Place of birth: Amsterdam, Netherlands
- Height: 1.85 m (6 ft 1 in)
- Position: Midfielder

Youth career
- RKSV de Meer

Senior career*
Years	Team	Apps	(Gls)
- RKSV de Meer
1972–1973	Ajax	0	(0)
1973–1977	Antwerp	41	(7)
1977–1978	Telstar	25	(1)
1978–1986	Sparta	249	(26)
1986–1987	AZ	17	(0)
Total		332	(34)

Managerial career
- 1991–1997: Ajax
- 1997–2000: Barcelona
- 2000–2001: Netherlands
- 2001: Netherlands U20
- 2002–2003: Barcelona
- 2005–2009: AZ
- 2009–2011: Bayern Munich
- 2012–2014: Netherlands
- 2014–2016: Manchester United
- 2021–2022: Netherlands
Medal record
Men's football
Representing Netherlands (as manager)
FIFA World Cup
Third place	2014 Brazil	Team
- * Club domestic league appearances and goals

Aloysius Paulus Maria "Louis" van Gaal (Dutch pronunciation: [luˈʋi vɑŋ ˈɣaːl]; (Note: Van in isolation is pronounced [vɑn].) born 8 August 1951) is a Dutch former football player and manager. At club level, he served as manager of Ajax, Barcelona, AZ, Bayern Munich and Manchester United, as well as having three spells in charge of the Netherlands national team. Nicknamed the "Iron Tulip", Van Gaal has won 20 major honours in his managerial career at club level.

Before his career as a coach, Van Gaal played as a midfielder for Royal Antwerp, Telstar, Sparta Rotterdam, Ajax and AZ. He is also a qualified physical education teacher, and worked at high schools during his career as a semi-professional footballer. After a brief spell as an assistant coach at AZ, Van Gaal served as an assistant under Leo Beenhakker at Ajax, and eventually took over as head coach in 1991. Under his lead, the club won three Eredivisie titles, the UEFA Cup and the UEFA Champions League. He moved to Barcelona in 1997 and won two league titles and one Copa del Rey, but left after disagreements with the club's hierarchy.

Van Gaal was then appointed at the Netherlands, but failed to qualify for the 2002 FIFA World Cup. This preceded another brief spell at Barcelona, before he returned to AZ, where he won an Eredivisie title, the club's second ever in its history. He moved to Bayern Munich in 2009, and in Germany won the Bundesliga, the DFB-Pokal and reached the final of the UEFA Champions League. He returned to manage the Netherlands for a second time, where he led the nation to a third-place finish at the 2014 FIFA World Cup. He was appointed manager of Manchester United later that summer, where he won the FA Cup before he was dismissed only days later. Despite announcing his retirement in 2019, due to family reasons, Van Gaal returned to management in August 2021, when he was appointed as head coach of the Netherlands for a third time. He retired from management after the 2022 FIFA World Cup. He later served as adviser to the Supervisory Board of Ajax from October 2023 until July 2026.

== Playing and early coaching career ==
Van Gaal was born in Amsterdam. As a youngster, he started playing for the Amsterdam amateur side RKSV de Meer. At the age of 20, he joined the second team of Ajax, but was never chosen to play in the first team, which at the time boasted players such as Johan Cruyff and Johan Neeskens in the midfield positions. He was loaned to Belgian First Division side Royal Antwerp playing under Guy Thys with whom he was runner-up in the Belgian top division in 1974 and 1975. During his time with Antwerp, Van Gaal suffered a broken nose in a friendly against Kortrijk. After four years spent in Belgium, he returned to his homeland and made his Eredivisie debut for Telstar under the guidance of manager, Mircea Petescu, whom he followed to Sparta. He spent the most of his playing days at the Rotterdam West club and missed a penalty for them in the 1983–84 UEFA Cup against Spartak Moscow, but scored one in the same competition a year later against Hamburger SV.

He later joined AZ, where he also became assistant coach in 1986. After a short career at AZ, he returned to Ajax to become Leo Beenhakker's assistant. When Beenhakker left in 1991, Van Gaal took over as manager.

== Management career ==
=== Ajax (1991–1997) ===
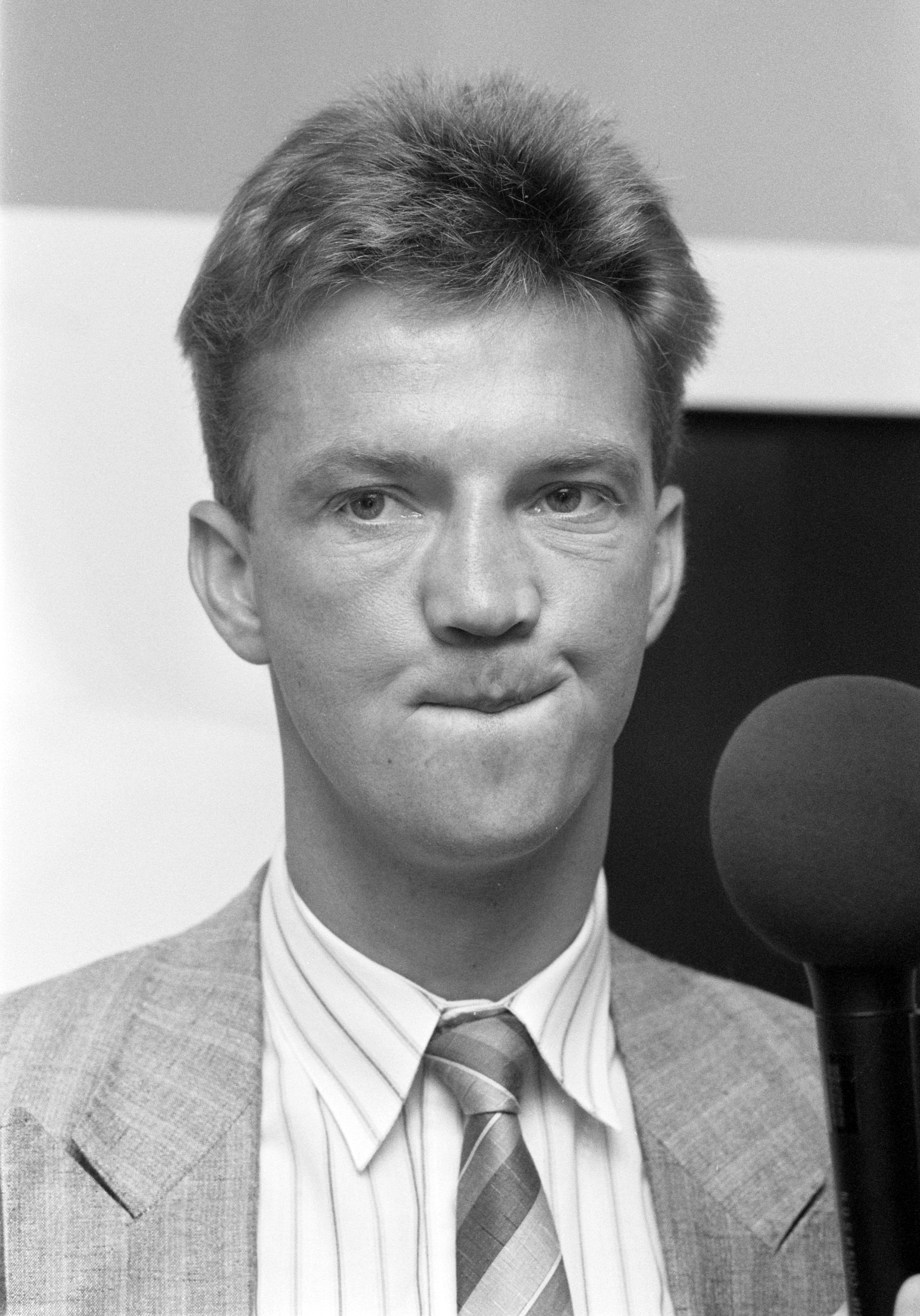
Van Gaal in 1988 as assistant manager with Ajax

Van Gaal was Ajax manager from 1991 until 1997 and had a very successful tenure. Under Van Gaal, Ajax became the Eredivisie champions three times, in 1994, 1995 (notably going the entire 1994–95 season unbeaten in both the league and the Champions League) and 1996. He also led Ajax to the KNVB Cup in 1993 and the Johan Cruyff Shield in 1993, 1994, and 1995. On the European scene, Ajax captured the UEFA Cup in 1992 and the UEFA Champions League in 1995 after beating Milan in the final. The latter win was followed by a 5–1 aggregate win over Real Zaragoza in the 1995 UEFA Super Cup. Late in 1995, Ajax beat Brazilian side Grêmio on penalties to win the Intercontinental Cup. Ajax were also Champions League runners-up in 1996 after losing to Juventus on penalties.

Ajax was so successful under Van Gaal's leadership that during the 1990s, the Netherlands national team was dominated by Ajax players such as Patrick Kluivert, Marc Overmars, Dennis Bergkamp, Frank and Ronald de Boer, Edgar Davids, Clarence Seedorf, Winston Bogarde, Michael Reiziger and Edwin van der Sar.

After serving out his contract at Ajax in 1997, Van Gaal received his knighthood in the Order of Orange-Nassau.

=== Barcelona (1997–2000) ===
Van Gaal moved to Barcelona in 1997, taking over from Bobby Robson, and helped the team win two La Liga titles (1997–98, 1998–99) and the Copa del Rey once. Despite this success, he clashed with the media and came under criticism. He expressed that it was difficult to implement his football philosophy at Barcelona due to cultural differences, and that he struggled hard as some players were unwilling to follow his lead. His rows with Rivaldo are an example of this: Van Gaal insisted Rivaldo play as a left winger, whereas Rivaldo argued that he wanted to play in the centre, in effect undermining Van Gaal.

Van Gaal eventually left the Catalan side on 20 May 2000, days after losing the league title to Deportivo La Coruña, uttering the immortal line: "Amigos de la prensa. Yo me voy. Felicidades." ("Friends of the press. I am leaving. Congratulations.") He returned to the Netherlands to manage the Netherlands national team in preparation for the 2002 FIFA World Cup.

=== Netherlands national team (2000–2002) ===
Under Van Gaal, the Netherlands started their campaign to qualify for the 2002 World Cup poorly. Placed in Group 2, an injury-hit side could only manage to secure a late 2–2 draw at home to the Republic of Ireland, having been 2–0 down with 20 minutes to go. A 4–0 win over Cyprus was followed by a 2–0 defeat to Portugal.

In 2001, the Netherlands beat Andorra, Cyprus and Estonia, but despite leading group leaders Portugal 2–0 with seven minutes left, drew 2–2 and fell three points behind second-place Republic of Ireland, who were unbeaten. When the sides met in Dublin, Van Gaal boasted before the match that his squad was so much more talented, even the Irish fans would want them to qualify. Ireland went down to ten men after 58 minutes but scored nine minutes later and won 1–0. The Netherlands fell seven points behind them with two games left to play, meaning that they failed to qualify for the World Cup for the first time since 1986. Van Gaal stepped down as manager on 31 January 2002 to be replaced by Dick Advocaat. After this, speculation began that Van Gaal would succeed Sir Alex Ferguson at Manchester United once Ferguson claimed he would retire that year. According to Van Gaal, Ferguson decided against retiring and the deal fell through.

=== Return to Barcelona (2002–2003) ===
Van Gaal returned to Barcelona for the start of the 2002–03 season on a contract until June 2005, but results were inconsistent. The club won a record-equalling ten successive matches in the Champions League but struggled in La Liga. After four wins, four draws and three defeats from their opening 11 league matches, Barcelona lost three matches in a row, to Real Sociedad, relegation-threatened Rayo Vallecano and Sevilla. Two wins and a draw improved things but after successive defeats to Valencia and Celta Vigo, he left by mutual consent on 28 January 2003 with the club in 12th place, just three points above the relegation zone and 20 points behind leaders Real Sociedad.

His transfers, particularly the signings of goalkeeper Robert Enke, midfielder Gaizka Mendieta and playmaker Juan Román Riquelme, all disappointed. Riquelme had been bought to replace Rivaldo, whom Van Gaal had released on a free transfer, despite having a year left on his contract. The two had fallen out during Van Gaal's previous tenure and after Van Gaal returned, Rivaldo said: "Van Gaal is the main cause of my departure. I don't like Van Gaal, and I am sure that he doesn't like me, either." Van Gaal replied that Rivaldo's lack of commitment was the reason he was released, saying that he "was only interested in making more money and playing less. He was chosen as the best player in 1999, but he has not handled himself well since then and has not behaved like a footballer should. He had illusions about Barca and was requesting to take holidays when important Champions League games were approaching. He then hides back home in Brazil. He plays for Brazil like we needed him to at Barcelona, and he has proved this in the World Cup finals, showing he reserved himself for Japan." Rivaldo joined AC Milan and won that season's Champions League. However, due to his poor performances throughout the season, he won the Bidone d'Oro Award in 2003, which is given to the worst Serie A player during a particular season.

=== Return to Ajax (2004) ===
In 2004, Van Gaal returned to Ajax as a technical director, but resigned later that year due to an internal conflict with Ronald Koeman.

=== AZ (2005–2009) ===
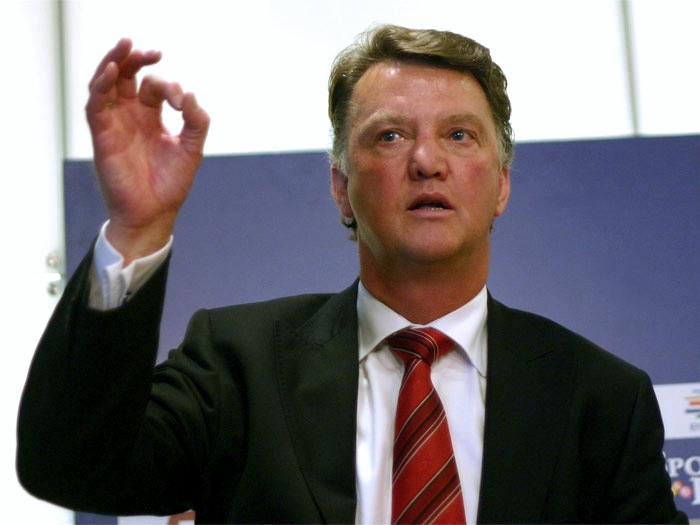
Van Gaal with AZ

In January 2005, it was announced that Van Gaal would replace Co Adriaanse as AZ manager on 1 July 2005. Under Van Gaal, AZ finished second in the Eredivisie in 2005–06 and third in 2006–07. Van Gaal also led AZ to a runners-up finish in the 2006–07 KNVB Cup and lost a 2007–08 Champions League qualification play-off to Ajax 4–2 on aggregate.

Van Gaal initially announced he would leave AZ at the end of the 2007–08 season due to disappointing results, with the club finishing 11th in the Eredivisie. When several players of the AZ squad said that they would like him to stay with AZ, however, Van Gaal said he would give the players a chance to prove themselves.

AZ started the 2008–09 season with two losses: 2–1 to NAC Breda and 0–3 to ADO Den Haag, but after that the Alkmaar-based club remained unbeaten until 18 April, topping the table ahead of Twente and Ajax for the entire season, despite being predicted to finish as low as 13th by pundits. AZ had the best defensive record in the Eredivisie and the second-best goalscoring record, behind Ajax, thanks to its offensive duo of league topscorer Mounir El Hamdaoui and Brazilian Ari. They were crowned league champions on 19 April, one day after AZ suffered an unexpected loss at home to Vitesse, which ended a string of 28 unbeaten games (surpassing the team's 1980–81 record of 25 unbeaten games). That same day Ajax, which was the only opponent that would have been able to surpass AZ given a win, lost 6–2 to PSV.

=== Bayern Munich (2009–2011) ===
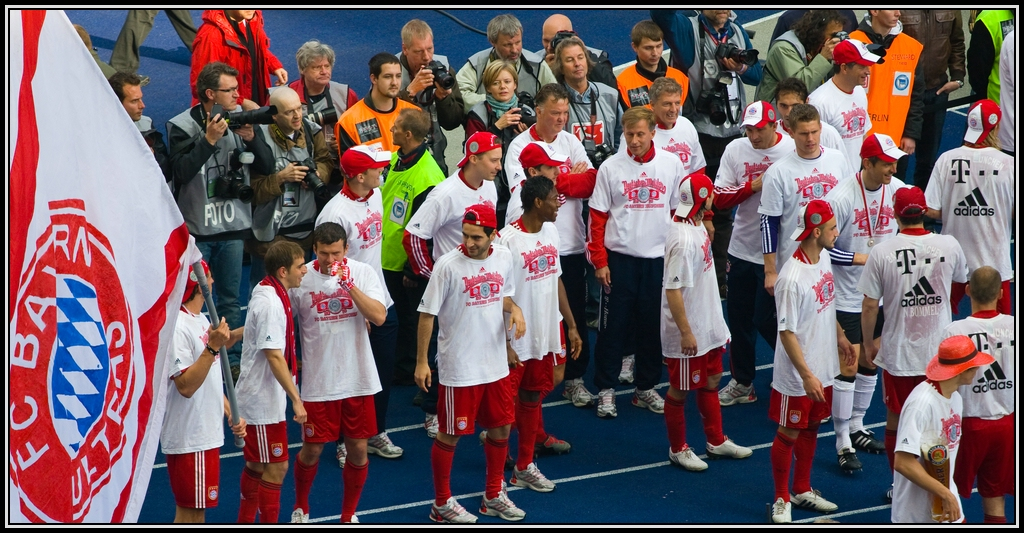
Van Gaal and Bayern Munich players celebrating their Bundesliga victory in 2010

On 1 July 2009, Van Gaal took over as coach of Bayern Munich. He referred to his new employer as a "dream club". On 28 August 2009, he strengthened his team by signing compatriot Arjen Robben from Real Madrid; this reunited the two, with Van Gaal selecting Robben for his debut in the Netherlands U20 team.

Van Gaal got off to a poor start as Bayern coach, winning only one of his first four matches in charge, and by November the club was on the brink of a Champions League group stage exit following two losses to Bordeaux. With Bayer Leverkusen at the top of the Bundesliga, speculation was rampant that he was on the brink of a departure from Bayern even earlier than his predecessor Jürgen Klinsmann. Van Gaal, however, kept insisting he is a "prozesstrainer", meaning that his team needs time to play the way he imagines.

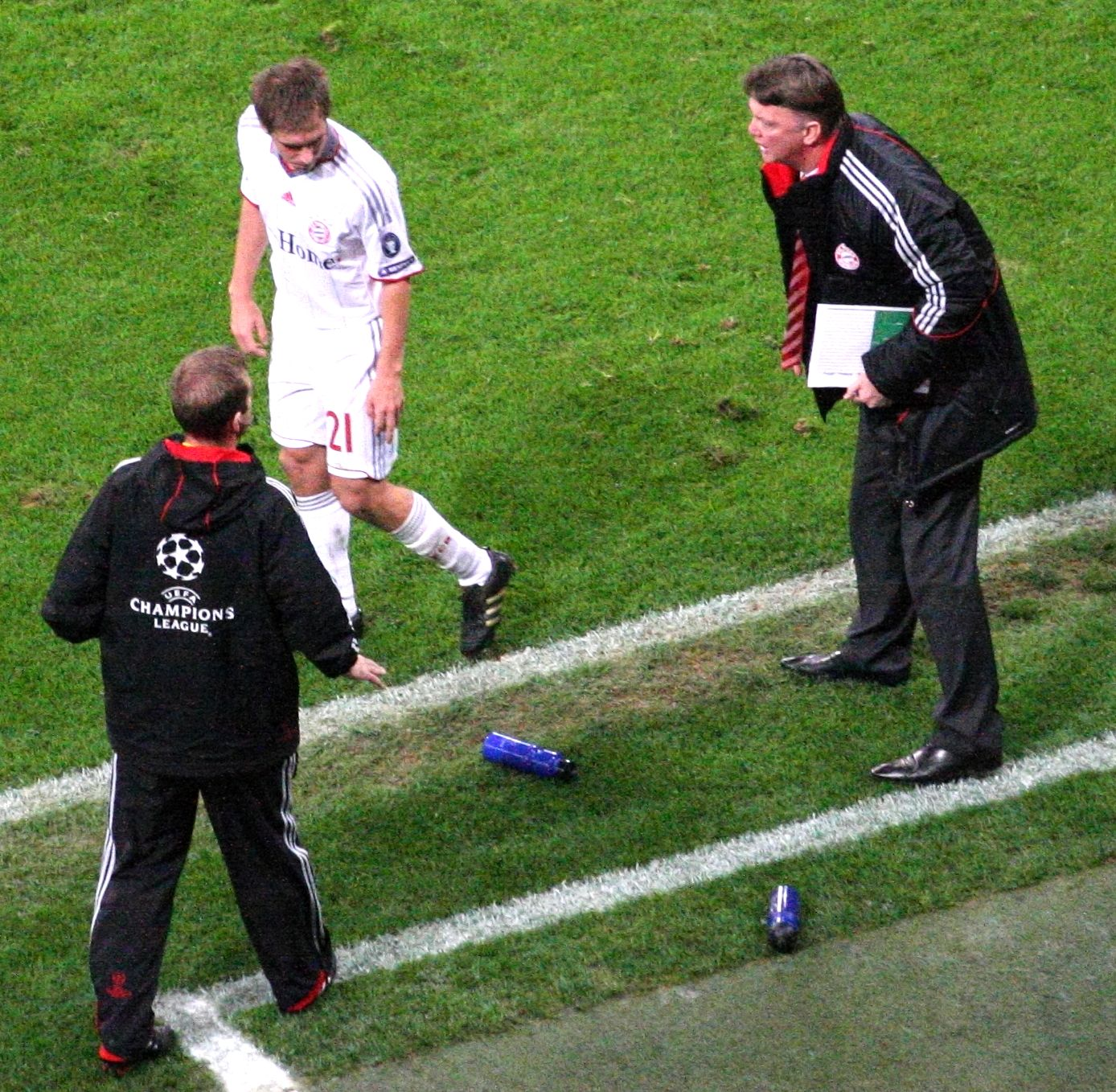
Van Gaal with Philipp Lahm in 2009

Van Gaal installed many youth players as fixtures in the starting 11, including Thomas Müller and Holger Badstuber, and also converted the winger Bastian Schweinsteiger into a defensive midfielder. A feud with Italian striker Luca Toni, who had played an important role in Bayern's 2007–08 league and cup double, led to Toni's move to Roma. Bayern Munich's form, however, improved with two Champions League victories including an impressive 4–1 victory over Juventus in Turin, which allowed them to progress from their group in second position behind Bordeaux. By March, Bayern had moved to the semi-finals of the DFB-Pokal and were top of the Bundesliga, ahead of Bayer Leverkusen.

On 8 May 2010, Bayern were crowned Bundesliga champions following a 3–1 win at Hertha Berlin, making Van Gaal the first ever Dutch coach to win the Bundesliga. On 15 May 2010, Bayern won the DFB-Pokal with a 4–0 victory over Werder Bremen, thus securing the domestic double.

In the Champions League, Bayern won 4–4 on the away goals rule in the quarter-final against Manchester United and 4–0 on aggregate against Lyon in the semi-final, securing them a spot in the final, where Van Gaal was to meet his former pupil and assistant at Barcelona, Internazionale coach José Mourinho. Bayern, however, lost the final 2–0, handing Inter a first Italian treble and thus failing to secure the treble themselves. On 25 May 2010, Karl-Heinz Rummenigge expressed his desire to extend Van Gaal's contract as the club was very happy with his performance, despite Van Gaal still having one year of his contract to fulfil. At the end of the season, Van Gaal was voted Manager of the Year in the yearly poll organized by VDV (professional players' union in Germany) and German magazine kicker.

Van Gaal's Bayern started the 2010–11 season by winning the DFL-Supercup, which had been officially reinstated after a 14-year absence.

On 7 March 2011, Bayern Munich declared that Van Gaal's contract was to be cancelled after the end of the 2010–11 season. However, he was instead sacked on 10 April 2011 after losing the third place in the Bundesliga.

=== Return to Netherlands national team (2012–2014) ===
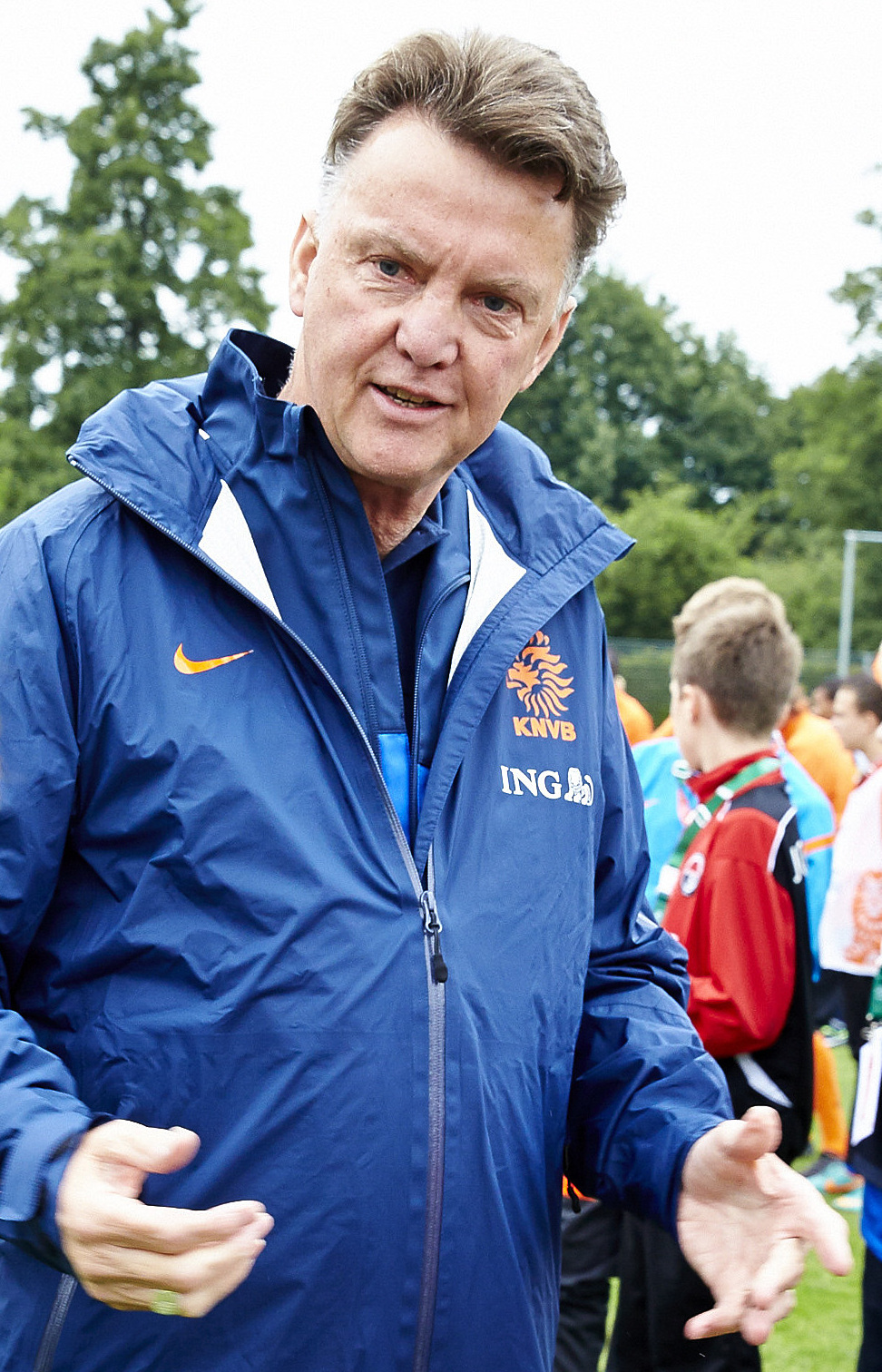
Van Gaal with the Dutch national team in 2013

On 6 July 2012, Van Gaal was presented as the new Netherlands coach. "I am happy that the KNVB approached me", said Van Gaal, who was assisted by former Dutch internationals Danny Blind and Patrick Kluivert, both part of his successful Ajax squad from 1995. "This is the challenge which I have been waiting for."

Van Gaal led the Netherlands through its 2014 World Cup qualification group as the team won nine and drew one of their ten matches with a goal difference of 34–5. Qualification was secured with two matches to spare, following a 2–0 away win against Andorra on 10 September 2013.

Despite their successful qualifying campaign, expectations surrounding the Netherlands national team were comparatively low due to mixed pre-tournament friendly performances and the failure of the Dutch squad in Euro 2012, where they suffered three defeats out of three in the group stages in that tournament. In their first group game at the World Cup, at the Estádio Fonte Nova in Salvador, however, Van Gaal's Dutch team came from behind to defeat reigning champions Spain 5–1. The Dutch victory over Spain was attributed in part to Van Gaal's use of counter-attacking tactics which disrupted the tiki-taka possession-based football of the Spanish team. His use of a 3–5–2 formation was notable, as opposed to the typical Dutch 4–3–3 and this helped the Netherlands to tactically take advantage of Spain's weaknesses. In their next match, the Dutch were trailing 2–1 to Australia in the second half of their second group game, before winning 2–3 with the winning goal from young substitute Memphis Depay.

Ahead of the last game in the group, Van Gaal accused FIFA of "playing tricks" in the scheduling of matches to advantage the home nation, as Brazil were to play their last group match four hours after the Dutch, who they could meet in the round of 16 depending on their result. Brazil manager Luiz Felipe Scolari reacted by saying: "It was FIFA who chose the kick-off time. Some people expressed a view that we were going to choose who we were going to play. Those sorts of comments are either stupid or ill-intentioned." Van Gaal also criticised the referees who had awarded penalties against the Dutch in both of their matches, calling the decisions "unjustified" and "incorrect".

The Dutch won their last group match against Chile 2–0 to advance through as group winners. They then defeated Mexico 2–1 in the round of 16, coming behind from a Giovani dos Santos goal in the 45th minute, with Wesley Sneijder and Klaas-Jan Huntelaar scoring in the 89th and 90+2 minutes respectively.

During their quarter-final match against Costa Rica in the World Cup, Van Gaal made the decision to substitute first-choice goalkeeper Jasper Cillessen for Tim Krul in the final minute of extra time; as Krul had not played at all in the Netherlands' four prior matches at the tournament, Van Gaal saved one of his three allowed substitutions to bring Krul on. This decision paid off, as Krul saved two of the Costa Rican penalties to send the Netherlands through to the semi-finals to face Argentina. The Dutch team lost to Argentina in another penalty shootout. Van Gaal ended his tenure as Netherlands manager on 12 July 2014 when the Dutch beat the hosts Brazil 3–0 in the third/fourth place play-off match with goals from Robin van Persie, Daley Blind and Georginio Wijnaldum.

=== Manchester United (2014–2016) ===
Van Gaal was confirmed to replace David Moyes as the new manager for Manchester United on 19 May 2014, becoming the club's first manager from outside the British Isles. He signed a three-year contract coming into effect after the 2014 World Cup. He named Ryan Giggs as his assistant manager, Marcel Bout as assistant coach, specialising in oppositional scouting and Frans Hoek as goalkeeping coach. Albert Stuivenberg was appointed as assistant coach. Van Gaal said he had inherited a "broken" United squad, and that he would give youth a chance. Ed Woodward said Van Gaal had "impressed everyone around the club" and that there was "a real positive energy and buzz around the place".

==== 2014–15 season ====
Van Gaal's first signings were midfielder Ander Herrera for £29 million, and defender Luke Shaw for £30 million. On 20 August, Argentine defender Marcos Rojo was bought for €20 million from Sporting CP and, on 26 August, United signed Argentine winger Ángel Di María from Real Madrid on a five-year contract. Di María's £59.7 million fee set a new record for a signing by an English club, and took the club's summer spending to a reported £130 million. On transfer deadline day, Van Gaal signed Daley Blind from Ajax for a fee of £14 million and was granted an extension to sign Radamel Falcao on loan from Monaco for a reported £6 million.

On 24 July, Van Gaal managed United for the first time as they beat the LA Galaxy 7–0 in a pre-season friendly, using a 3–5–2 formation. Manchester United won the 2014 International Champions Cup under Van Gaal, winning the final 3–1 against rivals Liverpool on 4 August.

Van Gaal lost his first competitive game in charge, a 2–1 home defeat to Swansea City in the opening match of the 2014–15 Premier League season. On 26 August, United lost 4–0 to League One side Milton Keynes Dons in the second round of the League Cup; it was United's earliest League Cup exit. He won his first competitive game in United's fourth match of the league season, a 4–0 home victory over Queens Park Rangers, with goals from Di María, Herrera, Wayne Rooney and Juan Mata.

After ten league matches, United were in ninth place with 13 points and three victories, their worst start to the season since 1986–87 under Ron Atkinson. Their poor run included a 5–3 defeat to newly promoted Leicester City. The squad was suffering from injuries, including to new signings Herrera, Rojo and Falcao. Van Gaal reacted to the poor form by saying that it would take three years to take his United team to their full potential.

On 4 February 2015, Van Gaal was charged by The Football Association over comments he made about the referee Chris Foy, saying: "Every aspect of a match is against us – the pitch, the referee" during United's goalless draw in an FA Cup fourth-round match against Cambridge United. After a requested hearing with the FA, Van Gaal was cleared of his charges, but was warned of future conduct. On 8 February, Van Gaal was criticised by West Ham United manager Sam Allardyce for his long ball tactics after the Hammers conceded a late equaliser to United. Van Gaal responded to the criticism with statistics which seemed to show that West Ham played more long balls than his side. His tactics were defended by fellow managers Arsène Wenger and Garry Monk.

United's form improved as the season progressed. A run of seven consecutive Premier League wins was part of a ten-match unbeaten run that started with a 1–0 home win over Crystal Palace on 8 November 2014 and was ended by Southampton, who won 1–0 at Old Trafford on 11 January 2015. United completed another sequence of seven league wins in a row between 28 February and 12 April, concluding with an impressive 4–2 defeat of champions and local rivals Manchester City. This was followed by three consecutive losses to Chelsea, Everton and West Bromwich Albion. United were also knocked out at the quarter-final stage of the 2014–15 FA Cup by holders and eventual winners Arsenal, who inflicted a 2–1 home defeat on Van Gaal's team on 9 March.

In his first season, Van Gaal led Manchester United to a fourth-place finish, three places and six points higher than the previous season.

==== 2015–16 season ====
During the summer transfer window, Van Gaal strengthened his squad by bringing in Memphis Depay from PSV, Matteo Darmian from Torino, Sergio Romero from Sampdoria, Morgan Schneiderlin from Southampton, Bastian Schweinsteiger from Bayern Munich and Anthony Martial from Monaco.

United comfortably defeated Club Brugge in the qualifying round of the 2015–16 Champions League to earn a place in the group stage. Domestically, United were solid in defence and went top of the Premier League at the end of September; however, mixed results followed, leaving them in fourth position going into November. They were eliminated from the League Cup by Championship club Middlesbrough and were eliminated from the Champions League at the group stage on 8 December after a 3–2 loss away to VfL Wolfsburg. They finished third in their group and subsequently dropped down to the UEFA Europa League. Fifteen days later, Van Gaal walked out of a press conference after being questioned about his future, amid speculations of dismissal following a six-game run without a win. He concluded: "I wish you a merry Christmas and maybe also a happy new year when I see you."

The new year began well for the Dutchman with wins against Swansea City, Sheffield United and Liverpool, and a draw against Newcastle United. Manchester United, however, lost to Southampton on 23 January, rekindling rumors about Van Gaal offering to resign, but having his resignation rejected by United executive Ed Woodward.

After a 3–0 defeat away to Tottenham Hotspur on 10 April, several United players reportedly turned on Van Gaal in the dressing room, calling him "clueless" and questioning his tactics after he openly criticized young striker Marcus Rashford and several other players and made several questionable decisions during the match, a result which left United four points off fourth-placed Manchester City.

On 21 May 2016, Van Gaal won his only trophy with Manchester United, the FA Cup, when his side defeated Crystal Palace 2–1 after extra time; Jesse Lingard's winning goal made United match Arsenal's then-record of 12 FA Cups. Two days later, Van Gaal and the Dutch members of his staff were sacked by the club.

=== Hiatus from managing (2016–2021) ===
On 17 January 2017, it was announced that Van Gaal had retired "for family reasons". He later said that it was only a sabbatical. He announced his official retirement from football on 12 March 2019. Telstar announced that during the 2021–22 Eerste Divisie, Van Gaal would be managing the Telstar squad for one single match as a charity event.

=== Third stint at the Netherlands national team (2021−2022) ===
On 4 August 2021, Van Gaal came out of retirement to take charge of the Netherlands national team for a third time. He replaced Frank de Boer, who left the position in June following the team's disappointing Euro 2020 campaign.

Van Gaal's first match in his third stint at the Netherlands national team was a 1–1 draw against Norway on 1 September 2021.

In the 2022 FIFA World Cup, the Netherlands finished top of Group A, then they defeated the United States 3–1 in the round of 16. On 9 December, Van Gaal and his Netherlands side lost again to Argentina on penalties, this time in the quarter-finals. Following their exit from the World Cup, Van Gaal resigned as head coach of the Netherlands national team, after 20 matches without defeat in his third stint.

== Style of management ==
Van Gaal is considered to be one of the greatest and most successful managers of all time. He served as an inspiration for several other coaches due to his teams' style of play and his use of a back–three defensive line, including Gian Piero Gasperini and Alberto Malesani, as well as influencing his former assistant José Mourinho, and his former players Pep Guardiola and Luis Enrique. Due to his rigorous, stern, authoritative style, and strong personality he was occasionally nicknamed the "Iron Tulip" throughout his career, a nickname which Van Gaal himself despised, as he always believed that he had been "fair" as a coach. Although he had several controversial conflicts with his players, the press, and members of his teams' management staff throughout his career, he was known for his leadership, and often saw himself as a "relationship" manager, who saw the importance of the mental aspect of the game, and was known for his ability to develop young players, promote his philosophy, and create strong relationships with them, as was the case during his time at Ajax in the 90s.

In an interview with FIFA in January 2008, Van Gaal spoke of the importance of his football philosophy rather than the systems he used, as well as the need for flexibility as a coach, as demonstrated by his use of several formations throughout his career, such as the 4–3–3 and 3–3–1–3/3–4–3 with Ajax, the 2–3–2–3 at Barcelona, the 4–4–2 at AZ Alkmaar, and the 4–2–3–1 with Bayern Munich. He also believed that it was imperative to prepare the game well from a tactical standpoint as a coach, and for his teams' players to be disciplined and hard-working in their approach to training.

At Ajax, Van Gaal's style of using set patterns of play was inspired by Dutch total football, which was popularised by fellow former Ajax manager Rinus Michels; his players were therefore known for their quick passing as well as their versatility. He brought in experts from different sports as part of his coaching staff to improve the players' athletic qualities through rigorous training, including physiologist Jos Geysel, running coach and ex-basketball player Laszlo Jambor, and the club's strength and conditioning coach Rene Wormhoudt. Van Gaal also used Van der Sar as a sweeper keeper, who would not only rush out of his area to clear the ball away from danger, but also build-up plays from the back with his passing and ability with his feet; his defenders, in particular the sweeper in the centre of the back–three, were also required to be comfortable controlling and distributing the ball out from the back. The team were not only known for their technical ability, tactical sense, and exciting playing style, but for their athletic and physical qualities as well. Defensively, Van Gaal also made use of a high defensive line and pressing off the ball when not in possession.

Van Gaal believed in playing attractive attacking football based on possession, with which his teams became associated in his early career; however, he also believed that success was imperative above all. At AZ Alkmaar, although he initially retained his traditional Dutch style, he later also adopted a more counter-attacking style en route to winning the league title in 2009. He also deviated from the traditional Dutch style as head coach of the Netherlands during the 2014 World Cup; he played in a more defensive–minded counter-attacking style, using a 5–3–2/3–5–2 formation, which used aspects of man-marking and overlapping wing-backs. The system proved to be successful against defending champions Spain's tiki-taka possession-based style in the team's first-round victory, and complemented the qualities of the team's forwards. Van Gaal also used a similar counter-attacking tactical approach during his third spell as head coach of the Netherlands at the 2022 World Cup, using a 3–4–1–2 formation, which divided critics. During his time as manager of Manchester United, he also drew criticism from other managers and pundits for his perceived use of "long ball" tactics to Marouane Fellaini, something which Van Gaal himself denied, fielding Marouane Fellaini as a deep-lying target man up-front on occasion in a 4–3–3, in order to utilise his ability in the air.

Despite his achievements, Cruyff was often critical of what he perceived as being Van Gaal's more rigid coaching style, in comparison to his own more intuitive approach, commenting: "Van Gaal has a good vision on football. But it's not mine. He wants to gel winning teams and has a militaristic way of working with his tactics. I don't. I want individuals to think for themselves and take the decision on the pitch that is best for the situation... I don't have anything against computers, but you judge football players intuitively and with your heart. On the basis of the criteria which are now in use at Ajax [recommended by Van Gaal] I would have failed the test. When I was 15, I could barely kick the ball 15 metres with my left and with the right maybe 20 metres. I would not have been able to take a corner. Besides, I was physically weak and relatively slow. My two qualities were great technique and insight, which happen to be two things you cannot measure with a computer."

== Personal life ==
The youngest of nine brothers and sisters, Van Gaal was brought up as a Catholic. His father, a salesman, died when Van Gaal was 11. At the age of 18, Van Gaal met Fernanda Obbes at a Catholic youth group. They married three years later, and had two daughters, Brenda and Renate. In 1994, Obbes died of liver and pancreatic cancer. Van Gaal was mocked by fans of Ajax's opponents for her illness. In 2008, Van Gaal married his current wife, Truus, with whom he shares a holiday home near Albufeira, Algarve, Portugal.

According to The Daily Telegraph, it emerged in 2009 that Van Gaal had lost millions of pounds investing in fraudster Bernie Madoff's Ponzi scheme.

On 3 April 2022, Van Gaal said that he was receiving treatment for prostate cancer. On 12 April 2022, he said that his treatment was successful.

== In media ==
In 2000, Van Gaal appeared in Nike's "The Mission" campaign advertising their Total 90 range of football equipment. In the advert, Van Gaal sends a team of Nike-sponsored players to retrieve a Nike Geo Merlin ball being held in a secure facility by robot ninjas. Oliver Bierhoff protests, "It's just a ball", to which Van Gaal responds, "No! It's rounder!" After the players retrieve the ball, Van Gaal pilots the escape helicopter to safety.

In 2022, Geertjan Lassche made a two-hour documentary about Louis van Gaal, entitled Louis, with the tagline "The man behind the legend". It premiered on 11 April at the Tuschinski Theatre in Amsterdam. It was released on 14 April 2022.

== Career statistics ==
=== Club ===
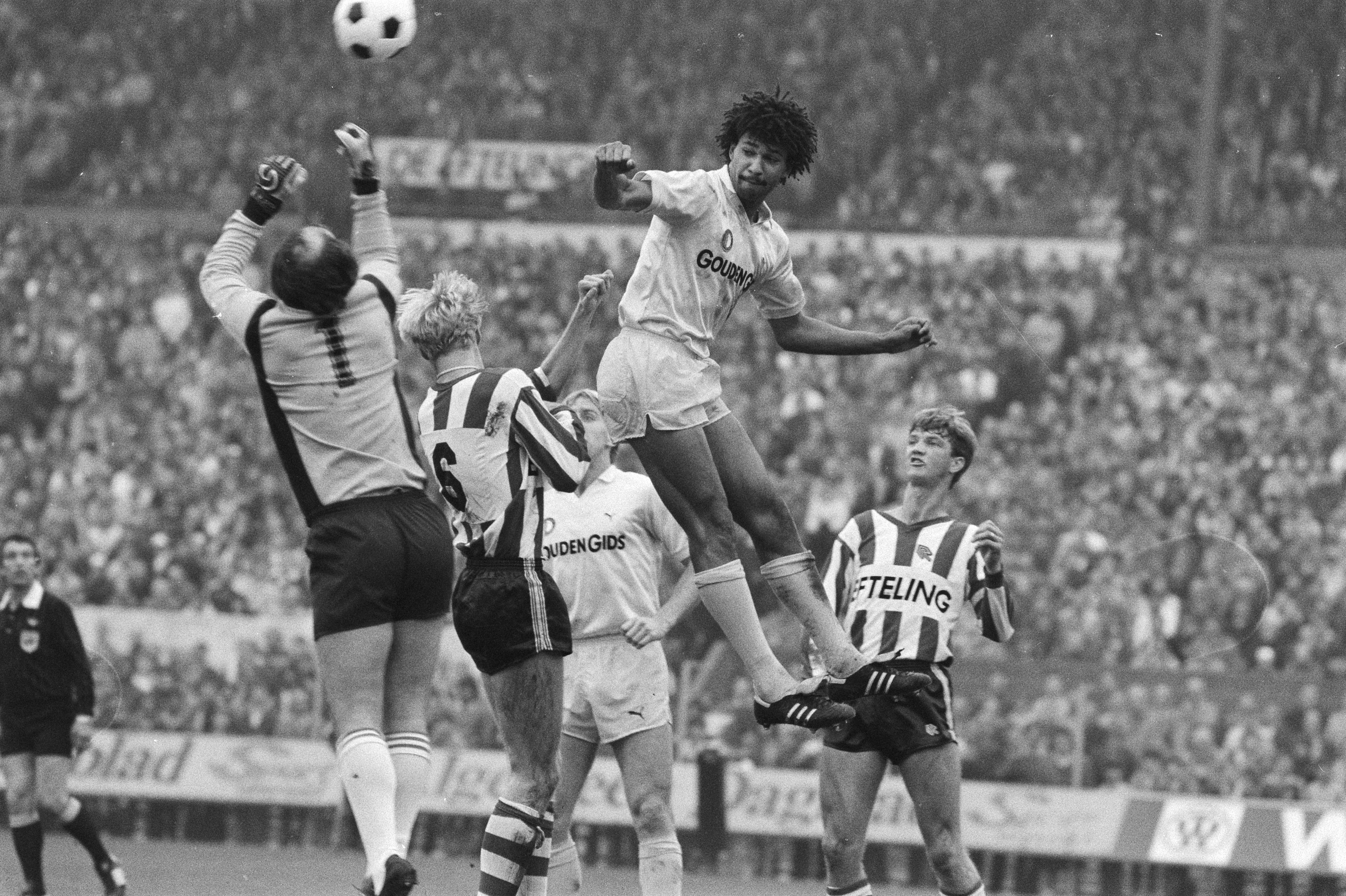
Van Gaal (right) playing for Sparta Rotterdam in 1983 against Feyenoord's Ruud Gullit

Club	Season	League		Cup		Europe		Total	
Club	Season	Apps	Goals	Apps	Goals	Apps	Goals	Apps	Goals
Ajax	1971–72	0	0	0	0	0	0	0	0
Ajax	1972–73	0	0	0	0	0	0	0	0
Ajax	Total	0	0	0	0	0	0	0	0
Royal Antwerp	1973–74	9	2	3	0	—		12	2
Royal Antwerp	1974–75	3	0	6	2	—		9	2
Royal Antwerp	1975–76	19	4	2	2	4	0	25	6
Royal Antwerp	1976–77	10	1	1	0	—		11	1
Royal Antwerp	Total	41	7	12	4	4	0	57	11
Telstar	1977–78	25	1	—		—		25	1
Sparta Rotterdam	1978–79	31	5	—		—		31	5
Sparta Rotterdam	1979–80	33	1	—		—		33	1
Sparta Rotterdam	1980–81	33	5	—		—		33	5
Sparta Rotterdam	1981–82	24	1	—		—		24	1
Sparta Rotterdam	1982–83	33	5	—		—		33	5
Sparta Rotterdam	1983–84	34	2	—		6	0	40	2
Sparta Rotterdam	1984–85	30	4	3	0	—		33	4
Sparta Rotterdam	1985–86	31	3	—		4	0	35	3
Sparta Rotterdam	Total	248	26	3	0	10	0	261	26
AZ	1986–87	17	0	—		—		17	0
Career totals		331	34	15	4	14	0	360	38

== Managerial statistics ==
As of 9 December 2022

Managerial record by team and tenure
Team	From	To	Record					Ref.
Team	From	To	G	W	D	L	Win %	Ref.
Ajax	28 September 1991	30 June 1997	285	196	49	40	68.77	
Barcelona	1 July 1997	20 May 2000	171	95	32	44	55.56	
Netherlands	7 July 2000	30 November 2001	14	8	4	2	57.14	
Netherlands U20	5 June 2001	2 July 2001	5	2	1	2	40.00	
Barcelona	1 July 2002	28 January 2003	30	16	5	9	53.33	
AZ	1 July 2005	30 June 2009	182	105	39	38	57.69	
Bayern Munich	1 July 2009	10 April 2011	96	59	18	19	61.46	
Netherlands	6 July 2012	12 July 2014	29	19	8	2	65.52	
Manchester United	16 July 2014	23 May 2016	103	54	25	24	52.43	
Netherlands	4 August 2021	9 December 2022	20	14	6	0	70.00	
Career Total			930	566	186	178	60.86	

== Honours ==
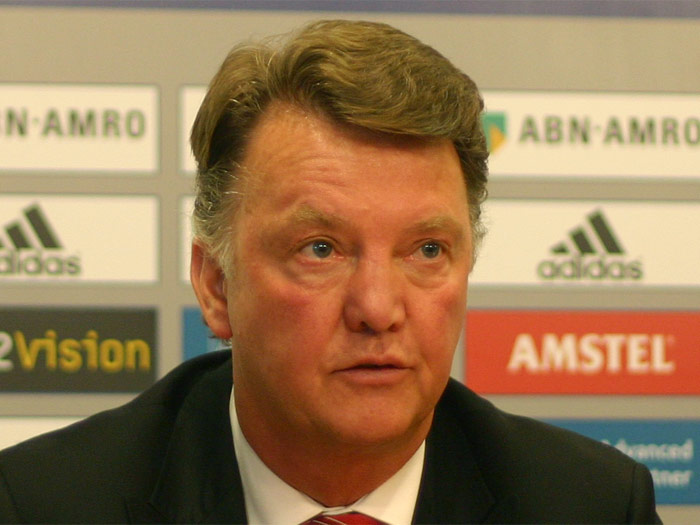
Louis van Gaal in 2010

=== Manager ===
Ajax

- Eredivisie: 1993–94, 1994–95, 1995–96
- KNVB Cup: 1992–93
- Johan Cruyff Shield: 1993, 1994, 1995
- UEFA Champions League: 1994–95; runner-up: 1995–96
- UEFA Cup: 1991–92
- UEFA Super Cup: 1995
- Intercontinental Cup: 1995

Barcelona

- La Liga: 1997–98, 1998–99
- Copa del Rey: 1997–98
- UEFA Super Cup: 1997

AZ

- Eredivisie: 2008–09

Bayern Munich

- Bundesliga: 2009–10
- DFB-Pokal: 2009–10
- DFL-Supercup: 2010
- UEFA Champions League runner-up: 2009–10

Manchester United

- FA Cup: 2015–16

Netherlands

- FIFA World Cup third place: 2014

=== Awards and achievements ===
- World Soccer Manager of the Year: 1995
- Onze d'Or Coach of the Year: 1995
- El País Manager of the Year: 1995
- Rinus Michels Award: 2007, 2009
- Rinus Michels Lifetime Achievement Award (Rinus Michels Oeuvreprijs): 2013
- Dutch Sports Coach of the Year: 2009, 2014
- Die Sprachwahrer des Jahres (3rd place): 2009
- Football Manager of the Year (Germany): 2010
- VDV Bundesliga Coach of the Season: 2009–10
- Anton Geesink Award: 2015
- Dutch Lifetime Achievement Award: 2017
- France Football 18th Greatest Manager of All Time: 2019
- Eredivisie Oeuvre Award: 2023

=== Orders ===
- Knight of the Order of Orange-Nassau: 1997

== Publications ==
- De trainer en de totale mens, Leipzig, Leibniz-Blätter-Verlag, 2021.

== See also ==
- List of European Cup and UEFA Champions League winning managers
- List of UEFA Cup winning managers
- List of investors in Bernard L. Madoff Securities
