= Kees Rijvers =

Dutch football player and manager (1926–2024)

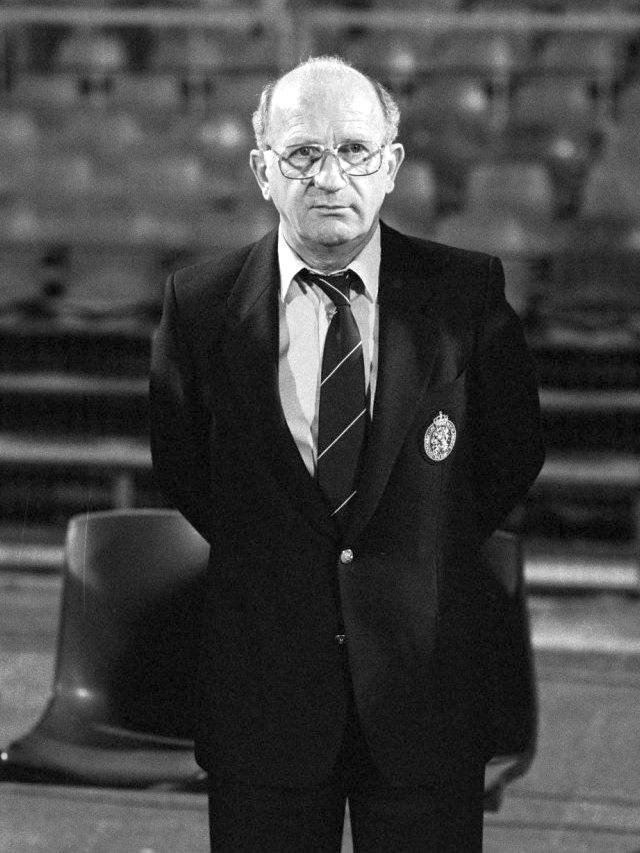
- Rijvers in 1982

Personal information
- Full name: Cornelus Bernardus Rijvers
- Date of birth: 27 May 1926
- Place of birth: Princenhage, Breda, Netherlands
- Date of death: 4 March 2024 (aged 97)
- Place of death: Breda, Netherlands
- Position: Midfielder

Youth career
- Groen Wit
- NAC Breda

Senior career*
Years	Team	Apps	(Gls)
1944–1950	NAC Breda	?	(?)
1950–1953	Saint-Étienne	76	(20)
1953–1955	Stade Français	?	(?)
1955–1957	Saint-Étienne	66	(16)
1957–1960	Feijenoord	92	(36)
1960–1962	Saint-Étienne	57	(15)
1962–1963	NAC Breda	14	(1)

International career
1946–1960	Netherlands	33	(10)

Managerial career
- 1964–1966: Willem II (assistant)
- 1966–1972: FC Twente
- 1972–1980: PSV Eindhoven
- 1980–1981: Beringen
- 1981–1984: Netherlands
- 1986–1989: FC Twente (technical director)
- 1994–1995: PSV Eindhoven
- * Club domestic league appearances and goals

Cornelis Bernardus "Kees" Rijvers (27 May 1926 – 4 March 2024) was a Dutch footballer who was active as a midfielder and later as coach for PSV Eindhoven and the Netherlands national team.

== Playing career ==
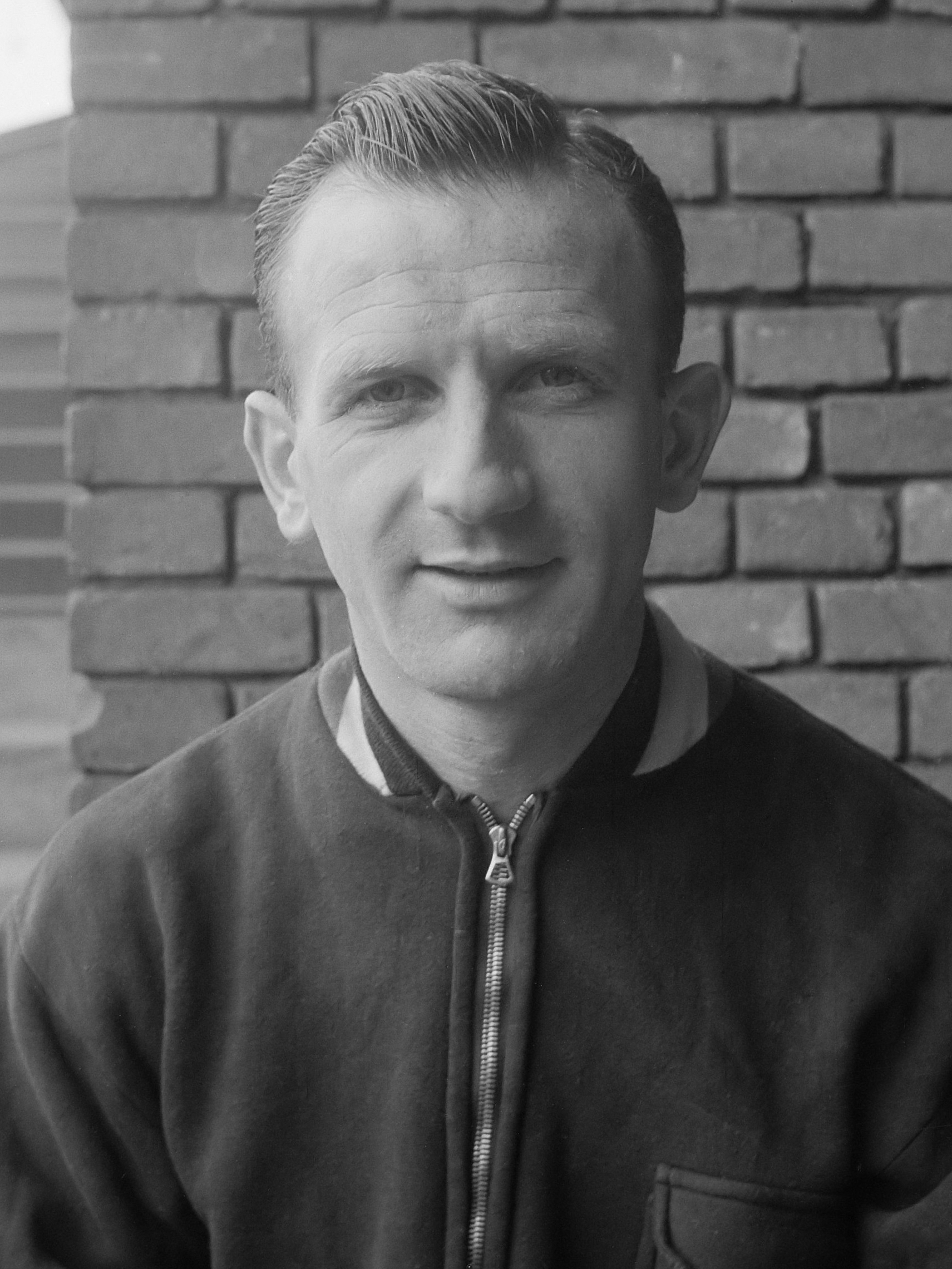
Rijvers in 1957

Rijvers made his debut at NAC Breda and also played for AS Saint-Étienne, Stade Français and Feijenoord. He was a member of the Netherlands team at the 1948 Summer Olympic Games.

In 1950 Rijvers became one of the first Dutch players to turn professional with his transfer to AS Saint-Étienne. The KNVB suspended him from playing in the national team in response because at the time they didn't allow professional players to play in the national team and it wasn't until 1957 he would play in the national team again. With Faas Wilkes and Abe Lenstra, Rijvers formed the renowned Gouden Binnentrio (The Golden Inner Three) of the Dutch national team between the late 1940s and 1950s; though the three only played together in ten matches, they scored 23 goals.

Together with other Dutch professional players from foreign leagues, Rijvers was one of the players to play the Watersnoodwedstrijd on 12 March 1953, a match played in the Parc des Princes stadium in Paris to raise money for the victims of the North Sea flood of 1953. While the KNVB, which still did not want to be connected to the professional players in any way, forbade the match, it went ahead after a personal intervention from Prince Bernhard.

Following the death of Marcelino Campanal in May 2020, Rijvers became the final surviving player (and the first ever Dutch player) who received at least one vote during the inaugural edition (1956) of the Ballon d'Or.

== Coaching career ==
As a manager, Rijvers started at FC Twente and coached the team for six years, with good results. After those successful seasons, he moved to PSV Eindhoven in 1972. He led the team to win the 1977–78 UEFA Cup and he also won three Eredivisie titles, in 1975, 1976 and 1978, and the double in 1976 with PSV.

After leaving PSV and a short stint at Beringen in Belgium, he took over the Dutch national team in February 1981 and introduced young players like Ronald Koeman, Ruud Gullit, Frank Rijkaard, and Marco van Basten. Under Rijvers' management, the Netherlands national team failed to qualify for both 1982 FIFA World Cup and UEFA Euro 1984. Whilst having better goal difference than Spain until the last day of the qualification for UEFA Euro 1984, the Netherlands ended second in the group due to Spain's controversial 12-1 win against Malta. Rijvers still started the qualification for 1986 FIFA World Cup, but resigned in November 1984 after the Dutch team lost the first home match of the qualification against Hungary in October 1984.

Erik ten Hag has named Rijvers among the managers who have inspired his coaching career.

== Personal life and death ==
Rijvers was born in Breda on 27 May 1926. He died on 4 March 2024, at the age of 97. In the weekend after Rijvers' death, all matches in Dutch professional football observed a one-minute silence prior to kick-off.

His granddaughter Antje Veld published a biography of Rijvers in May 2016.

== Career statistics ==
=== International ===
Appearances and goals by national team and year
National team	Year	Apps	Goals
Netherlands	1946	3	2
Netherlands	1947	4	2
Netherlands	1948	7	0
Netherlands	1949	1	0
Netherlands	1950	4	1
Netherlands	1951	0	0
Netherlands	1952	0	0
Netherlands	1953	0	0
Netherlands	1954	0	0
Netherlands	1955	0	0
Netherlands	1956	0	0
Netherlands	1957	2	1
Netherlands	1958	0	0
Netherlands	1959	6	2
Netherlands	1960	6	2
Total		33	10

Scores and results list the Netherlands' goal tally first, score column indicates score after each Rijvers goal.

List of international goals scored by Kees Rijvers
No.	Date	Venue	Opponent	Score	Result	Competition
1	10 March 1946	Stade Municipal, Luxembourg City, Luxembourg	Luxembourg	4–1	6–2	Friendly
2	12 May 1946	Olympisch Stadion, Amsterdam, Netherlands	Belgium	4–3	6–3	Friendly
3	21 September 1947	Olympisch Stadion, Amsterdam, Netherlands	Switzerland	3–1	6–2	Friendly
4	21 September 1947	Olympisch Stadion, Amsterdam, Netherlands	Switzerland	5-2	6–2	Friendly
5	15 October 1950	Stadion Rankhof Basel, Switzerland	Switzerland	3–2	5–7	Friendly
6	11 September 1957	De Kuip, Rotterdam, Netherlands	Luxembourg	5–1	5–2	1958 FIFA World Cup qualification
7	4 October 1959	De Kuip, Rotterdam, Netherlands	Belgium	1–0	9–1	Friendly
8	4 November 1959	De Kuip, Rotterdam, Netherlands	Norway	1–1	7–1	Friendly
9	24 April 1960	Bosuilstadion, Antwerp, Belgium	Belgium	1–1	1–2	Friendly
10	18 May 1960	Letzigrund, Zurich, Switzerland	Switzerland	1–0	1–3	Friendly

== Honours ==
=== Player ===
NAC Breda

- Eerste Klasse: 1945–46

Saint-Étienne

- Ligue 1: 1956–57
- Coupe de France: 1961–62

=== Manager ===
PSV

- Eredivisie: 1974–75, 1975–76, 1977–78
- KNVB Beker: 1973–74, 1975–76
- UEFA Cup: 1977–78

=== Individual ===
- Rinus Michels Lifetime Achievement Award (Rinus Michels Oeuvreprijs): 2004

== See also ==
- List of UEFA Cup winning managers

Awards
Preceded by N/A	Rinus Michels oeuvre award 2004	Succeeded by Piet de Visser
