= Peter Wesselink =

Dutch footballer and manager

Personal information
- Date of birth: 24 May 1968 (age 58)
- Place of birth: Apeldoorn, Netherlands

Youth career
- 1977–1985: Apeldoornse Boys
- 1985–1987: AGOVV

Senior career*
Years	Team	Apps	(Gls)
1987–1990	Go Ahead Eagles		
1990–1992	Vitesse	3	(0)
1992–1994	GVVV		
1994–1999	Rohda Raalte		
1999–2000	Robur et Velocitas		

Managerial career
- 2001–2005: Vaassen
- 2005–2009: CSV Apeldoorn
- 2009–2011: SVZW
- 2012: Spakenburg
- 2012–2013: Silvolde
- 2013–2016: DTS Ede
- 2016–2020: Excelsior '31
- 2020–2022: DVS '33
- 2023–2025: SV Urk
- * Club domestic league appearances and goals

Peter Wesselink (born 24 May 1968) is a Dutch football manager and a former professional footballer for Go Ahead Eagles in the Eredivisie and Vitesse in the Eerste Divisie. He played in the position of midfielder. In two consecutive years, he led SVZW to Eerste Klasse and Hoofdklasse championships, promoting it to the Topklasse. For this achievement Wesselink won the 2011 Rinus Michels Award for best manager in Dutch amateur leagues. In 2016, he began coaching Excelsior '31. In 2020, he became the manager of DVS '33, succeeding Mimoun Ouaali in the position. In 2022 Wesselink left DVS'33 after a dispute with club management. In 2023 he signed a two-year contract with SV Urk.
