= Sir Matt Busby Player of the Year =

Manchester United football award

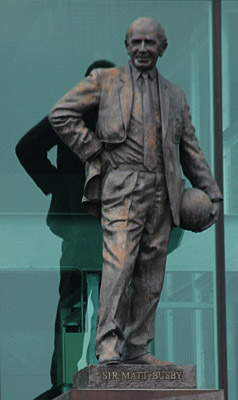
- The trophy is a scaled-down replica of this statue of Sir Matt Busby outside Old Trafford
- Sport: Association football

History
- First award: 1988
- Editions: 39 (as of 2026)
- First winner: (Scotland) Brian McClair
- Most wins: (Portugal) Bruno Fernandes (5 times)
- Most recent: (Portugal) Bruno Fernandes (5th win)

The Sir Matt Busby Player of the Year, previously known as the MUFC Members Player of the Year (1988–1995), is an award presented to the Manchester United fans' player of the season. It is named after former Manchester United manager Sir Matt Busby, who managed the club in two spells, from 1945 to 1969 and from 1970 to 1971. The award was renamed in his honour in 1996, following his death in 1994, and a new trophy was commissioned – a scaled-down replica of the statue of Busby at the east end of Old Trafford.

The first winner of the award was Brian McClair in 1988, who also became the first player to win it twice, having also won it in 1992. Since then, seven other players have won the award more than once, of which five have won it in consecutive seasons: Roy Keane (1999, 2000), Ruud van Nistelrooy (2002, 2003), Cristiano Ronaldo (2004, 2007, 2008), David de Gea (2014, 2015, 2016), and Bruno Fernandes (2020, 2021 and 2024, 2025, 2026). Ronaldo's 2008 win made him the first player to receive the award three times, having also won in 2004. De Gea won the award in 2016 for the third consecutive year, becoming the second player after Ronaldo to do so, and the first in three consecutive seasons. Bruno Fernandes won the award for a fifth time in 2026, as the first player to do so, and second player to win the award for three consecutive years.

Voting takes place towards the end of each season, usually in April, and is open to anyone who has an account on the club's official website. Voting was originally done by post until the 1994–95 season, when a phone voting system was introduced. Postal voting forms were included in the club magazine, Inside United, and before that, voting was open only to members of the official supporters' club, who would receive a voting form in the post at the end of the season. Until the establishment of the official supporters' club, a separate award had been given by the members of its predecessor, the independent Manchester United Supporters Club.

Other end-of-season awards given by Manchester United include the Denzil Haroun Reserve Player of the Year Award, the Jimmy Murphy Young Player of the Year Award, the Players' Player of the Year Award, and the Goal of the Season Award. Of these, the Jimmy Murphy Young Player of the Year Award and the Players' Player of the Year Award are voted for by the players. The prizes for all five awards are given at an annual awards night, which is held near the end of the league season and broadcast live on the club's television channel, MUTV. A list of winners of the youth awards can be seen here.

== Winners ==
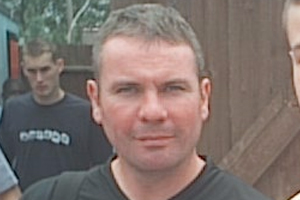
Brian McClair won the inaugural award in 1988, and became the first player to win the award twice when he won it again in 1991.

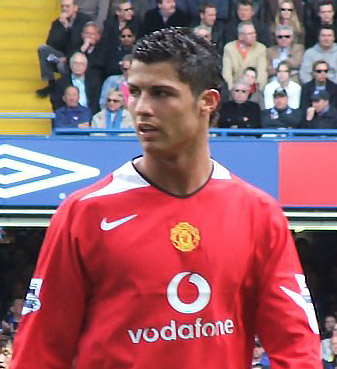
Cristiano Ronaldo is the one of only two players to have won the award four times.

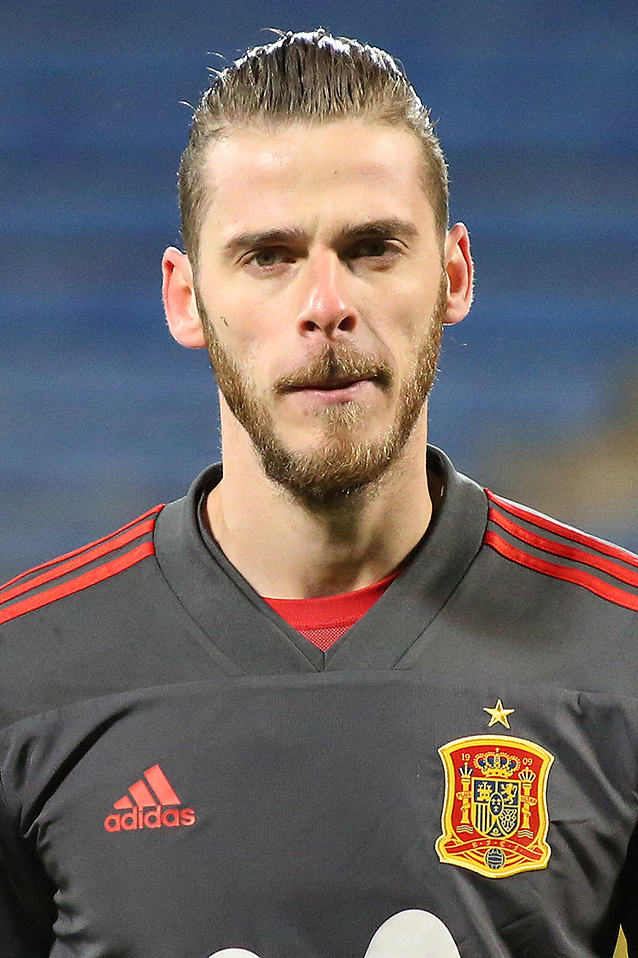
David de Gea has four wins, and was the first to win the award in three consecutive seasons.

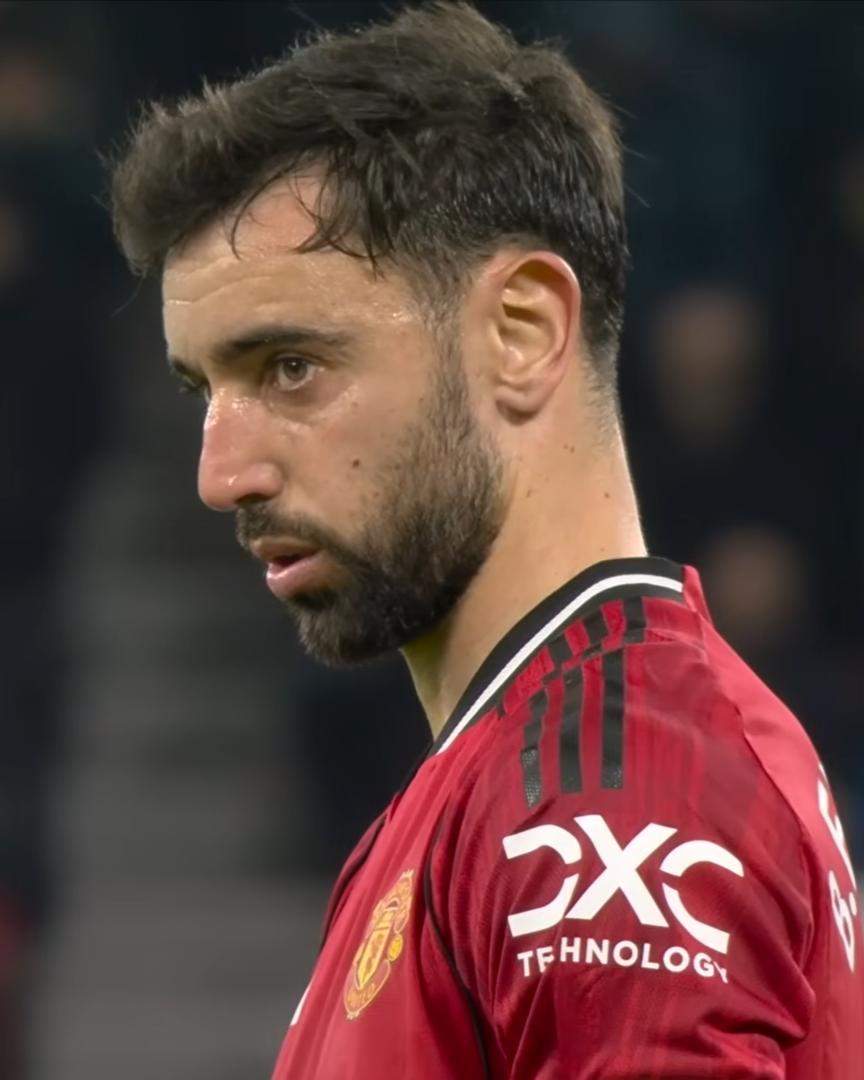
Bruno Fernandes has the most wins with five.

Players in bold are still playing for Manchester United

Season	Name	Nationality	Position	Notes	Ref.
1987–88	Brian McClair	Scotland	Forward		
1988–89	Bryan Robson	England	Midfielder	First English winner	
1989–90	Gary Pallister	England	Defender		
1990–91	Mark Hughes	Wales	Forward	First Academy graduate to win award	
1991–92	Brian McClair	Scotland	Forward	First player to win the award on two occasions	
1992–93	Paul Ince	England	Midfielder		
1993–94	Eric Cantona	France	Forward	First winner from outside the United Kingdom	
1994–95	Andrei Kanchelskis	Russia	Midfielder		
1995–96	Eric Cantona	France	Forward		
1996–97	David Beckham	England	Midfielder		
1997–98	Ryan Giggs	Wales	Midfielder		
1998–99	Roy Keane	Republic of Ireland	Midfielder		
1999–2000	Roy Keane	Republic of Ireland	Midfielder	First player to win the award in consecutive years	
2000–01	Teddy Sheringham	England	Forward		
2001–02	Ruud van Nistelrooy	Netherlands	Forward		
2002–03	Ruud van Nistelrooy	Netherlands	Forward		
2003–04	Cristiano Ronaldo	Portugal	Midfielder		
2004–05	Gabriel Heinze	Argentina	Defender	First winner from outside Europe	
2005–06	Wayne Rooney	England	Forward		
2006–07	Cristiano Ronaldo	Portugal	Midfielder		
2007–08	Cristiano Ronaldo	Portugal	Midfielder	First player to win the award on three occasions	
2008–09	Nemanja Vidić	Serbia	Defender		
2009–10	Wayne Rooney	England	Forward		
2010–11	Javier Hernández	Mexico	Forward	First winner from North America	
2011–12	Antonio Valencia	Ecuador	Midfielder		
2012–13	Robin van Persie	Netherlands	Forward		
2013–14	David de Gea	Spain	Goalkeeper	First goalkeeper to win the award	
2014–15	David de Gea	Spain	Goalkeeper		
2015–16	David de Gea	Spain	Goalkeeper	First player to win the award in three consecutive years	
2016–17	Ander Herrera	Spain	Midfielder		
2017–18	David de Gea	Spain	Goalkeeper	First player to win the award on four occasions	
2018–19	**Luke Shaw**	England	Defender		
2019–20	**Bruno Fernandes**	Portugal	Midfielder		
2020–21	**Bruno Fernandes**	Portugal	Midfielder		
2021–22	Cristiano Ronaldo	Portugal	Forward	Record-equalling fourth award	
2022–23	**Marcus Rashford**	England	Forward		
2023–24	**Bruno Fernandes**	Portugal	Midfielder		
2024–25	**Bruno Fernandes**	Portugal	Midfielder	Record-equalling fourth award	
2025–26	**Bruno Fernandes**	Portugal	Midfielder	Record-breaking fifth award	

=== Wins by player ===
Winner	Total wins	Year(s)
(Portugal) Bruno Fernandes	5	2020, 2021, 2024, 2025, 2026
(Portugal) Cristiano Ronaldo	4	2004, 2007, 2008, 2022
(Spain) David de Gea	4	2014, 2015, 2016, 2018
(Scotland) Brian McClair	2	1988, 1992
(France) Eric Cantona	2	1994, 1996
(Republic of Ireland) Roy Keane	2	1999, 2000
(Netherlands) Ruud van Nistelrooy	2	2002, 2003
(England) Wayne Rooney	2	2006, 2010
(England) Bryan Robson	1	1989
(England) Gary Pallister	1	1990
(Wales) Mark Hughes	1	1991
(England) Paul Ince	1	1993
(Russia) Andrei Kanchelskis	1	1995
(England) David Beckham	1	1997
(Wales) Ryan Giggs	1	1998
(England) Teddy Sheringham	1	2001
(Argentina) Gabriel Heinze	1	2005
(Serbia) Nemanja Vidić	1	2009
(Mexico) Javier Hernández	1	2011
(Ecuador) Antonio Valencia	1	2012
(Netherlands) Robin van Persie	1	2013
(Spain) Ander Herrera	1	2017
(England) Luke Shaw	1	2019
(England) Marcus Rashford	1	2023

=== Wins by playing position ===
Position	Number of wins
Goalkeeper	4
Defender	4
Midfielder	16
Forward	14

=== Wins by nationality ===
Nationality	Number of winners
England	9
Portugal	9
Spain	5
Netherlands	3
France	2
Republic of Ireland	2
Scotland	2
Wales	2
Argentina	1
Russia	1
Serbia	1
Mexico	1
Ecuador	1

== Players' Player of the Year ==
Season	Name	Nationality	Position	Notes	Ref.
2005–06	Ryan Giggs	Wales	Midfielder	Inaugural winner	
2006–07	Cristiano Ronaldo	Portugal	Forward	First non-British winner	
2007–08	Cristiano Ronaldo	Portugal	Forward	First player to win the award in consecutive years	
2008–09	Nemanja Vidić	Serbia	Defender		
2009–10	Wayne Rooney	England	Forward	First English winner	
2010–11	Nani	Portugal	Forward		
2011–12	Antonio Valencia	Ecuador	Forward	First non-European winner	
2012–13	Michael Carrick	England	Midfielder		
2013–14	David de Gea	Spain	Goalkeeper		
2014–15	David de Gea	Spain	Goalkeeper		
2015–16	Chris Smalling	England	Defender		
2016–17	Antonio Valencia	Ecuador	Defender		
2017–18	David de Gea	Spain	Goalkeeper	First player to win the award on three occasions	
2018–19	Luke Shaw	England	Defender		
2019–20	Anthony Martial	France	Forward		
2020–21	Luke Shaw	England	Defender		
2021–22	David de Gea	Spain	Goalkeeper	First player to win the award on four occasions	
2022–23	Marcus Rashford	England	Forward		
2023–24	Diogo Dalot	Portugal	Defender		
2024–25	Bruno Fernandes	Portugal	Midfielder		
2025–26	Bruno Fernandes	Portugal	Midfielder		

== Manager's Player of the Year ==
Season	Name	Nationality	Position	Notes	Ref.
2017–18	Scott McTominay	Scotland	Midfielder	Special award	
