= 2014–15 Manchester United F.C. season =

English football club season

Manchester United
2014–15 season
- Co-chairmen: Joel and Avram Glazer
- Manager: Louis van Gaal
- Stadium: Old Trafford
- Premier League: 4th
- FA Cup: Sixth round
- League Cup: Second round
- Top goalscorer: League: Wayne Rooney (12); All: Wayne Rooney (14)
- Highest home attendance: 75,454 (vs. West Bromwich Albion, 2 May)
- Lowest home attendance: 74,285 (vs. Arsenal, 9 March)
- Average home league attendance: 75,335
Home colours	Away colours	Third colours

The 2014–15 season was Manchester United's 23rd season in the Premier League, and their 40th consecutive season in the top-flight of English football.

United began the season on 16 August 2014, with the opening game of their Premier League campaign. They also competed in two domestic cups — the FA Cup and the League Cup. This was the first season since 1989–90 and in a non-ban season since 1981–82 that Manchester United did not compete in any European competition having finished seventh in the last Premier League season; the club had participated in the UEFA Champions League since the 1995–96 campaign and European competitions since 1990–91.

This was United's first trophyless season since 2004–05.

== Background ==
Louis van Gaal was announced as the new manager in May 2014 after the sacking of David Moyes in April. He appointed Ryan Giggs, who retired from playing, as assistant manager; Marcel Bout as assistant coach, specialising in oppositional scouting; and Frans Hoek as goalkeeping coach. Rio Ferdinand, Nemanja Vidić and Patrice Evra left the club. United completed their first signing of the season on 26 June 2014 with the acquisition of Ander Herrera from Athletic Bilbao for £29 million, and followed this up the following day with Luke Shaw from Southampton. Following the departures of Vidić and Evra, Wayne Rooney and Darren Fletcher were named as captain and vice-captain respectively.

== Pre-season and friendlies ==
Manchester United preceded their 2014–15 campaign with a tour of the United States. They played LA Galaxy in the Chevrolet Cup on 23 July, and also participated in the 2014 International Champions Cup from 26 July to 2 August, playing against Roma, Internazionale and Real Madrid in the group stage. The match against Real Madrid on 2 August set a US attendance record of 109,318. Having beaten Roma and Real Madrid in normal time, and Internazionale on penalties to win their group, they qualified for the final against Liverpool on 4 August. After going behind to a Steven Gerrard penalty in the first half, United rallied in the second with goals from Wayne Rooney, Juan Mata and Jesse Lingard to win 3–1. Upon their return to England, the team played against Valencia on 12 August in what was Louis van Gaal's first home match as Manchester United manager.

Date	Opponents	H / A	Result F–A	Scorers	Attendance
23 July 2014	LA Galaxy	N	7–0	Welbeck 13', Rooney (2) 42' (pen.), 45', James (2) 62', 84', Young (2) 88', 90'	86,432
26 July 2014	Roma	N	3–2	Rooney (2) 36', 45' (pen.), Mata 39'	54,117
29 July 2014	Internazionale	N	0–0 (5–3p)		61,238
2 August 2014	Real Madrid	N	3–1	Young (2) 21', 37', Hernández 80'	109,318
4 August 2014	Liverpool	N	3–1	Rooney 55', Mata 57', Lingard 88'	51,014
12 August 2014	Valencia	H	2–1	Fletcher 49', Fellaini 90+1'	58,381

== Premier League ==
The fixtures for the 2014–15 league season were announced on 18 June 2014. Manchester United opened their Premier League campaign at home to Swansea City on 16 August 2014, and their last game of the season was away to Hull City on 24 May 2015. The season started off on the wrong foot for Manchester United, losing 2–1 at home to Swansea City, marking Swansea's first league win at Old Trafford in club history and the Red Devils' first home loss in a season opener since 1972. Juan Mata gave United the lead away at Sunderland but Jack Rodwell equalised on his debut, meaning the match finished as a draw, before United ended August with a laboured 0–0 draw against Burnley, despite Ángel Di María making his debut for the Red Devils.

The draw was followed up with United's first win of the season, a 4–0 thumping of Queens Park Rangers. However, the following week, 2–0 and 3–1 leads were blown as the Red Devils suffered a remarkable 5–3 defeat away to Leicester City. September concluded with a nervy 2–1 home win over West Ham United despite captain Wayne Rooney's sending-off for a reckless kick at the legs of Stewart Downing.

The next fixture, without club captain Rooney, was a morale-boosting 2–1 home victory over Everton, who had achieved the league double over United the previous season. Radamel Falcao netted the winner with his first goal for United. The next two matches were last-minute draws against West Bromwich Albion and league leaders Chelsea, respectively.

A United side which was severely depleted in defence then narrowly lost to city rivals Manchester City on 2 November, with Sergio Agüero's goal separating the teams at the City of Manchester Stadium. The next match, a 1–0 victory over Crystal Palace courtesy of a Juan Mata strike, ignited a six-match winning run that took United to third place in the table. Although United recorded wins over Premier League giants Arsenal, Liverpool and in-form Southampton, they were greatly indebted to Spanish goalkeeper David de Gea, who made many game-saving stops. United then drew away to Aston Villa, with new signing Falcao scoring his second goal for the club. The Boxing Day clash against Newcastle at Old Trafford was a 3–1 win, with Wayne Rooney scoring twice and assisting a goal for Robin van Persie.

The next game, only two days later, was a goalless draw away to Tottenham Hotspur. The result was the same against Stoke on New Year's Day, with Falcao's goal unable to win the game in a 1–1 draw. The following match, United ended their unbeaten streak with a home defeat to Southampton — the first time the Saints had won at Old Trafford in 27 years. Next week, United secured a 2–0 win against QPR at Loftus Road, with Marouane Fellaini and James Wilson scoring. On 31 January United beat Leicester City 3–1 at Old Trafford with goals from Van Persie and Falcao, thus gaining a measure of revenge for their early-season mauling at the King Power Stadium.

United had to claw back a 1–1 draw at Upton Park against West Ham on February 8 thanks to an equaliser in stoppage time from Daley Blind. After this, United won 3–1 against Burnley at Old Trafford, with two goals in the first half from substitute Chris Smalling, and a late penalty from Van Persie, although the Red Devils' performance was far from their best. On 21 February, United suffered their first away defeat since November as Swansea did the double on the Red Devils for the first time in their history, winning 2–1, resulting in United dropping to fourth place. United got back to winning ways with a 2–0 home victory over Sunderland, which was followed by a 1–0 away victory against Newcastle United on 4 March, the winner coming from Ashley Young after a late defensive error from Newcastle.

The following fixture, United secured a storming 3–0 home victory over Tottenham Hotspur to boost their chances of a top four finish. Their next game was against arch-rivals Liverpool at Anfield. United won the match courtesy of a brace from Juan Mata to secure the double over their rivals.

After the international break, United's next opponents were league strugglers Aston Villa at Old Trafford on 4 April 2015. United won the match 3–1 with a brace from Ander Herrera and a goal from Wayne Rooney to move up to third in the Premier League table. On 12 April 2015, United claimed their first Manchester derby win since 2012 over neighbours Manchester City – a stunning 4–2 victory with goals from Young, Fellaini, Mata, and Smalling. United failed to extend their winning run, and suffered their first defeat in six games to league leaders Chelsea. United then suffered their second straight defeat the following week, in a 3–0 loss to Everton. This meant the Red Devils had failed to win at Goodison Park for the third season running.

On 2 May 2015, Manchester United failed to bounce back as they suffered a 1–0 home defeat to West Bromwich Albion. It was the first time since 2001 that United lost three consecutive matches, meaning the Red Devils remained in fourth place. On 9 May 2015, United beat Crystal Palace 2–1 to end their losing run. In their penultimate game of the season on 17 May, United faced rivals Arsenal. The match ended in a 1–1 draw, ensuring the Red Devils would compete in the Champions League next season following a one-year absence. United's final match of the season against Hull City ended in a draw, relegating the Tigers, although they would have been relegated regardless of the result. Manchester United ended the season in fourth place – three places, and six points higher than the previous season.

Date	Opponents	H / A	Result F–A	Scorers	Attendance	League position
16 August 2014	Swansea City	H	1–2	Rooney 53'	75,339	16th
24 August 2014	Sunderland	A	1–1	Mata 17'	43,217	13th
30 August 2014	Burnley	A	0–0		31,399	14th
14 September 2014	Queens Park Rangers	H	4–0	Di María 24', Herrera 36', Rooney 44', Mata 58'	75,355	9th
21 September 2014	Leicester City	A	3–5	Van Persie 13', Di María 16', Herrera 57'	31,784	12th
27 September 2014	West Ham United	H	2–1	Rooney 5', Van Persie 22'	75,317	7th
5 October 2014	Everton	H	2–1	Di María 28', Falcao 63'	75,294	4th
20 October 2014	West Bromwich Albion	A	2–2	Fellaini 47', Blind 86'	25,794	6th
26 October 2014	Chelsea	H	1–1	Van Persie 90+4'	75,327	8th
2 November 2014	Manchester City	A	0–1		45,358	9th
8 November 2014	Crystal Palace	H	1–0	Mata 67'	75,325	6th
22 November 2014	Arsenal	A	2–1	Gibbs 56' (o.g.), Rooney 85'	60,074	4th
29 November 2014	Hull City	H	3–0	Smalling 16', Rooney 42', Van Persie 66'	75,345	4th
2 December 2014	Stoke City	H	2–1	Fellaini 21', Mata 59'	75,388	4th
8 December 2014	Southampton	A	2–1	Van Persie (2) 12', 71'	31,420	3rd
14 December 2014	Liverpool	H	3–0	Rooney 12', Mata 40', Van Persie 71'	75,331	3rd
20 December 2014	Aston Villa	A	1–1	Falcao 53'	41,273	3rd
26 December 2014	Newcastle United	H	3–1	Rooney (2) 23', 36', Van Persie 53'	75,318	3rd
28 December 2014	Tottenham Hotspur	A	0–0		35,711	3rd
1 January 2015	Stoke City	A	1–1	Falcao 26'	27,203	3rd
11 January 2015	Southampton	H	0–1		75,395	4th
17 January 2015	Queens Park Rangers	A	2–0	Fellaini 58', Wilson 90+4'	18,098	4th
31 January 2015	Leicester City	H	3–1	Van Persie 27', Falcao 31', Morgan 44' (o.g.)	75,329	3rd
8 February 2015	West Ham United	A	1–1	Blind 90+2'	34,499	4th
11 February 2015	Burnley	H	3–1	Smalling (2) 6', 45+3', Van Persie 82' (pen.)	75,356	3rd
21 February 2015	Swansea City	A	1–2	Herrera 28'	20,809	4th
28 February 2015	Sunderland	H	2–0	Rooney (2) 66' (pen.), 84'	75,344	3rd
4 March 2015	Newcastle United	A	1–0	Young 89'	49,801	4th
15 March 2015	Tottenham Hotspur	H	3–0	Fellaini 9', Carrick 19', Rooney 34'	75,112	4th
22 March 2015	Liverpool	A	2–1	Mata (2) 14', 59'	44,405	4th
4 April 2015	Aston Villa	H	3–1	Herrera (2) 43', 90+2', Rooney 79'	75,397	3rd
12 April 2015	Manchester City	H	4–2	Young 14', Fellaini 27', Mata 67', Smalling 73'	75,313	3rd
18 April 2015	Chelsea	A	0–1		41,422	3rd
26 April 2015	Everton	A	0–3		39,497	4th
2 May 2015	West Bromwich Albion	H	0–1		75,454	4th
9 May 2015	Crystal Palace	A	2–1	Mata 19' (pen.), Fellaini 78'	25,009	4th
17 May 2015	Arsenal	H	1–1	Herrera 30'	75,323	4th
24 May 2015	Hull City	A	0–0		24,745	4th

Pos	Team	Pld	W	D	L	GF	GA	GD	Pts	Qualification or relegation
2	Manchester City	38	24	7	7	83	38	+45	79	Qualification for the Champions League group stage
3	Arsenal	38	22	9	7	71	36	+35	75	Qualification for the Champions League group stage
4	Manchester United	38	20	10	8	62	37	+25	70	Qualification for the Champions League play-off round
5	Tottenham Hotspur	38	19	7	12	58	53	+5	64	Qualification for the Europa League group stage (Note: Since winners of the 2014–15 FA Cup, Arsenal, and winners of the 2014–15 Football League Cup, Chelsea, qualified for the Champions League based on league position, the spot awarded to the FA Cup winners (Europa League group stage) was passed to the sixth-placed team, Liverpool, and the spot awarded to the League Cup winners (Europa League third qualifying round) was passed to the seventh-placed team, Southampton, since those teams were the first teams in the table not already qualified for any European competition.)
6	Liverpool	38	18	8	12	52	48	+4	62	Qualification for the Europa League group stage

Source: Premier League
Rules for classification: 1) Points; 2) Goal difference; 3) Goals scored; 4) Play-offs (only if needed to decide champion, teams for relegation or teams for UEFA competitions).

== FA Cup ==
United entered the FA Cup at the Third Round stage with the other Premier League clubs, as well as those from the Championship. The draw was made on 8 December 2014, which saw United drawn away at Yeovil Town from League One. The match was played on 4 January 2015, with United winning 2–0 through second-half goals from Ander Herrera and Ángel Di María. United went on to face League Two side Cambridge United in the fourth round on 23 January 2015, but the match resulted in a goalless draw.

The replay took place on 3 February at Old Trafford, with Manchester United winning 3–0, after goals from Juan Mata, Marcos Rojo and James Wilson. In the fifth round, United were drawn away to Preston North End, which they won 3–1. United had to come from behind after Scott Laird opened the scoring for Preston in the 47th minute. Ander Herrera levelled the game 18 minutes later, and Marouane Fellaini put United ahead in the 72nd minute. Near the end, Wayne Rooney scored a penalty to seal a place in the sixth round, in which United were drawn in a home match to holders Arsenal, which was played on 9 March 2015. United lost the match 2–1, resulting in the Red Devils' exit from the FA Cup.

Date	Round	Opponents	H / A	Result F–A	Scorers	Attendance
4 January 2015	Round 3	Yeovil Town	A	2–0	Herrera 64', Di María 90'	9,264
23 January 2015	Round 4	Cambridge United	A	0–0		7,987
3 February 2015	Replay	Cambridge United	H	3–0	Mata 25', Rojo 32', Wilson 73'	74,511
16 February 2015	Round 5	Preston North End	A	3–1	Herrera 65', Fellaini 72', Rooney 88' (pen.)	21,348
9 March 2015	Round 6	Arsenal	H	1–2	Rooney 29'	74,285

== League Cup ==
United entered the League Cup at the Second Round stage for the first time since 1995–96, the last season before teams that had qualified for European competitions were allowed to enter the competition in the Third Round instead of the Second Round. The draw took place on 13 August 2014, with United being drawn away to League One side Milton Keynes Dons. It was the first ever meeting between the clubs, since the formation of MK Dons in 2004. Manchester United were thrashed by their League One counterparts. Will Grigg scored twice to capitalise on defensive mistakes by the United back three, while substitute Benik Afobe added two further goals. It was United's earliest League Cup exit and first to a third-tier team since a 4–3 aggregate defeat to York City of the Second Division back in 1995.

Date	Round	Opponents	H / A	Result F–A	Scorers	Attendance
26 August 2014	Round 2	Milton Keynes Dons	A	0–4		26,969

== Squad statistics ==
No.	Pos.	Name	League		FA Cup		League Cup		Total		Discipline	
No.	Pos.	Name	Apps	Goals	Apps	Goals	Apps	Goals	Apps	Goals	Yellow card	Red card
1	GK	(Spain) David de Gea	37	0	5	0	1	0	43	0	0	0
2	DF	(Brazil) Rafael	6(4)	0	1	0	0	0	7(4)	0	2	0
3	DF	(England) Luke Shaw	15(1)	0	3(1)	0	0	0	18(2)	0	1	1
4	DF	(England) Phil Jones	22	0	1(1)	0	0	0	23(1)	0	3	0
5	DF	(Argentina) Marcos Rojo	20(2)	0	4	1	0	0	24(2)	1	8	0
6	DF	(Northern Ireland) Jonny Evans	12(2)	0	1(1)	0	1	0	14(3)	0	1	0
7	MF	(Argentina) Ángel Di María	20(7)	3	4(1)	1	0	0	24(8)	4	2	1
8	MF	(Spain) Juan Mata	27(6)	9	1(1)	1	0	0	28(7)	10	2	0
9	FW	(Colombia) Radamel Falcao	14(12)	4	3	0	0	0	17(12)	4	2	0
10	FW	(England) Wayne Rooney (c)	33	12	4	2	0	0	37	14	5	1
11	MF	(Belgium) Adnan Januzaj	7(11)	0	1(1)	0	0(1)	0	8(13)	0	1	0
12	DF	(England) Chris Smalling	21(4)	4	4	0	0	0	25(4)	4	1	1
13	GK	(Denmark) Anders Lindegaard	0	0	0	0	0	0	0	0	0	0
16	MF	(England) Michael Carrick	16(2)	1	1(1)	0	0	0	17(3)	1	1	0
17	MF	(Netherlands) Daley Blind	25	2	4	0	0	0	29	2	4	0
18	MF	(England) Ashley Young	23(3)	2	1(2)	0	0	0	24(5)	2	6	0
19	FW	(England) Danny Welbeck	0(2)	0	0	0	1	0	1(2)	0	0	0
20	FW	(Netherlands) Robin van Persie	25(2)	10	1(1)	0	0	0	26(3)	10	5	0
21	MF	(Spain) Ander Herrera	19(7)	6	3(2)	2	0	0	22(9)	8	8	0
22	MF	(England) Nick Powell	0	0	0	0	1	0	1	0	0	0
23	MF	(England) Tom Cleverley	1	0	0	0	0	0	1	0	1	0
24	MF	(Scotland) Darren Fletcher (vc)	4(7)	0	1	0	0	0	5(7)	0	1	0
25	MF	(Ecuador) Antonio Valencia	29(3)	0	3	0	0	0	32(3)	0	4	0
26	MF	(Japan) Shinji Kagawa	0	0	0	0	1	0	1	0	0	0
28	MF	(Brazil) Anderson	0(1)	0	0	0	1	0	1(1)	0	0	0
29	FW	(England) Wilfried Zaha	0	0	0	0	0	0	0	0	0	0
30	DF	(Uruguay) Guillermo Varela	0	0	0	0	0	0	0	0	0	0
31	MF	(Belgium) Marouane Fellaini	19(8)	6	4	1	0	0	23(8)	7	7	1
32	GK	(Spain) Víctor Valdés	1(1)	0	0	0	0	0	1(1)	0	0	0
33	DF	(Northern Ireland) Paddy McNair	12(4)	0	2	0	0	0	14(4)	0	2	0
34	FW	(Wales) Tom Lawrence	0	0	0	0	0	0	0	0	0	0
35	MF	(England) Jesse Lingard	1	0	0	0	0	0	1	0	0	0
36	DF	(Belgium) Marnick Vermijl	0	0	0	0	1	0	1	0	0	0
37	DF	(Switzerland) Saidy Janko	0	0	0	0	1	0	1	0	0	0
38	DF	(England) Michael Keane	0(1)	0	0	0	1	0	1(1)	0	0	0
39	DF	(England) Tom Thorpe	0(1)	0	0	0	0	0	0(1)	0	0	0
40	GK	(England) Ben Amos	0	0	0	0	0	0	0	0	0	0
41	DF	(England) Reece James	0	0	0	0	1	0	1	0	1	0
42	DF	(England) Tyler Blackett	6(5)	0	1	0	0	0	7(5)	0	3	1
44	MF	(Brazil) Andreas Pereira	0(1)	0	0	0	0(1)	0	0(2)	0	0	0
45	MF	(Italy) Davide Petrucci	0	0	0	0	0	0	0	0	0	0
46	MF	(England) Joe Rothwell	0	0	0	0	0	0	0	0	0	0
48	FW	(England) Will Keane	0	0	0	0	0	0	0	0	0	0
49	FW	(England) James Wilson	2(11)	1	2(1)	1	0(1)	0	4(13)	2	4	0
50	GK	(England) Sam Johnstone	0	0	0	0	0	0	0	0	0	0
Own goals			–	2	–	0	–	0	–	2	–	–

Statistics accurate as of match played 24 May 2015.

== Transfers ==
=== In ===
Date	Pos.	Name	From	Fee
26 June 2014	MF	(Spain) Ander Herrera	(Spain) Athletic Bilbao	Undisclosed (Note: Fee reported as £29 million)
27 June 2014	DF	(England) Luke Shaw	(England) Southampton	Undisclosed (Note: Fee reported as £27 million)
4 August 2014	GK	(Serbia) Vanja Milinković-Savić	(Serbia) Vojvodina	€1.75m
20 August 2014	DF	(Argentina) Marcos Rojo	(Portugal) Sporting CP	£16m
26 August 2014	MF	(Argentina) Ángel Di María	(Spain) Real Madrid	£59.7m
1 September 2014	MF	(Netherlands) Daley Blind	(Netherlands) Ajax	£14m
2 September 2014	DF	(Netherlands) Timothy Fosu-Mensah	(Netherlands) Ajax	Undisclosed
8 January 2015	GK	(Spain) Víctor Valdés	Unattached	Free
30 January 2015	DF	(Libya) Sadiq El Fitouri	(England) Salford City	Undisclosed

=== Out ===
Date	Pos.	Name	To	Fee
28 June 2014	DF	(Netherlands) Alexander Büttner	(Russia) Dynamo Moscow	£4.4m
1 July 2014	FW	(England) Jack Barmby	(England) Leicester City	Free
1 July 2014	DF	(England) Rio Ferdinand	Released	
1 July 2014	FW	(Italy) Federico Macheda	(Wales) Cardiff City	Free
1 July 2014	DF	(Serbia) Nemanja Vidić	(Italy) Internazionale	Free
11 July 2014	MF	(Belgium) Charni Ekangamene	(Belgium) Zulte Waregem	Free
18 July 2014	DF	(England) Louis Rowley	(England) Leicester City	Free
21 July 2014	DF	(France) Patrice Evra	(Italy) Juventus	£1.2m
25 July 2014	FW	(Portugal) Bebé	(Portugal) Benfica	£2.4m
31 August 2014	MF	(Japan) Shinji Kagawa	(Germany) Borussia Dortmund	Undisclosed
1 September 2014	MF	(Wales) Tom Lawrence	(England) Leicester City	Undisclosed
1 September 2014	FW	(England) Danny Welbeck	(England) Arsenal	£16m
8 September 2014	MF	(Italy) Davide Petrucci	(Romania) CFR Cluj	Free
8 January 2015	DF	(England) Michael Keane	(England) Burnley	Undisclosed
2 February 2015	DF	(Belgium) Marnick Vermijl	(England) Sheffield Wednesday	Undisclosed
2 February 2015	MF	(Scotland) Darren Fletcher	(England) West Bromwich Albion	Free
2 February 2015	FW	(England) Wilfried Zaha	(England) Crystal Palace	£3m
3 February 2015	MF	(Brazil) Anderson	(Brazil) Internacional	Free

=== Loan in ===
Date from	Date to	Pos.	Name	From
1 September 2014	30 June 2015	FW	(Colombia) Radamel Falcao	(France) AS Monaco
2 February 2015	30 June 2015	DF	(England) Andy Kellett	(England) Bolton Wanderers

=== Loan out ===
Date from	Date to	Pos.	Name	To
4 August 2014	30 June 2015	GK	(Serbia) Vanja Milinković-Savić	(Serbia) Vojvodina
11 August 2014	30 June 2015	FW	(Chile) Ángelo Henríquez	(Croatia) Dinamo Zagreb
20 August 2014	30 June 2015	MF	(Portugal) Nani	(Portugal) Sporting CP
28 August 2014	2 February 2015	FW	(England) Wilfried Zaha	(England) Crystal Palace
1 September 2014	30 June 2015	FW	(Mexico) Javier Hernández	(Spain) Real Madrid
1 September 2014	2 January 2015	MF	(England) Nick Powell	(England) Leicester City
1 September 2014	31 January 2015	DF	(England) Michael Keane	(England) Burnley
1 September 2014	30 June 2015	MF	(England) Tom Cleverley	(England) Aston Villa
3 September 2014	30 June 2015	DF	(Uruguay) Guillermo Varela	(Spain) Real Madrid Castilla
27 October 2014	12 January 2015	GK	(England) Sam Johnstone	(England) Doncaster Rovers
26 November 2014	10 January 2015	DF	(England) Reece James	(England) Rotherham United
8 January 2015	30 June 2015	MF	(England) Ben Pearson	(England) Barnsley
12 January 2015	30 June 2015	GK	(England) Sam Johnstone	(England) Preston North End
22 January 2015	30 June 2015	FW	(England) Will Keane	(England) Sheffield Wednesday
27 January 2015	30 June 2015	MF	(England) Joe Rothwell	(England) Blackpool
30 January 2015	7 April 2015	GK	(England) Ben Amos	(England) Bolton Wanderers
2 February 2015	30 June 2015	MF	(England) Jesse Lingard	(England) Derby County
2 February 2015	30 June 2015	MF	(Switzerland) Saidy Janko	(England) Bolton Wanderers
26 March 2015	30 June 2015	DF	(England) Reece James	(England) Huddersfield Town
