= Luke Shaw =

English footballer (born 1995)

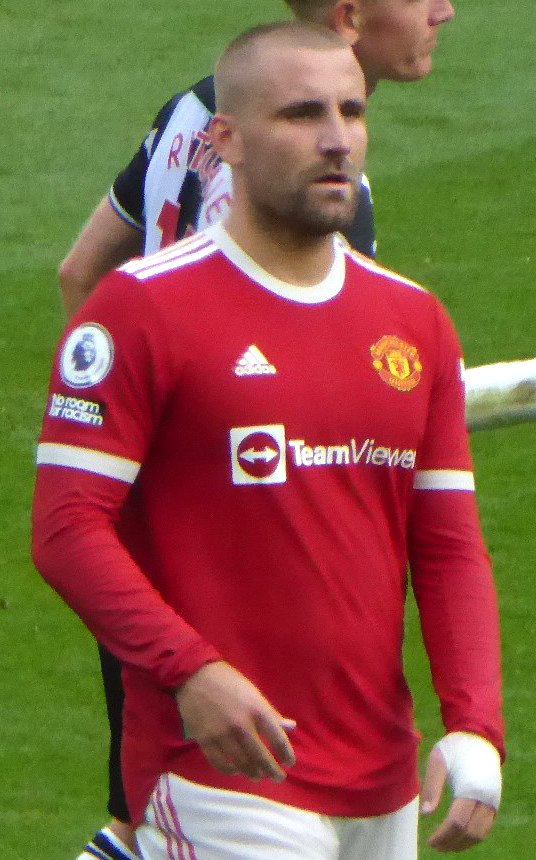
- Shaw playing for Manchester United in 2021

Personal information
- Full name: Luke Paul Hoare Shaw
- Date of birth: 12 July 1995 (age 31)
- Place of birth: Kingston upon Thames, Greater London, England
- Height: 5 ft 10 in (1.78 m)
- Positions: Left-back; centre-back

Team information
- Current team: Manchester United
- Number: 23

Youth career
- 2002–2011: Southampton

Senior career*
Years	Team	Apps	(Gls)
2011–2014	Southampton	60	(0)
2014–	Manchester United	241	(4)

International career
2011	England U16	6	(1)
2011–2012	England U17	8	(1)
2013–2014	England U21	5	(0)
2014–2024	England	34	(3)
Medal record
Men's football
Representing England
UEFA European Championship
Runner-up	2020 Europe	Team
Runner-up	2024 Germany	Team
- * Club domestic league appearances and goals as of 20:12, 10 October 2026 (UTC)

Luke Paul Hoare Shaw (born 12 July 1995) is an English professional footballer who plays as a left-back or centre-back for Premier League club Manchester United.

Originally a member of Southampton's youth system, Shaw made his first-team debut for the club in January 2012. He signed his first professional contract in May that year before becoming a regular in the Southampton team over the next two seasons. In June 2014, Shaw was signed by Manchester United for £30 million, then a world record transfer fee for a teenager.

Shaw made his senior international debut for England in March 2014, in a 1–0 friendly win against Denmark, and later that year was selected in the squad for the 2014 FIFA World Cup. He scored his first international goal in the UEFA Euro 2020 final, which was also the fastest scored in a UEFA European Championship final. He was also included in the squads for the 2022 FIFA World Cup and UEFA Euro 2024.

== Early life ==
Luke Paul Hoare Shaw was born on 12 July 1995 in Kingston upon Thames, Greater London, and raised in nearby Molesey, Surrey. He attended Chandlers Field Primary School and Rydens Enterprise School, where he helped the under-15 team reach the semi-finals of the English Schools' FA Cup.

He began playing grassroots football with Hersham and Molesey Juniors. Shaw grew up as a Chelsea supporter and idolised full-back Ashley Cole. He played at Chelsea's development centre in Guildford, but was not offered an academy place. He has said that he wanted to eventually play for the club.

== Club career ==
=== Southampton ===
==== Early career ====
In 2002, Shaw joined the Southampton Academy at the age of seven, and became a regular in the under-18 team from the age of 15. His first association with the first team came in September 2011, when he was an unused substitute in a League Cup match against Preston North End.

During the January 2012 transfer window, it was reported that Premier League clubs Arsenal, Chelsea, and Manchester City had shown interest in signing 16-year-old Shaw, with the then-Championship club reportedly valuing the defender at £4 million. Southampton quickly responded to such claims though, with then-manager Nigel Adkins assuring the media that "Luke Shaw is a big part of our future plans", and claiming that the club had "no intention … of letting any of [their] young players move on".

At the age of 16, Shaw made his debut for the Southampton first team on 28 January 2012 in the FA Cup, replacing winger Jason Puncheon for the final 13 minutes of the third round tie against Millwall, which finished 1–1. Following the club's promotion to the top flight in May 2012, Shaw was one of four youth players offered a professional contract for their return to the Premier League, along with Jack Stephens, Calum Chambers and James Ward-Prowse.

==== 2012–2014 ====
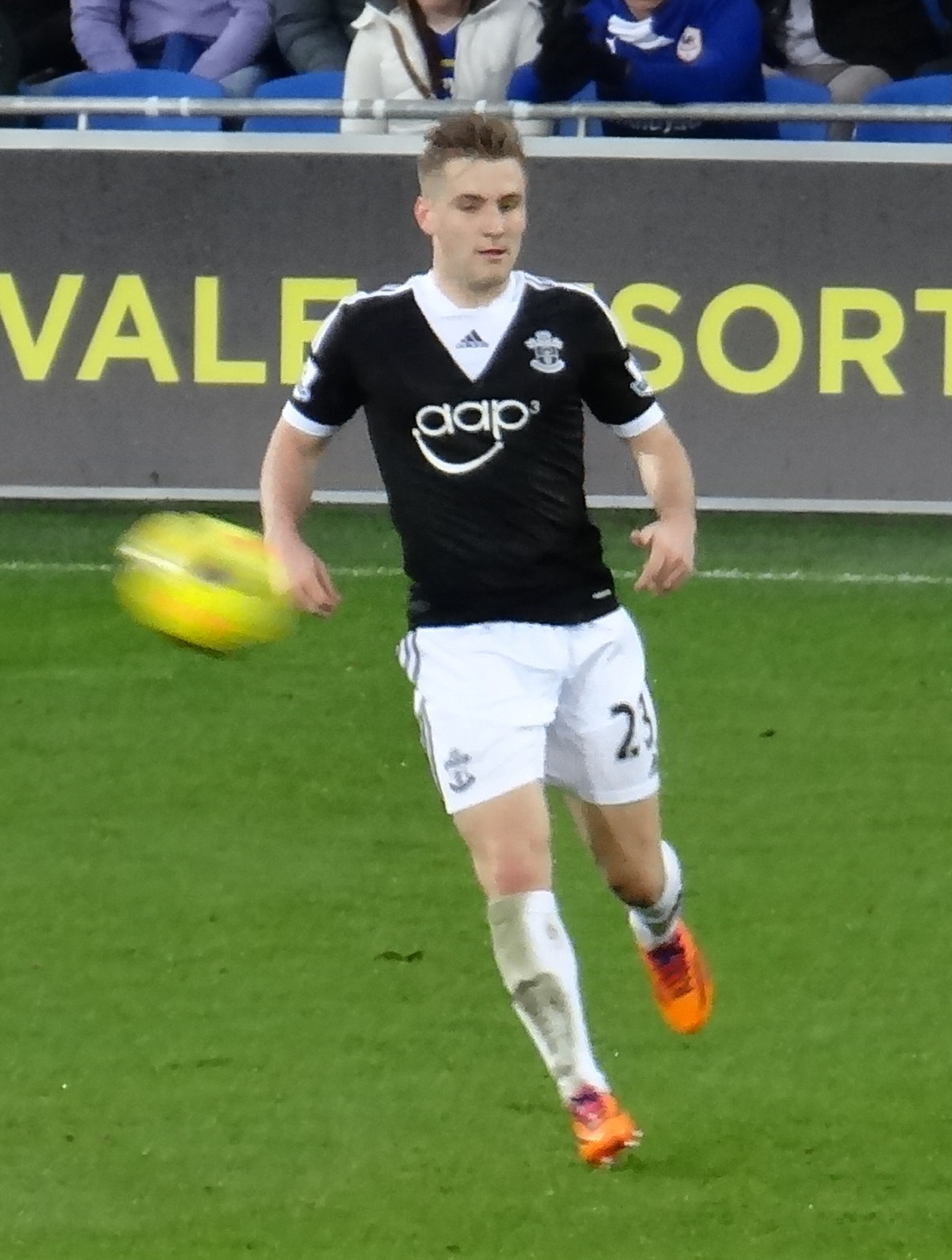
Shaw playing for Southampton in 2013

Shaw made his first start for the Southampton first team in August 2012, playing the full 90 minutes of a 4–1 win over Stevenage in the League Cup, and on 10 November 2012, he became the youngest Southampton player to start a match in the Premier League when he was chosen to play at left-back against Swansea City, completing 74 minutes of the 1–1 draw.

He continued to make regular appearances throughout the season, and in manager Nigel Adkins's final match as Southampton manager on 16 January 2013, he set up the second goal in a 2–2 draw away to Chelsea, providing a cross from the left wing for Jason Puncheon to convert in the 75th minute. Shaw finished his first professional season with 28 appearances for Southampton, including 25 in the Premier League.

On 12 July 2013, Shaw signed a new five-year contract with Southampton. In the first match of the 2013–14 season, Shaw was directly involved in the goal that saw Southampton win against West Bromwich Albion when he was fouled in the penalty area by Youssouf Mulumbu in the 89th minute, with Rickie Lambert converting the resulting spot kick to see the Saints edge victory.

On 18 April 2014, Shaw was named as one of the six players on the shortlist for the PFA Young Player of the Year award. He was also selected as left-back in the 2013–14 PFA Team of the Year.

=== Manchester United ===
==== 2014–2016 ====
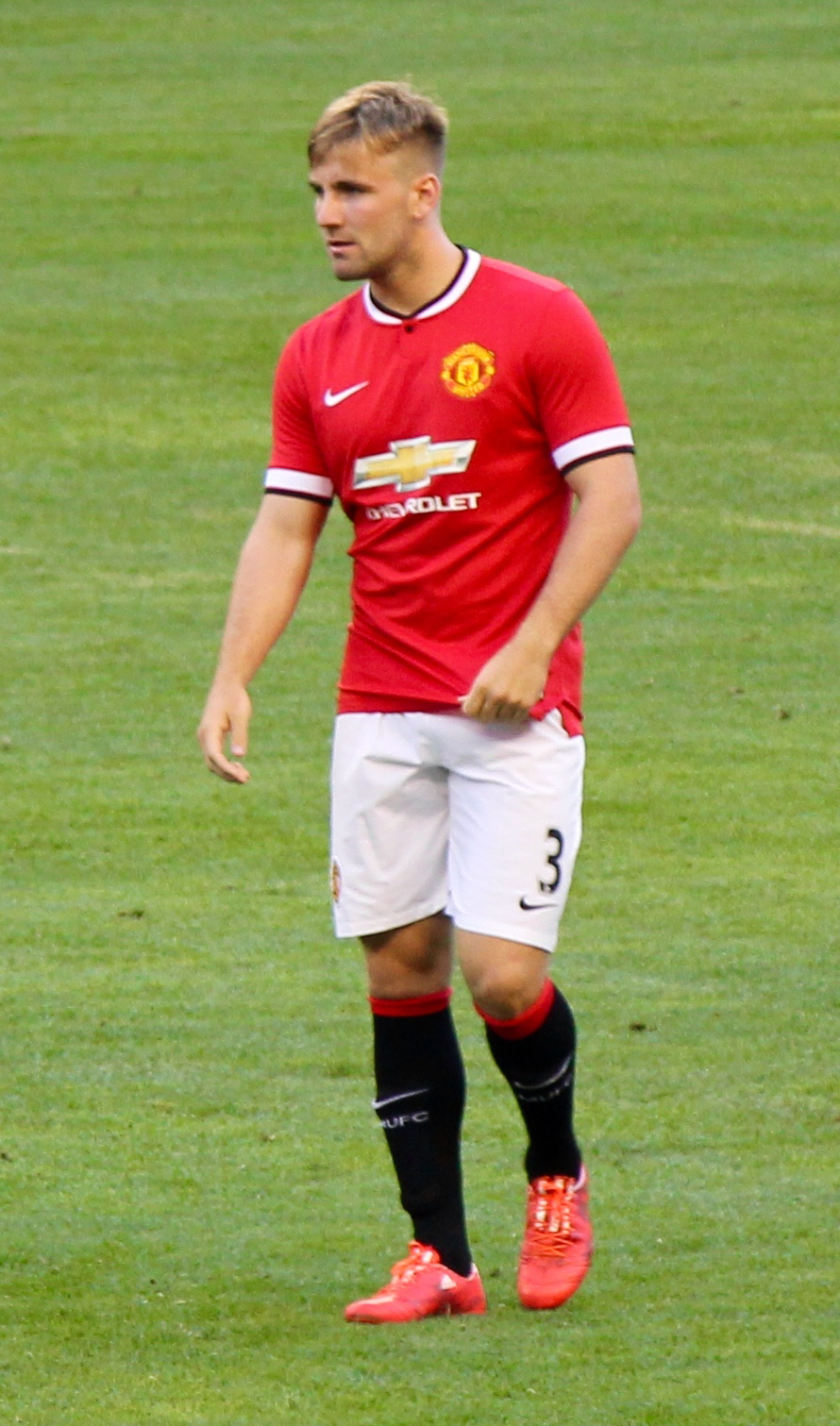
Shaw playing for Manchester United in 2015

On 27 June 2014, Shaw signed a four-year contract (with an option to extend for a further year) with Manchester United for an undisclosed fee thought to be in the region of £30 million, becoming the most expensive teenager in world football. Chelsea were also interested in Shaw, but they backed away from a deal fearing the teenager's excessive pay demands would cause friction in their dressing room.

Before the start of the season, Shaw suffered a hamstring injury that ruled him out for a month. He was named as a substitute for Manchester United for the first time on 14 September in their fourth league match, and was unused as they recorded their first victory of the season against Queens Park Rangers. After again being an unused substitute in the subsequent defeat to Leicester City, Shaw made his competitive debut for United on 27 September 2014, playing the entirety of a 2–1 home victory against West Ham United.

In October 2014, Shaw was named on the 40-man shortlist for the 2014 Golden Boy award, a prize given to the player considered to be the best European-based player under the age of 21. On 8 February 2015, Shaw was sent off after receiving a second yellow card during a 1–1 draw with West Ham. On 18 April, Shaw made his return to the starting line-up, replacing the injured Daley Blind. His first match since 9 March 2015 ended in a 1–0 defeat to league leaders Chelsea, but Shaw put up a solid performance and was praised by captain Wayne Rooney.

Shaw started every league match in the early part of the 2015–16 season until 15 September 2015, when, during the opening match of the UEFA Champions League group stage against PSV, Shaw was caught by Héctor Moreno with a sliding tackle and suffered a double leg fracture. Shaw was given oxygen and treated by nine medical staff during the nine-minute stoppage in Eindhoven before he was taken off on a stretcher and taken to hospital. Shaw was out of action for six months, before returning to training on 4 April 2016.

==== 2016–2020 ====
On 7 August 2016, Shaw made his first competitive appearance since suffering his double leg fracture in September 2015, as Manchester United won 2–1 against Leicester City to win the 2016 FA Community Shield.

On 10 August 2018, Shaw scored his first senior goal in the league opener against Leicester City as Manchester United won 2–1. Shaw also won the season's first Player of the Month award in August and again in September. He signed a new five-year contract with United on 18 October 2018. On 2 April, Shaw was announced as United's Player of the Month for March – achieving three in total during the season. At the end of the season, Shaw was voted Manchester United Players' Player of the Year and Sir Matt Busby Player of the Year.

On 5 March 2020, Shaw scored his only goal of the season in a 3–0 FA Cup win at Derby County.

==== 2021–present ====
On 2 February 2021, Shaw made two assists before he was substituted at half-time in Manchester United's Premier League record-equalling 9–0 home win against Southampton. On 7 March, Shaw scored his first league goal since August 2018 in the derby win against Manchester City.

On 20 December 2022, Shaw's contract was extended by a further year. In January 2023, Shaw played in an unfamiliar centre-back role, receiving praise from multiple pundits. He assisted the opener and played the full 90 minutes for Manchester United as they defeated Newcastle United 2–0 in the 2023 EFL Cup final. On 4 April, Manchester United announced Shaw had signed a new four-year contract that would keep him at the club until June 2027.

Having missed much of the 2023–24 and 2024–25 seasons due to injury problems, Shaw made his first start in 434 days in a 1–1 draw against AFC Bournemouth on 27 April 2025, playing the entire match. He contributed to the equalising goal.

In the 2025–26 season, he became a regular member of Ruben Amorim’s back three and started the first ten Premier League games of the season, receiving particular plaudits for his performance in the 2–2 away draw against Nottingham Forest, which led to suggestions of him returning to the England team. On 17 May 2026, he scored within five minutes in a 3–2 victory over Nottingham Forest, marking his first goal for the club in more than three years.

At the end of the season, he had accumulated 38 appearances in the Premier League, which meant Shaw had not missed a single league game for the first time in his career.

== International career ==
=== Youth career ===
Shaw's first experience of international football came in 2011, when he made six appearances for the England under-16 team. He made his debut against Slovenia in February, before competing in the Montaigu Tournament in April and scoring his first international goal against Uruguay at the tournament. He later made his debut for the under-17 team in August against Italy, and played in eight matches in a seven-month stint with the national team.

In January 2013, Shaw was set to be called up for the first time to the England under-21 team for the following month's friendly against Sweden, with then-manager Stuart Pearce calling the Southampton defender "an outstanding talent". However, due to an injury picked up in training, he was later forced to pull out of the match. The uncapped defender was subsequently called up for matches against Romania on 21 March, Austria on 25 March, and Scotland on 13 August, as well as the 2013 UEFA European Under-21 Championship, all of which he had to pull out of for the same reason. He eventually made his England under-21 debut on 5 September when the team faced Moldova in a 2015 UEFA European Under-21 Championship qualification match, and he also played the full 90 minutes of England's second qualification match against Finland on 9 September.

=== Senior career ===
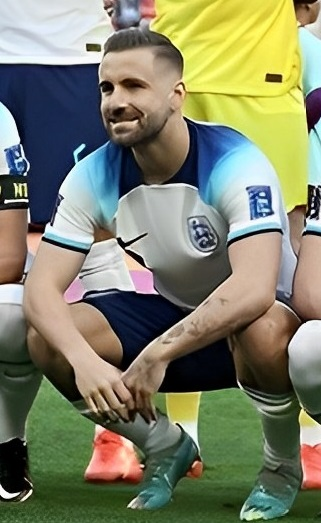
Shaw with England at the 2022 FIFA World Cup

On 27 February 2014, Shaw was called up to the England senior team for the first time, for their friendly with Denmark. He made his debut in the match, replacing Ashley Cole at half-time. England won the match 1–0. On 12 May 2014, Shaw was named in Roy Hodgson's 23-man squad for the 2014 FIFA World Cup. He was included at the expense of the experienced Cole, who retired from internationals as a result. He was England's second-choice left-back behind Leighton Baines, and made his tournament debut in the last group match, a 0–0 draw with Costa Rica in Belo Horizonte. He also holds the accolade of being the youngest player to appear at the 2014 tournament.

Shaw missed UEFA Euro 2016 with a broken leg and was not selected for the 2018 FIFA World Cup. He returned to the team for their opening match of the 2018–19 UEFA Nations League against Spain, making his first start for England since the UEFA Euro 2016 qualifier against Switzerland in August 2015. He assisted Marcus Rashford's opening goal in the 11th minute but was later substituted with a head injury and did not appear again for England until the 2022 FIFA World Cup qualifier against Albania in March 2021.

Shaw was included in the England squad for UEFA Euro 2020. On 11 July 2021, Shaw scored the fastest goal in a European Championship final, against Italy in the UEFA Euro 2020 final, with just two minutes on the clock. His early goal was not enough to give England their first major title in 55 years, as Italy emerged victorious in a penalty shoot-out after a 1–1 draw in extra time.

Shaw was included in the 26-man England squad for the 2022 FIFA World Cup. He started all five of England's matches at left-back and assisted Jude Bellingham's opening goal in a 6–2 win over Iran.

On 6 June 2024, Shaw was named in England's 26-man squad for UEFA Euro 2024 with manager Gareth Southgate calling his inclusion a "gamble" due to the player's lack of match fitness after missing the end of the 2023–24 season with an injury. Shaw made his first appearance of the tournament in England's quarter-final against Switzerland, coming on as a substitute for Ezri Konsa in the 78th minute of the match.

== Style of play ==
Prior to his injuries, ESPN described Shaw as having become one of the best left-backs in the world, citing his "defensive positioning and reading of the game." As a left-back with a tendency to play attacking football, Shaw has been compared to former Southampton youth product Gareth Bale, with particular focus being placed on his speed, decision-making and defending skills. Former England international and FA Director of Football Development Trevor Brooking has described Shaw as "technically very gifted". He received favourable comparisons to and praise from former Brazil left-back Roberto Carlos during England's run to the UEFA Euro 2020 final.

== Career statistics ==
=== Club ===
As of match played 10 October 2026

Appearances and goals by club, season and competition
Club	Season	League			FA Cup		League Cup		Europe		Other		Total	
Club	Season	Division	Apps	Goals	Apps	Goals	Apps	Goals	Apps	Goals	Apps	Goals	Apps	Goals
Southampton	2011–12	Championship	0	0	1	0	0	0	—		—		1	0
Southampton	2012–13	Premier League	25	0	1	0	2	0	—		—		28	0
Southampton	2013–14	Premier League	35	0	3	0	0	0	—		—		38	0
Southampton	Total		60	0	5	0	2	0	—		—		67	0
Manchester United	2014–15	Premier League	16	0	4	0	0	0	—		—		20	0
Manchester United	2015–16	Premier League	5	0	0	0	0	0	3 (Note: Appearance(s) in UEFA Champions League)	0	—		8	0
Manchester United	2016–17	Premier League	11	0	1	0	2	0	4 (Note: Appearances in UEFA Europa League)	0	1 (Note: Appearance in FA Community Shield)	0	19	0
Manchester United	2017–18	Premier League	11	0	4	0	3	0	1	0	0	0	19	0
Manchester United	2018–19	Premier League	29	1	3	0	0	0	8	0	—		40	1
Manchester United	2019–20	Premier League	24	0	3	1	2	0	4	0	—		33	1
Manchester United	2020–21	Premier League	32	1	3	0	2	0	10 (Note: Four appearances in UEFA Champions League, six appearances in UEFA Europa League)	0	—		47	1
Manchester United	2021–22	Premier League	20	0	2	0	0	0	5	0	—		27	0
Manchester United	2022–23	Premier League	31	1	4	0	3	0	9	0	—		47	1
Manchester United	2023–24	Premier League	12	0	1	0	0	0	2	0	—		15	0
Manchester United	2024–25	Premier League	7	0	0	0	0	0	5	0	0	0	12	0
Manchester United	2025–26	Premier League	38	1	0	0	0	0	—		—		38	1
Manchester United	2026–27	Premier League	5	0	0	0	0	0	0	0	—		5	0
Manchester United	Total		241	4	25	1	12	0	51	0	1	0	330	5
Career total			301	4	30	1	14	0	51	0	1	0	397	5

=== International ===
As of match played 14 July 2024

Appearances and goals by national team and year
National team	Year	Apps	Goals
England	2014	4	0
England	2015	2	0
England	2016	0	0
England	2017	1	0
England	2018	1	0
England	2019	0	0
England	2020	0	0
England	2021	11	1
England	2022	9	2
England	2023	3	0
England	2024	3	0
Total		34	3

As of match played 14 July 2024
England score listed first, score column indicates score after each Shaw goal

List of international goals scored by Luke Shaw
No.	Date	Venue	Cap	Opponent	Score	Result	Competition	Ref.
1	11 July 2021	Wembley Stadium, London, England	16	Italy	1–0	1–1 (a.e.t.) (2–3 p)	UEFA Euro 2020	
2	26 March 2022	Wembley Stadium, London, England	20	Switzerland	1–1	2–1	Friendly	
3	26 September 2022	Wembley Stadium, London, England	23	Germany	1–2	3–3	2022–23 UEFA Nations League A	

== Honours ==
Manchester United

- EFL Cup: 2022–23
- FA Community Shield: 2016
- UEFA Europa League: 2016–17; runner-up: 2020–21, 2024–25
- FA Cup runner-up: 2022–23

England

- UEFA European Championship runner-up: 2020, 2024

Individual

- PFA Team of the Year: 2013–14 Premier League, 2020–21 Premier League
- Sir Matt Busby Player of the Year: 2018–19
- Manchester United Players' Player of the Year: 2018–19, 2020–21
