= David de Gea =

Spanish footballer (born 1990)

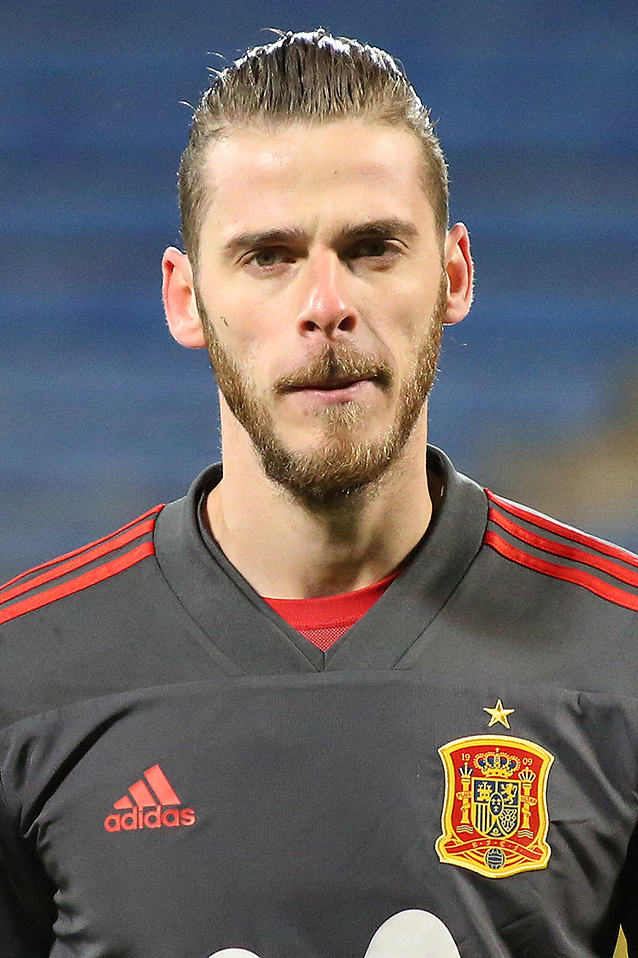
- De Gea with Spain in 2017

Personal information
- Full name: David de Gea Quintana
- Date of birth: 7 November 1990 (age 36)
- Place of birth: Madrid, Spain
- Height: 1.92 m (6 ft 4 in)
- Position: Goalkeeper

Team information
- Current team: Fiorentina
- Number: 43

Youth career
- 2003–2008: Atlético Madrid

Senior career*
Years	Team	Apps	(Gls)
2008–2009	Atlético Madrid B	35	(0)
2009–2011	Atlético Madrid	57	(0)
2011–2023	Manchester United	415	(0)
2024–	Fiorentina	83	(0)

International career
2004	Spain U15	12	(0)
2007	Spain U17	15	(0)
2007–2009	Spain U19	15	(0)
2009	Spain U20	1	(0)
2009–2013	Spain U21	27	(0)
2012	Spain U23	5	(0)
2014–2020	Spain	45	(0)
Medal record
Men's football
Representing Spain
UEFA Nations League
Runner-up	2021 Italy
UEFA European Championship
Bronze medal – third place	2020 Europe
UEFA European Under-21 Championship
Winner	2013 Israel
Winner	2011 Denmark
FIFA U-17 World Cup
Runner-up	2007 South Korea
UEFA European Under-17 Championship
Winner	2007 Belgium
- * Club domestic league appearances and goals as of 23:57, 8 November 2026 (UTC)

David de Gea Quintana (Spanish pronunciation: [daˈβið ðe ˈxea kinˈtana]; born 7 November 1990) is a Spanish professional footballer who plays as a goalkeeper for and captains Serie A club Fiorentina. He is regarded as one of the best goalkeepers of his generation.

Born in Madrid, De Gea began his playing career with Atlético Madrid, rising through the academy system at the club before making his senior debut in 2009, aged 18. After being made Atlético's first-choice goalkeeper, he helped the team win the UEFA Europa League and the UEFA Super Cup in 2010. His performances subsequently attracted the attention of Manchester United, and De Gea joined the club in 2011 for £18.9 million, a British record for a goalkeeper at the time.

During his time at United, De Gea made over 500 appearances and won a Premier League title, an FA Cup, two League Cups, three Community Shields and a second Europa League. For three consecutive seasons from 2013–14 to 2015–16, he was elected as United's Sir Matt Busby Player of the Year, the first player in the award's history to win on three successive occasions (four in total), as well as being included in four consecutive (five in total) PFA Team of the Year sides from 2015 to 2018. In 2018, he was named in the FIFA FIFPro World11. De Gea left United following the expiration of his contract in 2023, and, following a year away from football, joined Fiorentina.

Tipped by many as the successor to Iker Casillas as Spain's long-term goalkeeper, De Gea was the captain for the Spain under-21 national team that won the European Championship in 2011 and 2013, and also competed in the 2012 Summer Olympics. He made his debut for the senior team in 2014 and was selected for that year's World Cup. De Gea was named as Spain's starting goalkeeper for UEFA Euro 2016 and the 2018 FIFA World Cup, receiving criticism for his performance in the latter. He lost his regular place to Unai Simón for Euro 2020.

== Club career ==
=== Atlético Madrid ===
==== Youth and Atlético B ====
Born in Madrid and raised in Illescas, De Gea joined Atlético Madrid at the age of 13 when his then coach Juan Luis Martín lied to the club that Rayo Vallecano were set to sign him. A few days later, Diego Díaz scouted De Gea and signed him immediately. He made his way up through the youth ranks at the club before signing his first professional contract in 2008, aged 17, contracting him to Atlético until 2011. He spent his second season for Atlético Madrid B in Segunda División B. In the summer of 2009, De Gea was approached by Numancia and English team Queens Park Rangers with regards to a loan move, with Atlético sporting director Jesús García Pitarch pushing for him to move to Numancia. De Gea rejected the approach, and was punished by being forced to train by himself. Weeks later, Atlético manager Abel Resino noticed De Gea training alone and invited him to train with the first team, where he was rated as the third-choice goalkeeper. The same summer, Atlético rejected an offer from English team Wigan Athletic for a permanent transfer for De Gea.

==== 2009–10 season: First-team call-up ====
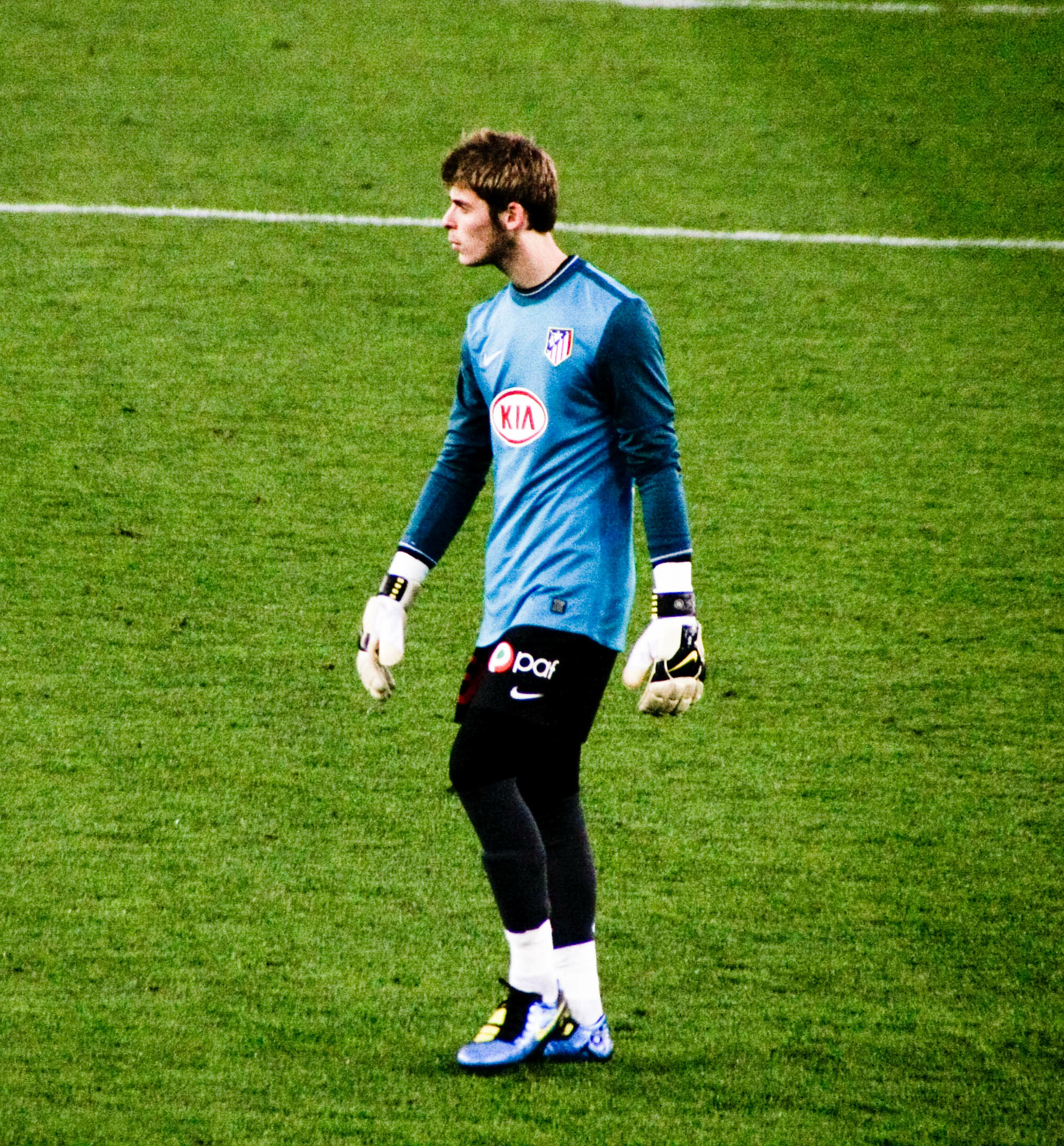
De Gea playing for Atlético Madrid in 2010

With first-choice goalkeeper Sergio Asenjo away on international duty at the 2009 FIFA U-20 World Cup, De Gea was called up to the senior team as cover for Roberto. He made his debut for the Atlético first-team at the age of 18 on 30 September 2009, coming on as a substitute after Roberto was injured after 27 minutes of Atlético's UEFA Champions League group stage match away to Porto; De Gea conceded two late goals as Atlético lost 2–0. Roberto's injury meant that De Gea was given his La Liga debut three days later, at home to Real Zaragoza; he gave away a penalty kick in the 19th minute, but immediately redeemed himself by saving Marko Babić's attempt in a 2–1 win. He described starting at the Vicente Calderón Stadium as a "dream since childhood". In January 2010, De Gea was touted as a possible replacement for Manchester United goalkeeper Edwin van der Sar, who was set to retire in 2011. Days later, however, he signed a new contract which would keep him with Atlético until 2013.

After some costly mistakes by Asenjo, and the arrival of Quique Sánchez Flores as manager, De Gea finished the 2009–10 season as the starting goalkeeper . He won two man of the match awards along the way, against Athletic Bilbao and Valencia. Additionally, he appeared in eight matches in the club's victorious UEFA Europa League campaign, including the 2–1 final win against Fulham. Diego Forlán later said of his first season, "David was good enough for the top level at 19 and the players had confidence in him."

==== 2010–11 season ====
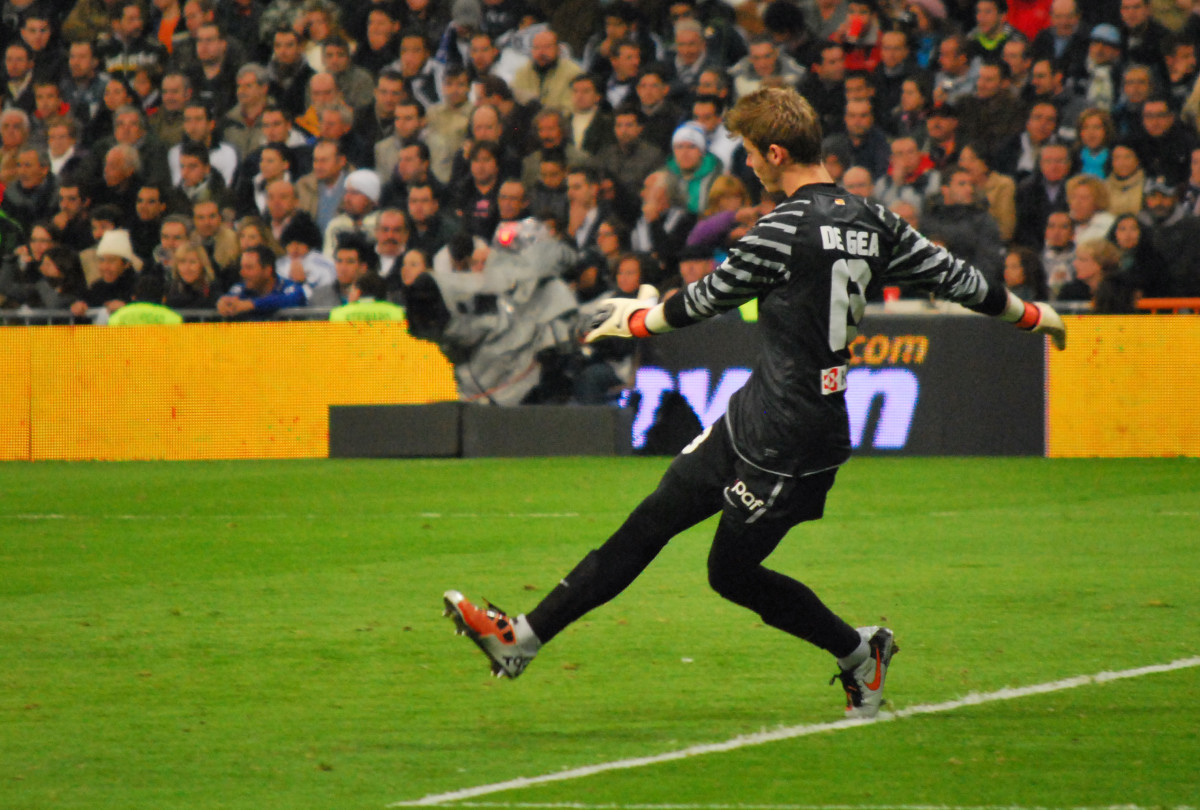
De Gea during the Madrid Derby in November 2010

This boy is as cold as a wolf. He has composure, nerve and self-confidence. The pressures that others might feel don't affect him.

— Atlético youth goalkeeping coach Ángel Mejías in 2010.

De Gea began the 2010–11 season by keeping a clean sheet in a 2–0 victory over Inter Milan in the 2010 UEFA Super Cup; in the 90th minute, he saved a Diego Milito penalty kick. In September, it was reported that Manchester United manager Sir Alex Ferguson had missed a League Cup match with Scunthorpe United to travel to Spain to watch De Gea in action against Valencia. De Gea played down the rumours, saying, "The important thing is that I have a contract here and I'm an Atletico player until 2013."

Following his "faultless" performance in the Madrid Derby on 7 November, De Gea was hailed as the heir apparent to Real Madrid's goalkeeper Iker Casillas for Spain, a sentiment Casillas agreed with, saying, "In Spain we are lucky to have very good goalkeepers and De Gea soon might be fighting my place in the team," while Spain manager Vicente del Bosque described De Gea as "the future of the team". He remained the undisputed starting goalkeeper for the remainder of the season, going on to play in every La Liga match for the team en route to a seventh-place finish.

=== Manchester United ===
==== Transfer ====
Throughout the 2010–11 season, speculation regarding how Manchester United would replace their retiring goalkeeper Edwin van der Sar was widespread, and much attention focused on De Gea as United's key target. After Gary Neville's testimonial against Juventus on 24 May, United manager Sir Alex Ferguson claimed that a deal had been done to bring De Gea to Old Trafford, but this was later denied by the player's representatives and the Atlético management, with De Gea stating that he would not consider his future until after the 2011 UEFA European Under-21 Championship. Following Spain's victory in the tournament, De Gea was spotted in Manchester undergoing a medical with United on 27 June. The next day, he reported that United were making him a contract offer, and the transfer was confirmed on 29 June for a then-British record fee for a goalkeeper of approximately £18.9 million.

Growing up, De Gea had admired United goalkeeper Peter Schmeichel, and was often compared to Van der Sar, furthered by being dubbed "Van der Gea".

==== 2011–12 season ====
De Gea is high, has good feet, comes with authority and is agile... has everything to be one of the greatest goalkeepers in the next ten years.

— Edwin van der Sar, former Manchester United goalkeeper.

De Gea made his first appearance for Manchester United in a 3–1 friendly win over Chicago Fire on 23 July 2011. He made his competitive debut for United against Manchester City in the Community Shield on 7 August. Despite being caught out in the first-half by a header from Joleon Lescott and a long-range Edin Džeko strike that put City into a 2–0 lead, United rallied in the second half and won 3–2. De Gea made his league debut for Manchester United against West Bromwich Albion a week later, where he received criticism for failing to save Shane Long's goal during a 2–1 United victory, which Ferguson described as "a learning process". De Gea kept his first clean sheet for United on his Old Trafford debut in the following fixture, a 3–0 victory against Tottenham Hotspur. In the following match, six days later, De Gea saved a penalty from Arsenal captain Robin van Persie, which would have cancelled out United's 1–0 lead. He made further saves to deny Van Persie and Andrey Arshavin in United's 8–2 victory. Teammate Wayne Rooney backed De Gea to succeed at United and hailed him as a "strong character".

On 18 September, Manchester United beat Chelsea 3–1 at Old Trafford, with De Gea making a string of saves, particularly from Ramires – when the midfielder had an empty net to side-foot home, De Gea quickly got across to smother the ball away. De Gea's improvement in form continued in his next appearance, as he made two notable saves to help his team to a 1–1 draw away at Stoke City, and his overall performance was praised by teammates Patrice Evra and Darren Fletcher. De Gea made his first ever UEFA Champions League start in a 3–3 draw against Basel on 27 September 2011. On 15 October, De Gea was praised for his efforts at Anfield as United drew 1–1 against Liverpool, providing important saves in a nerve-free performance, prompting Liverpool manager Kenny Dalglish to joke, "I thought the press said the boy was struggling."

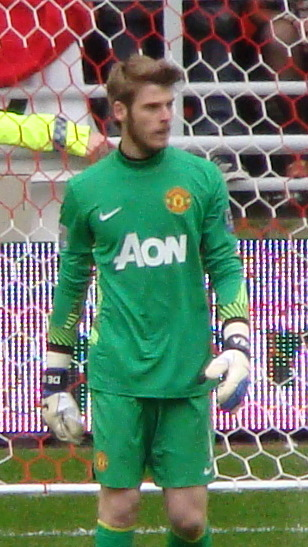
De Gea playing for Manchester United in 2012

On 23 October 2011, De Gea played as Manchester United suffered their worst home defeat since 1955 with a 6–1 loss against cross-town rivals Manchester City, the first time United had conceded six goals at home since 1930. De Gea was in goal during the league defeat to Blackburn Rovers and was blamed by most media outlets for failing to deal with an aerial ball that led to the conceding of a late goal by Grant Hanley in a 3–2 defeat. De Gea was nonplussed by the error, saying, "all keepers make mistakes once in a while and none of us like it when we do. I have every intention of spending many years here at Manchester United. I want to become a great United keeper and I want to earn and deserve the respect I hope to get," and spoke of his intentions of surpassing his predecessor: "Hopefully, I will equal or even surpass the performance and contribution Edwin van der Sar made to the club." After this match, De Gea was dropped and replaced by United's second-choice goalkeeper, Anders Lindegaard. An injury to Lindegaard saw De Gea return to the starting line-up for a 3–3 draw with Chelsea at Stamford Bridge on 5 February 2012. De Gea later cited his last-minute save from Juan Mata during this match as the turning point in his season, as he went on to play the club's last 19 matches, keeping eight clean sheets.

After a difficult first season in England, De Gea said, "There have been doubts in the first season but I always had faith in my ability. The pressure at an elite club like United is huge but Ferguson just told me to do what I did at Atlético. You have to be as strong when things go wrong but I don't get nervous. Mistakes are normal; everyone makes them." His goalkeeping rival Lindegaard, however, promised to fight for the place he lost via injury, saying, "I want the number one spot because I am the best. I am sure he is a bit in front right now because he did well last season, so I need to take every chance I get to prove myself worthy of the number one spot." De Gea later admitted that he thought about leaving after the first season.

==== 2012–13 season ====
Due to his involvement in the 2012 Olympics, De Gea missed Manchester United's pre-season tour, but nevertheless returned to the starting line-up for the opening match of the season against Everton. Despite some "outstanding" saves from De Gea, United lost 1–0. In the next match, a 3–2 win at home to Fulham, he made some noteworthy saves from Mladen Petrić, Mousa Dembélé and Bryan Ruiz. However, in attempting to claim a cross from Matthew Briggs, a misunderstanding with Nemanja Vidić led to the Serbian defender putting the ball in his own net for Fulham's second goal.

I've no doubts that David De Gea can be a top goalkeeper, one of the best in the world. He's physically going to mature in the next 18 months and he needs a championship.

— Gary Neville in 2013.

On 9 December, De Gea made back-to-back saves from Manchester City's Carlos Tevez and David Silva, helping United to a 3–2 Manchester Derby win at the City of Manchester Stadium. In the next match, a 3–1 win against Sunderland at Old Trafford, De Gea produced an important double-save from Craig Gardner and Stéphane Sessègnon's follow-up.

De Gea received criticism from former United captain Gary Neville for a punch that allowed Tottenham to score a stoppage time equaliser in a 1–1 draw at White Hart Lane on 20 January 2013, saying, "You've got to learn the hard way and he's learning in a very unforgiving environment where he's judged continuously at the highest level. There's a theory that he saved Manchester United because he made two or three great saves, but unfortunately that's a waste of time. He played well yesterday, but playing well for 92-and-a-half minutes and then doing that in the 93rd is a problem at a club like that." Ferguson responded by saying De Gea's critics were "idiots". On 13 February 2013, De Gea made several saves to help United to a 1–1 draw against Real Madrid at the Santiago Bernabéu Stadium in the first leg of the last 16 of the Champions League, and was praised by manager Sir Alex Ferguson for his "excellent" performance, one which was said to have turned him from "villain to hero" and made him "come of age".

You bring a boy into the Premier League at 20, it's not easy. He's learning in the toughest environment in the world. But the one thing he has is fantastic inner strength. We teach him that the calmest man on the field has to be the goalkeeper. And one of his great strengths is his calmness.

— goalkeeping coach Eric Steele in 2013.

On 23 February, De Gea recorded his second consecutive clean sheet for United, stopping a Loïc Rémy shot and a Christopher Samba header to help United to a 2–0 victory over Queens Park Rangers. This was followed by a 4–0 win at Old Trafford against Norwich City on 2 March. Another clean sheet came on 16 March in a 1–0 victory against Reading. De Gea was on the receiving end of a controversial aerial challenge by West Ham United striker Andy Carroll that left him "poleaxed", with Ferguson expressing his disbelief at the lack of a red card.

De Gea's form throughout the season was recognised by his peers, culminating in being voted into the PFA Premier League Team of the Year. He ended the season with his first Premier League winner's medal with United, making 28 appearances and keeping 11 clean sheets, as the team topped the Premier League table by 11 points. This placed him joint-fifth in the race for the Premier League Golden Glove.

==== 2013–14 season ====
He has huge faith in himself, which is a really important virtue. He doesn't let anything affect him. The day he makes a mistake he knows he has made a mistake but it never sinks him. He uses it to make sure that he doesn't make the mistake next time. It's a great quality.

— Juan Mata in 2014.

De Gea's season began with a clean sheet in the 2–0 win over Wigan in the Community Shield at Wembley Stadium. On 5 October 2013, De Gea's save to deny Sunderland's Emanuele Giaccherini during a 2–1 away win was described by former Manchester United goalkeeper Peter Schmeichel as one of the best saves ever seen in the Premier League. Manager David Moyes agreed with Schmeichel's assessment, describing the save was a "turning point" in a match in which they were losing 1–0 at the time, and said De Gea "is improving all the time".

On 1 December, De Gea made his 100th appearance for Manchester United in a 2–2 draw against Tottenham. He received the backing of teammate Darren Fletcher, when, in the League Cup semi-final second leg against Sunderland on 22 January 2014, De Gea was deemed to be at fault when he let a weak Phil Bardsley shot past him deep into extra time; a Javier Hernández goal soon after left the aggregate score at 3–3, resulting in a penalty shoot-out, where De Gea's penalty saves from Steven Fletcher and Adam Johnson were not enough to help United advance, losing 2–1. On 19 March, whilst playing against Olympiacos in the first knockout stage of the Champions League as United came from 2–0 down to win 3–2 on aggregate, De Gea made a crucial double-save before half-time which was said to have defied "all known laws of physics and physiology" in a performance described as "magnificent". Teammate Phil Jones claimed that "he's up there with the best goalkeepers in the world". De Gea's performances throughout the season saw him named as both the club's Players' Player of the Year and Fans' Player of the Year.

==== 2014–15 season ====
We are now seeing a huge improvement in his game. And he is winning United match after match, which is what I expect from a United goalkeeper. He has now become a great goalkeeper.

— Gary Neville in 2014.

De Gea helped United secure back-to-back victories for the first time under their new manager Louis van Gaal in a home victory against Everton on 5 October 2014. During the match, De Gea made three important saves, including one penalty from Leighton Baines, to help United secure a 2–1 win in which he was voted by Manchester United fans as man of the match. He became the first goalkeeper to stop a penalty from Baines, who had previously converted all of his 14 Premier League penalties. After several vital stops against Everton, West Brom and Chelsea, he was named Manchester United's Player of the Month for October. On 14 December, De Gea was awarded the man of the match for his "outstanding" performance against Liverpool, making eight saves in a 3–0 victory, a performance rated as the best of the Premier League season. He was hailed by Van Gaal as "unbelievable" for his performances, and was called the "saving grace" for being the one constant in the team throughout the season. Amid rumours of a departure, he said he was "proud" to play for United, and was prompted by Peter Schmeichel and Gary Neville to sign a new contract with the club.

At the end of the season, De Gea was shortlisted for the PFA Players' Player of the Year and the PFA Young Player of the Year, before losing out to Eden Hazard and Harry Kane respectively. On 26 April 2015, De Gea was named in the PFA Team of the Year as its goalkeeper and its only Manchester United player. He also won both Fans' Player of the Year and Players' Player of the Year awards for the second consecutive season. His save against Everton was voted as Premier League Save of the Season by Match of the Day, the second consecutive year he won the award.

==== 2015–16 season ====
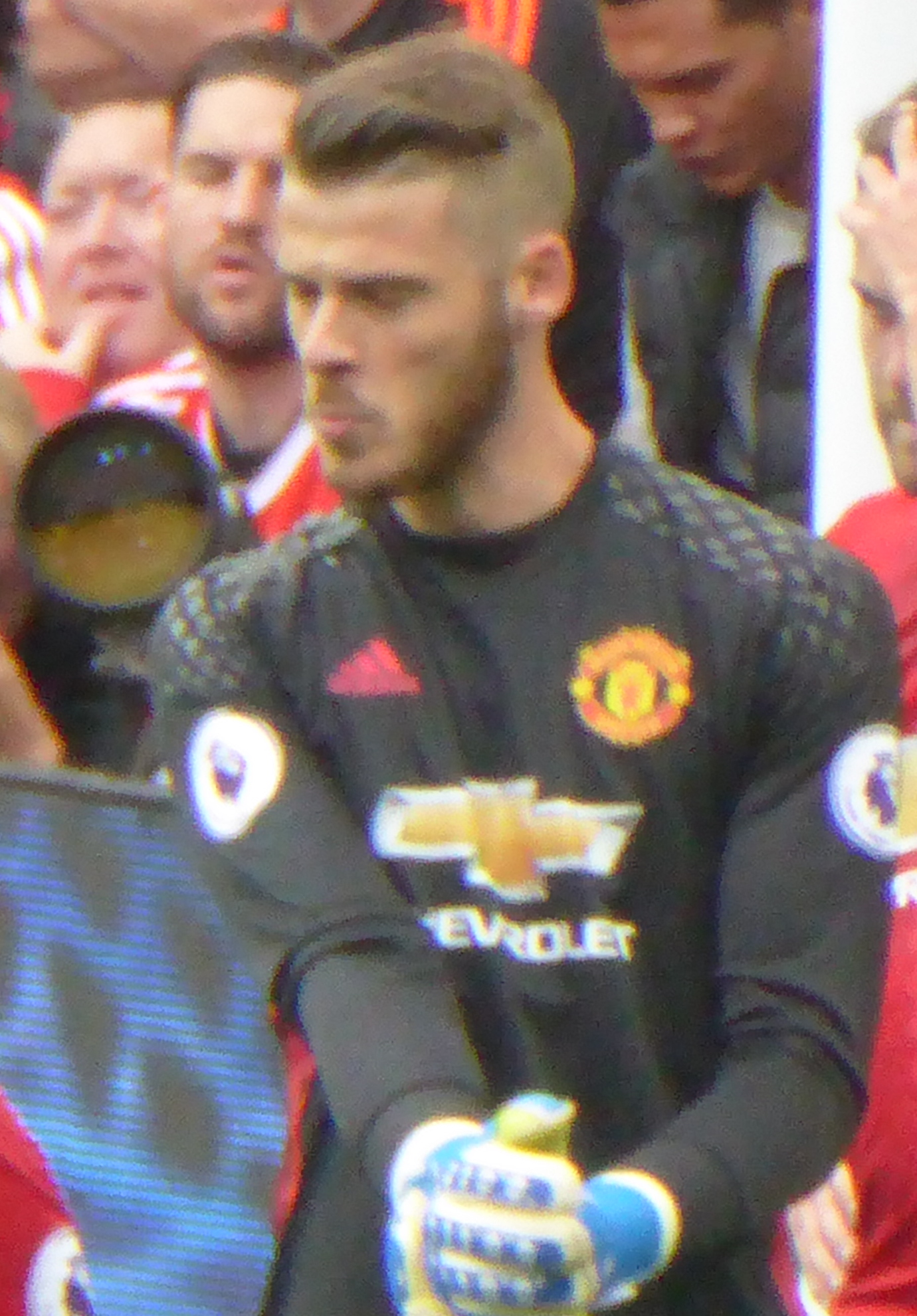
De Gea playing for Manchester United in 2016

On 7 August 2015, Manchester United manager Louis van Gaal confirmed that De Gea would not be considered for selection for United's Premier League opener against Tottenham the following day, due to the uncertainty surrounding his future. On 13 August, Van Gaal revealed that De Gea had requested to goalkeeping coach Frans Hoek that he be left out of the team. De Gea claimed he never expressed a desire not to play, but trained with the reserves soon after. On 31 August, after a summer of speculation, an agreement for a transfer was reached between Manchester United and Real Madrid worth £29 million, including the part-exchange of fellow goalkeeper Keylor Navas. The deal, however, collapsed due to paperwork not being submitted before the transfer window in Spain closed. After the transfer window closed, Spanish head coach Vicente del Bosque admitted that it would be difficult for him to select De Gea in Spain's European Championship squad if Manchester United continued not to select him.

On 11 September, De Gea signed a new four-year deal with Manchester United, with an option to extend it for a further year. Twelve days later, in the third round of the League Cup, De Gea captained Manchester United for the first time, wearing the armband for the final nine minutes of their win over Ipswich Town. In April 2016, while leading the race for the Premier League Golden Glove with 14 clean sheets, De Gea was the sole Manchester United player named in the PFA Team of the Year. On 23 April, in a 2–1 win over Everton in the FA Cup semi-finals, he saved a penalty from Romelu Lukaku.

In May 2016, De Gea became the first player ever to win Manchester United's Player of the Year for a third consecutive season. During the same month, he also won BBC Match of the Day Save of the Season for the third consecutive year, for his save against Watford on 21 November 2015. In the last league match of the season, a 3–1 win over AFC Bournemouth, De Gea was denied the chance to share the Premier League Golden Glove with Arsenal's Petr Čech due to a stoppage-time own goal by Chris Smalling.

==== 2016–17 season ====
Under new Manchester United manager José Mourinho, De Gea made his first appearance of the season in the FA Community Shield against Premier League winners Leicester City. The match ended in a 2–1 victory for United. De Gea started the Premier League season by keeping 2 clean sheets in his first 3 games against Southampton and Hull City. De Gea was part of the Manchester United team which lost 4–0 to Chelsea, their heaviest Premier League defeat since the 6–1 loss against Manchester City in October 2011. On 26 February 2017, he won his first EFL Cup title after a 3–2 victory over Southampton in the final.

On 20 April 2017, De Gea was selected as a goalkeeper in the PFA Team of the Year for the fourth time in his career. On 24 May, he won his third trophy of the season, as Manchester United beat Ajax 2–0 in the Europa League final, despite being an unused substitute to Sergio Romero in that match.

==== 2017–18 season ====
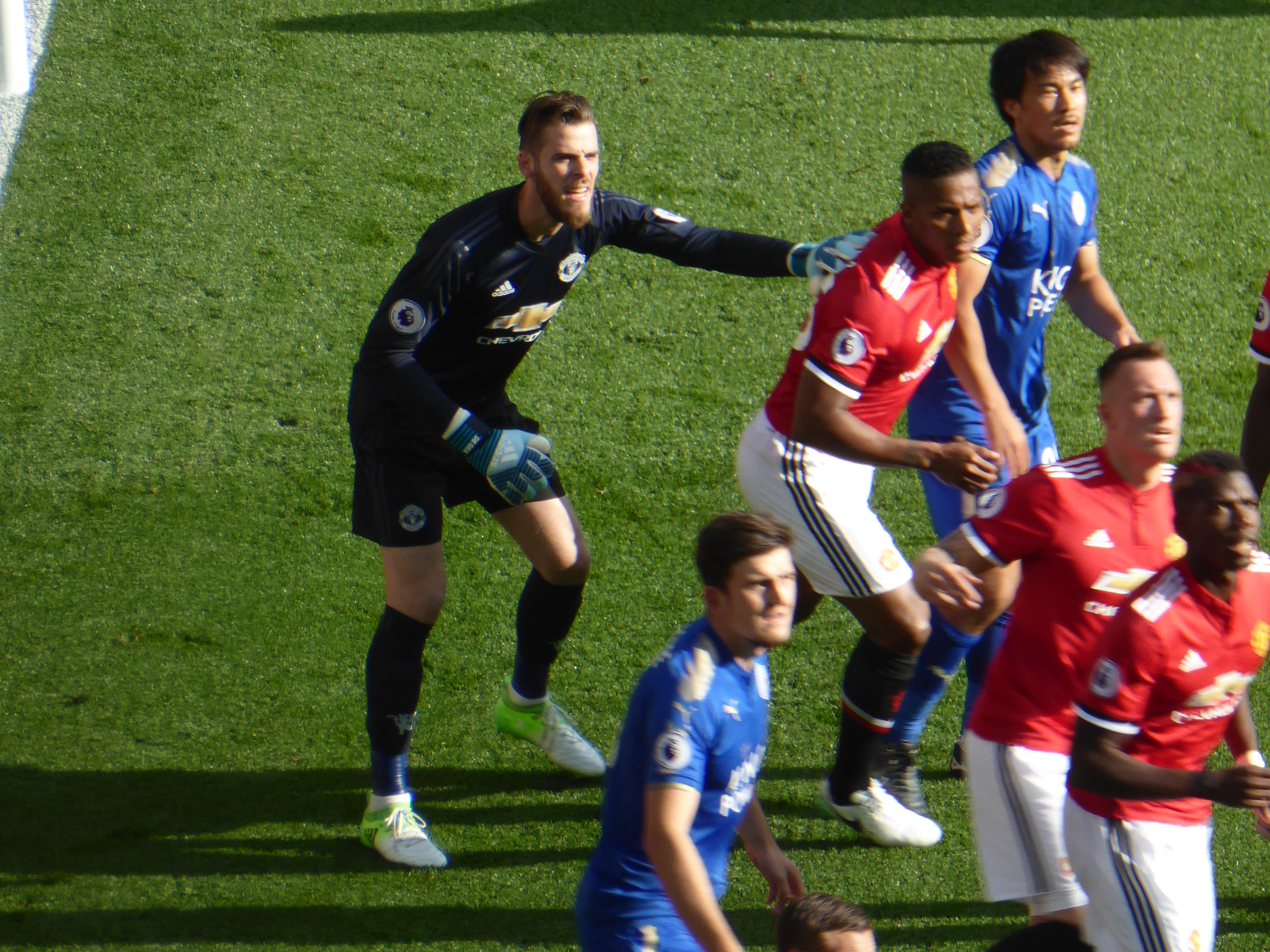
De Gea (in black) playing for Manchester United in 2017

On 17 September 2017, at the fifth match of the Premier League against Everton, De Gea made his fourth clean sheet of the season and 100th overall for Manchester United.

On 2 December 2017, in a 3–1 win over Arsenal, De Gea recorded 14 saves and equalled the mark that was shared by Tim Krul and Vito Mannone as the Premier League record for the greatest number of saves in a single game and he also won the Man of the Match award.

On 18 April 2018, De Gea was selected as a goalkeeper in the PFA Team of the Year for the fifth time as the only Manchester United player.

On 11 May 2018, after a 0–0 draw against West Ham, De Gea earned his 18th clean sheet of the season and also secured his first Premier League Golden Glove since he joined Manchester United in 2011.

==== 2018–19 season ====
The 2018–19 season began with De Gea keeping just five clean sheets in his first 25 appearances. The start of 2019, however, saw him manage the same number in just eight appearances, including a 1–0 win over Tottenham Hotspur on 13 January 2019, in which he made 11 saves to keep Spurs off the scoresheet, the second most by a goalkeeper in any one Premier League match, behind only his 14 saves against Arsenal a year earlier. His clean sheet against Liverpool on 24 February was his 100th for Manchester United in the Premier League, making him the seventh goalkeeper to reach that milestone for a single club in the competition and the second for Manchester United after Peter Schmeichel. In March and April, De Gea suffered a run of poor form; being criticised by fans and pundits for mistakes made in losses to Arsenal, Barcelona, Everton, Manchester City, and a 1–1 draw against Chelsea. De Gea ended the season with just 7 clean sheets in 38 Premier League appearances, his lowest tally during his time at Manchester United, and kept only 10 clean sheets all season for the club.

==== 2019–20 season ====
On 3 July 2019, ahead of the 2019–20 season, De Gea was offered a new contract. By 15 July 2019, the negotiations were ongoing. On 11 August 2019, De Gea started in Manchester United's opening Premier League match against Chelsea and kept his first clean sheet of the season, as United beat Chelsea 4–0. On 16 September 2019, Manchester United confirmed that De Gea had signed a four-year contract renewal, keeping him at the club until at least June 2023.

In October 2019 he became an injury doubt for the North-West derby after being injured in a game for Spain. Despite this, De Gea started the game which ended in a 1–1 draw.

In Manchester United's first game after the break in the season enforced by COVID-19 against Tottenham Hotspur, De Gea made an error leading to a goal that cost United the win. This came after a series of errors earlier in the season against Crystal Palace, Watford, and Everton. This error spell, like last season, resulted in calls from fans for Dean Henderson to be made Manchester United's first choice goalkeeper. Manager Ole Gunnar Solskjær backed De Gea saying, "one day [Henderson will] be England's and United's Number 1" but that De Gea was currently "the best goalkeeper in the world". However, de Gea continued his error-prone season in United's FA Cup Semi-final tie against Chelsea, where he was directly responsible for one of the goals in a 3–1 defeat. This came one week after reaching a number of landmarks and records for United including becoming the most capped non-British or Irish player to play for United, achieved on 9 July, and reaching 400 appearances for the club on 13 July. On 16 July 2020, he also kept his 112th PL clean sheet against Crystal Palace, equalling Peter Schmeichel's club record in the top flight. On the last day of Premier League, De Gea kept his 113th PL clean sheet against Leicester City and surpassed Schmeichel's record.

==== 2020–21 season ====
The return of Dean Henderson from an extended loan spell at Sheffield United meant De Gea went into the 2020–21 season with a true competitor for Manchester United's number 1 jersey for the first time since joining the club. De Gea began the season as first-choice, missing just two of the club's first 26 league matches: he was left out of the squad for the match against West Ham United on 5 December 2020 after aggravating an injury suffered in the club's previous league game against Southampton, while Henderson was preferred against Sheffield United on 17 December. On 2 February 2021, De Gea played the full 90 minutes and kept a clean sheet in Manchester United's Premier League record-equalling 9–0 home win against Southampton.

De Gea also started five of Manchester United's six Champions League group matches, but after the team finished third in their group and dropped down to the Europa League, Henderson was preferred in goal for the Europa League knockout phase. At the start of March 2021, De Gea returned to Spain for the birth of his first child, which meant Henderson was able to take over as first-choice goalkeeper in the league and De Gea started to be preferred in the Europa League; he kept clean sheets in the two matches against Granada in the quarter-finals, and on 6 May, he made nine saves in a 3–2 away defeat to Roma in the second leg of UEFA Europa league semi-final, as United progressed to the final with an 8–5 aggregate victory. On 26 May, in the 2021 UEFA Europa League final, De Gea missed his team's last penalty in an 11–10 penalty shoot-out defeat after the match finished 1–1 after extra time to hand Spanish side Villarreal their first ever European title.

==== 2021–22 season ====
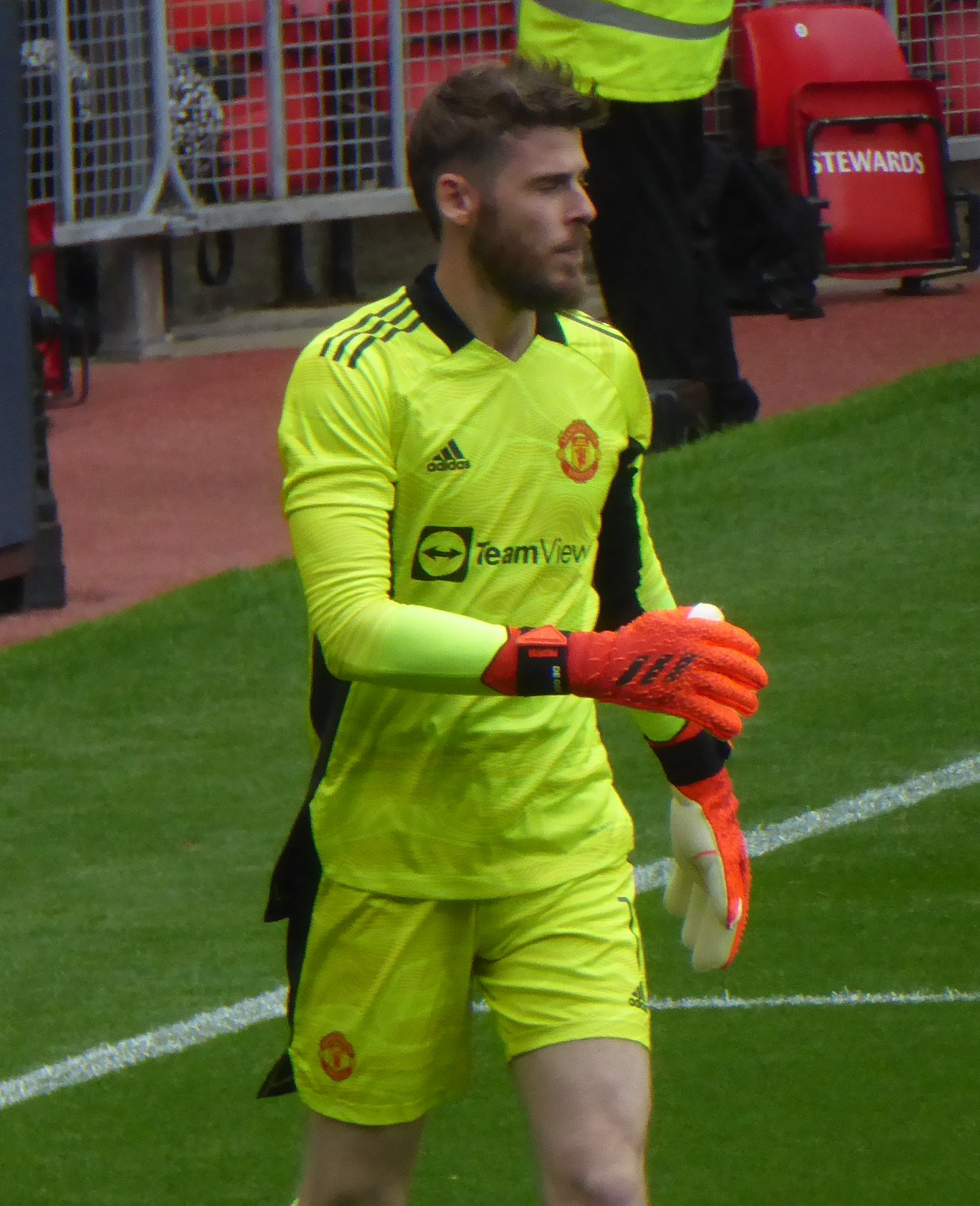
De Gea playing for Manchester United in 2021

De Gea started the league season against Leeds United, in which he conceded a goal in a 5–1 home win. He earned his first clean sheet of the season in a 1–0 win against Wolverhampton Wanderers. In the fifth gameweek of the season, De Gea saved his first penalty for Manchester United since a 2016 FA Cup tie against Everton as he denied Mark Noble of West Ham United from the spot in the last action of the game, ensuring a 2–1 victory for the Reds after a late goal from Jesse Lingard.

==== 2022–23 season ====
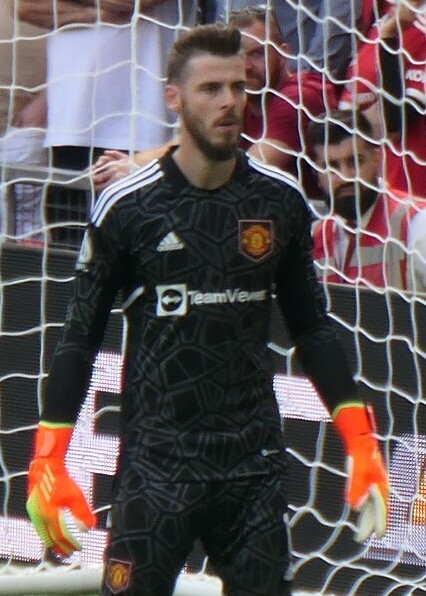
De Gea playing for Manchester United in 2022

On 16 October 2022, he played his 500th match for Manchester United in all competitions, in a goalless draw against Newcastle United. On 12 February 2023, he played his 400th Premier League match for Manchester United, with no non-British player making more for one club. On 26 February, he broke Peter Schmeichel's record for the most clean sheets in Manchester United's history, after a 2–0 win over Newcastle United in the 2023 EFL Cup final marked his 181st. On 20 May, he won the Premier League Golden Glove for the first time since the 2017–18 season. On 3 June, he played his last match for Manchester United in a 2–1 defeat against Manchester City in the FA Cup final.

De Gea's contract at Manchester United expired on 1 July 2023 as negotiations over a new contract broke down, leaving him a free agent while discussions continued. His departure from the club was confirmed on 8 July 2023. De Gea left Manchester United as their seventh all-time appearance maker, having played in 545 games in all competitions for the club. At the time of his departure, he became the last player from the Sir Alex Ferguson era to leave Manchester United. However, the club would re-sign former defender and Premier League winner Jonny Evans that same summer, meaning this was no longer the case.

=== Fiorentina ===
After spending the entirety of the 2023–24 season as a free agent, on 9 August 2024, De Gea signed for Serie A club Fiorentina. On 22 August, he made his debut for the club in a 3–3 draw against Puskás Akadémia in the 2024–25 UEFA Conference League play-off round. Later that year, on 6 October, he saved two penalty kicks, securing a 2–1 win over AC Milan. On 31 May 2025, De Gea signed a new contract with Fiorentina, keeping him at the club until 2028.

== International career ==
=== Youth ===
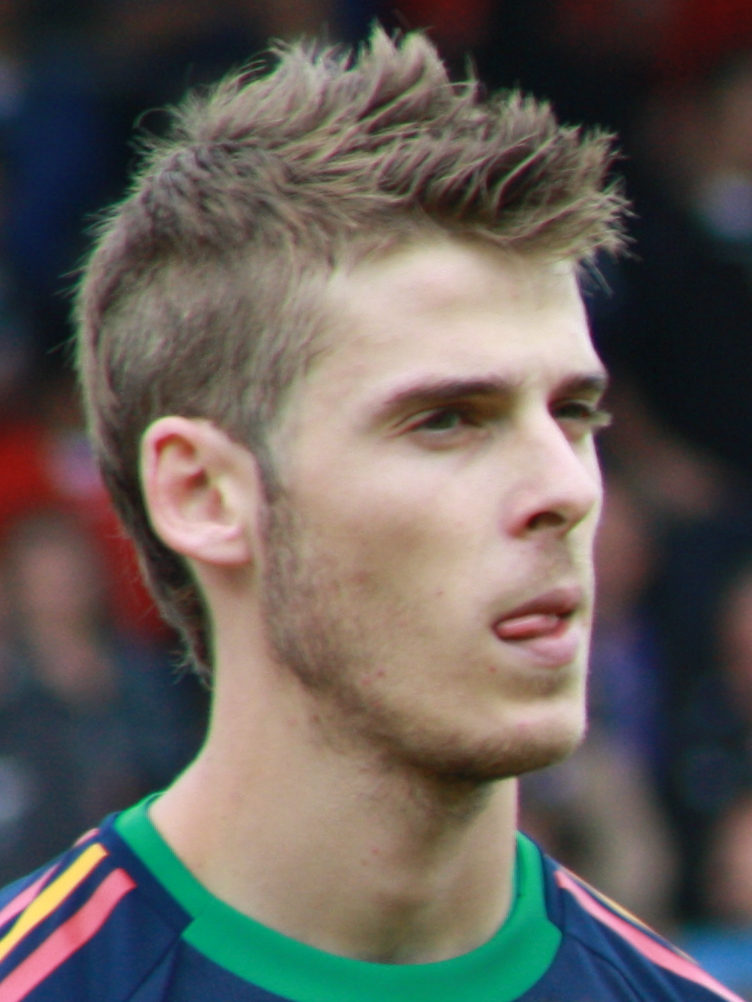
De Gea with Spain U21 in 2011

De Gea helped Spain's under-17 team win the 2007 European Championship, and finish second at the 2007 World Cup. In early May 2010, courtesy of solid Atlético performances, he was named by senior squad manager Vicente del Bosque in a provisional 30-man squad for the 2010 FIFA World Cup; however, he did not make the final cut. In 2011, he was part of the Spain under-21 team that won the 2011 UEFA European Under-21 Championship and was named in UEFA's Squad of the Tournament.

On 15 May 2012, De Gea was called up to the Spanish senior team for two matches against Serbia and China. He was in consideration for Del Bosque's Euro 2012 squad, but did not make the final 23-man group. He was selected, however, to play at the 2012 Summer Olympics, and played all three matches as the nation was eliminated in the group stage. De Gea was part of the Spain under-21 team that retained their European title in 2013 and was named in the Squad of the Tournament for the second time.

=== Senior ===
On 13 May 2014, De Gea was selected in Spain's 30-man provisional squad for the 2014 World Cup, and later made the final squad. He made his first senior international appearance against El Salvador in a 2–0 friendly victory on 8 June in preparation for the tournament, replacing Iker Casillas for the last seven minutes of the match at the FedExField in Washington D.C. As third-choice goalkeeper behind Casillas and Pepe Reina, De Gea was the only member of the squad not to feature at that World Cup, in which Spain were eliminated in the group stage.

On 4 September 2014, he made his first start for Spain, playing the whole 90 minutes against France in a friendly match and conceding a goal from Loïc Rémy to lose 1–0. He played his first competitive international on his third cap on 12 October, keeping a clean sheet in a 4–0 win away to Luxembourg in UEFA Euro 2016 qualifying.

Many tipped De Gea to succeed Casillas as the long-term number one goalkeeper, including Casillas himself. On 31 May 2016, he was named to Vicente del Bosque's final 23-man Spanish squad for UEFA Euro 2016. He started their opening match against the Czech Republic in Toulouse, keeping a clean sheet in a 1–0 victory. He followed up with another clean sheet against Turkey as Spain won 3–0. The following match, however, he conceded twice to Croatia as his team lost 2–1. Spain was eliminated in the round of 16 on 27 June, with their opponent Italy scoring the only two goals of the match.

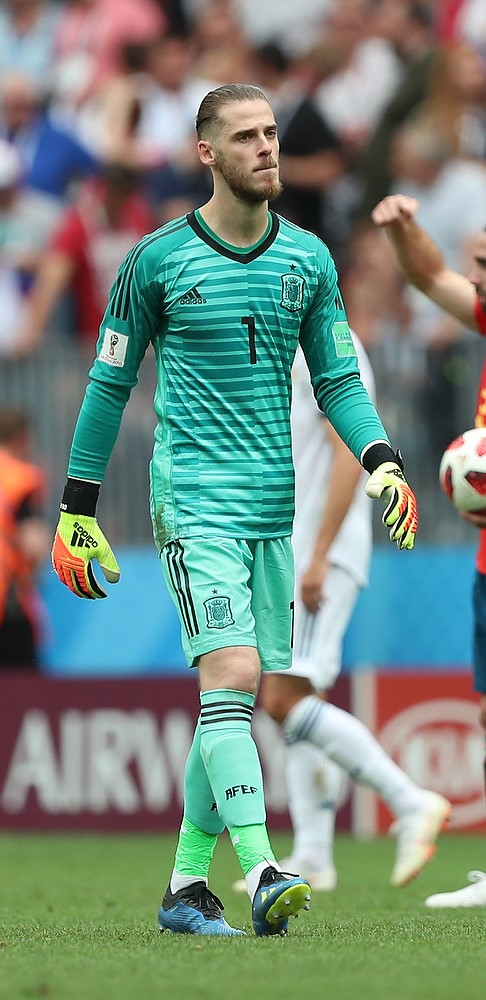
De Gea with Spain at the 2018 FIFA World Cup

On 21 May 2018, De Gea was called up to Spain's squad for the 2018 FIFA World Cup in Russia. In Spain's first game of the tournament on 15 June, he was at fault for Portugal's second goal, letting a Cristiano Ronaldo shot slip through his grasp; Ronaldo completed a hat-trick during the 3–3 draw, with his first goal coming from a penalty, and his third from a free-kick, which were Portugal's only other shots on target. In Spain's second group match against Iran on 20 June, he kept a clean-sheet in a 1–0 victory. De Gea continued to struggle in Spain's final group match against Morocco on 25 June, however, which ended in a 2–2 draw; his unsteady performances in the group stage drew criticism in the media, who noted that he had only made one save in the tournament. On 1 July, De Gea also failed to make a save during Spain's 4–3 penalty shootout loss to hosts Russia in the Round of 16; the match had ended in a 1–1 draw after extra-time, with De Gea being beaten by an Artem Dzyuba penalty in the first half. De Gea ended the tournament having conceded six goals from seven shots on target, excluding the four goals he conceded in the penalty-shootout; with only one save, he recorded fewer saves than any other goalkeeper who had played at least three matches in a single edition of the tournament since 1966. De Gea criticised the Adidas Telstar 18 official match ball, calling it "really strange" and claiming that "it could have been made a lot better."

On 24 May 2021, De Gea was included in Luis Enrique's 24-man squad for UEFA Euro 2020, where he served as backup to Unai Simón. He was later excluded entirely from the Spain squad for the 2022 FIFA World Cup, with Simón, David Raya and Robert Sánchez selected as the three goalkeepers.

== Style of play ==
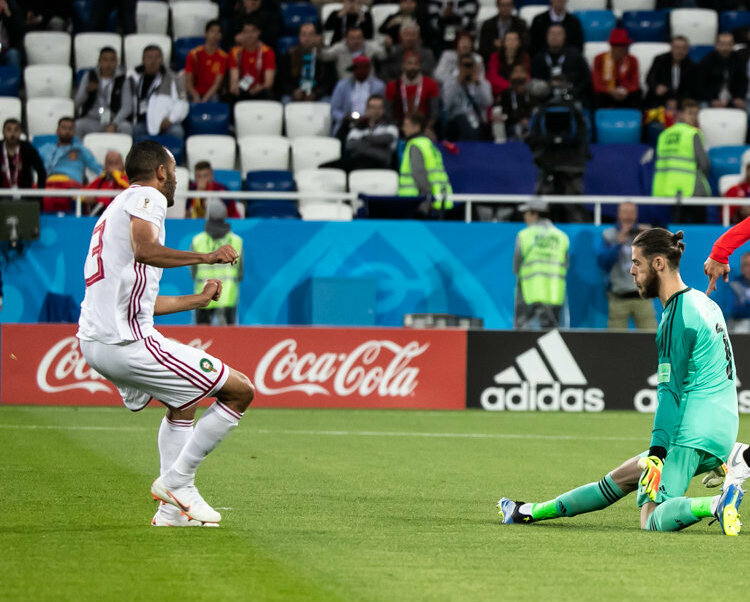
De Gea making a save with his feet against Morocco at the 2018 FIFA World Cup

De Gea was regarded as a promising goalkeeper in his youth. He later developed into one of the best professional goalkeepers in the world in his prime. De Gea grew up playing futsal as an outfield player until the age of 14. He has incorporated futsal goalkeeping techniques into his playing style, including the use of his feet to make saves.

De Gea has been complimented for his reflexes, agility, and is well known for making saves with his feet. In 2018 Shay Given called De Gea the best shot-stopper in the world.

Due to De Gea's slender frame, he initially struggled at defending high balls as a youngster, often punching balls away rather than holding on to them, and was at times reluctant to come off his line. He later showed improvements in his aerial prowess, handling, command of his area, decision making, and ability to come out and claim crosses, in particular after he developed physically and gained more experience, even being described as a "strong presence in the box" by Kyle Diller in 2012. However, in his later seasons at Manchester United, his inability to come off his line and deal with crosses was once again cited as a weakness in his game, in particular in comparison to teammate Dean Henderson.

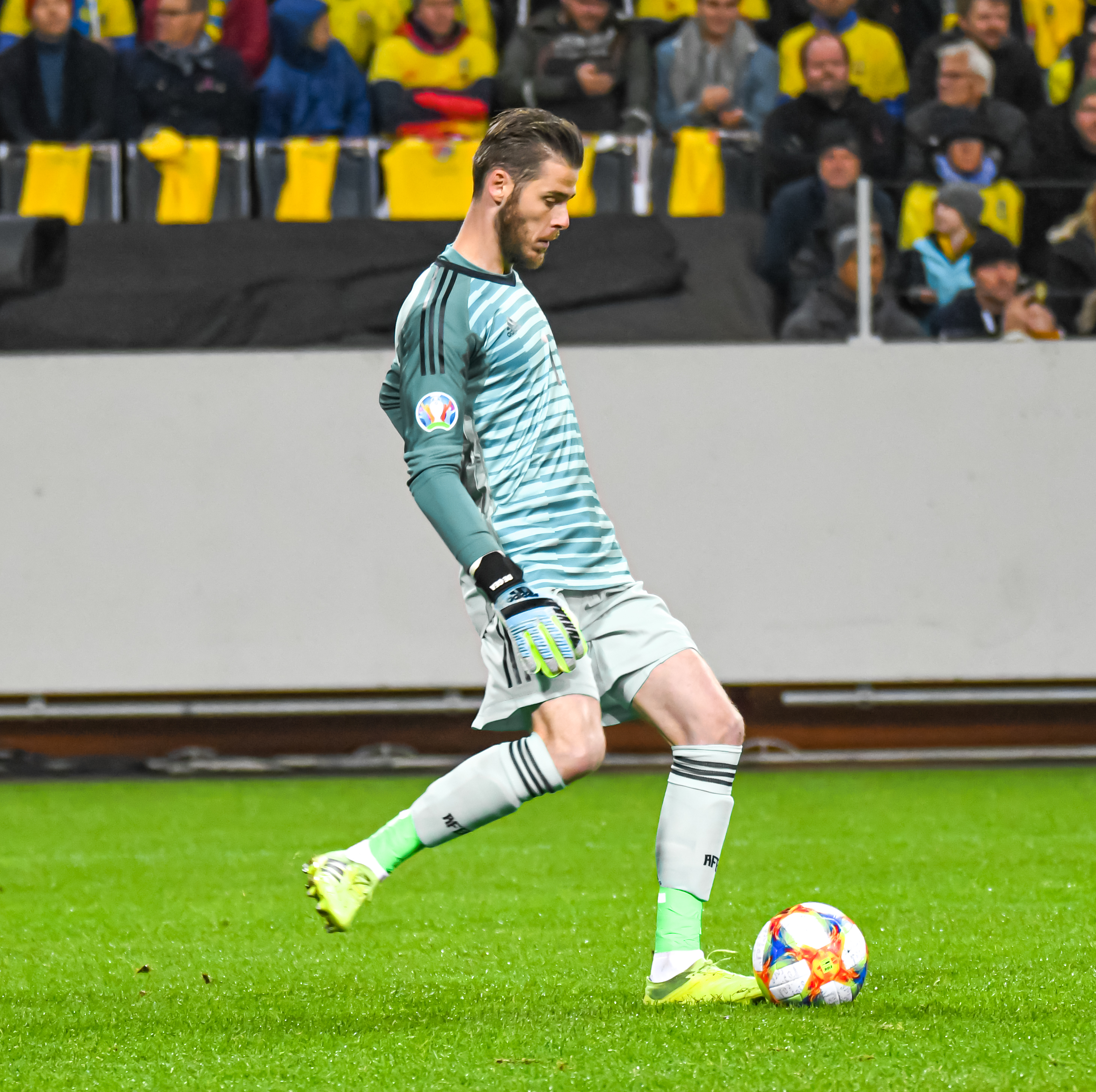
De Gea passing the ball whilst playing for Spain in 2019

De Gea is highly regarded for his speed when rushing off his line in one on one situations, which also enables him to function as a sweeper-keeper. In later seasons, however, Adam Bate of Sky Sports noted in 2019 that De Gea mainly stayed in his area and would come out to sweep up the ball less frequently than other leading keepers in the Premier League; his change in style also drew criticism from Mark Ogden of ESPN in 2020, while that same year, Mark Critchley of The Independent opined that De Gea "has never been especially comfortable playing behind a high line, regularly coming out second-best in one-on-ones with opposition strikers." Jonathan Wilson in a 2020 article for the Irish Times, also noted that sweeping was not a natural part of his game, and that his tendency to sit deeper with Manchester United in comparison to his position with Spain, who play with a higher line, was one of his reasons for his loss of form since his poor and error–prone performances at the 2018 World Cup.

In addition to his goalkeeping abilities, in his prime, De Gea possessed excellent ball control, vision, and distribution with either foot, which enabled him to start attacking plays from the back; in 2014, he credited his goalkeeping coach under Louis van Gaal, Frans Hoek, for helping him to develop this aspect of his game, which Mark Critchley of The Independent had initially criticised as being "average". However, in 2020 his distribution was once again described as being "limited" by Critchley, especially in comparison to other ball-playing goalkeepers in the Premier League, while in a 2018 article for The Guardian, Wilson felt that De Gea's unremarkable passing and lack of confidence with the ball at his feet was one of the reasons for the contrast between his performances with Manchester United and Spain. In addition, De Gea's effectiveness at stopping penalties has also been put into question in recent years, despite having saved penalties from specialists such as Leighton Baines, Diego Milito, Steven Gerrard and former teammate Robin van Persie throughout his career; he did not save a single penalty between April 2016 and September 2021. During that period, De Gea conceded 40 penalties, including all the eleven he conceded in the 2021 UEFA Europa League final shootout defeat to Villarreal.

== Personal life ==
In January 2012, De Gea was confirmed as farsighted, although this is not thought to have affected his performances. De Gea has stated that he is a fan of heavy metal music, with Avenged Sevenfold being one of his favourite bands. He has been in a relationship with Spanish singer Edurne since 2010, whom he married in Menorca on 1 July 2023. On 4 March 2021, the couple had their first child, a daughter named Yanay. He also founded an esports team under the name Rebels Gaming in 2021.

== Career statistics ==
=== Club ===
As of match played 8 November 2026

Appearances and goals by club, season and competition
Club	Season	League			National cup (Note: Includes Copa del Rey, FA Cup, Coppa Italia)		League cup (Note: Includes Football League/EFL Cup)		Europe		Other		Total	
Club	Season	Division	Apps	Goals	Apps	Goals	Apps	Goals	Apps	Goals	Apps	Goals	Apps	Goals
Atlético Madrid B	2008–09	Segunda División B	35	0	—		—		—		—		35	0
Atlético Madrid	2009–10	La Liga	19	0	7	0	—		9 (Note: One appearance in UEFA Champions League, eight appearances in UEFA Europa League)	0	—		35	0
Atlético Madrid	2010–11	La Liga	38	0	5	0	—		5 (Note: Appearances in UEFA Europa League)	0	1 (Note: Appearance in UEFA Super Cup)	0	49	0
Atlético Madrid	Total		57	0	12	0	—		14	0	1	0	84	0
Manchester United	2011–12	Premier League	29	0	1	0	0	0	8 (Note: Four appearances in UEFA Champions League, four appearances in UEFA Europa League)	0	1 (Note: Appearance in FA Community Shield)	0	39	0
Manchester United	2012–13	Premier League	28	0	5	0	1	0	7 (Note: Appearances in UEFA Champions League)	0	—		41	0
Manchester United	2013–14	Premier League	37	0	0	0	4	0	10	0	1	0	52	0
Manchester United	2014–15	Premier League	37	0	5	0	1	0	—		—		43	0
Manchester United	2015–16	Premier League	34	0	6	0	1	0	8 (Note: Six appearances in UEFA Champions League, two appearances in UEFA Europa League)	0	—		49	0
Manchester United	2016–17	Premier League	35	0	1	0	5	0	3	0	1	0	45	0
Manchester United	2017–18	Premier League	37	0	2	0	0	0	6	0	1	0	46	0
Manchester United	2018–19	Premier League	38	0	0	0	0	0	9	0	—		47	0
Manchester United	2019–20	Premier League	38	0	1	0	2	0	2	0	—		43	0
Manchester United	2020–21	Premier League	26	0	0	0	0	0	10 (Note: Five appearances in UEFA Champions League, five appearances in UEFA Europa League)	0	—		36	0
Manchester United	2021–22	Premier League	38	0	1	0	0	0	7	0	—		46	0
Manchester United	2022–23	Premier League	38	0	6	0	2	0	12	0	—		58	0
Manchester United	Total		415	0	28	0	16	0	82	0	4	0	545	0
Fiorentina	2024–25	Serie A	35	0	0	0	—		7 (Note: Appearances in UEFA Conference League)	0	—		42	0
Fiorentina	2025–26	Serie A	37	0	0	0	—		9	0	—		46	0
Fiorentina	2026–27	Serie A	11	0	2	0	—		—		—		13	0
Fiorentina	Total		83	0	2	0	—		16	0	—		101	0
Career total			590	0	42	0	16	0	112	0	5	0	765	0

=== International ===
As of match played 13 October 2020

Appearances and goals by national team and year
National team	Year	Apps	Goals
Spain	2014	3	0
Spain	2015	4	0
Spain	2016	11	0
Spain	2017	7	0
Spain	2018	13	0
Spain	2019	3	0
Spain	2020	4	0
Total		45	0

== Honours ==
Atlético Madrid

- UEFA Europa League: 2009–10
- UEFA Super Cup: 2010
- Copa del Rey runner-up: 2009–10

Manchester United

- Premier League: 2012–13
- FA Cup: 2015–16; runner-up: 2017–18, 2022–23
- EFL Cup: 2016–17, 2022–23
- FA Community Shield: 2011, 2013, 2016
- UEFA Europa League: 2016–17; runner-up: 2020–21

Spain U17

- UEFA European Under-17 Championship: 2007
- FIFA U-17 World Cup runner-up: 2007

Spain U21

- UEFA European Under-21 Championship: 2011, 2013

Spain

- UEFA Nations League runner-up: 2020–21

Individual

- Premier League Golden Glove: 2017–18, 2022–23
- Premier League Player of the Month: January 2022
- Premier League Save of the Month: February 2023
- PFA Team of the Year: 2012–13 Premier League, 2014–15 Premier League, 2015–16 Premier League, 2016–17 Premier League, 2017–18 Premier League
- PFA Fans' Premier League Player of the Month: November 2014
- Match of the Day Save of the Season: 2012–13, 2013–14, 2014–15, 2015–16, 2017–18
- UEFA Europa League Squad of the Season: 2015–16
- UEFA European Under-21 Championship Team of the Tournament: 2011, 2013
- FIFA FIFPro World11: 2018
- Sir Matt Busby Player of the Year: 2013–14, 2014–15, 2015–16, 2017–18
- Manchester United Players' Player of the Year: 2013–14, 2014–15, 2017–18, 2021–22
- Sports Illustrated Premier League Team of the Decade: 2010–2019
- Serie A Team of the Season: 2024–25
