= 2016 FA Community Shield =

- The match programme cover
Leicester City	Manchester United
1	2
- Date: 7 August 2016
- Venue: Wembley Stadium, London
- Man of the Match: Eric Bailly (Manchester United)
- Referee: Craig Pawson (South Yorkshire)
- Attendance: 85,437

The 2016 FA Community Shield (also known as The FA Community Shield supported by McDonald's for sponsorship reasons) was the 94th FA Community Shield, an annual English football match played between the winners of the previous season's Premier League and FA Cup. The match was contested by 2015–16 FA Cup winners Manchester United, and Leicester City, champions of the 2015–16 Premier League. It was held at Wembley Stadium a week before the Premier League season kicked off. Manchester United won the match 2–1 with goals from Jesse Lingard and Zlatan Ibrahimović, either side of a goal from Leicester striker Jamie Vardy.

Arsenal were the holders, having won the 2015 edition, but did not qualify for this match, as they finished second in the Premier League and got knocked out of the FA Cup in the sixth round.

== Background ==
Leicester City qualified as champions of the 2015–16 Premier League. They won the title after then-second place Tottenham Hotspur drew 2–2 to Chelsea in Stamford Bridge on 2 May 2016. It was only their second FA Charity/Community Shield, first since 1971, when they defeated Liverpool 1–0. It was also the first time they played as champions/runners–up of either top division league or FA Cup winners, as they played in 1971 as Second Division champions.

Manchester United qualified as winners of the 2015–16 FA Cup. They defeated Crystal Palace 2–1 after extra time on 21 May 2016 to win their 12th title (tying the then-record with Arsenal). It was their 30th FA Charity/Community Shield, winning a record 20.

The previous match between the two sides was a 1–1 draw at Old Trafford on 1 May 2016. Anthony Martial scored for United in the eighth minute, while Leicester captain Wes Morgan equalised nine minutes later.

Manchester United manager José Mourinho returned to the Community Shield for the second straight year, after managing for Chelsea in the 2015 FA Community Shield.

== Match ==
=== Summary ===
Jesse Lingard opened the scoring in the 32nd minute when he ran and got past three Leicester players before shooting low with his right foot past the onrushing Leicester goalkeeper Kasper Schmeichel who managed to get something on the shot but could not prevent it going into the net. Jamie Vardy made it 1–1 in the 52nd minute when he intercepted Marouane Fellaini's no-look back-pass before rounding David de Gea and slotting the ball low to the net with his left foot. Zlatan Ibrahimović got the winning goal for Manchester United in the 83rd minute when he got above Leicester captain Wes Morgan and headed in from six yards out into the right corner off the post after a cross from the right by Antonio Valencia.

=== Details ===
7 August 2016
16:00 BST

Leicester City	1–2	Manchester United
Vardy 52'	Report	Lingard 32'; Ibrahimović 83'

Wembley Stadium, London
Attendance: 85,437
Referee: Craig Pawson (South Yorkshire)

Leicester City	Manchester United

GK	1	(Denmark) Kasper Schmeichel
RB	17	(England) Danny Simpson	(yellow card) 40'	(substituted off) 63'
CB	6	(Germany) Robert Huth		(substituted off) 89'
CB	5	(Jamaica) Wes Morgan (c)
LB	28	(Austria) Christian Fuchs		(substituted off) 80'
RM	26	(Algeria) Riyad Mahrez
CM	10	(Wales) Andy King	(yellow card) 55'	(substituted off) 62'
CM	4	(England) Danny Drinkwater
LM	11	(England) Marc Albrighton		(substituted off) 46'
CF	20	(Japan) Shinji Okazaki		(substituted off) 46'
CF	9	(England) Jamie Vardy	(yellow card) 75'
Substitutes:
GK	21	(Germany) Ron-Robert Zieler
DF	2	(Spain) Luis Hernández		(substituted on) 63'
DF	15	(Ghana) Jeffrey Schlupp		(substituted on) 80'
MF	22	(England) Demarai Gray		(substituted on) 46'
MF	24	(France) Nampalys Mendy		(substituted on) 62'
FW	7	(Nigeria) Ahmed Musa		(substituted on) 46'
FW	23	(Argentina) Leonardo Ulloa		(substituted on) 89'
Manager:
(Italy) Claudio Ranieri

GK	1	(Spain) David de Gea
RB	25	(Ecuador) Antonio Valencia
CB	3	(Ivory Coast) Eric Bailly	(yellow card) 71'
CB	17	(Netherlands) Daley Blind
LB	23	(England) Luke Shaw		(substituted off) 69'
CM	16	(England) Michael Carrick		(substituted off) 61'
CM	27	(Belgium) Marouane Fellaini
RW	14	(England) Jesse Lingard		(substituted off) 63'
AM	10	(England) Wayne Rooney (c)		(substituted off) 87'
LW	11	(France) Anthony Martial		(substituted off) 70'
CF	9	(Sweden) Zlatan Ibrahimović
Substitutes:
GK	20	(Argentina) Sergio Romero
DF	5	(Argentina) Marcos Rojo		(substituted on) 69'
MF	8	(Spain) Juan Mata		(substituted on) 63'	(substituted off) 90+3'
MF	21	(Spain) Ander Herrera		(substituted on) 61'
MF	22	(Armenia) Henrikh Mkhitaryan			(substituted on) 90+3'
MF	28	(France) Morgan Schneiderlin		(substituted on) 87'
FW	19	(England) Marcus Rashford		(substituted on) 70'
Manager:
(Portugal) José Mourinho

Man of the Match:
Eric Bailly (Manchester United)

Assistant referees:
Stephen Child (Kent)
Lee Betts (Norfolk)
Fourth official:
Bobby Madley (West Yorkshire)

Match rules

- 90 minutes.
- Penalty shoot-out if scores level.
- Seven named substitutes, of which up to six may be used.

== See also ==
- 2016–17 Premier League
- 2016–17 FA Cup
