= Marcel Bout =

Dutch football coach and scout

Personal information
- Full name: Marcel Bout
- Date of birth: 18 November 1962 (age 63)
- Place of birth: Haarlem, Netherlands

Team information
- Current team: Newcastle United (scout)

Managerial career
- Years: Team
- 2006–2009: Jong AZ
- 2010: Telstar
- 2010–2011: Bayern Munich (assistant)
- 2014–2016: Manchester United (assistant)

Marcel Bout (born 18 November 1962) is a Dutch football coach and scout who works for Premier League club Newcastle United.

During a career in professional football spanning more than three decades, he has held coaching, analytical and recruitment positions with Feyenoord, Volendam, AZ, Bayern Munich, Manchester United and Newcastle United, as well as working with the Netherlands national team.

== Coaching and scouting career ==
=== Early coaching career ===
Bout began his coaching career in the Netherlands and joined Feyenoord in 1995. During almost nine years with the Rotterdam club, he worked in several positions within the coaching structure, including as a youth coach, training coach and recovery coach.

In January 2004, Bout left Feyenoord to join Volendam as assistant coach to Johan Steur. He subsequently remained at Volendam, working in youth development and scouting before leaving the club in 2006.

=== AZ and Telstar ===
In 2006, Bout joined AZ, where he was appointed coach of Jong AZ, the club's reserve team. He later became involved with the first-team staff under Louis van Gaal. During Bout's time at the club, AZ won the 2008–09 Eredivisie, the second Dutch league title in the club's history.

Bout left AZ in 2009 to join Telstar, initially working as a technical coordinator. In February 2010, he took charge of the first team following the departure of Edward Metgod.

He remained in charge of Telstar until the end of the 2009–10 season.

=== Bayern Munich and Netherlands ===
In 2010, Bout joined Bayern Munich, where he again worked with Louis van Gaal, initially as part of the Dutchman's coaching staff. Bout had previously worked with Van Gaal at AZ.

Van Gaal left Bayern in April 2011, but Bout remained at the club. Following Van Gaal's departure, assistant coach Andries Jonker was placed in charge for the remainder of the season, with Bout, Hermann Gerland and goalkeeping coach Walter Junghans forming part of his coaching staff.

Bout was subsequently retained at Bayern following the appointment of Jupp Heynckes and worked as a match analyst. He remained with the club until 2012.

After leaving Bayern, Bout returned to the Netherlands and worked with the Netherlands under-21 team, combining roles in coaching, technical analysis and scouting. He later joined the staff of the senior Netherlands national team under Van Gaal in the build-up to the 2014 FIFA World Cup.

=== Manchester United ===
In May 2014, Manchester United announced that Van Gaal would become the club's manager following the conclusion of the 2014 World Cup. Bout and Frans Hoek were announced as members of his coaching staff, alongside assistant manager Ryan Giggs.

Bout's role at Manchester United initially focused on opposition scouting and analysis. He served as an assistant coach specialising in opposition scouting during Van Gaal's two seasons as manager.

Bout remained at Manchester United following Van Gaal's departure in 2016. As part of a restructuring and expansion of the club's recruitment operation, he was promoted to head of global scouting later that year. Manchester United expanded its scouting network considerably during the reorganisation, adding more than 50 staff to its recruitment structure.

As head of global scouting, Bout became one of the senior figures in Manchester United's recruitment department, working alongside chief scout Jim Lawlor and other members of the club's recruitment operation.

Bout remained head of global scouting until April 2022, when he and Lawlor left Manchester United as the club began restructuring its recruitment operation. Manchester United stated that Bout had played an important role both as an assistant coach and in strengthening the club's scouting capabilities.

=== Newcastle United ===
In November 2023, Bout joined Premier League club Newcastle United in a global scouting role.

Following his appointment, Bout said his work would focus on identifying young players aged up to 23 who had the potential to progress into Newcastle's first team. He described his objective as finding emerging players before their transfer values increased substantially.

In a 2025 interview, Bout discussed his approach to scouting, emphasising the importance of assessing a player's character in addition to technical and physical qualities.
