= Frans Hoek =

Dutch footballer and coach

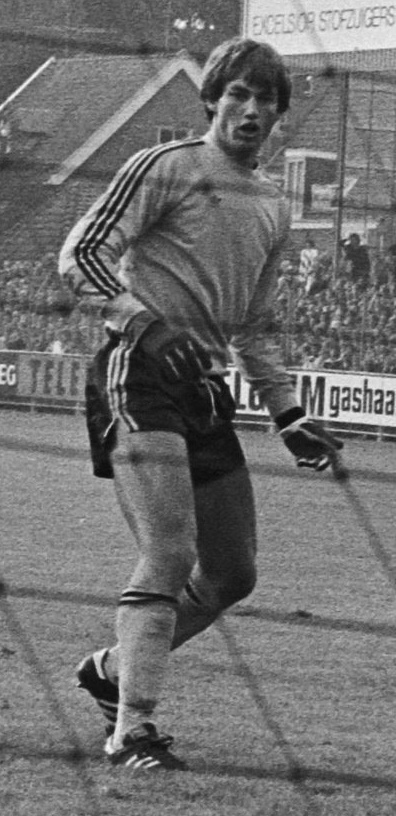
- Hoek in goal for Volendam in 1977

Personal information
- Full name: Franciscus Petrus Theodorus Hoek
- Date of birth: 17 October 1956 (age 70)
- Place of birth: Hoorn, Netherlands
- Position: Goalkeeper

Youth career
- 1966–1973: Always Forward

Senior career*
Years	Team	Apps	(Gls)
1973–1985	Volendam	337	(9)
- * Club domestic league appearances and goals

Franciscus Petrus Theodorus "Frans" Hoek (Dutch pronunciation: [frɑns ˈɦuk]; born 17 October 1956) is a Dutch football coach and former player. As a player, he was a goalkeeper for Volendam for more than a decade, before going into coaching as an assistant to Louis van Gaal at club sides Ajax, Barcelona, Bayern Munich and Manchester United, as well as the Netherlands national team. He also worked for the Poland national team under fellow Dutchman Leo Beenhakker. He has worked with goalkeepers including Edwin van der Sar, Stanley Menzo, Víctor Valdés, Vítor Baía, Pepe Reina, Robert Enke, Łukasz Fabiański, Thomas Kraft, Michel Vorm and David de Gea. Hoek is widely regarded as one of world football's foremost goalkeeping mentors.

== Playing career ==
Starting as an amateur goalkeeper at hometown club Always Forward, Hoek played in goal at Volendam from 1973 to 1985, and in 1977 he achieved top flight football for the first time in the club's history. Two years later, Volendam were relegated. In 1983, Hoek and his teammates were promoted back to the Eredivisie, where they spent another two seasons. Hoek scored against Roda JC in September 1983. In 1985, Hoek ended his playing career as a goalkeeper, moving into coaching.

== Coaching career ==
Hoek joined Ajax in 1986 as a coach, working under manager Johan Cruyff, and in 1991 became the goalkeeping coach of manager Louis van Gaal at the club. A young Edwin van der Sar was under the care of Hoek at Ajax. In between this, he also coached for two years the goalkeepers of his former club Volendam. In 1997, he followed van Gaal to Barcelona, where he oversaw the promotion of Víctor Valdés. He moved with van Gaal to the Netherlands national football team in 2000, and back to Barcelona again in 2002. From 2005, he was for four years the goalkeeping coach of the Poland national football team under manager Leo Beenhakker, where he went to the 2006 FIFA World Cup in Germany. Beenhakker had been the former head coach at Volendam, where Hoek spent his playing career. Following this, Hoek joined van Gaal again at Bayern Munich in 2010, where he received both the role of goalkeeping coach and an assistant coach. After van Gaal left Germany in 2011, the pair took over the Netherlands national football team (for the second time), going to UEFA Euro 2012 in Poland/Ukraine and the 2014 FIFA World Cup in Brazil.

Hoek again teamed up with van Gaal at Manchester United in the summer of 2014, replacing Chris Woods as the club's chief goalkeeping coach. Ryan Giggs became assistant manager, Albert Stuivenberg was added as assistant coach, and Marcel Bout was appointed as an assistant coach and chief opposition scout; the latter previously worked with Hoek at Bayern Munich.

Hoek also trains other professional goalkeeping coaches, and advises and lectures for FIFA, UEFA and the Royal Dutch Football Association (KNVB), among others, on goalkeeping. He previously advised Manchester United (before becoming chief goalkeeping coach), LA Galaxy and the Danish Football Association (DBU). His coaching style is known within the game as the "Hoek Method".

As of 2021, he is the technical director and senior advisor of U.S. club Orange County.
