= 1990–91 Manchester United F.C. season =

English football club season

Manchester United
1990–91 season
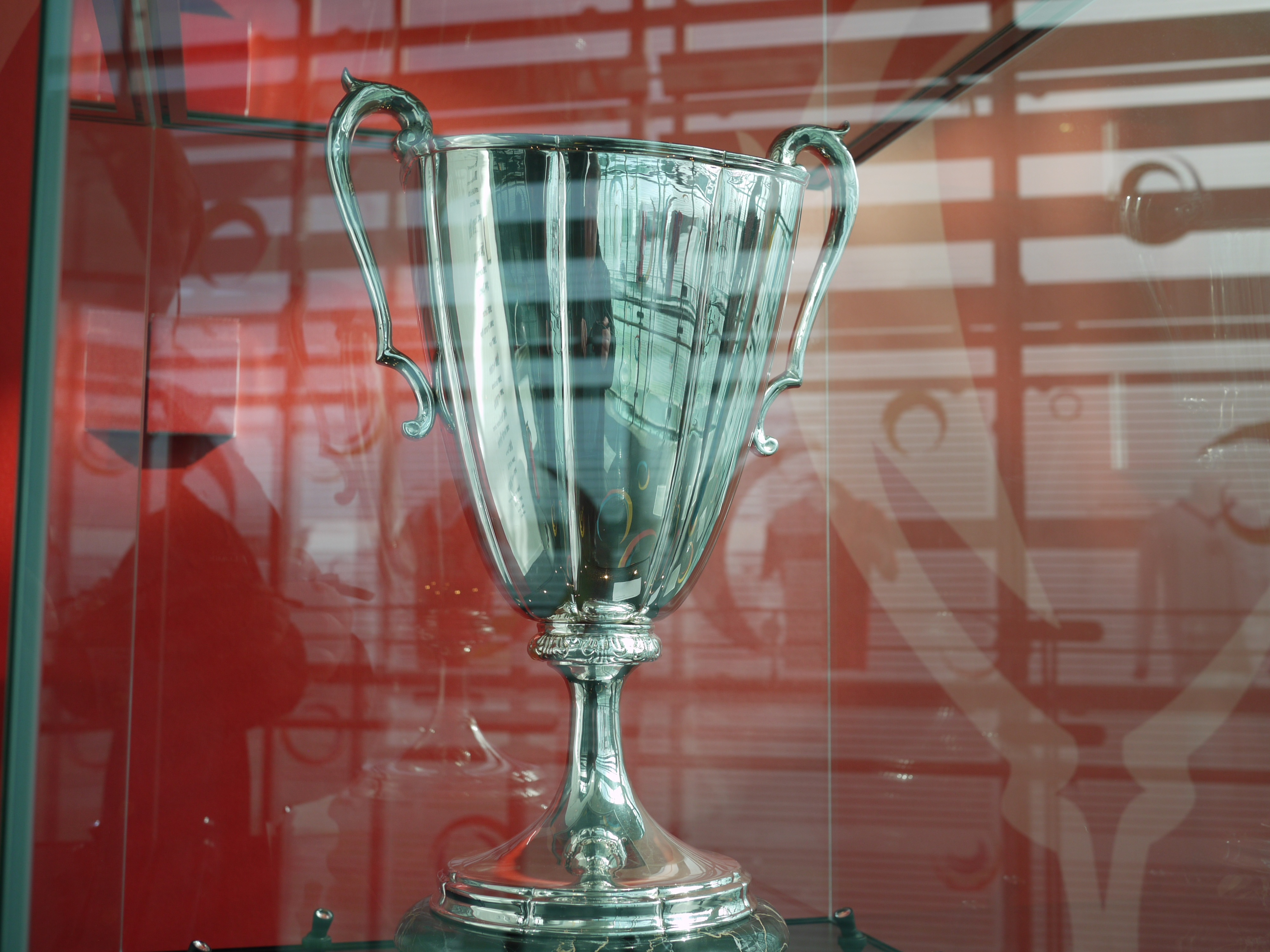
- The Cup Winners' Cup, on display at the National Football Museum in Manchester
- Chairman: Martin Edwards
- Manager: Alex Ferguson
- First Division: 6th
- FA Cup: Fifth round
- League Cup: Runners-up
- Cup Winners' Cup: Winners
- Charity Shield: Shared
- Top goalscorer: League: Brian McClair; Steve Bruce (13 each); All: Brian McClair; Mark Hughes (21 each)
- Highest home attendance: 47,485 vs Aston Villa (29 December 1990)
- Lowest home attendance: 29,405 vs Wrexham (23 October 1990)
- Average home league attendance: 43,222
Home colours	Away colours	Third colours

The 1990–91 season was Manchester United's 89th season in the Football League, and their 16th consecutive season in the top division of English football.

After winning the FA Cup the previous year to end a five-year trophy drought and claim their first major trophy under the management of Alex Ferguson, United went on to achieve more success by lifting the European Cup Winners' Cup – their first European trophy since their European Cup triumph 23 years earlier – by beating Barcelona 2–1 in Rotterdam, with Mark Hughes scoring both goals. It was the first season back in European competitions for English clubs following the lifting of the ban which had been imposed back in 1985 due to the Heysel Stadium disaster.

Hughes was voted PFA Player of the Year, while promising young winger Lee Sharpe was voted PFA Young Player of the Year. Fellow winger Ryan Giggs, aged 17 and said to be the club's finest young prospect since George Best, signed a professional contract in late November, and soon broke into the first team, making two league appearances and scoring one goal. A new arrival at the club was full-back Denis Irwin, signed from Oldham Athletic for a fee of £625,000 in the close season. Following his impressive performance in the previous season's FA Cup final replay, Les Sealey's loan move became permanent on a one-year contract, and he was the club's first choice goalkeeper for the season, but left on a free transfer at the season's end and signed for Aston Villa.

United also reached the League Cup final for the second time, but suffered a shock defeat to Sheffield Wednesday (managed by former United boss Ron Atkinson). In the league, United improved upon the previous season's 13th-place finish, but erratic form meant that they failed to mount a title challenge and finished sixth and were below neighbours Manchester City for the first time since 1978. Their defence of the FA Cup ended in the Fifth Round when they lost 2–1 to Norwich City.

Assistant manager Archie Knox resigned late in the campaign to take the same role at Rangers, and was replaced by Brian Kidd.

It was the final season at Old Trafford for veteran defender Viv Anderson, who had failed to reclaim his place in the first team and was sold to Sheffield Wednesday in January 1991. Winger Ralph Milne, who had not played a first team game for the club for nearly two years, was given a free transfer at the end of the season. Colin Gibson, who had rarely been selected since the 1988–89 season, was sold to Leicester City just before Christmas.

Goalkeeper Gary Walsh, who stood in for the injured Les Sealey in several late season games, made his first appearances for United in three years.

Lee Martin, the hero of the previous season's FA Cup final, suffered a back injury and appeared in less than half of the season's games, as Alex Ferguson chose Denis Irwin as his regular right-back and Clayton Blackmore as his regular left-back. Striker Mark Robins, another star of the cup run, had a less successful season, with fewer first team opportunities and just five goals in all competitions, despite some promising performances in the autumn.

== Pre-season and friendlies ==
Date	Opponents	H / A	Result F–A	Scorers	Attendance
1 August 1990	Bury	A	0–0		7,162
3 August 1990	Cork City	A	0–0		8,000
5 August 1990	Waterford United	A	4–0	Hughes, Anderson, Robins, Sharpe	4,750
8 August 1990	Derry City	A	1–1	Robins	9,710
11 August 1990	Irish League	N	3–0	McClair, Hughes, Wallace	10,037
13 August 1990	Bohemians	A	3–0	Robins (2), Wallace	13,878
15 August 1990	Rangers	A	1–0	Beardsmore	31,818
20 November 1990	Celtic	H	1–3	Hughes	41,658

== FA Charity Shield ==
Date	Opponents	H / A	Result F–A	Scorers	Attendance
18 August 1990	Liverpool	N	1–1	Blackmore 44'	66,558

== First Division ==
Date	Opponents	H / A	Result F–A	Scorers	Attendance	League position
25 August 1990	Coventry City	H	2–0	Bruce 57', Webb 70'	46,715	4th
28 August 1990	Leeds United	A	0–0		29,174	3rd
1 September 1990	Sunderland	A	1–2	McClair 70'	26,105	6th
4 September 1990	Luton Town	A	1–0	Robins 24'	12,576	4th
8 September 1990	Queens Park Rangers	H	3–1	McClair 3', Robins (2) 62', 81'	43,427	3rd
16 September 1990	Liverpool	A	0–4		35,726	6th
22 September 1990	Southampton	H	3–2	McClair 20', Blackmore 61', Hughes 62'	41,288	3rd
29 September 1990	Nottingham Forest	H	0–1		46,766	5th
20 October 1990	Arsenal	H	0–1		47,322	7th
27 October 1990	Manchester City	A	3–3	Hughes 37', McClair (2) 80', 83'	36,427	6th
3 November 1990	Crystal Palace	H	2–0	Webb 11', Wallace 19'	45,724	6th
10 November 1990	Derby County	A	0–0		21,115	6th
17 November 1990	Sheffield United	H	2–0	Bruce 65', Hughes 86'	45,903	6th
25 November 1990	Chelsea	H	2–3	Wallace 23', Hughes 72'	37,836	7th
1 December 1990	Everton	A	1–0	Sharpe 64'	32,400	7th
8 December 1990	Leeds United	H	1–1	Webb 49'	40,947	7th
15 December 1990	Coventry City	A	2–2	Hughes 5', Wallace 89'	17,106	9th
22 December 1990	Wimbledon	A	3–1	Bruce (2) 69' (pen.), 88' (pen.), Hughes 80'	9,644	7th
26 December 1990	Norwich City	H	3–0	Hughes 54', McClair (2) 69', 90'	39,801	6th
29 December 1990	Aston Villa	H	1–1	Bruce 17' (pen.)	47,485	6th
1 January 1991	Tottenham Hotspur	A	2–1	Bruce 37' (pen.), McClair 90'	29,399	5th
12 January 1991	Sunderland	H	3–0	Hughes (2) 8', 41', McClair 15'	45,394	5th
19 January 1991	Queens Park Rangers	A	1–1	Phelan 83'	18,544	5th
3 February 1991	Liverpool	H	1–1	Bruce 26' (pen.)	43,690	5th
26 February 1991	Sheffield United	A	1–2	Blackmore 52' (pen.)	27,570	5th
2 March 1991	Everton	H	0–2		45,656	5th
9 March 1991	Chelsea	A	2–3	Hughes 33', McClair 62'	22,818	6th
13 March 1991	Southampton	A	1–1	Ince 57'	15,701	5th
16 March 1991	Nottingham Forest	A	1–1	Blackmore 38'	23,859	5th
23 March 1991	Luton Town	H	4–1	Bruce (2) 7', 47', Robins 70', McClair 83'	41,752	5th
30 March 1991	Norwich City	A	3–0	Bruce (2) 18', 74' (pen.), Ince 30'	18,282	5th
2 April 1991	Wimbledon	H	2–1	Bruce 54', McClair 88'	36,660	5th
6 April 1991	Aston Villa	A	1–1	Sharpe 63'	33,307	5th
16 April 1991	Derby County	H	3–1	Blackmore 22', McClair 66', Robson 85'	32,776	4th
4 May 1991	Manchester City	H	1–0	Giggs 22'	45,286	6th
6 May 1991	Arsenal	A	1–3	Bruce 90' (pen.)	40,229	6th
11 May 1991	Crystal Palace	A	0–3		25,301	6th
20 May 1991	Tottenham Hotspur	H	1–1	Ince 7'	46,791	6th

Pos	Team	Pld	W	D	L	GF	GA	GD	Pts	Qualification or relegation
4	Leeds United	38	19	7	12	65	47	+18	64	
5	Manchester City	38	17	11	10	64	53	+11	62	
6	Manchester United	38	16	12	10	58	45	+13	59 (Note: Arsenal deducted two points; Manchester United deducted one point due to a brawl in a game between both teams.)	Qualification for the Cup Winners' Cup first round
7	Wimbledon	38	14	14	10	53	46	+7	56	
8	Nottingham Forest	38	14	12	12	65	50	+15	54	

Source: World Football
Rules for classification: 1) Points; 2) Goal difference; 3) Goals scored

== FA Cup ==
Date	Round	Opponents	H / A	Result F–A	Scorers	Attendance
7 January 1991	Round 3	Queens Park Rangers	H	2–1	Hughes 19', McClair 74'	35,065
26 January 1991	Round 4	Bolton Wanderers	H	1–0	Hughes 79'	43,293
18 February 1991	Round 5	Norwich City	A	1–2	McClair 37'	23,058

== League Cup ==
Date	Round	Opponents	H / A	Result F–A	Scorers	Attendance
26 September 1990	Round 2 First leg	Halifax Town	A	3–1	Blackmore 25', McClair 87', Webb 88'	6,841
10 October 1990	Round 2 Second leg	Halifax Town	H	2–1	Bruce 42' (pen.), Anderson 58'	22,295
31 October 1990	Round 3	Liverpool	H	3–1	Bruce 36' (pen.), Hughes 37', Sharpe 81'	42,033
28 November 1990	Round 4	Arsenal	A	6–2	Blackmore 2', Hughes 44', Sharpe (3) 44', 75', 78', Wallace 81'	40,844
16 January 1991	Round 5	Southampton	A	1–1	Hughes 78'	21,101
23 January 1991	Round 5 Replay	Southampton	H	3–2	Hughes (3) 51', 61', 79'	41,903
10 February 1991	Semi-final; First leg	Leeds United	H	2–1	Sharpe 67', McClair 80'	34,050
24 February 1991	Semi-final; Second leg	Leeds United	A	1–0	Sharpe 90'	32,014
21 April 1991	Final	Sheffield Wednesday	N	0–1		77,612

== Cup Winners' Cup ==
Special Edition kit worn in the final

Date	Round	Opponents	H / A	Result F–A	Scorers	Attendance
19 September 1990	Round 1 First leg	Pécsi Munkás	H	2–0	Blackmore 9', Webb 16'	28,411
3 October 1990	Round 1 Second leg	Pécsi Munkás	A	1–0	McClair 77'	17,000
23 October 1990	Round 2 First leg	Wrexham	H	3–0	McClair 40', Bruce 42' (pen.), Pallister 59'	29,405
7 November 1990	Round 2 Second leg	Wrexham	A	2–0	Robins 31', Bruce 35'	13,327
6 March 1991	Quarter-finals; First leg	Montpellier	H	1–1	McClair 1'	41,942
19 March 1991	Quarter-finals; Second leg	Montpellier	A	2–0	Blackmore 45+4', Bruce 49' (pen.)	18,000
10 April 1991	Semi-finals; First leg	Legia Warsaw	A	3–1	McClair 38', Hughes 54', Bruce 67'	20,000
24 April 1991	Semi-finals; Second leg	Legia Warsaw	H	1–1	Sharpe 28'	44,269
15 May 1991	Final	Barcelona	N	2–1	Hughes (2) 67', 74'	45,000

== Events of the season ==
The 1989–90 campaign had brought Alex Ferguson his first major trophy in four seasons as manager of Manchester United, as they defeated Crystal Palace after a replay to win the FA Cup for the seventh time, equalling the record held by Aston Villa and Tottenham Hotspur. However, their league form had arguably been their worst since relegation 16 years earlier, as they finished 13th in the First Division, and the squad still needed a few changes before United could be seen as serious title challengers.

Goalkeeper Les Sealey had received a permanent contract after a successful loan spell at Old Trafford that had begun the previous December when he joined from Luton Town, and for the 1990–91 season Ferguson chose Sealey as his first choice goalkeeper. Previous first choice goalkeeper Jim Leighton remained at the club, facing competition for second choice status from the younger Gary Walsh and Mark Bosnich. Ferguson's only other major signing of the summer was Denis Irwin, the Republic of Ireland international who joined from Oldham Athletic and was capable of playing on either side of defence, providing competition for Mike Phelan on the right and Lee Martin and Clayton Blackmore on the left. The midfield line-up was similarly impressive – Paul Ince, Neil Webb, Bryan Robson and Danny Wallace – with the added bonus of Phelan also being able to play in central midfield or on the right side. 19-year-old Lee Sharpe was capable of playing on either wing, showing promise as a star of the future. In attack, Mark Hughes and Brian McClair were an established partnership but 21-year-old Mark Robins was looking like a top striker of the future and a possible threat to McClair's place in the team.

On 10 July 1990, UEFA confirmed that English clubs would be able to compete in European competitions after five years following the Heysel disaster, meaning that Manchester United would be able to compete in the European Cup Winners' Cup.

The league season began six weeks later with a 2–0 home win over Coventry City in the First Division, a week after they were joint winners of the FA Charity Shield with a 1–1 draw against Liverpool at Wembley Stadium.

On 19 September, Manchester United marked their return to European competition with a 2–0 win over Pecsi Munkas of Hungary in the first round first leg of the European Cup Winners' Cup, progressing to the next stage of the European Cup Winners' Cup two weeks later by winning the second leg 1–0. By that date, they had also progressed to the Football League Cup third round with a 5–2 aggregate win over Halifax Town in the second round.

There were ugly scenes at Old Trafford on 20 October, when all 11 Manchester United players and 10 Arsenal players were involved in a brawl in the First Division clash at Old Trafford. Arsenal won 1–0 but United were docked a league point for this, while Arsenal (who, by this stage, were the biggest threat to leaders Liverpool in the title race) were docked two points and both clubs were fined £50000.

Three days later, Manchester United defeated Wrexham 3–0 in the European Cup Winners' Cup second round first leg at Old Trafford. At the end of the month, they eliminated Liverpool from the Football League Cup in the third round with a 3–1 win at Old Trafford, condemning the First Division leaders to their first defeat in a competitive game that season.

A 5–0 aggregate win over Wrexham completed on 7 November took them into the quarter-finals of the European Cup Winners' Cup.

On 27 November, Alex Ferguson offered a five-year contract to Ryan Giggs, a winger said to be the finest prospect in the British game since George Best. Giggs, who was born in Cardiff, would be eligible to sign a professional contract from his 17th birthday two days later. He obliged, and his first team debut was looking inevitable.

The day before Ryan Giggs signed for Manchester United, fellow youngster Lee Sharpe scored a hat-trick for Manchester United as they defeated Arsenal 6–2 in the Football League Cup fourth round at Highbury, meaning that the Football League Cup wouldn't be heading to North London in 1991. Sharpe had another fine game four days later when he scored the only goal of the game at Goodison Park in a 1–0 win over Everton, who had made a dismal start to the First Division campaign and were in the bottom half of the table just 12 months after being title contenders.

1991 began with 2–1 win for Alex Ferguson's men at Tottenham Hotspur, though the biggest piece of news arising from the game was that the opposition's Paul Gascoigne became the first player to be sent off in a live televised First Division game.

Six days later, their defence of the FA Cup began with a 2–1 win over Queen's Park Rangers in the third round at Old Trafford, and the following week they drew 1–1 at Southampton in the Football League Cup quarter-final, winning the replay 3–2 at Old Trafford thanks to a Mark Hughes hat-trick. Before the month was out, United defeated Third Division Bolton Wanderers 1–0 in the FA Cup fourth round at Old Trafford.

On 10 February 1991, Manchester United beat Leeds United 2–1 in the Football League Cup semi-final first leg at Old Trafford, and two weeks later they reached the final by winning the second leg 1–0. A week earlier, however, their FA Cup defence had ended in the fifth round with a 2–1 defeat at Norwich City, a side who had given the big clubs a surprise run for their money several times in the last five years.

2 March saw the much awaited debut of Ryan Giggs, who came on as a substitute for the injured Denis Irwin in a 2–0 home defeat by Everton in the First Division.

Four days later, Manchester United drew 1–1 at home to Montpellier HSC in the European Cup Winners' Cup quarter-final first leg, reaching the semi-final two weeks later by winning the return leg 2–0 in France.

The contest for a place in the final began on 10 April with a 3–1 away win over Legia Warsaw of Poland in the European Cup Winners' Cup semi-final first leg.

On 21 April, Manchester United suffered a surprise 1–0 defeat to Sheffield Wednesday (managed by their former manager Ron Atkinson) in the Football League Cup final. The only goal of the game was scored by Irish international midfielder John Sheridan, a self-confessed Manchester United supporter. Three days later, however, they reached the European Cup Winners' Cup final for the first time with a 4–2 aggregate win over Legia Warsaw.

The final was won on 15 May 1991 in Rotterdam thanks to a 2–1 win over FC Barcelona, with Mark Hughes scored both goals against the team he had spent an unsuccessful campaign with four seasons earlier.

1990–91 was another highly successful season for Manchester United after a few years of frustration, with the boardroom featuring a major trophy once more. They had also been runners-up in a second cup final. It was the first time in 23 years that United had won a major trophy in successive seasons. Their league form had also improved, but a lack of consistency restricted them to a sixth-place finish – one place below City, who had not finished above them for more than a decade. The league title went to Arsenal for the second time in three seasons, while Liverpool finished second in what at the time was unusually a trophyless season for them. United were not the only side threatening to break up the recent Liverpool-Arsenal dominance of English football. A year after taking United to a replay in the FA Cup final, former United player Steve Coppell enjoyed another successful season with Crystal Palace, who finished third in the league. Another former United player, Gordon Strachan, was a key player in Leeds United's impressive return to the First Division as the West Yorkshire side finished fourth. There was also a threat emerging from the blue half of Manchester for the first time in a decade, as City finished fifth under new player-manager Peter Reid.

Les Sealey's one-year contract expired at the end of the season, and he now wanted a two-year deal, but departed on a free transfer to Aston Villa after being offered only a one-year deal. Also on his way out of the club was Ralph Milne, given a free transfer more than a year after his final first-team appearance.

During the close season, United added the Brøndby and Denmark goalkeeper Peter Schmeichel and QPR's England right-back Paul Parker to their ranks.

1991–92 would be United's 25th season since their last league title triumph, and Alex Ferguson was determined to make sure that the title wait would end then.

== Squad statistics ==
Pos.	Name	League		FA Cup		Rumbelows Cup		Europe		Other		Total	
Pos.	Name	Apps	Goals	Apps	Goals	Apps	Goals	Apps	Goals	Apps	Goals	Apps	Goals
GK	(Australia) Mark Bosnich	2	0	0	0	0	0	0	0	0	0	2	0
GK	(Scotland) Jim Leighton	0	0	0	0	1	0	0	0	0	0	1	0
GK	(England) Les Sealey	31	0	3	0	8	0	8	0	1	0	51	0
GK	(England) Gary Walsh	5	0	0	0	0	0	1	0	0	0	6	0
DF	(England) Viv Anderson	1	0	0	0	1	1	1	0	0	0	3	1
DF	(Wales) Clayton Blackmore	35	4	3	0	9	2	9	2	1	1	57	9
DF	(England) Steve Bruce	31	13	3	0	7	2	8	4	1	0	50	19
DF	(Northern Ireland) Mal Donaghy	17(8)	0	0	0	3(4)	0	2(3)	0	1	0	23(15)	0
DF	(Republic of Ireland) Denis Irwin	33(1)	0	3	0	7(1)	0	6	0	1	0	50(2)	0
DF	(England) Lee Martin	7(7)	0	1	0	2(2)	0	3(2)	0	0	0	13(11)	0
DF	(England) Gary Pallister	36	0	3	0	9	0	9	1	1	0	58	1
DF	(England) Neil Whitworth	1	0	0	0	0	0	0	0	0	0	1	0
MF	(England) Russell Beardsmore	5(7)	0	0	0	1	0	1(1)	0	0	0	7(8)	0
MF	(Scotland) Darren Ferguson	2(3)	0	0	0	0	0	0	0	0	0	2(3)	0
MF	(Wales) Ryan Giggs	1(1)	1	0	0	0	0	0	0	0	0	1(1)	1
MF	(England) Paul Ince	31	3	2	0	6	0	7	0	1	0	47	3
MF	(Soviet Union) Andrei Kanchelskis	1	0	0	0	0	0	0	0	0	0	1	0
MF	(England) Mike Phelan	30(3)	1	1	0	7(1)	0	8	0	1	0	47(4)	1
MF	(England) Bryan Robson	15(2)	1	3	0	5	0	4	0	0	0	27(2)	1
MF	(England) Lee Sharpe	20(3)	2	3	0	7	6	6(2)	1	0	0	36(5)	9
MF	(England) Neil Webb	31(1)	3	2	0	7	1	6	1	0	0	46(1)	5
MF	(England) Paul Wratten	0(2)	0	0	0	0	0	0	0	0	0	0(2)	0
FW	(Wales) Mark Hughes	29(2)	10	3	2	9	6	7(1)	3	1	0	49(3)	21
FW	(Scotland) Brian McClair	34(2)	13	3	2	9	2	9	4	1	0	56(2)	21
FW	(England) Mark Robins	7(12)	4	0(1)	0	0(3)	0	2(1)	1	0(1)	0	9(18)	5
FW	(England) Danny Wallace	13(6)	3	0(1)	0	1(3)	1	2(1)	0	1	0	17(11)	4

== Transfers ==
=== In ===
Date	Pos.	Name	From	Fee
26 March 1991	MF	(Soviet Union) Andrei Kanchelskis	(Soviet Union) Shakhtar Donetsk	£650k

=== Out ===
Date	Pos.	Name	To	Fee
July 1990	DF	(England) Michael Gray	(England) Sunderland	Undisclosed
August 1990	DF	(England) Mike Duxbury	(England) Blackburn Rovers	Undisclosed
13 September 1990	FW	(England) Andy Rammell	(England) Barnsley	£100k
20 December 1990	DF	(England) Colin Gibson	(England) Leicester City	£100k
11 December 1990	DF	(England) Tony Gill	Released	Free
9 January 1991	DF	(England) Viv Anderson	(England) Sheffield Wednesday	Undisclosed
6 March 1991	MF	(England) Wayne Bullimore	(England) Barnsley	Undisclosed
15 March 1991	MF	(England) Paul McGuinness	Released	Free
30 June 1991	GK	(Australia) Mark Bosnich	Released	Free
30 June 1991	FW	(England) Marcus Brameld	Released	Free
30 June 1991	MF	(Wales) Lee Costa	Released	Free
30 June 1991	DF	(Northern Ireland) Alan McReavie	Released	Free
30 June 1991	MF	(Scotland) Ralph Milne	(England) Bury	Undisclosed
30 June 1991	GK	(England) Mike Pollitt	(England) Bury	Undisclosed
30 June 1991	DF	(England) Les Potts	Released	Free
30 June 1991	MF	(England) Roger Sallis	Released	Free
30 June 1991	GK	(England) Les Sealey	(England) Aston Villa	Undisclosed
30 June 1991	MF	(England) John Sharples	(Scotland) Hearts	Undisclosed
30 June 1991	MF	(England) Jimmy Shields	Released	Free
30 June 1991	GK	(England) Jonathan Stanger	Released	Free
30 June 1991	DF	(England) Alan Tonge	(England) Exeter City	Undisclosed
30 June 1991	MF	(England) David Wilson	(England) Exeter City	Undisclosed

=== Loan out ===
Date From	Date To	Position	Name	To
27 September 1990	27 October 1990	DF	(England) Colin Gibson	(England) Port Vale
5 October 1990	5 November 1990	GK	(England) Mike Pollitt	(England) Oldham Athletic
October 1990	November 1990	MF	(England) David Wilson	(England) Lincoln City
20 November 1990	20 December 1990	DF	(Republic of Ireland) Derek Brazil	(England) Oldham Athletic
17 January 1991	17 February 1991	DF	(Republic of Ireland) Brian Carey	(England) Wrexham
20 March 1991	20 April 1991	GK	(Scotland) Jim Leighton	(England) Arsenal
March 1991	May 1991	DF	(England) David Wilson	(England) Charlton Athletic
