= 2025 UEFA Europa League final =

- Match programme cover
- Event: 2024–25 UEFA Europa League
Tottenham Hotspur	Manchester United
(The Football Association)	(The Football Association)
1	0
- Date: 21 May 2025
- Venue: San Mamés, Bilbao
- Man of the Match: Cristian Romero (Tottenham Hotspur)
- Referee: Felix Zwayer (Germany)
- Attendance: 49,224
- Weather: Partly cloudy night 14 °C (57 °F); 78% humidity

The 2025 UEFA Europa League final was the final match of the 2024–25 UEFA Europa League, the 54th season of Europe's secondary club football tournament organized by UEFA, and the 16th season since it was renamed from the UEFA Cup to the UEFA Europa League.

The match was played at San Mamés in Bilbao, Spain, on 21 May 2025, between English clubs Tottenham Hotspur and Manchester United. It was the eleventh tournament final to feature two teams from the same association and the third all-English final.

Tottenham Hotspur won the match 1–0 for their third UEFA Cup/Europa League title, their first European trophy since 1984, and a first major trophy since winning the 2008 Football League Cup final. In doing so, Spurs drew level with Liverpool as the competition's most successful English club and joint-second-most successful overall (along with Inter Milan, Juventus and Atlético Madrid). As winners, they earned a league phase spot in the 2025–26 UEFA Champions League and the right to play against the winners of the 2024–25 UEFA Champions League, Paris Saint Germain, in the 2025 UEFA Super Cup.

== Background ==
Tottenham Hotspur reached their fourth UEFA Cup/UEFA Europa League final, the first time since the competition was rebranded in 2009. This was the sixth time they appeared in the final of a UEFA competition, having played in one UEFA Champions League final (losing in 2019), one Cup Winners' Cup final (winning in 1963 to become the first British team to win a European trophy), and three UEFA Cup finals (winning the inaugural competition in 1972 and then in 1984, and losing in 1974). Tottenham was searching for their first win in a final since winning the 2008 Football League Cup final, since then they had lost three League Cup finals; in 2009, 2015, and 2021, as well as the 2019 Champions League final. This was only the second time United had Spurs had faced each other in any major cup final, having faced each other in the 2009 Football League Cup final at Wembley Stadium which United won on penalties following a 0-0 draw. The clubs had previously only met in European competition during the second round of the 1963-64 European Cup Winners Cup (where Spurs were the defending champions) with United winning the two-legged tie 4-3 on aggregate with Spurs winning the first leg 2-0 at White Hart Lane only for United to overturn the two goal first leg deficit by winning the second leg 4-1 at Old Trafford.

Manchester United reached their thirteenth final in UEFA competitions, having won the European Cup/Champions League on three occasions (1968—the first English team to win the title, 1999, and 2008) and lost twice (2009 and 2011). They have also won one Cup Winners' Cup final (1991), played in two UEFA Europa League finals (winning in 2017 and losing in 2021), and contested four UEFA Super Cups (winning in 1991 and losing in 1999, 2008 and 2017).

This was the third all-English final in the history of the competition, after 1972 between Tottenham and Wolverhampton Wanderers and 2019 between Arsenal and Chelsea, and the sixth all-English final in UEFA's three main competitions, with three all-English UEFA Champions League finals; both Manchester United (against Tottenham's rivals Chelsea in 2008) and Tottenham (against United's arch-rivals Liverpool) having appeared in one of those 'derby' finals. The other all-English major European final happened in 2021, when United's cross-city rivals Manchester City lost their first Champions League final to Chelsea. The 2019 UEFA Super Cup also featured two English clubs, Chelsea and Liverpool, making it seven European title-deciding matches between English sides. Prior to the final, Tottenham had played nine games against fellow English sides in Europe, with the most recent being the 2019 Champions League final. They won and lost four matches each, with the only draw happened in the first leg of the 1972 UEFA Cup final. Furthermore, they had won every European two-legged tie against English sides. This was also the case for United until their most recent tie in 2016, when they were knocked out by Liverpool in the UEFA Europa League round of 16. Before the final, their European record against English sides were six wins, three draws, and two losses.

Due to coefficient rankings, this all-English final also confirmed that there would be an unprecedented six teams from the 2024–25 Premier League qualifying for the 2025–26 UEFA Champions League.

The sides had met 204 times previously, with United winning 95 matches and Tottenham 57. They had met in two title-deciding matches, the 1967 FA Charity Shield and the aforementioned 2009 Football League Cup final, both of which ended in draws; however, United won the latter against the holders on penalties. In Europe, they were paired in 1963 the first ever tie between two English clubs in Europe in which FA Cup holders United eliminated Tottenham, who were the tournament defending champions, in the second round of the Cup Winners' Cup.

The two clubs met twice during the 2024–25 Premier League season, with Tottenham winning both matches, 3–0 at Old Trafford and 1–0 at Tottenham Hotspur Stadium. Tottenham also beat United 4–3 in the 2024–25 EFL Cup quarter-finals, the first time United lost three times against Tottenham in the same season. In the build-up to the final, media attention focused on both clubs' poor league form throughout the season; before the final match, both United and Tottenham were placed only above the team-confirmed relegation zone and mathematically certain to finish in the bottom half of the Premier League. As a result, whichever club lost the final would not play in any European competition during the 2025–26 season, with the winners' season being 'saved' by reaching the lucrative Champions League despite their poor domestic campaign.

In this season, the two clubs (England's only entrants) had finished in the top eight in the competition's league phase, involving a new format with a single table of 36 teams each playing eight opponents once; consequently they progressed to the round of 16 and were seeded, with the knockout ties using the familiar two-leg system. Manchester United's victory over Olympique Lyonnais in the quarter-finals, in which they scored three times in the last few minutes of extra-time to turn a 4–2 deficit into a 5–4 win, was described in the media as one of the greatest comebacks in the history of European football. In the semi-finals United defeated the 'host' club for the final, Athletic Bilbao, while Tottenham eliminated the tournament's surprise package, Bodø/Glimt of Norway, each winning both the home and away legs.

=== Previous finals ===
In the following table, the finals until 2009 were in the UEFA Cup era and since 2010 were in the UEFA Europa League era.

Team	Previous final appearances (bold indicates winners)
(The Football Association) Tottenham Hotspur	3 (**1972**, 1974, **1984**)
(The Football Association) Manchester United	2 (**2017**, 2021)

== Venue ==
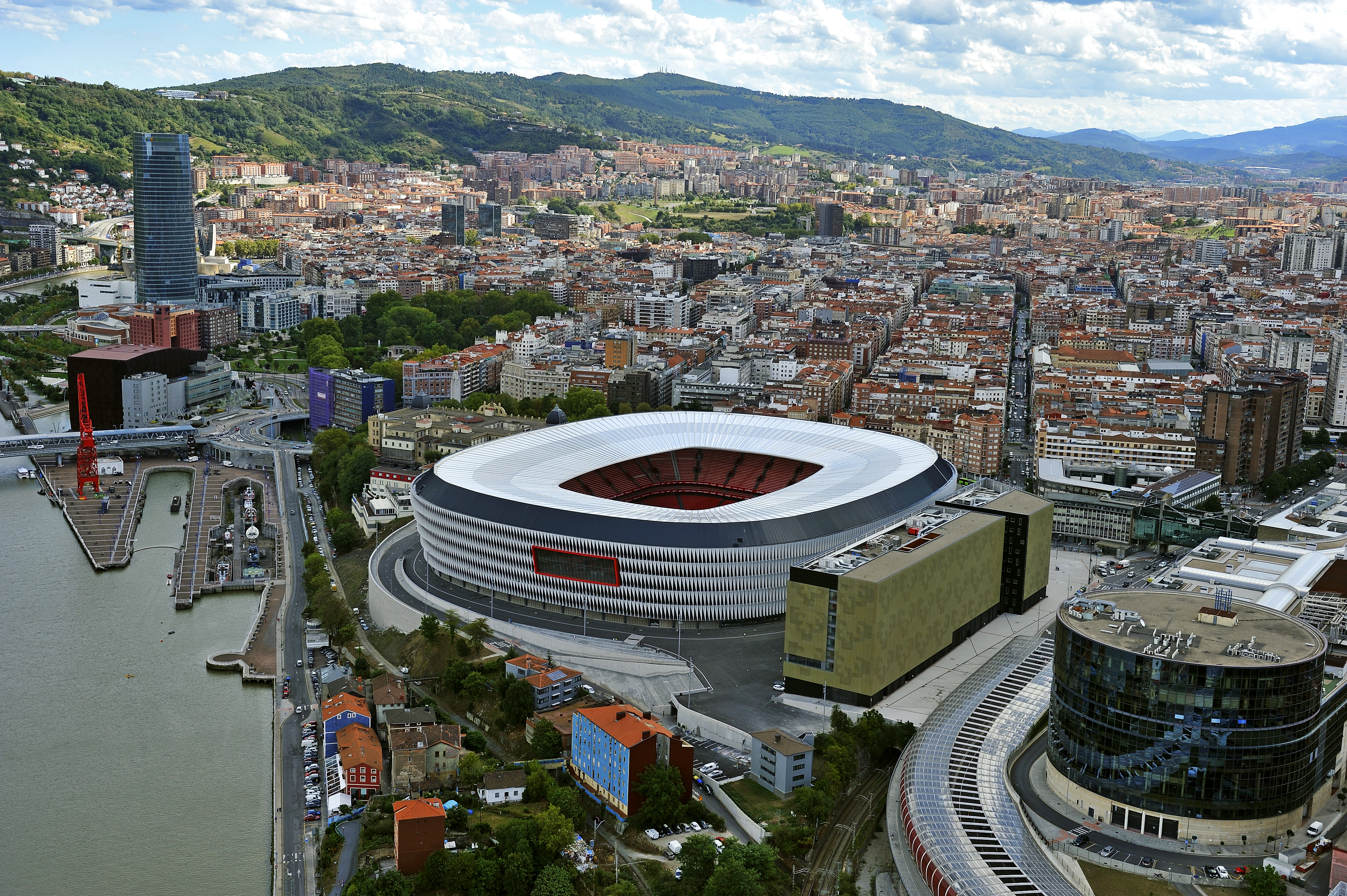
San Mamés Stadium in Bilbao hosted the final.

=== Host selection ===
On 16 July 2021, the UEFA Executive Committee announced that due to the loss of hosting rights for UEFA Euro 2020, San Mamés Stadium in Bilbao was given hosting rights for the 2025 final and the 2024 UEFA Women's Champions League final. This was part of a settlement agreement by UEFA to recognise the efforts and financial investment made to host UEFA Euro 2020.

== Route to the final ==
Note: In all results below, the score of the finalist is given first (H: home; A: away).

(The Football Association) Tottenham Hotspur				Round	(The Football Association) Manchester United			
Opponent	Result			League phase	Opponent	Result		
(Association of Football Federations of Azerbaijan) Qarabağ	3–0 (H)			Matchday 1	(Royal Dutch Football Association) Twente	1–1 (H)		
(Hungarian Football Federation) Ferencváros	2–1 (A)			Matchday 2	(Portuguese Football Federation) Porto	3–3 (A)		
(Royal Dutch Football Association) AZ	1–0 (H)			Matchday 3	(Turkish Football Federation) Fenerbahçe	1–1 (A)		
(Turkish Football Federation) Galatasaray	2–3 (A)			Matchday 4	(Hellenic Football Federation) PAOK	2–0 (H)		
(Italian Football Federation) Roma	2–2 (H)			Matchday 5	(Norwegian Football Federation) Bodø/Glimt	3–2 (H)		
(Scottish Football Association) Rangers	1–1 (A)			Matchday 6	(Football Association of the Czech Republic) Viktoria Plzeň	2–1 (A)		
(German Football Association) TSG Hoffenheim	3–2 (A)			Matchday 7	(Scottish Football Association) Rangers	2–1 (H)		
(Swedish Football Association) IF Elfsborg	3–0 (H)			Matchday 8	(Romanian Football Federation) FCSB	2–0 (A)		
4th place Advanced to round of 16				Final position	3rd place Advanced to round of 16			
Opponent	Agg.	1st leg	2nd leg	Knockout phase	Opponent	Agg.	1st leg	2nd leg
(Royal Dutch Football Association) AZ	3–2	0–1 (A)	3–1 (H)	Round of 16	(Royal Spanish Football Federation) Real Sociedad	5–2	1–1 (A)	4–1 (H)
(German Football Association) Eintracht Frankfurt	2–1	1–1 (H)	1–0 (A)	Quarter-finals	(French Football Federation) Lyon	7–6	2–2 (A)	5–4 (a.e.t.) (H)
(Norwegian Football Federation) Bodø/Glimt	5–1	3–1 (H)	2–0 (A)	Semi-finals	(Royal Spanish Football Federation) Athletic Bilbao	7–1	3–0 (A)	4–1 (H)

== Match ==
=== Summary ===
In a largely scrappy game, Tottenham went in front in the 42nd minute when Pape Matar Sarr crossed from the left which Brennan Johnson got a touch from close range before the ball went into the left corner of the net past André Onana, the final touch appearing to come off the arm of Luke Shaw. In the second half Micky van de Ven acrobatically cleared off the line after a header from Rasmus Højlund with Tottenham goalkeeper Guglielmo Vicario also saving down low to his left from a shot by susbstitute Alejandro Garnacho and a header from Luke Shaw. After seven minutes of added time Tottenham held onto the 1–0 lead to win a first trophy in 17 years. Tottenham became the worst team by domestic league finish to win a European trophy, as they finished 17th in the Premier League.

=== Details ===
The "home" team (for administrative purposes) was predetermined as the winner of semi-final 1 (Tottenham Hotspur).

21 May 2025
21:00 UTC+2

Tottenham Hotspur (The Football Association)	1–0	(The Football Association) Manchester United
Johnson 42'	Report

San Mamés, Bilbao
Attendance: 49,224
Referee: Felix Zwayer (Germany)

Tottenham Hotspur	Manchester United

GK	1	(Italy) Guglielmo Vicario
RB	23	(Spain) Pedro Porro
CB	17	(Argentina) Cristian Romero (c)
CB	37	(Netherlands) Micky van de Ven	(yellow card) 49'
LB	13	(Italy) Destiny Udogie		(substituted off) 90'
CM	29	(Senegal) Pape Matar Sarr		(substituted off) 90'
CM	8	(Mali) Yves Bissouma	(yellow card) 68'
CM	30	(Uruguay) Rodrigo Bentancur
RF	22	(Wales) Brennan Johnson		(substituted off) 78'
CF	19	(England) Dominic Solanke
LF	9	(Brazil) Richarlison	(yellow card) 58'	(substituted off) 67'
Substitutes:
GK	40	(United States) Brandon Austin
GK	41	(England) Alfie Whiteman
DF	4	(Austria) Kevin Danso		(substituted on) 78'
DF	24	(England) Djed Spence		(substituted on) 90'
DF	33	(Wales) Ben Davies
MF	14	(England) Archie Gray		(substituted on) 90'
MF	47	(England) Mikey Moore
FW	7	(South Korea) Son Heung-min		(substituted on) 67'
FW	11	(France) Mathys Tel
FW	28	(France) Wilson Odobert
FW	44	(England) Dane Scarlett
FW	63	(England) Damola Ajayi
Manager:
(Australia) Ange Postecoglou

GK	24	(Cameroon) André Onana
CB	15	(France) Leny Yoro
CB	5	(England) Harry Maguire	(yellow card) 88'
CB	23	(England) Luke Shaw
RM	3	(Morocco) Noussair Mazraoui		(substituted off) 85'
CM	18	(Brazil) Casemiro
CM	8	(Portugal) Bruno Fernandes (c)
LM	13	(Denmark) Patrick Dorgu		(substituted off) 90'
RF	16	(Ivory Coast) Amad Diallo	(yellow card) 35'
CF	9	(Denmark) Rasmus Højlund		(substituted off) 71'
LF	7	(England) Mason Mount		(substituted off) 71'
Substitutes:
GK	1	(Turkey) Altay Bayındır
DF	2	(Sweden) Victor Lindelöf
DF	20	(Portugal) Diogo Dalot		(substituted on) 85'
DF	26	(England) Ayden Heaven
DF	35	(Northern Ireland) Jonny Evans	(yellow card) 90+2'
DF	41	(England) Harry Amass
MF	14	(Denmark) Christian Eriksen
MF	25	(Uruguay) Manuel Ugarte
MF	37	(England) Kobbie Mainoo		(substituted on) 90'
MF	43	(England) Toby Collyer
FW	11	(Netherlands) Joshua Zirkzee	(yellow card) 84'	(substituted on) 71'
FW	17	(Argentina) Alejandro Garnacho		(substituted on) 71'
Manager:
(Portugal) Ruben Amorim

Man of the Match:
Cristian Romero (Tottenham Hotspur)

Assistant referees:
Robert Kempter (Germany)
Christian Dietz (Germany)
Fourth official:
Maurizio Mariani (Italy)
Reserve assistant referee:
Daniele Bindoni (Italy)
Video assistant referee:
Bastian Dankert (Germany)
Assistant video assistant referee:
Benjamin Brand (Germany)
Support video assistant referee:
Carlos del Cerro Grande (Spain)

Match rules

- 90 minutes
- 30 minutes of extra time if necessary
- Penalty shoot-out if scores still level
- Maximum of twelve named substitutes
- Maximum of five substitutions, with a sixth allowed in extra time
- Maximum of three substitution opportunities, with a fourth allowed in extra time

=== Statistics ===
First half
Statistic	Tottenham Hotspur	Manchester United
Goals scored	1	0
Total shots	3	4
Shots on target	1	1
Saves	1	0
Ball possession	43%	57%
Corner kicks	4	2
Fouls committed	12	4
Offsides	0	1
Yellow cards	0	1
Red cards	0	0

Second half
Statistic	Tottenham Hotspur	Manchester United
Goals scored	0	0
Total shots	0	11
Shots on target	0	3
Saves	3	0
Ball possession	29%	71%
Corner kicks	0	3
Fouls committed	10	6
Offsides	1	1
Yellow cards	3	3
Red cards	0	0

Overall
Statistic	Tottenham Hotspur	Manchester United
Goals scored	1	0
Total shots	3	15
Shots on target	1	4
Saves	4	0
Ball possession	35%	65%
Corner kicks	4	5
Fouls committed	22	10
Offsides	1	2
Yellow cards	3	4
Red cards	0	0

== Post-match and aftermath ==
Tottenham Hotspur won their first trophy since winning the 2007–08 Football League Cup, and the first European trophy since prevailing in the 1983–84 UEFA Cup. Tottenham head coach Ange Postecoglou became the first Australian and the first manager from a non-CONMEBOL and UEFA member association country to win a European trophy. Having won the 1999 OFC Club Championship with South Melbourne, he became the first manager to win continental club titles in Europe and outside Europe since Marcello Lippi, who won the 1995–96 UEFA Champions League and 2013 AFC Champions League. Tottenham and South Korean national team captain Son Heung-min became the first European competition-winning captain to hail from the Asia–Pacific. Postecoglou claimed the victory for his team showed he was a serial winner and could transform the North London club. Despite winning Tottenham their first major trophy in 17 years, Postecoglou was sacked by the North London club on 6 June 2025 with the club citing poor domestic league form as the main reason for his dismissal. With Tottenham having finished 17th in the 2024–25 Premier League, one spot above relegation, their Europa League win also made them the European club competition winners with the lowest-ever league finish. The record had previously been held by Inter Milan, who won the 1993–94 UEFA Cup, while being placed 13th in the 1993–94 Serie A.

This was the second time that Manchester United ended a major European final without scoring (2–0 loss to Barcelona in the 2009 UEFA Champions League final), and for only the third time in a European title-deciding match (also 1–0 loss to Lazio in the 1999 UEFA Super Cup). With this defeat, United failed to qualify for the European Cup/UEFA Champions League in two consecutive seasons for the first time since 1992, and for any European competition for only the second time since 1990 (also in 2014–15). This was also the first time United lost four times against Tottenham in the same season. They lost five in the past six meetings between the sides, and United's latest win against Tottenham was in October 2022 as of this final. They also had failed to defeat Tottenham outside of their home at Old Trafford since the 3–0 victory in October 2021. Furthermore, United had failed to defeat or eliminate a fellow English side in Europe since beating Chelsea 1–0 and 2–1 (3–1 on aggregate) in the 2010–11 UEFA Champions League quarter-finals. This also meant that since winning the UEFA Champions League in 2008, United had now lost four of the latest five major European finals they had contested, having lost none of their first four from 1968 to 2008; their only European final victory from 2009 to 2025 was the 2017 UEFA Europa League final. Despite the defeat, United head coach Ruben Amorim insisted his side were the better team throughout the match.

== See also ==
- 2025 UEFA Champions League final
- 2025 UEFA Conference League final
- 2025 UEFA Women's Champions League final
- 2025 UEFA Super Cup
- List of football matches between British clubs in UEFA competitions
- Manchester United F.C. in international football
- Tottenham Hotspur F.C. in European football
- 2024–25 Manchester United F.C. season
- 2024–25 Tottenham Hotspur F.C. season
