= Damir Skomina =

Slovenian football referee

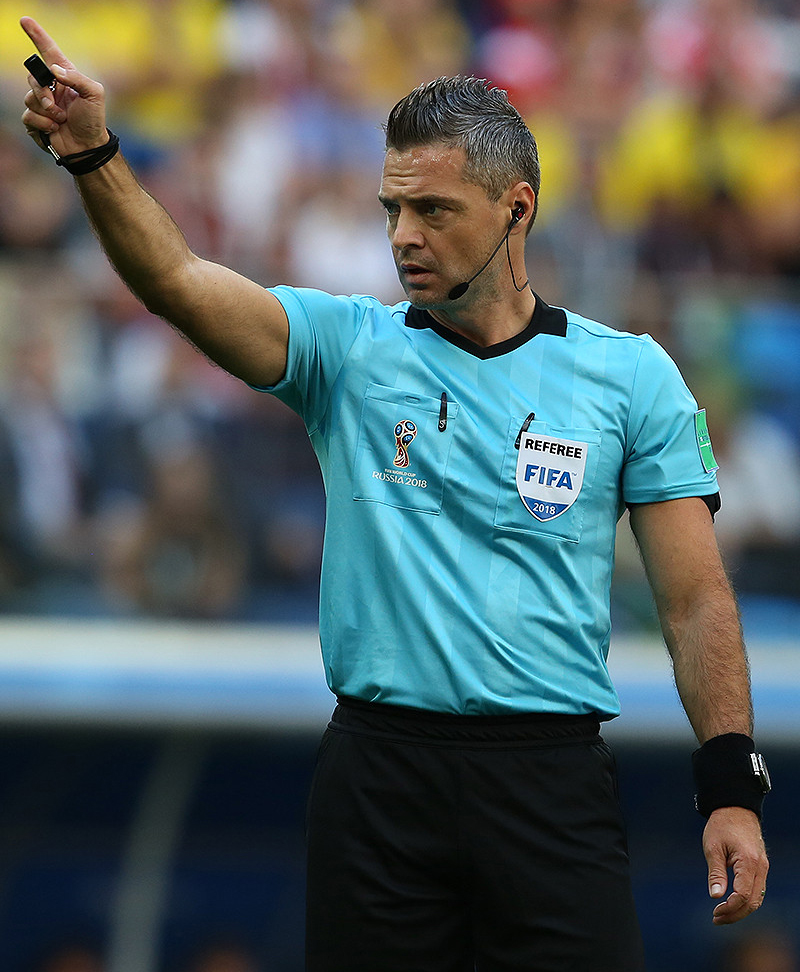
- Skomina officiating a 2018 World Cup match
- Full name: Damir Skomina
- Born: 5 August 1976 (age 50); Koper, SR Slovenia, SFR Yugoslavia

Domestic
Years	League	Role

International
Years	League	Role
2003–2021	FIFA listed	Referee

Damir Skomina (born 5 August 1976) is a Slovenian former UEFA Elite category football referee.

== Refereeing career ==
Skomina was the fourth referee at several UEFA Euro 2008 matches. He refereed the quarter-final match of the football tournament at the 2008 Summer Olympics.

Skomina refereed the second leg of the 2011–12 UEFA Champions League round of 16 match between Arsenal and Milan. He also refereed in the Champions League quarter-final match between Chelsea and Benfica at Stamford Bridge on 4 April 2012.

At UEFA Euro 2012, Skomina refereed three matches: two group matches and a quarterfinal between Germany and Greece. Later that year, he was appointed as a referee at the 2012 UEFA Super Cup between Chelsea and Atlético Madrid.

He was the fourth official in the 2013 UEFA Champions League final.

Skomina was unveiled as the referee for the 2015–16 UEFA Champions League second-leg semi-final fixture between Real Madrid and Manchester City at the Santiago Bernabéu on 4 May 2016.

He refereed four matches at UEFA Euro 2016, including round of 16 fixture between England and Iceland, as well as the quarter-final match between Wales and Belgium.

Skomina was appointed as the referee for the 2017 UEFA Europa League final, between Ajax and Manchester United on 24 May. Later that year, he officiated matches at the 2017 FIFA Confederations Cup. In the opening group B match between Cameroon and Chile, he disallowed a goal by Eduardo Vargas in stoppage in the first half for offside following V.A.R. review; Chilean midfielder Arturo Vidal argued with Skomina over the length of time it took to review the goal, and Chile manager Juan Antonio Pizzi was also critical of V.A.R.'s intervention after the match. Chile won the match 2–0.

On 29 March 2018, FIFA announced that he would officiate matches at 2018 FIFA World Cup along with Jure Praprotnik and Robert Vukan as assistant referees.

On 13 February 2019, he cancelled a goal from Ajax using VAR in the first time of UEFA Champions League history.

Skomina was selected to officiate in the 2019 UEFA Champions League Final between English clubs Tottenham and Liverpool at Metropolitano Stadium in Madrid on 1 June 2019. Skomina awarded Liverpool a penalty kick 20 seconds into the match after Moussa Sissoko stopped a cross by Sadio Mané with his arm with Mohamed Salah scoring the penalty for Liverpool, who went on to win 2–0.

Skomina officiated the iconic 2019–20 UEFA Champions League quarter-final match between Barcelona and Bayern Munich played at the Estádio da Luz in Lisbon, Bayern Munich won the match 8–2, inflicting Barcelona's worst defeat in 69 years.

In August 2021, he retired as referee due to health problems, specifically issues with his knees.

== Selected matches ==
=== Major international competitions ===
UEFA Euro 2012 – Poland and Ukraine
Date	Match	Venue	Location	Round	Result	Yellow cards	Red cards
9 June 2012	Netherlands – Denmark	Metalist Stadium	Kharkiv	Group stage	0–1	3	0
15 June 2012	Sweden – England	Olympic Stadium	Kyiv	Group stage	2–3	4	0
22 June 2012	Germany – Greece	PGE Arena	Gdańsk	Quarter-finals	4–2	2	0
UEFA Euro 2016 – France
Date	Match	Venue	Location	Round	Result	Yellow cards	Red cards
15 June 2016	Russia – Slovakia	Stade Pierre-Mauroy	Villeneuve-d'Ascq	Group stage	1–2	1	0
19 June 2016	Switzerland – France	Stade Pierre-Mauroy	Villeneuve-d'Ascq	Group stage	0–0	2	0
27 June 2016	England – Iceland	Stade de Nice	Nice	Round of 16	1–2	3	0
1 July 2016	Wales – Belgium	Stade Pierre-Mauroy	Villeneuve-d'Ascq	Quarter-finals	3–1	6	0
2018 FIFA World Cup – Russia
Date	Match	Venue	Location	Round	Result	Yellow cards	Red cards
19 June 2018	Colombia – Japan	Mordovia Arena	Samara	Group stage	1–2	3	1
28 June 2018	England – Belgium	Kaliningrad Stadium	Kaliningrad	Group stage	0–1	2	0
3 July 2018	Sweden – Switzerland	Krestovsky Stadium	Saint Petersburg	Round of 16	1–0	3	1

=== Major club competitions ===
Date	Competition	Match	Venue	Location	Round	Result	Yellow cards	Red cards
31 August 2012	2012 UEFA Super Cup	Chelsea – Atlético Madrid	Stade Louis II	Monaco	Final	1–4	1	0
24 May 2017	UEFA Europa League	Ajax – Manchester United	Friends Arena	Solna	Final	0–2	6	0
1 June 2019	UEFA Champions League	Tottenham Hotspur – Liverpool	Estadio Metropolitano	Madrid	Final	0–2	0	0

== Honours ==
- IFFHS World's Best Referee: 2019

Sporting positions
Preceded by (Serbia) Milorad Mažić	UEFA Champions League Final Referee; 2019	Succeeded by (Italy) Daniele Orsato
Preceded by (Sweden) Jonas Eriksson	UEFA Europa League Final Referee; 2017	Succeeded by (Netherlands) Björn Kuipers
