= Manchester United F.C. in international football =

English club in international football

- Club: Manchester United
- Seasons played: 47
- Most appearances: Ryan Giggs (157)
- Top scorer: Wayne Rooney (39)
- First entry: 1956–57 European Cup
- Latest entry: 2026–27 UEFA Champions League

Titles
- Champions League: 3: 1968; 1999; 2008
- Europa League: 1: 2017
- Cup Winners' Cup: 1: 1991
- Super Cup: 1: 1991
- Intercontinental Cup: 1: 1999
- FIFA Club World Cup: 1: 2008

Manchester United Football Club is an English football club based in Old Trafford, Greater Manchester. They were the first English club to participate in a European competition, entering the European Cup in 1956. Since then, the club has competed in every UEFA-organised competition, with the exception of the now-defunct Intertoto Cup and Conference League.

The competition in which Manchester United has had the most success is the European Cup (now known as the UEFA Champions League); they have won three European Cups, the first of which came in 1968; that victory made them the first English club to win the competition. The other two victories came in 1999 and 2008. The club has also won the Europa League in 2017, the Cup Winners' Cup in 1991, the Super Cup also in 1991, the Intercontinental Cup in 1999 and the Club World Cup in 2008.

After their Champions League wins in 1999 and 2008, Manchester United competed as a UEFA representative at the 2000 FIFA Club World Championship and the 2008 FIFA Club World Cup. They were knocked out of the 2000 tournament at the group stage, but went on to win the 2008 edition, highlighted above, becoming the first English side to do so.

== History ==
=== Early years ===
Following their league title win the previous season, Manchester United first competed in European football competition in 1956–57. 1954–55 Football League winners Chelsea had been denied the opportunity to take part in the inaugural European Cup by The Football League's chairman Alan Hardaker, who feared that European football would damage the integrity of the English game. However, Matt Busby, the manager of Manchester United, was a forward-thinking man and was determined to have his team compete on the European stage. With the backing of The Football Association's chairman, Stanley Rous (who would later go on to become the president of FIFA), Manchester United were allowed to compete in the 1956–57 European Cup.

The club's first match in European competition was a European Cup preliminary round tie against Anderlecht at Parc Astrid in Brussels; Manchester United won the match 2–0 in front of 35,000 spectators. The return leg was played at Maine Road, the home of Manchester United's local rivals Manchester City, as United's stadium, Old Trafford, had not yet been fitted with the necessary floodlighting for evening games. The match finished as a 10–0 win for Manchester United, a result that still stands as the club's record win in all competitions. A long run in the European Cup followed, including wins over Borussia Dortmund and Athletic Bilbao and culminating with a semi-final tie against Real Madrid. The first leg took United to the Santiago Bernabéu Stadium, where they were defeated 3–1 in front of a record away crowd of 135,000 spectators. However, they were only able to draw 2–2 in the second leg back at Old Trafford, and the club's first European season came to an end as Real Madrid went on to record the second of their five consecutive European Cup titles.

=== Munich ===
United won the league title again that season, and were therefore eligible to compete in the European Cup for the second consecutive year. After dispatching Shamrock Rovers 9–2 on aggregate in the preliminary round, United were paired with Dukla Prague for the first round. After the second leg in Prague, the team was scheduled to fly back to Manchester the following day, but fog over Manchester prevented this and they were forced to make hasty arrangements to travel back via ferry from the Hook of Holland to Harwich and then by train up to Manchester. This long-winded journey took its toll on the players, who were only able to manage a 1–1 away draw against Birmingham City two days later.

Eager to avoid such a scenario again, the club's management chartered a plane for the quarter-final second leg away to Red Star Belgrade. Following a 2–1 win in the first leg at Old Trafford, a 3–3 draw in Belgrade was enough to secure passage to the semi-finals. On the return flight to Manchester, British European Airways Flight 609 stopped over in a snow-covered Munich for refuelling. Once the refuelling was complete, the pilot was given clearance to take off, only to be halted by a fault with the plane's engine. A second attempt was made a few seconds later, but the same fault kept the plane grounded. Half an hour later, after inspection by the airport's engineers, the plane was given clearance for another take-off attempt. The suggested solution was to have the plane accelerate more slowly, but this meant that the take-off velocity would not be reached until the plane was even further down the runway. Once the plane reached 117 knots – the speed at which it was no longer safe to abort the take-off – the pilot would have expected the plane's velocity to continue to increase; however, there was a sudden drop in velocity and the plane was unable to take off before the end of the runway. It skidded off the end of the runway, through a wire fence and across a road before crashing into a house.

The impact of the crash and the subsequent explosion of fuel killed 21 of the 44 people on board instantly, and another two died in hospital a few days later. Eight of those who died were Manchester United players, among them Duncan Edwards, Roger Byrne and Tommy Taylor, while club secretary Walter Crickmer, trainer Tom Curry and coach Bert Whalley were also killed. Matt Busby was also severely injured, but he made a full recovery after two months in hospital. With eight of the club's first team having been killed in the accident, and several more still recuperating, a threadbare side took to the field for the semi-final matches against Milan. A 2–1 win at Old Trafford in the first leg gave the team hope of a place in the final, but a 4–0 defeat back at the San Siro put paid to those dreams. In honour of those who died, UEFA offered United a berth in the 1958–59 European Cup, drawing them against BSC Young Boys in the preliminary round, but the Football League denied United entry to the competition as they had not won the Football League the previous season after their league campaign crumbled in the aftermath of the disaster. The games against Young Boys went ahead as friendlies.

=== Return to Europe ===
Victory in the 1962–63 FA Cup meant that United returned to European competition after a five-year absence for the 1963–64 Cup Winners' Cup. After sweeping aside Willem II of the Netherlands and the defending champions, England's Tottenham Hotspur, United were drawn against Sporting CP in the quarter-finals. A 4–1 home win in the first leg meant that United needed to avoid defeat by more than three goals at Estádio José Alvalade to progress to the semi-finals; however, the team succumbed to their heaviest defeat in European competition to date, losing 5–0 on the night and 6–4 on aggregate.

A second-place finish in the league in 1963–64 meant that United qualified for the Inter-Cities Fairs Cup in 1964–65. They reached the semi-finals, knocking out Djurgården, Borussia Dortmund, Everton and Strasbourg before losing 2–1 to Ferencváros in a play-off after a 3–3 aggregate draw over two legs.

=== Back in the European Cup ===
The following season saw United return to the European Cup for the first time since Munich after they had beaten Leeds United to top spot in the Football League on goal average. After seeing off Finland's HJK Helsinki and Vorwärts Berlin of East Germany in the first two rounds, Manchester United were drawn against four-time finalists, two-time winners and the previous season's runners-up, Benfica. Benfica's most famous player, the Portuguese international Eusébio, had just been named the European Footballer of the Year and his team went into the tie as favourites. Despite this tag, United ran out 3–2 winners in the first leg at Old Trafford, before beating the Lisbon side 5–1 back at the Estádio da Luz, in what is considered to be the greatest match of George Best's career. The result set up a semi-final tie with Partizan, a tie that would take United back to Belgrade for the first time since the tragedy in Munich. Best had injured his knee in an FA Cup Sixth Round match against Preston North End a couple of weeks before, and although he played in the first leg against Partizan, he was not fully fit and United struggled, losing 2–0 at the JNA Stadium. A goal from Nobby Stiles secured a 1–0 win in the second leg back at Old Trafford, but it was not enough and Matt Busby, believing that his dream of winning the European Cup was over, considered retirement; however, he resolved to win another league title and have one last shot at Europe's biggest prize.

=== First European title ===
Manchester United won the 1966–67 Football League title by four points over Nottingham Forest with a game to spare; this secured their second European Cup appearance in three seasons for 1967–68. After overcoming the Maltese champions, Hibernians, in the first round, United were handed yet another trip to Yugoslavia, this time to take on FK Sarajevo. The Red Devils faced a long journey to Sarajevo for the first leg, and they were held to a 0–0 draw in a very physical match. The second leg was equally robust, but United took control of the tie with goals from John Aston and George Best. Sarajevo were only able to pull back one goal and United went through to the quarter-finals, where they were drawn against Polish side Górnik Zabrze. United won the first leg at Old Trafford 2–0; an own goal from Stefan Florenski put them 1–0 up after an hour, and Brian Kidd doubled their lead in the final minute. The Poles had come to be considered one of the better sides in the last eight, and they were able to come away with a 1–0 win in the second leg, but it was not enough to prevent United from progressing to a semi-final tie with Real Madrid. United's 1–0 win in the first leg at Old Trafford was all that separated the sides after a 3–3 draw at the Bernabéu, setting up a meeting with Benfica in the final at Wembley Stadium. Best was again on the scoresheet, along with two goals from Charlton and one from Kidd on his 19th birthday, as United beat the Portuguese champions 4–1 after extra time to claim their first European trophy.

United reached the semi-finals of the European Cup as holders in the 1968–69 season, but lost to Milan. They would not compete in Europe for another seven years.

=== European comeback ===
Following the retirement of Sir Matt Busby as manager at the end of the 1968–69 season, United entered a barren period that culminated in relegation to the Second Division in 1974. Promotion was achieved at the first attempt under the management of Tommy Docherty, who had taken over in December 1972, and in that first season back in the top flight, United finished third in the league to qualify for the UEFA Cup.

Although United did qualify for the European Cup Winners' Cup as FA Cup winners in 1977 and for the UEFA Cup in 1980 and 1982 with top-five finishes, they failed to make an impact on European competitions until the 1983–84 season, when they qualified for the European Cup Winners' Cup as FA Cup winners under Ron Atkinson. The United squad of this era was arguably the finest of the post-Busby era, containing star players including Ray Wilkins, Bryan Robson, Frank Stapleton and teenage forward Norman Whiteside. United achieved a famous victory over Barcelona in the quarter-finals of the 1983–84 European Cup Winners' Cup, winning the second leg 3–0 at Old Trafford after being beaten 2–0 in Spain in the first leg, made all the more impressive by the fact that Barcelona's team contained Diego Maradona, rated by many as the best footballer in the world at the time.

United reached the quarter-finals of the UEFA Cup in 1984–85, but this would be their last contribution to European football for half a decade; the subsequent Heysel Stadium disaster at the European Cup final, in which rioting by Liverpool fans resulted in the death of 39 spectators and led to a ban on all English clubs in European competitions which would not be lifted in 1990. This resulted in United missing out on qualification for the European Cup Winners' Cup in 1985, and the UEFA Cup in 1986 and 1988. During this exile from Europe, United replaced Ron Atkinson with Alex Ferguson as their manager, and he remained in charge more than a quarter of a century later.

=== 1990s, 2000s and early 2010s: rise to the European elite and Champions League titles ===
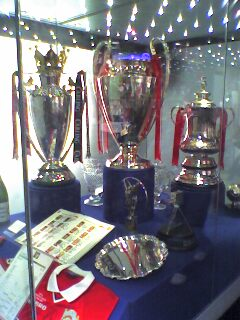
Manchester United won a treble in 1999: the Premier League, Champions League and FA Cup (left to right); the English club also won the 1999 Intercontinental Cup.

When the ban on English clubs in European competitions was lifted for the 1990–91 season, United were England's representatives in the European Cup Winners' Cup, as FA Cup winners, and they marked their return to Europe by winning the competition, with a 2–1 win over Barcelona (by now without Maradona) in the final, in which Mark Hughes scored twice. Their defence of the trophy in the 1991–92 season was short-lived, ending at the hands of Atlético Madrid in the second round, and they lost at the first hurdle in the 1992–93 UEFA Cup.

Winning the Premier League title in 1993 qualified United to play in the newly rebranded UEFA Champions League (formerly the European Cup), their first appearance in Europe's biggest club competition since 1969. United made a disappointing second round exit to Galatasaray on away goals with a 3-3 draw at Old Trafford and a 0-0 draw in a hostile away leg. They failed to make much of an impact in European competitions until the 1996–97 season, when they reached the semi-finals of the Champions League and were beaten by Borussia Dortmund. This campaign in Europe also saw them suffer their first home defeat in a European competition, 40 years after first competing on the continent, losing 1–0 to Turkish side Fenerbahçe in the group stage.

They finally ended a 31-year wait for a second European Cup in 1999 when stoppage-time goals from Teddy Sheringham and Ole Gunnar Solskjær gave them a 2–1 win over Bayern Munich in the final in Barcelona. In 2003–04, United were beaten by Porto in the last 16 of the Champions League, ending a seven-year run of quarter-final appearances in the competitions, which also included one run to the final and a further two to the semi-finals.

After three short-lived Champions League campaigns, United made an impact on the competition in the 2006–07 season. After going down 2–1 in Italy to Roma in the quarter-final first leg, they triumphed 7–1 in the second leg to reach the semi-finals for the first time in five years. They took a 3–2 lead against Milan in the first leg, only for their hopes of an all-English final with Liverpool to be ended by a 3–0 second leg defeat. A year later, however, they won the trophy for the third time, beating fellow English side Chelsea on penalties in Moscow after a 1–1 draw in the first all-English European Cup final.

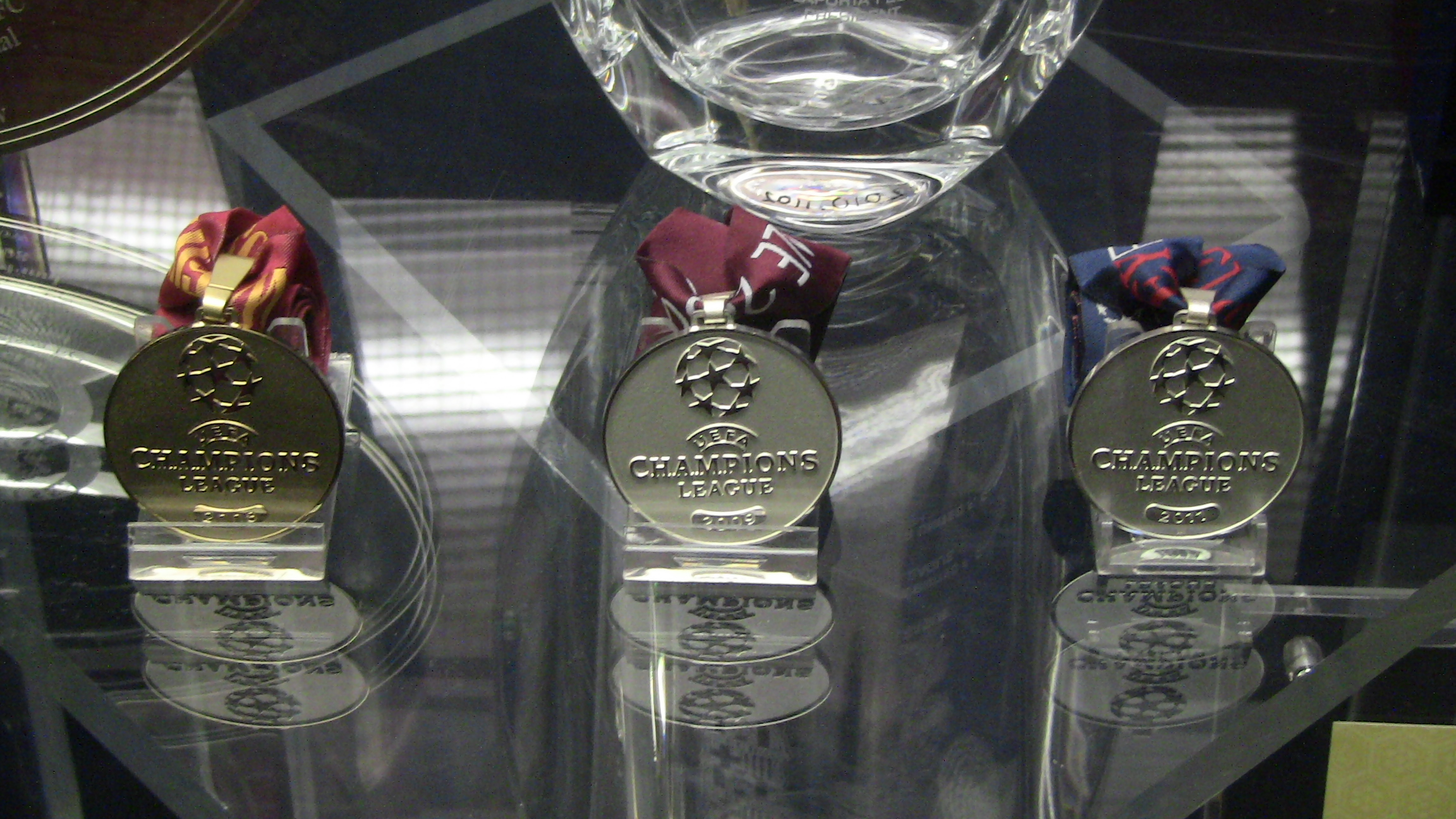
Winners' and runners-up medals from Manchester United's UEFA Champions League final appearances in 2008, 2009 and 2011

United reached a further two European Cup finals in the next three years, but lost to Barcelona on both occasions: first in the 2009 final in Rome, and then in the 2011 final at the new Wembley Stadium in London. Poor performances in the 2011–12 UEFA Champions League group stage saw United finish third, giving them another chance in Europe via the UEFA Europa League. This was the first time United entered the tournament since its rebrand from the UEFA Cup in 2009, in which they last competed in 1995–96. They were eventually knocked out in the round of 16, losing 5–3 on aggregate to Athletic Bilbao.

=== 2010s and 2020s: decline and resurgence ===
After finishing seventh in the Premier League in 2013–14 under David Moyes, United missed out on European football in 2014–15 for the first time in 25 years, but returned to European action the following season after Moyes' replacement Louis van Gaal guided the club to fourth in the league and a place in the Champions League play-off round. It was the first time that Manchester United had played in the qualifying phase of the Champions League since beating Hungarian side Debrecen in the 2005–06 competition.

By virtue of winning the 2015–16 FA Cup (compounded by a fifth-place finish in the Premier League that season), United started their 2016–17 European campaign in the Europa League, the first time since 1995–96. United won the tournament after defeating Ajax 2–0 in the final, giving them their first win of the competition and becoming the fifth club to win all three of UEFA's major titles.

Underperformance in the league has led the club to another Europa League participations in 2019–20, in which United lost to Sevilla in the one-leg semi-final. In the 2020–21 Europa League they lost the final to Villarreal—their first major trophy; United qualified to the competition after a third-place finish in the 2020–21 Champions League group stage, a feat repeated from 2015–16. Since the club last won the league title in 2012–13, they are yet to qualify for the semi-finals of the Champions League. In the 2021–22 Champions League, the Reds topped their group but were knocked out in the round of 16 by Atlético Madrid, losing 2–1 on aggregate. As a result of a sixth-place finish in the 2021–22 Premier League, Manchester United again qualified for the Europa League. United finished second on goals scored in the group stage. They beat Spanish clubs Barcelona in the knockout round play-offs and Real Betis in the round of 16, but were knocked out by eventual winners Sevilla in the quarter-finals. Finishing third in the 2022–23 Premier League, United qualified for the 2023–24 UEFA Champions League. The 2023–24 season would see United suffer a humiliating group stage exit finishing 4th and last in their group being knocked out of European football altogether before Christmas. Despite an eighth place finish in the Premier League United would win the 2024 FA Cup final against local rivals Manchester City to qualify for the Europa League for the following season. In the 2024–25 UEFA Europa League United would go on to reach the final but would suffer a 1–0 defeat in the final in Bilbao to fellow Premier League side Tottenham Hotspur. This defeat, combined with a poor league season where the club finished in the bottom half of the league for the first time since the 1989–90 season, meant United would not compete in any European competition for the 2025–26 season, meaning United would be absent from UEFA competition altogether for the first time since the 2014–15 season.

== Matches ==
Season	Competition	Round	Opposition	Home (Note: Manchester United score listed first)	Away	Aggregate
1956–57	European Cup	Preliminary round	(Belgium) Anderlecht	10–0	2–0	12–0
1956–57	European Cup	First round	(West Germany) Borussia Dortmund	3–2	0–0	3–2
1956–57	European Cup	Quarter-final	(Spain) Athletic Bilbao	3–0	3–5	6–5
1956–57	European Cup	Semi-final	(Spain) Real Madrid	2–2	1–3	3–5
1957–58	European Cup	Preliminary round	(Republic of Ireland) Shamrock Rovers	3–2	6–0	9–2
1957–58	European Cup	First round	(Czechoslovakia) Dukla Prague	3–0	0–1	3–1
1957–58	European Cup	Quarter-final	(Socialist Federal Republic of Yugoslavia) Red Star Belgrade	2–1	3–3	5–4
1957–58	European Cup	Semi-final	(Italy) Milan	2–1	0–4	2–5
1958–59	European Cup	Preliminary round	(Switzerland) Young Boys	Withdrawn by the Football League		
1963–64	Cup Winners' Cup	First round	(Netherlands) Willem II	6–1	1–1	7–2
1963–64	Cup Winners' Cup	Second round	(England) Tottenham Hotspur	4–1	0–2	4–3
1963–64	Cup Winners' Cup	Quarter-final	(Portugal) Sporting CP	4–1	0–5	4–6
1964–65	Inter-Cities Fairs Cup	First round	(Sweden) Djurgårdens IF	6–1	1–1	7–2
1964–65	Inter-Cities Fairs Cup	Second round	(West Germany) Borussia Dortmund	4–0	6–1	10–1
1964–65	Inter-Cities Fairs Cup	Third round	(England) Everton	2–1	1–1	3–2
1964–65	Inter-Cities Fairs Cup	Quarter-final	(France) Strasbourg	0–0	5–0	5–0
1964–65	Inter-Cities Fairs Cup	Semi-final	(Hungary) Ferencváros	3–2	0–1	3–3 (po 1–2) (A)
1965–66	European Cup	Preliminary round	(Finland) HJK	6–0	3–2	9–2
1965–66	European Cup	First round	(East Germany) Vorwärts Berlin	3–1	2–0	5–1
1965–66	European Cup	Quarter-final	(Portugal) Benfica	3–2	5–1	8–3
1965–66	European Cup	Semi-final	(Socialist Federal Republic of Yugoslavia) Partizan	1–0	0–2	1–2
1967–68	European Cup	First round	(Malta) Hibernians	4–0	0–0	4–0
1967–68	European Cup	Second round	(Socialist Federal Republic of Yugoslavia) Sarajevo	2–1	0–0	2–1
1967–68	European Cup	Quarter-final	(Poland) Górnik Zabrze	2–0	0–1	2–1
1967–68	European Cup	Semi-final	(Spain) Real Madrid	1–0	3–3	4–3
1967–68	European Cup	Final	(Portugal) Benfica	4–1 (a.e.t.) (N)		
1968	Intercontinental Cup	Final	(Argentina) Estudiantes	1–1	0–1	1–2
1968–69	European Cup	First round	(Republic of Ireland) Waterford	7–1	3–1	10–2
1968–69	European Cup	Second round	(Belgium) Anderlecht	3–0	1–3	4–3
1968–69	European Cup	Quarter-final	(Austria) Rapid Wien	3–0	0–0	3–0
1968–69	European Cup	Semi-final	(Italy) Milan	1–0	0–2	1–2
1976–77	UEFA Cup	First round	(Netherlands) Ajax	2–0	0–1	2–1
1976–77	UEFA Cup	Second round	(Italy) Juventus	1–0	0–3	1–3
1977–78	Cup Winners' Cup	First round	(France) Saint-Étienne	2–0	1–1	3–1
1977–78	Cup Winners' Cup	Second round	(Portugal) Porto	5–2	0–4	5–6
1980–81	UEFA Cup	First round	(Poland) Widzew Łódź	1–1	0–0	1–1 (Note: Lost on away goals)
1982–83	UEFA Cup	First round	(Spain) Valencia	0–0	1–2	1–2
1983–84	Cup Winners' Cup	First round	(Czechoslovakia) Dukla Prague	1–1	2–2	3–3 (Note: Won on away goals)
1983–84	Cup Winners' Cup	Second round	(Bulgaria) Spartak Varna	2–0	2–1	4–1
1983–84	Cup Winners' Cup	Quarter-final	(Spain) Barcelona	3–0	0–2	3–2
1983–84	Cup Winners' Cup	Semi-final	(Italy) Juventus	1–1	1–2	2–3
1984–85	UEFA Cup	First round	(Hungary) Rába ETO Győr	3–0	2–2	5–2
1984–85	UEFA Cup	Second round	(Netherlands) PSV Eindhoven	0–0	1–0	1–0
1984–85	UEFA Cup	Third round	(Scotland) Dundee United	2–2	3–2	5–4
1984–85	UEFA Cup	Quarter-final	(Hungary) Videoton	1–0	0–1	1–1 (Note: Lost 4–5 on penalties)
1985–86	Cup Winners' Cup	First round	(Portugal) Benfica	Banned		
1986–87	UEFA Cup	Banned				
1988–89	UEFA Cup	Banned				
1990–91	Cup Winners' Cup	First round	(Hungary) Pécsi Munkás	2–0	1–0	3–0
1990–91	Cup Winners' Cup	Second round	(Wales) Wrexham	3–0	2–0	5–0
1990–91	Cup Winners' Cup	Quarter-final	(France) Montpellier	1–1	2–0	3–1
1990–91	Cup Winners' Cup	Semi-final	(Poland) Legia Warsaw	1–1	3–1	4–2
1990–91	Cup Winners' Cup	Final	(Spain) Barcelona	2–1 (N)		
1991	Super Cup	Final	(Socialist Federal Republic of Yugoslavia) Red Star Belgrade	1–0 (H)		
1991–92	Cup Winners' Cup	First round	(Greece) Athinaikos	2–0	0–0	2–0
1991–92	Cup Winners' Cup	Second round	(Spain) Atlético Madrid	1–1	0–3	1–4
1992–93	UEFA Cup	First round	(Russia) Torpedo Moscow	0–0	0–0	0–0 (Note: Lost 3–4 on penalties)
1993–94	Champions League	First round	(Hungary) Kispest Honvéd	2–1	3–2	5–3
1993–94	Champions League	Second round	(Turkey) Galatasaray	3–3	0–0	3–3
1994–95	Champions League	Group A	(Sweden) IFK Göteborg	4–2	1–3	3rd
1994–95	Champions League	Group A	(Turkey) Galatasaray	4–0	0–0	3rd
1994–95	Champions League	Group A	(Spain) Barcelona	2–2	0–4	3rd
1995–96	UEFA Cup	First round	(Russia) Rotor Volgograd	2–2	0–0	2–2
1996–97	Champions League	Group C	(Italy) Juventus	0–1	0–1	2nd
1996–97	Champions League	Group C	(Austria) Rapid Wien	2–0	2–0	2nd
1996–97	Champions League	Group C	(Turkey) Fenerbahçe	0–1	2–0	2nd
1996–97	Champions League	Quarter-final	(Portugal) Porto	4–0	0–0	4–0
1996–97	Champions League	Semi-final	(Germany) Borussia Dortmund	0–1	0–1	0–2
1997–98	Champions League	Group B	(Slovakia) Košice	3–0	3–0	1st
1997–98	Champions League	Group B	(Italy) Juventus	3–2	0–1	1st
1997–98	Champions League	Group B	(Netherlands) Feyenoord	2–1	3–1	1st
1997–98	Champions League	Quarter-final	(France) Monaco	1–1	0–0	1–1
1998–99	Champions League	Second qualifying round	(Poland) ŁKS Łódź	2–0	0–0	2–0
1998–99	Champions League	Group D	(Spain) Barcelona	3–3	3–3	2nd
1998–99	Champions League	Group D	(Germany) Bayern Munich	1–1	2–2	2nd
1998–99	Champions League	Group D	(Denmark) Brøndby	5–0	6–2	2nd
1998–99	Champions League	Quarter-final	(Italy) Inter Milan	2–0	1–1	3–1
1998–99	Champions League	Semi-final	(Italy) Juventus	1–1	3–2	4–3
1998–99	Champions League	Final	(Germany) Bayern Munich	2–1 (N)		
1999	Super Cup	Final	(Italy) Lazio	0–1 (N)		
1999	Intercontinental Cup	Final	(Brazil) Palmeiras	1–0 (N)		
2000	Club World Championship	Group B	(Mexico) Necaxa	1–1 (N)		3rd
2000	Club World Championship	Group B	(Brazil) Vasco da Gama	1–3 (N)		3rd
2000	Club World Championship	Group B	(Australia) South Melbourne	2–0 (N)		3rd
1999–2000	Champions League	First group round Group D	Croatia Zagreb	0–0	2–1	1st
1999–2000	Champions League	First group round Group D	(Austria) Sturm Graz	2–1	3–0	1st
1999–2000	Champions League	First group round Group D	(France) Marseille	2–1	0–1	1st
1999–2000	Champions League	Second group round Group B	(Italy) Fiorentina	3–1	0–2	1st
1999–2000	Champions League	Second group round Group B	(Spain) Valencia	3–0	0–0	1st
1999–2000	Champions League	Second group round Group B	(France) Bordeaux	2–0	2–1	1st
1999–2000	Champions League	Quarter-final	(Spain) Real Madrid	2–3	0–0	2–3
2000–01	Champions League	First group round Group G	(Belgium) Anderlecht	5–1	1–2	2nd
2000–01	Champions League	First group round Group G	(Ukraine) Dynamo Kyiv	1–0	0–0	2nd
2000–01	Champions League	First group round Group G	(Netherlands) PSV Eindhoven	3–1	1–3	2nd
2000–01	Champions League	Second group round Group A	(Greece) Panathinaikos	3–1	1–1	2nd
2000–01	Champions League	Second group round Group A	(Austria) Sturm Graz	3–0	2–0	2nd
2000–01	Champions League	Second group round Group A	(Spain) Valencia	1–1	0–0	2nd
2000–01	Champions League	Quarter-final	(Germany) Bayern Munich	0–1	1–2	1–3
2001–02	Champions League	First group round Group G	(France) Lille	1–0	1–1	2nd
2001–02	Champions League	First group round Group G	(Spain) Deportivo La Coruña	2–3	1–2	2nd
2001–02	Champions League	First group round Group G	(Greece) Olympiacos	3–0	2–0	2nd
2001–02	Champions League	Second group round Group A	(Germany) Bayern Munich	0–0	1–1	1st
2001–02	Champions League	Second group round Group A	(Portugal) Boavista	3–0	3–0	1st
2001–02	Champions League	Second group round Group A	(France) Nantes	5–1	1–1	1st
2001–02	Champions League	Quarter-final	(Spain) Deportivo La Coruña	3–2	2–0	5–2
2001–02	Champions League	Semi-final	(Germany) Bayer Leverkusen	2–2	1–1	3–3
2002–03	Champions League	Third qualifying round	(Hungary) Zalaegerszeg	5–0	0–1	5–1
2002–03	Champions League	First group round Group F	(Israel) Maccabi Haifa	5–2	0–3	1st
2002–03	Champions League	First group round Group F	(Germany) Bayer Leverkusen	2–0	2–1	1st
2002–03	Champions League	First group round Group F	(Greece) Olympiacos	4–0	3–2	1st
2002–03	Champions League	Second group round Group D	(Switzerland) Basel	1–1	3–1	1st
2002–03	Champions League	Second group round Group D	(Spain) Deportivo La Coruña	2–0	0–2	1st
2002–03	Champions League	Second group round Group D	(Italy) Juventus	2–1	3–0	1st
2002–03	Champions League	Quarter-final	(Spain) Real Madrid	4–3	1–3	5–6
2003–04	Champions League	Group E	(Greece) Panathinaikos	5–0	1–0	1st
2003–04	Champions League	Group E	(Germany) VfB Stuttgart	2–0	1–2	1st
2003–04	Champions League	Group E	(Scotland) Rangers	3–0	1–0	1st
2003–04	Champions League	Round of 16	(Portugal) Porto	1–1	1–2	2–3
2004–05	Champions League	Third qualifying round	(Romania) Dinamo București	3–0	2–1	5–1
2004–05	Champions League	Group D	(France) Lyon	2–1	2–2	2nd
2004–05	Champions League	Group D	(Turkey) Fenerbahçe	6–2	0–3	2nd
2004–05	Champions League	Group D	(Czech Republic) Sparta Prague	0–0	4–1	2nd
2004–05	Champions League	Round of 16	(Italy) Milan	0–1	0–1	0–2
2005–06	Champions League	Third qualifying round	(Hungary) Debrecen	3–0	3–0	6–0
2005–06	Champions League	Group D	(Spain) Villarreal	0–0	0–0	4th
2005–06	Champions League	Group D	(Portugal) Benfica	2–1	1–2	4th
2005–06	Champions League	Group D	(France) Lille	0–0	0–1	4th
2006–07	Champions League	Group F	(Scotland) Celtic	3–2	0–1	1st
2006–07	Champions League	Group F	(Portugal) Benfica	3–1	1–0	1st
2006–07	Champions League	Group F	(Denmark) Copenhagen	3–0	0–1	1st
2006–07	Champions League	Round of 16	(France) Lille	1–0	1–0	2–0
2006–07	Champions League	Quarter-final	(Italy) Roma	7–1	1–2	8–3
2006–07	Champions League	Semi-final	(Italy) Milan	3–2	0–3	3–5
2007–08	Champions League	Group F	(Portugal) Sporting CP	2–1	1–0	1st
2007–08	Champions League	Group F	(Italy) Roma	1–0	1–1	1st
2007–08	Champions League	Group F	(Ukraine) Dynamo Kyiv	4–2	4–0	1st
2007–08	Champions League	Round of 16	(France) Lyon	1–0	1–1	2–1
2007–08	Champions League	Quarter-final	(Italy) Roma	1–0	2–0	3–0
2007–08	Champions League	Semi-final	(Spain) Barcelona	1–0	0–0	1–0
2007–08	Champions League	Final	(England) Chelsea	1–1 (a.e.t.) (N) (Note: Won 6–5 on penalties)		
2008	Super Cup	Final	(Russia) Zenit Saint Petersburg	1–2 (N)		
2008	Club World Cup	Semi-final	(Japan) Gamba Osaka	5–3 (N)		
2008	Club World Cup	Final	(Ecuador) LDU Quito	1–0 (N)		
2008–09	Champions League	Group E	(Spain) Villarreal	0–0	0–0	1st
2008–09	Champions League	Group E	(Denmark) Aalborg BK	2–2	3–0	1st
2008–09	Champions League	Group E	(Scotland) Celtic	3–0	1–1	1st
2008–09	Champions League	Round of 16	(Italy) Inter Milan	2–0	0–0	2–0
2008–09	Champions League	Quarter-final	(Portugal) Porto	2–2	1–0	3–2
2008–09	Champions League	Semi-final	(England) Arsenal	1–0	3–1	4–1
2008–09	Champions League	Final	(Spain) Barcelona	0–2 (N)		
2009–10	Champions League	Group B	(Turkey) Beşiktaş	0–1	1–0	1st
2009–10	Champions League	Group B	(Germany) VfL Wolfsburg	2–1	3–1	1st
2009–10	Champions League	Group B	(Russia) CSKA Moscow	3–3	1–0	1st
2009–10	Champions League	Round of 16	(Italy) Milan	4–0	3–2	7–2
2009–10	Champions League	Quarter-final	(Germany) Bayern Munich	3–2	1–2	4–4
2010–11	Champions League	Group C	(Scotland) Rangers	0–0	1–0	1st
2010–11	Champions League	Group C	(Spain) Valencia	1–1	1–0	1st
2010–11	Champions League	Group C	(Turkey) Bursaspor	1–0	3–0	1st
2010–11	Champions League	Round of 16	(France) Marseille	2–1	0–0	2–1
2010–11	Champions League	Quarter-final	(England) Chelsea	2–1	1–0	3–1
2010–11	Champions League	Semi-final	(Germany) Schalke 04	4–1	2–0	6–1
2010–11	Champions League	Final	(Spain) Barcelona	1–3 (N)		
2011–12	Champions League	Group C	(Portugal) Benfica	2–2	1–1	3rd
2011–12	Champions League	Group C	(Switzerland) Basel	3–3	1–2	3rd
2011–12	Champions League	Group C	(Romania) Oțelul Galați	2–0	2–0	3rd
2011–12	Europa League	Round of 32	(Netherlands) Ajax	1–2	2–0	3–2
2011–12	Europa League	Round of 16	(Spain) Athletic Bilbao	2–3	1–2	3–5
2012–13	Champions League	Group H	(Turkey) Galatasaray	1–0	0–1	1st
2012–13	Champions League	Group H	(Romania) CFR Cluj	0–1	2–1	1st
2012–13	Champions League	Group H	(Portugal) Braga	3–2	3–1	1st
2012–13	Champions League	Round of 16	(Spain) Real Madrid	1–2	1–1	2–3
2013–14	Champions League	Group A	(Germany) Bayer Leverkusen	4–2	5–0	1st
2013–14	Champions League	Group A	(Ukraine) Shakhtar Donetsk	1–0	1–1	1st
2013–14	Champions League	Group A	(Spain) Real Sociedad	1–0	0–0	1st
2013–14	Champions League	Round of 16	(Greece) Olympiacos	3–0	0–2	3–2
2013–14	Champions League	Quarter-final	(Germany) Bayern Munich	1–1	1–3	2–4
2015–16	Champions League	Play-off round	(Belgium) Club Brugge	3–1	4–0	7–1
2015–16	Champions League	Group B	(Netherlands) PSV Eindhoven	0–0	1–2	3rd
2015–16	Champions League	Group B	(Germany) VfL Wolfsburg	2–1	2–3	3rd
2015–16	Champions League	Group B	(Russia) CSKA Moscow	1–0	1–1	3rd
2015–16	Europa League	Round of 32	(Denmark) Midtjylland	5–1	1–2	6–3
2015–16	Europa League	Round of 16	(England) Liverpool	1–1	0–2	1–3
2016–17	Europa League	Group A	(Turkey) Fenerbahçe	4–1	1–2	2nd
2016–17	Europa League	Group A	(Netherlands) Feyenoord	4–0	0–1	2nd
2016–17	Europa League	Group A	(Ukraine) Zorya Luhansk	1–0	2–0	2nd
2016–17	Europa League	Round of 32	(France) Saint-Étienne	3–0	1–0	4–0
2016–17	Europa League	Round of 16	(Russia) Rostov	1–0	1–1	2–1
2016–17	Europa League	Quarter-final	(Belgium) Anderlecht	2–1 (a.e.t.)	1–1	3–2
2016–17	Europa League	Semi-final	(Spain) Celta Vigo	1–1	1–0	2–1
2016–17	Europa League	Final	(Netherlands) Ajax	2–0 (N)		
2017	Super Cup	Final	(Spain) Real Madrid	1–2 (N)		
2017–18	Champions League	Group A	(Switzerland) Basel	3–0	0–1	1st
2017–18	Champions League	Group A	(Russia) CSKA Moscow	2–1	4–1	1st
2017–18	Champions League	Group A	(Portugal) Benfica	2–0	1–0	1st
2017–18	Champions League	Round of 16	(Spain) Sevilla	1–2	0–0	1–2
2018–19	Champions League	Group H	(Switzerland) Young Boys	1–0	3–0	2nd
2018–19	Champions League	Group H	(Spain) Valencia	0–0	1–2	2nd
2018–19	Champions League	Group H	(Italy) Juventus	0–1	2–1	2nd
2018–19	Champions League	Round of 16	(France) Paris Saint-Germain	0–2	3–1	3–3
2018–19	Champions League	Quarter-final	(Spain) Barcelona	0–1	0–3	0–4
2019–20	Europa League	Group L	(Kazakhstan) Astana	1–0	1–2	1st
2019–20	Europa League	Group L	(Netherlands) AZ	4–0	0–0	1st
2019–20	Europa League	Group L	(Serbia) Partizan	3–0	1–0	1st
2019–20	Europa League	Round of 32	(Belgium) Club Brugge	5–0	1–1	6–1
2019–20	Europa League	Round of 16	(Austria) LASK	2–1	5–0	7–1
2019–20	Europa League	Quarter-final	(Denmark) Copenhagen	1–0 (a.e.t.) (N)		
2019–20	Europa League	Semi-final	(Spain) Sevilla	1–2 (N)		
2020–21	Champions League	Group H	(France) Paris Saint-Germain	1–3	2–1	3rd
2020–21	Champions League	Group H	(Germany) RB Leipzig	5–0	2–3	3rd
2020–21	Champions League	Group H	(Turkey) İstanbul Başakşehir	4–1	1–2	3rd
2020–21	Europa League	Round of 32	(Spain) Real Sociedad	0–0	4–0	4–0
2020–21	Europa League	Round of 16	(Italy) Milan	1–1	1–0	2–1
2020–21	Europa League	Quarter-final	(Spain) Granada	2–0	2–0	4–0
2020–21	Europa League	Semi-final	(Italy) Roma	6–2	2–3	8–5
2020–21	Europa League	Final	(Spain) Villarreal	1–1 (a.e.t.) (N) (Note: Lost 10–11 on penalties)		
2021–22	Champions League	Group F	(Switzerland) Young Boys	1–1	1–2	1st
2021–22	Champions League	Group F	(Spain) Villarreal	2–1	2–0	1st
2021–22	Champions League	Group F	(Italy) Atalanta	3–2	2–2	1st
2021–22	Champions League	Round of 16	(Spain) Atlético Madrid	0–1	1–1	1–2
2022–23	Europa League	Group E	(Spain) Real Sociedad	0–1	1–0	2nd
2022–23	Europa League	Group E	(Moldova) Sheriff Tiraspol	3–0	2–0	2nd
2022–23	Europa League	Group E	(Cyprus) Omonia	1–0	3–2	2nd
2022–23	Europa League	Knockout round play-offs	(Spain) Barcelona	2–1	2–2	4–3
2022–23	Europa League	Round of 16	(Spain) Real Betis	4–1	1–0	5–1
2022–23	Europa League	Quarter-final	(Spain) Sevilla	2–2	0–3	2–5
2023–24	Champions League	Group A	(Germany) Bayern Munich	0–1	3–4	4th
2023–24	Champions League	Group A	(Denmark) Copenhagen	1–0	3–4	4th
2023–24	Champions League	Group A	(Turkey) Galatasaray	2–3	3–3	4th
2024–25	Europa League	League phase	(Netherlands) Twente	1–1	—N/a	3rd
2024–25	Europa League	League phase	(Portugal) Porto	—N/a	3–3	3rd
2024–25	Europa League	League phase	(Turkey) Fenerbahçe	—N/a	1–1	3rd
2024–25	Europa League	League phase	(Greece) PAOK	2–0	—N/a	3rd
2024–25	Europa League	League phase	(Norway) Bodø/Glimt	3–2	—N/a	3rd
2024–25	Europa League	League phase	(Czech Republic) Viktoria Plzeň	—N/a	2–1	3rd
2024–25	Europa League	League phase	(Scotland) Rangers	2–1	—N/a	3rd
2024–25	Europa League	League phase	(Romania) FCSB	—N/a	2–0	3rd
2024–25	Europa League	Round of 16	(Spain) Real Sociedad	4–1	1–1	5–2
2024–25	Europa League	Quarter-final	(France) Lyon	5–4 (a.e.t.)	2–2	7–6
2024–25	Europa League	Semi-final	(Spain) Athletic Bilbao	4–1	3–0	7–1
2024–25	Europa League	Final	(England) Tottenham Hotspur	0–1 (N)		
2026–27	Champions League	League phase	(Azerbaijan) Sabah	4–0	—N/a	
2026–27	Champions League	League phase	(Spain) Atlético Madrid	—N/a	0–2	
2026–27	Champions League	League phase	(Italy) Como	—N/a	1–4	
2026–27	Champions League	League phase	(Italy) Roma	3–2	—N/a	
2026–27	Champions League	League phase	(Portugal) Sporting CP	—N/a		
2026–27	Champions League	League phase	(Germany) RB Leipzig		—N/a	
2026–27	Champions League	League phase	(Germany) Bayern Munich		—N/a	
2026–27	Champions League	League phase	(Spain) Villarreal	—N/a		

== Overall record ==
=== By competition ===
As of 4 November 2026

Competition	Pld	W	D	L	GF	GA	GD	Win% (Note: Win% is rounded to two decimal places)	Ref.
Champions League / European Cup	303	163	70	70	553	307	+246	53.80	
Cup Winners' Cup	31	16	9	6	55	35	+20	51.61	
Europa League / UEFA Cup	91	48	26	17	157	81	+76	52.75	
Inter-Cities Fairs Cup	11	6	3	2	29	10	+19	54.55	
Super Cup	4	1	0	3	3	5	−2	25.00	
Intercontinental Cup	3	1	1	1	2	2	+0	33.33	
Club World Cup	5	3	1	1	10	7	+3	60.00	
Total	448	238	110	100	809	447	+362	53.13	

=== By country ===
As of 4 November 2026

Country	Pld	W	D	L	GF	GA	GD	Win%	Ref
Argentina	2	0	1	1	1	2	−1	0.00	
Australia	1	1	0	0	2	0	+2	100.00	
Austria	10	9	1	0	24	2	+22	90.00	
Azerbaijan	1	1	0	0	4	0	+4	100.00	
Belgium	12	8	2	2	38	10	+28	66.67	
Bosnia and Herzegovina	2	1	1	0	2	1	+1	50.00	
Brazil	2	1	0	1	2	3	−1	50.00	
Bulgaria	2	2	0	0	4	1	+3	100.00	
Croatia	2	1	1	0	2	1	+1	50.00	
Cyprus	2	2	0	0	4	2	+2	100.00	
Czech Republic / Czechoslovakia	7	3	3	1	12	6	+6	42.86	
Denmark	11	7	1	3	30	12	+18	63.64	
East Germany	2	2	0	0	5	1	+4	100.00	
Ecuador	1	1	0	0	1	0	+1	100.00	
England	12	6	3	3	16	12	+4	50.00	
Finland	2	2	0	0	9	2	+7	100.00	
France	34	18	12	4	53	28	+25	52.94	
Germany / West Germany	35	16	8	11	70	44	+26	45.71	
Greece	13	10	2	1	29	6	+23	76.92	
Hungary	15	10	1	4	29	12	+17	66.67	
Ireland	4	4	0	0	19	4	+15	100.00	
Israel	2	1	0	1	5	5	+0	50.00	
Italy	45	22	7	16	70	58	+12	48.89	
Japan	1	1	0	0	5	3	+2	100.00	
Kazakhstan	2	1	0	1	2	2	+0	50.00	
Malta	2	1	1	0	4	0	+4	50.00	
Mexico	1	0	1	0	1	1	+0	0.00	
Moldova	2	2	0	0	5	0	+5	100.00	
Netherlands	20	10	5	5	34	15	+19	50.00	
Norway	1	1	0	0	3	2	+1	100.00	
Poland	8	3	4	1	9	4	+5	37.50	
Portugal	28	18	6	4	61	35	+26	64.29	
Romania	7	6	0	1	13	3	+10	85.71	
Russia	13	5	7	1	17	11	+6	38.46	
Scotland	11	7	3	1	19	9	+10	63.64	
Serbia	7	5	1	1	11	6	+5	71.43	
Slovakia	2	2	0	0	6	0	+6	100.00	
Spain	79	25	28	26	103	99	+4	31.65	
Sweden	4	2	1	1	12	7	+5	50.00	
Switzerland	10	4	3	3	17	11	+6	40.00	
Turkey	21	9	5	7	37	24	+13	42.86	
Ukraine	8	6	2	0	14	3	+11	75.00	
Wales	2	2	0	0	5	0	+5	100.00	

=== By club ===
As of 4 November 2026

Opponent	Played	Won	Drawn	Lost	For	Against	Difference	Win %
(Denmark) Aalborg BK	2	1	1	0	5	2	+3	50.00
(Netherlands) Ajax	5	3	0	2	7	3	+4	60.00
(Belgium) Anderlecht	8	5	1	2	25	8	+17	62.50
(England) Arsenal	2	2	0	0	4	1	+3	100.00
(Kazakhstan) Astana	2	1	0	1	2	2	+0	50.00
(Italy) Atalanta	2	1	1	0	5	4	+1	50.00
(Greece) Athinaikos	2	1	1	0	2	0	+2	50.00
(Spain) Athletic Bilbao	6	3	0	3	16	11	+5	50.00
(Spain) Atlético Madrid	5	0	2	3	2	8	−6	0.00
(Netherlands) AZ	2	1	1	0	4	0	+4	50.00
(Spain) Barcelona	15	4	5	6	19	27	−8	26.67
(Switzerland) Basel	6	2	2	2	11	8	+3	33.33
(Germany) Bayer Leverkusen	6	4	2	0	16	6	+10	66.67
(Germany) Bayern Munich	13	2	5	6	16	21	−5	15.38
(Portugal) Benfica	11	8	2	1	25	11	+14	72.73
(Turkey) Beşiktaş	2	1	0	1	1	1	+0	50.00
(Portugal) Boavista	2	2	0	0	6	0	+6	100.00
(Norway) Bodø/Glimt	1	1	0	0	3	2	+1	100.00
(France) Bordeaux	2	2	0	0	3	0	+3	100.00
(Germany) Borussia Dortmund	6	3	1	2	13	5	+8	50.00
(Portugal) Braga	2	2	0	0	6	3	+3	100.00
(Denmark) Brøndby	2	2	0	0	11	2	+9	100.00
(Hungary) Budapest Honvéd	2	2	0	0	5	3	+2	100.00
(Turkey) Bursaspor	2	2	0	0	4	0	+4	100.00
(Spain) Celta Vigo	2	1	1	0	2	1	+1	50.00
(Scotland) Celtic	4	2	1	1	7	4	+3	50.00
(Romania) CFR Cluj	2	1	0	1	2	2	+0	50.00
(England) Chelsea	3	2	1	0	4	2	+2	66.67
(Belgium) Club Brugge	4	3	1	0	13	2	+11	75.00
(Italy) Como	1	0	0	1	1	4	−3	0.00
(Denmark) Copenhagen	5	3	0	2	8	5	+3	60.00
(Russia) CSKA Moscow	6	4	2	0	12	6	+6	66.67
(Hungary) Debrecen	2	2	0	0	6	0	+6	100.00
(Spain) Deportivo La Coruña	6	3	0	3	10	9	+1	50.00
(Romania) Dinamo București	2	2	0	0	5	1	+4	100.00
(Croatia) Dinamo Zagreb	2	1	1	0	2	1	+1	50.00
(Sweden) Djurgårdens IF	2	1	1	0	7	2	+5	50.00
(Czech Republic) Dukla Prague	4	1	2	1	6	4	+2	25.00
(Scotland) Dundee United	2	1	1	0	5	4	+1	50.00
(Ukraine) Dynamo Kyiv	4	3	1	0	9	2	+7	75.00
(Argentina) Estudiantes	2	0	1	1	1	2	−1	0.00
(England) Everton	2	1	1	0	3	2	+1	50.00
(Romania) FCSB	1	1	0	0	2	0	+2	100.00
(Turkey) Fenerbahçe	7	3	1	3	14	10	+4	42.86
(Hungary) Ferencváros	3	1	0	2	4	5	−1	33.33
(Netherlands) Feyenoord	4	3	0	1	9	3	+6	75.00
(Italy) Fiorentina	2	1	0	1	3	3	+0	50.00
(Turkey) Galatasaray	8	2	4	2	13	10	+3	25.00
(Japan) Gamba Osaka	1	1	0	0	5	3	+2	100.00
(Poland) Górnik Zabrze	2	1	0	1	2	1	+1	50.00
(Sweden) IFK Göteborg	2	1	0	1	5	5	+0	50.00
(Spain) Granada	2	2	0	0	4	0	+4	100.00
(Hungary) Győri ETO	2	1	1	0	5	2	+3	50.00
(Finland) HJK	2	2	0	0	9	2	+7	100.00
(Malta) Hibernians	2	1	1	0	4	0	+4	50.00
(Italy) Inter Milan	4	2	2	0	5	1	+4	50.00
(Turkey) İstanbul Başakşehir	2	1	0	1	5	3	+2	50.00
(Italy) Juventus	14	6	2	6	17	17	+0	42.86
(Slovakia) Košice	2	2	0	0	6	0	+6	100.00
(Austria) LASK	2	2	0	0	7	1	+6	100.00
(Italy) Lazio	1	0	0	1	0	1	−1	0.00
(Ecuador) LDU Quito	1	1	0	0	1	0	+1	100.00
(Poland) Legia Warsaw	2	1	1	0	4	2	+2	50.00
(France) Lille	6	3	2	1	4	2	+2	50.00
(England) Liverpool	2	0	1	1	1	3	−2	0.00
(Poland) ŁKS Łódź	2	1	1	0	2	0	+2	50.00
(France) Lyon	6	3	3	0	13	10	+3	50.00
(Israel) Maccabi Haifa	2	1	0	1	5	5	+0	50.00
(France) Marseille	4	2	1	1	4	3	+1	50.00
(Denmark) Midtjylland	2	1	0	1	6	3	+3	50.00
(Italy) Milan	12	6	1	5	15	17	−2	50.00
(France) Monaco	2	0	2	0	1	1	+0	0.00
(France) Montpellier	2	1	1	0	3	1	+2	50.00
(France) Nantes	2	1	1	0	6	2	+4	50.00
(Mexico) Necaxa	1	0	1	0	1	1	+0	0.00
(Greece) Olympiacos	6	5	0	1	15	4	+11	83.33
(Cyprus) Omonia	2	2	0	0	4	2	+2	100.00
(Romania) Oțelul Galați	2	2	0	0	4	0	+4	100.00
(Brazil) Palmeiras	1	1	0	0	1	0	+1	100.00
(Greece) Panathinaikos	4	3	1	0	10	2	+8	75.00
(Greece) PAOK	1	1	0	0	2	0	+2	100.00
(France) Paris Saint-Germain	4	2	0	2	6	7	−1	50.00
(Serbia) Partizan	4	3	0	1	5	2	+3	75.00
(Hungary) Pécsi MFC	2	2	0	0	3	0	+3	100.00
(Portugal) Porto	9	3	4	2	17	14	+3	33.33
(Netherlands) PSV Eindhoven	6	2	2	2	6	6	+0	33.33
(Scotland) Rangers	5	4	1	0	7	1	+6	80.00
(Austria) Rapid Wien	4	3	1	0	7	0	+7	75.00
(Germany) RB Leipzig	2	1	0	1	7	3	+4	50.00
(Spain) Real Betis	2	2	0	0	5	1	+4	100.00
(Spain) Real Madrid	11	2	4	5	17	22	−5	18.18
(Spain) Real Sociedad	8	4	3	1	11	3	+8	50.00
(Serbia) Red Star Belgrade	3	2	1	0	6	4	+2	66.67
(Italy) Roma	9	6	1	2	24	11	+13	66.67
(Russia) Rostov	2	1	1	0	2	1	+1	50.00
(Russia) Rotor Volgograd	2	0	2	0	2	2	+0	0.00
(Azerbaijan) Sabah	1	1	0	0	4	0	+4	100.00
(France) Saint-Étienne	4	3	1	0	7	1	+6	75.00
(Bosnia and Herzegovina) Sarajevo	2	1	1	0	2	1	+1	50.00
(Germany) Schalke 04	2	2	0	0	6	1	+5	100.00
(Spain) Sevilla	5	0	2	3	4	9	−5	0.00
(Ukraine) Shakhtar Donetsk	2	1	1	0	2	1	+1	50.00
(Republic of Ireland) Shamrock Rovers	2	2	0	0	9	2	+7	100.00
(Moldova) Sheriff Tiraspol	2	2	0	0	5	0	+5	100.00
(Australia) South Melbourne	1	1	0	0	2	0	+2	100.00
(Czech Republic) Sparta Prague	2	1	1	0	4	1	+3	50.00
(Bulgaria) Spartak Varna	2	2	0	0	4	1	+3	100.00
(Portugal) Sporting CP	4	3	0	1	7	7	+0	75.00
(France) Strasbourg	2	1	1	0	5	0	+5	50.00
(Austria) Sturm Graz	4	4	0	0	10	1	+9	100.00
(Germany) VfB Stuttgart	2	1	0	1	3	2	+1	50.00
(Russia) Torpedo Moscow	2	0	2	0	0	0	+0	0.00
(England) Tottenham Hotspur	3	1	0	2	4	4	+0	33.33
(Netherlands) Twente	1	0	1	0	1	1	+0	0.00
(Spain) Valencia	10	2	6	2	8	6	+2	20.00
(Brazil) Vasco da Gama	1	0	0	1	1	3	−2	0.00
(Hungary) Videoton	2	1	0	1	1	1	+0	50.00
(Czech Republic) Viktoria Plzeň	1	1	0	0	2	1	+1	100.00
(Spain) Villarreal	7	2	5	0	5	2	+3	28.57
(East Germany) Vorwärts Berlin	2	2	0	0	5	1	+4	100.00
(Republic of Ireland) Waterford	2	2	0	0	10	2	+8	100.00
(Poland) Widzew Łódź	2	0	2	0	1	1	+0	0.00
(Netherlands) Willem II	2	1	1	0	7	2	+5	50.00
(Germany) VfL Wolfsburg	4	3	0	1	9	6	+3	75.00
(Wales) Wrexham	2	2	0	0	5	0	+5	100.00
(Switzerland) Young Boys	4	2	1	1	6	3	+3	50.00
(Hungary) Zalaegerszeg	2	1	0	1	5	1	+4	50.00
(Russia) Zenit Saint Petersburg	1	0	0	1	1	2	−1	0.00
(Ukraine) Zorya Luhansk	2	2	0	0	3	0	+3	100.00

== Honours ==
=== European ===
- European Cup / UEFA Champions League:
  - Winners: 1967–68, 1998–99, 2007–08
  - Runners-up: 2008–09, 2010–11
- UEFA Europa League:
  - Winners: 2016–17
  - Runners-up: 2020–21, 2024–25
- UEFA Cup Winners' Cup:
  - Winners: 1990–91
- UEFA Super Cup:
  - Winners 1991
  - Runners-up: 1999, 2008, 2017

=== Worldwide ===
- Intercontinental Cup:
  - Winners: 1999
  - Runners-up: 1968
- FIFA Club World Cup:
  - Winners: 2008
