= David Wilson (footballer, born 1969) =

English footballer and manager

Personal information
- Full name: David Graham Wilson
- Date of birth: 20 March 1969 (age 57)
- Place of birth: Burnley, Lancashire, England
- Height: 5 ft 10 in (1.78 m)
- Position: Centre midfielder

Youth career
- 1984–1987: Manchester United

Senior career*
Years	Team	Apps	(Gls)
1987–1991	Manchester United	6	(0)
1990	→ Lincoln City (loan)	3	(0)
1991	→ Charlton Athletic (loan)	7	(2)
1991–1993	Bristol Rovers	11	(0)
1993	RoPS	22	(1)
1994–1998	Ljungskile	135	(7)
1999–2001	Haka	76	(3)
2002	HJK Helsinki	11	(2)
2003–2004	Ljungskile	?	(?)
2005	Rosseröd	?	(?)

Managerial career
- 2003–2005: Ljungskile (player-manager)
- 2006: GIF Sundsvall
- 2006–2009: Ljungskile
- * Club domestic league appearances and goals

David Graham Wilson (born 20 March 1969) is an English former footballer and football manager, who was last the manager of Ljungskile in the Swedish Allsvenskan, the first level of football in Sweden. As a player, he played as a centre midfielder for several English clubs, including Manchester United, Charlton Athletic and Bristol Rovers, in the late 1980s and early 1990s, before moving to Scandinavia, playing for various clubs in Finland and Sweden. Wilson is now employed as an International Scout by Chelsea Football Club.

== Career ==
Born in Burnley, Lancashire, Wilson joined Manchester United on associate schoolboy terms in January 1984. He made 12 appearances for the club's Junior B team in the Lancashire League Second Division in 1984–85 season, and signed apprentice forms in May 1985. The following season, he divided his time between the club's Junior A, Junior B and Youth teams, as well as making an appearance for the Reserve team in March 1986. In March 1987, Wilson signed a professional contract with Manchester United and, by the 1987–88 season, he had become a regular in the Reserve team.

The 1988–89 season saw Wilson finally progress to the first team, coming on as an 88th-minute substitute for Clayton Blackmore in a 1–1 home draw with Sheffield Wednesday on 23 November 1988. He made his FA Cup debut later that season, playing in the Third Round tie against Queens Park Rangers on 7 January 1989; the match finished goalless, forcing a replay four days later, which Wilson also played in.

Unfortunately for Wilson, his sixth appearance for the club – all of which came as a substitute – would also be his last first team outing. After that 2–0 home defeat to Derby County, Wilson returned to playing in the club's Reserve team, and was sent on a month-long loan to Lincoln City in October 1990. In March 1991, he went on loan again, this time to Charlton Athletic, where he played until the end of the season. His Manchester United contract expired at the end of June 1991, and he was allowed to join Bristol Rovers on a free transfer on 30 June 1991.

Wilson played for Bristol Rovers for two seasons, but only managed 11 appearances for the Somerset club before moving to Finland to play for RoPS (Rovaniemen Palloseura) for the second half of the 1993 Veikkausliiga season. He was then picked up by Ljungskile of Sweden for the 1994 season, and played for them until the end of 1998. Between 1999 and 2001, Wilson played for Haka of Finland where he twice picked up a league winners medal, but he was then signed by HJK Helsinki for the 2002 season, winning a further league title. In 2003, Wilson returned to Sweden and to Ljungskile, this time as a player-manager. He remained in the role for two seasons, before spending a third purely as a manager. In that third season, he guided the team to promotion to the Superettan via a play-off win against Vasby United and a fourth-place finish in 2005 during their first season back in the Superettan, before winding down his playing career with Rosseröd.

The following season, Wilson went into management on a full-time basis, taking the reins at GIF Sundsvall. After a season in Sundsvall, Wilson returned to Ljungskile for a third time, and guided them to promotion to the Allsvenskan in his second season back at the club. In the 2008 season, however, Ljungskile could only finish in 14th place in the league and had to play in a relegation play-off against the third-placed team from the Superettan, Brommapojkarna. Ljungskile managed a 0–0 draw away from home, but a 1–1 draw at the H. A. Bygg Arena meant that Brommapojkarna were promoted to the Allsvenskan on away goals, at Ljungskile's expense.

== Coaching career ==
Wilson's first foray into management came in 2003, when he was made player-manager of Ljungskile. He returned to playing for a season in 2005, before becoming a full-time manager with GIF Sundsvall in 2006. He returned to Ljungskile later that year, and guided them to promotion to the Allsvenskan in 2007 and left his position as manager of LSK in November 2008.
