= 2017 UEFA Europa League final =

- Match programme cover
- Event: 2016–17 UEFA Europa League
| Ajax | Manchester United |
| (Netherlands) | (England) |
| 0 | 2 |
- Date: 24 May 2017
- Venue: Friends Arena, Solna
- Man of the Match: Ander Herrera (Manchester United)
- Referee: Damir Skomina (Slovenia)
- Attendance: 46,961
- Weather: Partly cloudy 19 °C (66 °F); 44% humidity

The 2017 UEFA Europa League final was the final match of the 2016–17 UEFA Europa League, the 46th season of Europe's secondary club football tournament organised by UEFA, and the 8th season since it was renamed from the UEFA Cup to the UEFA Europa League. It was played on 24 May 2017 at the Friends Arena in Solna, Stockholm, Sweden, between Dutch side Ajax and English side Manchester United. Manchester United won the match 2–0 to secure their first title in this competition. With this victory, they joined Juventus, fellow finalists Ajax, Bayern Munich and Chelsea as the only clubs to won all three major European trophies at the time (European Champion Clubs' Cup/UEFA Champions League, UEFA Cup/Europa League, and the now-defunct Cup Winners' Cup); while, with this defeat, Ajax became the fifth club – after Hamburger SV, Fiorentina, Arsenal and Liverpool – to have lost a final in all these competitions.

Manchester United earned the right to play against the winners of the 2016–17 UEFA Champions League, Real Madrid, in the 2017 UEFA Super Cup. They also entered the group stage of the 2017–18 UEFA Champions League, as the berth reserved for the Champions League title holders was not used. Police of Stockholm took measures against potential terrorist attacks which they described as "the new normality", since two had occurred in Stockholm in 2010 and just a month before the final, and also prepared for potential clashes between supporters.

It was United's last trophy for nearly six years until they defeated Newcastle United 2–0 to win the 2023 EFL Cup final.

== Venue ==
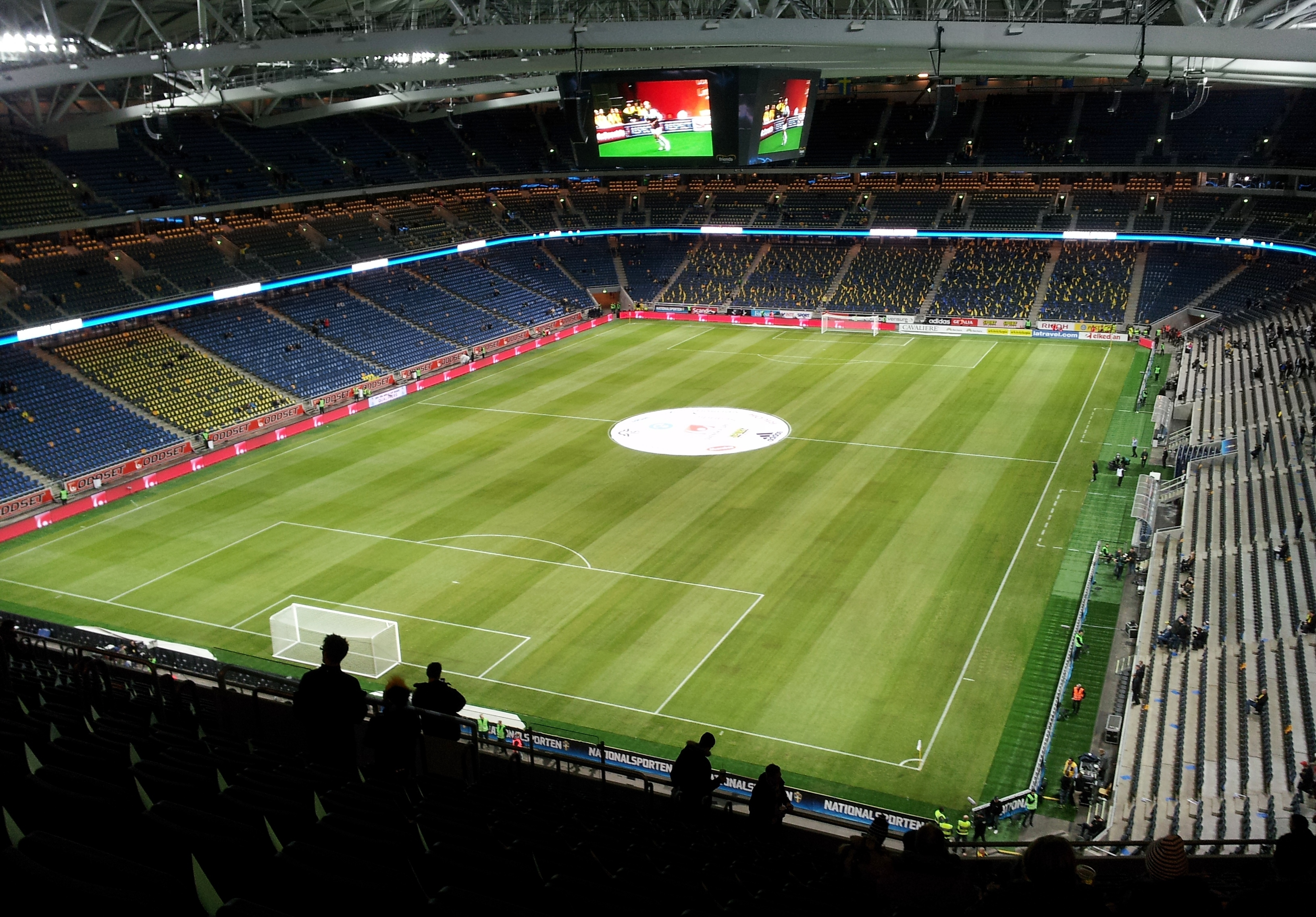
The Friends Arena in Solna hosted the final

Friends Arena, located in Solna Municipality of the Stockholm urban area, was announced as the final venue on 30 June 2015, following the decision of the UEFA Executive Committee meeting in Prague, Czech Republic.

== Background ==
This was Ajax's second final in the UEFA Cup/Europa League, having won in the 1992 UEFA Cup Final over Torino on away goals.

This was Manchester United's first final in the UEFA Cup/Europa League. They were seeking to become only the fifth club to have won all three major European trophies at the time (European Champion Clubs' Cup/UEFA Champions League, UEFA Cup/Europa League, and the now-defunct UEFA Cup Winners' Cup).

The two sides had previously met four times in European competitions, all in the UEFA Cup/Europa League, with a record of two wins each. However, Manchester United had eliminated Ajax on both occasions, 2–1 on aggregate in the 1976–77 UEFA Cup first round, and 3–2 on aggregate in the 2011–12 UEFA Europa League round of 32.

=== Previous finals ===
In the following table, finals until 2009 were in the UEFA Cup era, since 2010 were in the UEFA Europa League era.

| Team | Previous finals appearances (bold indicates winners) |
|---|---|
| (Netherlands) Ajax | 1 (**1992**) |
| (England) Manchester United | None |

== Route to the final ==
Note: In the table, the score of the finalist is given first (H = home; A = away).

| (Netherlands) Ajax | | | | Round | (England) Manchester United | | | |
|---|---|---|---|---|---|---|---|---|
| Champions League | | | | | Europa League | | | |
| Opponent | Agg. | 1st leg | 2nd leg | Qualifying phase (CL, EL) | Bye | | | |
| (Greece) PAOK | 3–2 | 1–1 (H) | 2–1 (A) | Third qualifying round | Bye | | | |
| (Russia) Rostov | 2–5 | 1–1 (H) | 1–4 (A) | Play-off round | Bye | | | |
| Europa League | | | | | Bye | | | |
| Opponent | Result | | | Group stage | Opponent | Result | | |
| (Greece) Panathinaikos | 2–1 (A) | | | Matchday 1 | (Netherlands) Feyenoord | 0–1 (A) | | |
| (Belgium) Standard Liège | 1–0 (H) | | | Matchday 2 | (Ukraine) Zorya Luhansk | 1–0 (H) | | |
| (Spain) Celta Vigo | 2–2 (A) | | | Matchday 3 | (Turkey) Fenerbahçe | 4–1 (H) | | |
| (Spain) Celta Vigo | 3–2 (H) | | | Matchday 4 | (Turkey) Fenerbahçe | 1–2 (A) | | |
| (Greece) Panathinaikos | 2–0 (H) | | | Matchday 5 | (Netherlands) Feyenoord | 4–0 (H) | | |
| (Belgium) Standard Liège | 1–1 (A) | | | Matchday 6 | (Ukraine) Zorya Luhansk | 2–0 (A) | | |
| Group G winners: Pos / Team / Pld / Pts; 1 / (Netherlands) Ajax / 6 / 14; 2 / (Spain) Celta Vigo / 6 / 9; 3 / (Belgium) Standard Liège / 6 / 7; 4 / (Greece) Panathinaikos / 6 / 1; Source: UEFA | | | | Final standings | Group A runners-up: Pos / Team / Pld / Pts; 1 / (Turkey) Fenerbahçe / 6 / 13; 2 / (England) Manchester United / 6 / 12; 3 / (Netherlands) Feyenoord / 6 / 7; 4 / (Ukraine) Zorya Luhansk / 6 / 2; Source: UEFA | | | |
| Opponent | Agg. | 1st leg | 2nd leg | Knockout phase | Opponent | Agg. | 1st leg | 2nd leg |
| (Poland) Legia Warsaw | 1–0 | 0–0 (A) | 1–0 (H) | Round of 32 | (France) Saint-Étienne | 4–0 | 3–0 (H) | 1–0 (A) |
| (Denmark) Copenhagen | 3–2 | 1–2 (A) | 2–0 (H) | Round of 16 | (Russia) Rostov | 2–1 | 1–1 (A) | 1–0 (H) |
| (Germany) Schalke 04 | 4–3 | 2–0 (H) | 2–3 (a.e.t.) (A) | Quarter-finals | (Belgium) Anderlecht | 3–2 | 1–1 (A) | 2–1 (a.e.t.) (H) |
| (France) Lyon | 5–4 | 4–1 (H) | 1–3 (A) | Semi-finals | (Spain) Celta Vigo | 2–1 | 1–0 (A) | 1–1 (H) |

== Pre-match ==
=== Ambassador ===
The ambassador for the final was former Swedish international player Patrik Andersson, who won the Champions League with Bayern Munich against Valencia in 2001.

=== Identity ===
UEFA unveiled the brand identity of the final on 26 August 2016 in Monaco during the group stage draw.

=== Ticketing ===
With a stadium capacity of 48,000 for the final, a total number of 37,000 tickets were available to fans and the general public, with the two finalist teams receiving 10,000 tickets each and with 17,000 tickets being available for sale to fans worldwide via UEFA.com from 17 to 28 March 2017 in four price categories: €150, €100, €70 and €45. The remaining tickets were allocated to the local organising committee, UEFA and national associations, commercial partners and broadcasters, and to serve the corporate hospitality programme.

=== Officials ===
In May 2017, Slovenian referee Damir Skomina was chosen to oversee the final. He was joined by compatriots Jure Praprotnik and Robert Vukan as assistant referees, Matej Jug and Slavko Vinčić as additional assistant referees, Tomaž Klančnik as reserve assistant referee, and Italian official Gianluca Rocchi as fourth official.

=== Opening ceremony ===
A minute's silence was observed before the final in memory to victims of the bombing in Manchester which occurred two days before the final; the opening ceremony was thus considerably reduced.

== Match ==
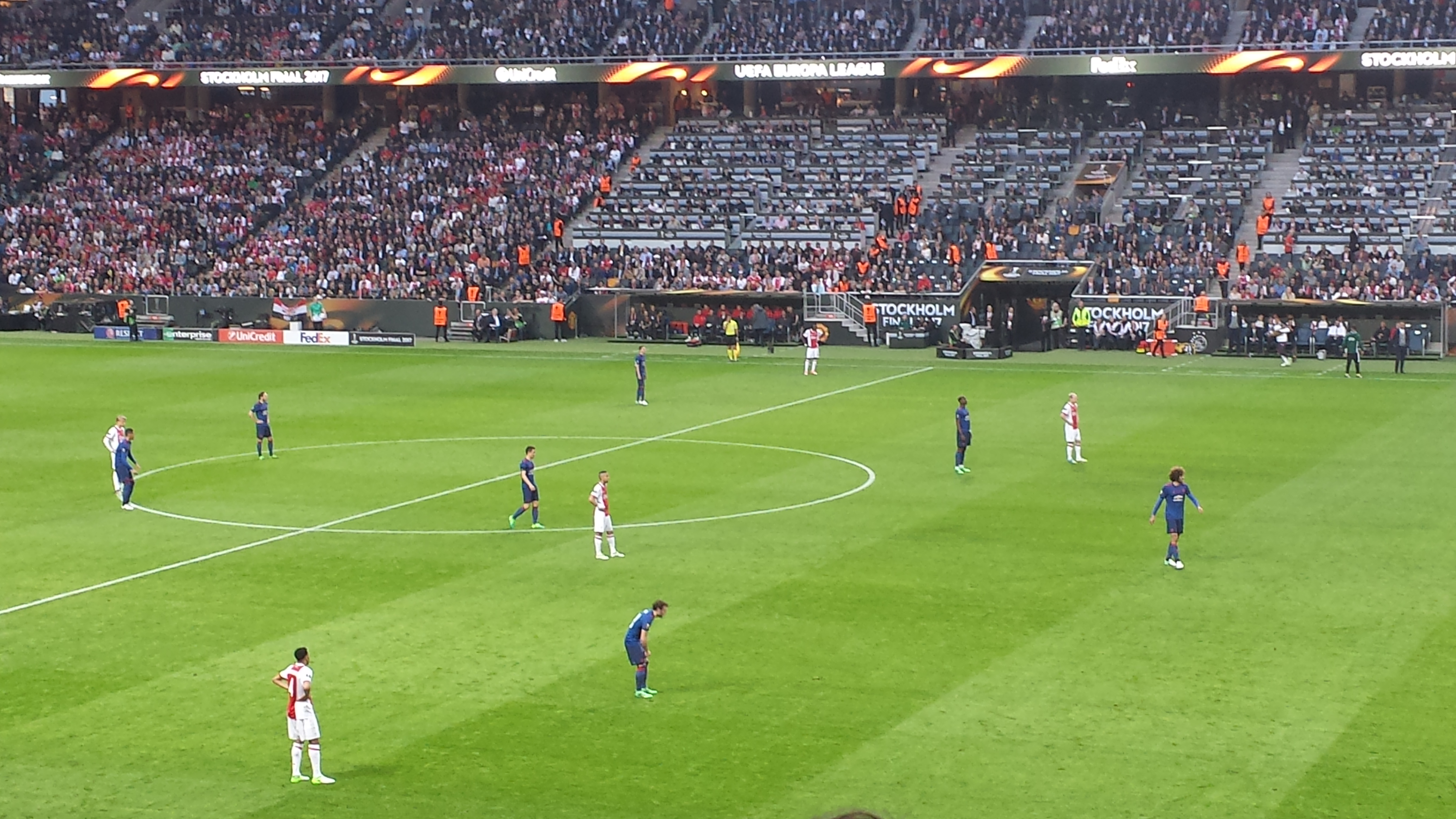
The players during the first half of the game.

=== Summary ===
Paul Pogba opened the scoring for Manchester United in the 18th minute when his low left foot shot from just outside the penalty area took a deflection off Davinson Sánchez which wrong footed the goalkeeper before looping over him and into the net. Henrikh Mkhitaryan got the second goal three minutes into the second half when with his back to goal he flicked the ball into the net with his right foot from three yards out after the ball had been knocked down to him by Chris Smalling after a corner from the right by Juan Mata. Wayne Rooney, who entered minutes before the final whistle, took the captain's armband and later led the team to lift the trophy in his final game for United; he would return to Everton less than two months later.

=== Details ===
The "home" team (for administrative purposes) was determined by an additional draw held after the semi-final draw, which was held on 21 April 2017 at UEFA headquarters in Nyon, Switzerland. Ajax as the "home" team played with their new home kit which would be used the following season. United wore their outgoing away (European third) kit.

24 May 2017
20:45 UTC+2

| Ajax (Netherlands) | 0–2 | (England) Manchester United |
|---|---|---|
| | Report | Pogba 18'; Mkhitaryan 48' |

Friends Arena, Solna
Attendance: 46,961
Referee: Damir Skomina (Slovenia)

| Ajax | Manchester United |

| GK | 24 | (Cameroon) André Onana |
| RB | 3 | (Netherlands) Joël Veltman | (yellow card) 58' |
| CB | 5 | (Colombia) Davinson Sánchez |
| CB | 36 | (Netherlands) Matthijs de Ligt |
| LB | 4 | (Netherlands) Jaïro Riedewald | (yellow card) 78' | (substituted off) 82' |
| CM | 10 | (Netherlands) Davy Klaassen (c) |
| CM | 20 | (Denmark) Lasse Schöne | | (substituted off) 70' |
| CM | 22 | (Morocco) Hakim Ziyech |
| RF | 9 | (Burkina Faso) Bertrand Traoré |
| CF | 25 | (Denmark) Kasper Dolberg | | (substituted off) 62' |
| LF | 11 | (Germany) Amin Younes | (yellow card) 64' |
Substitutes:
| GK | 33 | (Netherlands) Diederik Boer |
| DF | 2 | (Netherlands) Kenny Tete |
| DF | 16 | (Germany) Heiko Westermann |
| MF | 21 | (Netherlands) Frenkie de Jong | | (substituted on) 82' |
| MF | 30 | (Netherlands) Donny van de Beek | | (substituted on) 70' |
| FW | 45 | (Netherlands) Justin Kluivert |
| FW | 77 | (Brazil) David Neres | | (substituted on) 62' |
Manager:
(Netherlands) Peter Bosz

| GK | 20 | (Argentina) Sergio Romero |
| RB | 25 | (Ecuador) Antonio Valencia (c) |
| CB | 12 | (England) Chris Smalling |
| CB | 17 | (Netherlands) Daley Blind |
| LB | 36 | (Italy) Matteo Darmian |
| DM | 21 | (Spain) Ander Herrera |
| RM | 8 | (Spain) Juan Mata | (yellow card) 78' | (substituted off) 90' |
| CM | 27 | (Belgium) Marouane Fellaini | (yellow card) 52' |
| CM | 6 | (France) Paul Pogba |
| LM | 22 | (Armenia) Henrikh Mkhitaryan | (yellow card) 31' | (substituted off) 74' |
| CF | 19 | (England) Marcus Rashford | | (substituted off) 84' |
Substitutes:
| GK | 1 | (Spain) David de Gea |
| DF | 4 | (England) Phil Jones |
| DF | 24 | (Netherlands) Timothy Fosu-Mensah |
| MF | 14 | (England) Jesse Lingard | | (substituted on) 74' |
| MF | 16 | (England) Michael Carrick |
| FW | 10 | (England) Wayne Rooney | | (substituted on) 90' |
| FW | 11 | (France) Anthony Martial | | (substituted on) 84' |
Manager:
(Portugal) José Mourinho

Man of the Match:
Ander Herrera (Manchester United)

Assistant referees:
Jure Praprotnik (Slovenia)
Robert Vukan (Slovenia)
Fourth official:
Gianluca Rocchi (Italy)
Additional assistant referees:
Matej Jug (Slovenia)
Slavko Vinčić (Slovenia)
Reserve assistant referee:
Tomaž Klančnik (Slovenia)

Match rules

- 90 minutes
- 30 minutes of extra time if necessary
- Penalty shoot-out if scores still level
- Seven named substitutes, of which up to three may be used

=== Statistics ===
First half
| Statistic | Ajax | Manchester United |
|---|---|---|
| Goals scored | 0 | 1 |
| Total shots | 6 | 4 |
| Shots on target | 1 | 2 |
| Saves | 1 | 1 |
| Ball possession | 66% | 34% |
| Corner kicks | 2 | 0 |
| Fouls committed | 6 | 9 |
| Offsides | 0 | 1 |
| Yellow cards | 0 | 1 |
| Red cards | 0 | 0 |

Second half
| Statistic | Ajax | Manchester United |
|---|---|---|
| Goals scored | 0 | 1 |
| Total shots | 11 | 2 |
| Shots on target | 2 | 2 |
| Saves | 1 | 2 |
| Ball possession | 67% | 33% |
| Corner kicks | 3 | 2 |
| Fouls committed | 9 | 8 |
| Offsides | 0 | 0 |
| Yellow cards | 3 | 2 |
| Red cards | 0 | 0 |

Overall
| Statistic | Ajax | Manchester United |
|---|---|---|
| Goals scored | 0 | 2 |
| Total shots | 17 | 6 |
| Shots on target | 3 | 4 |
| Saves | 2 | 3 |
| Ball possession | 67% | 33% |
| Corner kicks | 5 | 2 |
| Fouls committed | 15 | 17 |
| Offsides | 0 | 1 |
| Yellow cards | 3 | 3 |
| Red cards | 0 | 0 |

== See also ==
- 2017 UEFA Champions League final
- 2017 UEFA Super Cup
- AFC Ajax in European football
- Manchester United F.C. in European football
- 2016–17 AFC Ajax season
- 2016–17 Manchester United F.C. season
