= Paul Wratten =

English footballer

Paul Wratten (born 29 November 1970) is an English retired footballer who played as a midfielder.

He signed for Manchester United on leaving school in the summer of 1987 and made two substitutes appearances late in the 1990-91 season, both in the First Division - the first against Wimbledon, the second against Crystal Palace.

Wratten was given a free transfer at the end of the 1991–92 and was signed by Alan Murray for Hartlepool United, who now found themselves in Division Two (now the third tier of English football) following the creation of the Premier League.

Wratten made 57 first team appearances for Hartlepool United, scoring one goal. His first season began brightly for the club, as they looked like promotion contenders capable of at least a play-off place, but a terrible loss of form in the second half of the season almost resulted in them suffering relegation to Division Three.

1993–94 saw Hartlepool finally relegated to Division Three, and at the end of the campaign new manager David McCreery decided that Wratten was no longer part of the clubs plans and gave him a free transfer. A brief spell at York City followed, but Wratten was released without making a first-team appearance and by the age of 24 his professional career was over, although he continued to play football at non-league level with Bishop Auckland in the Northern Premier League.
