= 1991 European Cup Winners' Cup final =

- Match programme cover
- Event: 1990–91 European Cup Winners' Cup
Manchester United	Barcelona
(England)	(Spain)
2	1
- Date: 15 May 1991
- Venue: Stadion Feijenoord, Rotterdam
- Referee: Bo Karlsson (Sweden)
- Attendance: 43,500

The 1991 European Cup Winners' Cup final was a football match played between Manchester United and Barcelona on 15 May 1991 at Feijenoord Stadion, Rotterdam. It was the final match of the 1990–91 European Cup Winners' Cup and the 31st European Cup Winners' Cup final. It came at the end of the first season of the reintroduction of English clubs into European competition after the ban following the Heysel disaster in 1985.

The match ended 2–1 to Manchester United on the night, with both United goals coming from former Barcelona forward Mark Hughes. Ronald Koeman scored a consolation goal for Barcelona towards the end of the game, but it was not enough to prevent the Red Devils from becoming the first English side to win a European competition since they were banned in 1985. It was also United's first European title in 23 years, since the European Cup in 1968. This was their only Cup Winners' Cup title, in which they only played one more season, where were eliminated in the second round in 1991–92.

== Route to the final ==
(England) Manchester United				Round	(Spain) Barcelona			
Opponent	Agg.	1st leg	2nd leg	Stages	Opponent	Agg.	1st leg	2nd leg
(Hungary) Pécs	3–0	2–0 (H)	1–0 (A)	First round	(Turkey) Trabzonspor	7–3	0–1 (A)	7–2 (H)
(Wales) Wrexham	5–0	3–0 (H)	2–0 (A)	Second round	(Iceland) Fram	5–1	2–1 (A)	3–0 (H)
(France) Montpellier	3–1	1–1 (H)	2–0 (A)	Quarter-finals	(Soviet Union) Dynamo Kyiv	4–3	3–2 (A)	1–1 (H)
(Poland) Legia Warsaw	4–2	3–1 (A)	1–1 (H)	Semi-finals	(Italy) Juventus	3–2	3–1 (H)	0–1 (A)

== Match ==
=== Summary ===
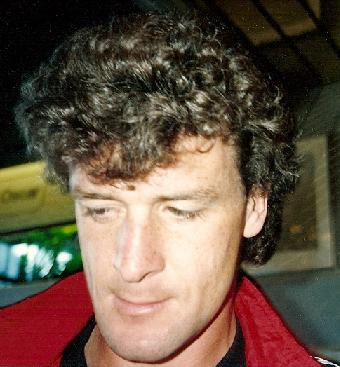
Former Barcelona forward Mark Hughes scored both of United's goals.

Mark Hughes, who had previously played for Barcelona, scored both of the goals for Manchester United. His career had faltered after Terry Venables took him to the Camp Nou in 1986. A loan spell at Bayern Munich revived him prior to his return to United in 1988.

After a goalless first half, United went 1–0 up following a free-kick from captain, Bryan Robson, which was headed goalwards by defender Steve Bruce. United striker Mark Hughes tapped the ball over the line, although whether the ball had already crossed before Hughes touched it was in dispute for some time, with both Bruce and Hughes claiming the goal (Mark Hughes later credited the goal to Steve Bruce, but the official scoreline shows both goals as being scored by Hughes). For his second goal, Hughes cut the ball into the net from such an acute angle on the right that he had to spin it off the outside of his boot to ensure that it found its mark.

After Koeman scored from a free kick, which came off the upright and hit the legs of United keeper Les Sealey before crossing the line, Barcelona had a late equaliser ruled out for offside and also had a shot cleared off the line. United finished the game 2–1 winners.

Manchester United were undefeated in all previous rounds matches prior to this game (unlike Barcelona who lost two games in previous rounds). Brian McClair scored at least once in every round that Manchester United were involved in, except the final.

The Spanish newspapers stated "The Red Devils came dressed in white, like angels" but went on to remark at how devilish United were in their beating of Barcelona.

=== Details ===
15 May 1991
20:15 CEST

Manchester United (England)	2–1	(Spain) Barcelona
Hughes 67', 74'	Report	Koeman 79'

Stadion Feijenoord, Rotterdam
Attendance: 43,500
Referee: Bo Karlsson (Sweden)

Manchester United	Barcelona

GK	1	(England) Les Sealey
RB	2	(Republic of Ireland) Denis Irwin
LB	3	(Wales) Clayton Blackmore
CB	4	(England) Steve Bruce
RM	5	(England) Mike Phelan
CB	6	(England) Gary Pallister
CM	7	(England) Bryan Robson (c)	(yellow card) 78'
CM	8	(England) Paul Ince
SS	9	(Scotland) Brian McClair
CF	10	(Wales) Mark Hughes
LM	11	(England) Lee Sharpe
Substitutes:
DF	12	(Northern Ireland) Mal Donaghy
GK	13	(England) Gary Walsh
MF	14	(England) Neil Webb
FW	15	(England) Mark Robins
FW	16	(England) Danny Wallace
Manager:
(Scotland) Alex Ferguson

GK	1	(Spain) Carles Busquets
RB	2	(Spain) Nando	(red card) 84'
CB	3	(Spain) José Ramón Alexanko (c)		(substituted off) 72'
DM	4	(Netherlands) Ronald Koeman
LB	5	(Spain) Albert Ferrer
CM	6	(Spain) José Mari Bakero	(yellow card) 76'
RM	7	(Spain) Jon Andoni Goikoetxea
CM	8	(Spain) Eusebio
CF	9	(Spain) Julio Salinas
CF	10	(Denmark) Michael Laudrup
LM	11	(Spain) Txiki Begiristain
Substitutes:
GK	12	(Spain) Jesús Angoy
MF	13	(Spain) Miquel Soler
DF	14	(Spain) Ricardo Serna
DF	15	(Spain) Sebastián Herrera
FW	16	(Spain) Antonio Pinilla		(substituted on) 72'
Manager:
(Netherlands) Johan Cruyff

Assistant referees:
Rune Larsson (Sweden)
Leif Sundell (Sweden)
Fourth official:
John Blankenstein (Netherlands)

Match rules

- 90 minutes.
- 30 minutes of extra time if necessary.
- Penalty shoot-out if scores still level.
- Five named substitutes.
- Maximum of two substitutions.

== See also ==
- 1990–91 European Cup Winners' Cup
- 1991 European Cup final
- 1991 UEFA Cup final
- 2009 UEFA Champions League final – contested between same teams
- 2011 UEFA Champions League final – contested between same teams
- FC Barcelona in international football
- Manchester United F.C. in European football
