= Marcus Rashford =

English footballer (born 1997)

Marcus Rashford MBE
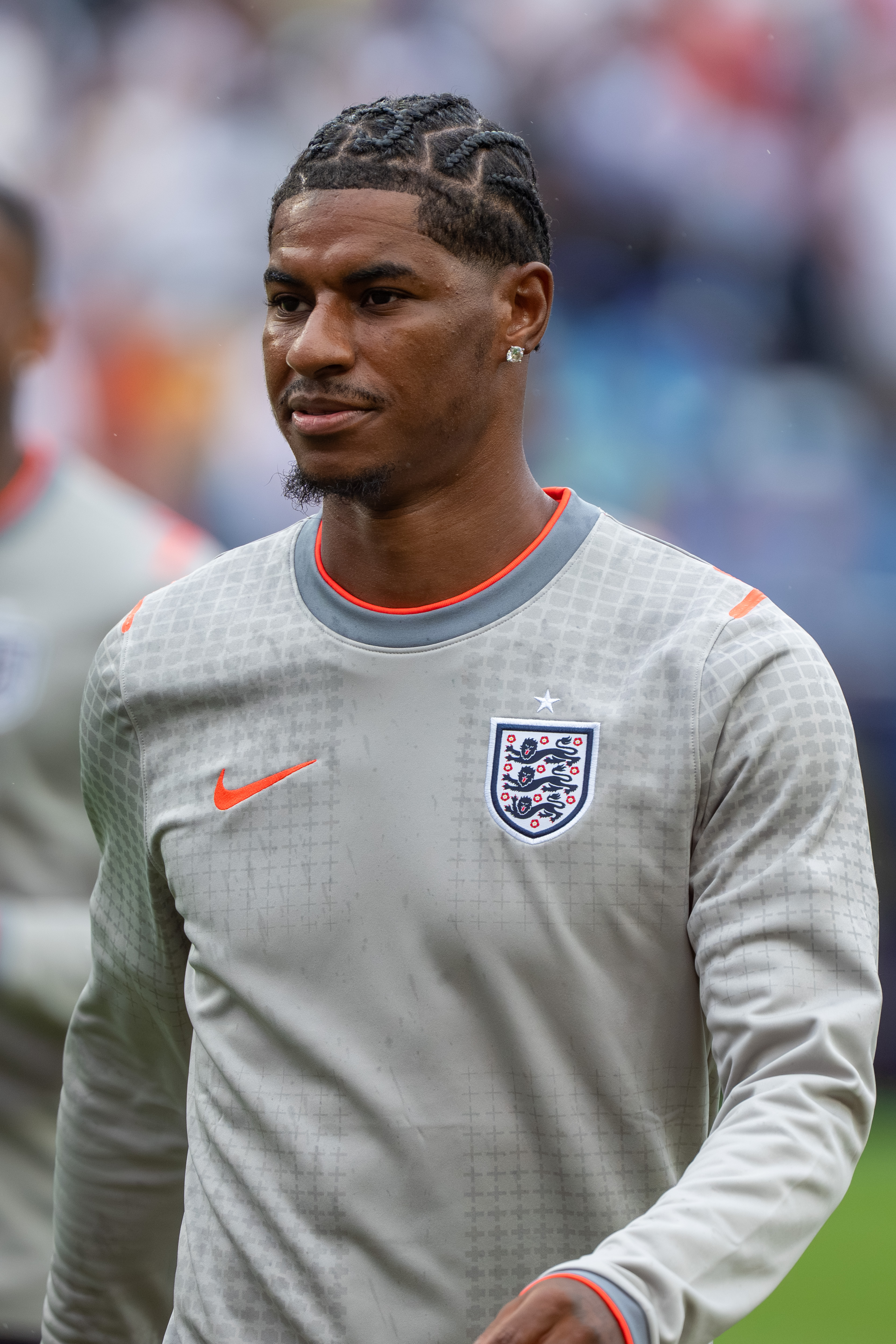
- Rashford with England in 2026

Personal information
- Full name: Marcus Rashford
- Date of birth: 31 October 1997 (age 29)
- Place of birth: Manchester, England
- Height: 6 ft 2 in (1.88 m)
- Position: Forward

Team information
- Current team: Manchester United
- Number: 9

Youth career
- 2003–2005: Fletcher Moss Rangers
- 2005–2015: Manchester United

Senior career*
Years	Team	Apps	(Gls)
2015–	Manchester United	293	(87)
2025	→ Aston Villa (loan)	10	(2)
2025–2026	→ Barcelona (loan)	32	(8)

International career^{‡}
2012	England U16	2	(0)
2014	England U18	2	(0)
2016	England U20	2	(0)
2016	England U21	1	(3)
2016–	England	78	(19)
Medal record
Men's football
Representing England
FIFA World Cup
Third place	2026 Canada–Mexico–US
UEFA European Championship
Runner-up	2020 Europe
UEFA Nations League
Third place	2019 Portugal
- * Club domestic league appearances and goals as of 22:36, 22 October 2026 (UTC) ‡ National team caps and goals as of 23:00, 18 July 2026 (UTC)

Marcus Rashford (born 31 October 1997) is an English professional footballer who plays as a forward for Premier League club Manchester United and the England national team.

A product of the Manchester United youth system, Rashford joined the club at the age of seven. Eighteen-year-old Rashford scored two goals on both his first-team and European debut against Midtjylland in the UEFA Europa League in February 2016 and his Premier League debut against Arsenal three days later. He also scored in his first Manchester derby, as well as on his EFL Cup and UEFA Champions League debuts. With United, Rashford has won two FA Cups, two EFL Cups, the FA Community Shield, and the UEFA Europa League. He was loaned to Aston Villa in 2025, then Barcelona. With Barcelona, he won the 2025–26 La Liga title.

Rashford scored on his England debut in May 2016, becoming the youngest English player to score in his first senior international match. He has since appeared at two UEFA European Championships: 2016, where he was the tournament's youngest player, and 2020, where he appeared in the final as England finished runners-up to Italy. He was also a member of the England squad at the 2018, 2022, and 2026 FIFA World Cups.

Rashford has been praised for using his platform to be a political activist and philanthropist to drive societal change. He is a campaigner against racism, homelessness, and child hunger in the United Kingdom. He has been recognised for his efforts by organisations both within and outside of sport, and was the subject of a mural in Withington.

== Early life ==
Marcus Rashford was born on 31 October 1997 in Manchester, and raised in the Fallowfield, Withington, and Wythenshawe areas of the city. His father is from Jamaica, and his mother of Kittitian descent, with his grandmother born on the West Indies island of Saint Kitts. Rashford comes from a working class family; his mother is Melanie Maynard, a single parent who worked multiple jobs, sometimes skipping meals to ensure her children had enough to eat. Rashford has four older siblings: two brothers, Dwaine Maynard and Dane Rashford, both of whom went on to represent him professionally, and two sisters, Chantelle and Claire. He is a cousin of footballer Lois Maynard, who plays as a midfielder for Radcliffe.

A childhood supporter of his local football club Manchester United, Rashford grew up in a family divided in their support of United and local rivals Manchester City. Rashford attended Ashton-on-Mersey School, where United have sent their academy players since 1998, close to their Carrington training ground; he studied for a Business and Technology Education Council (BTEC) National Diploma in Sport.

== Club career ==
=== Early career ===
Rashford began playing football for Fletcher Moss Rangers at the age of five, starting out as a goalkeeper, and cited former United goalkeeper Tim Howard as his goalkeeping idol. Fletcher Moss Rangers academy development officer Dave Horrocks recalls that Rashford was on a "different level" to other boys, playing a major role as the team won a tournament with 15 scouts from various clubs watching.

He spent a week training with Manchester City before he joined the academy system at Manchester United at the age of seven, amid interest from Everton and Liverpool. He credited his brothers with helping him decide to join United. Former United youth coach Paul McGuinness quickly saw Rashford's potential due to his athleticism both on and off the ball, but during his early years at the club he often had to miss training as a result of difficulty getting there while his mother and brothers were at work. He eventually received assistance from youth coaches Dave Bushell, Eamon Mulvey, and Tony Whelan, who helped find drivers for Rashford to get to the training ground. When he was 11, he became the youngest ever player to be selected for the Manchester United Schoolboy Scholars scheme, usually reserved for players 12 and above. He was fastracked and began playing cage football with Paul Pogba, Jesse Lingard and Ravel Morrison, helping to increase his skill level playing with players four years his senior.

In 2012, he was part of the Manchester United under-15 squad which finished second in the 23rd annual Marveld tournament. In 2014, The Guardian named him as Manchester United's best prospect in the 2014 Next Generation, saying that his "total-football style gives him a fair chance of going all the way". Rashford trained with United's first team for the first time aged 16 under the management of David Moyes during the 2013–14 season, and described the training session as "priceless" to himself and other United academy players; he began training with the first team more regularly, and was deemed a "high flier" by coaches.

In 2015, United Under-19s manager Nicky Butt praised Rashford's performances for the team in a group stage match of the UEFA Youth League. His inclusion in the team began following an injury to Demetri Mitchell, and he capitalised on his chance by scoring six goals in 11 games in the Under-18's Premier League, as well as three goals in the Youth League. He was awarded the captaincy of the team by Butt, who hailed him as a leader. Rashford was named on the first-team bench for the first time on 21 November by Louis van Gaal for a Premier League match against Watford, which Manchester United won 2–1. He received the number 39 squad number, due to Van Gaal's insistence that strikers wear a squad number containing a nine. The following week against Leicester City, he was again named on the bench, but was again unused in a 1–1 draw. In February 2016, Rashford was subject to a loan bid from League One club Crewe Alexandra, but the temporary transfer was rejected by Reserves manager Warren Joyce. Former teammate Sean Goss described how Rashford impressed in first-team training sessions while the club was suffering an injury crisis, despite being one of the younger players called up to train.

=== Manchester United ===
==== 2015–2016: Debut season ====
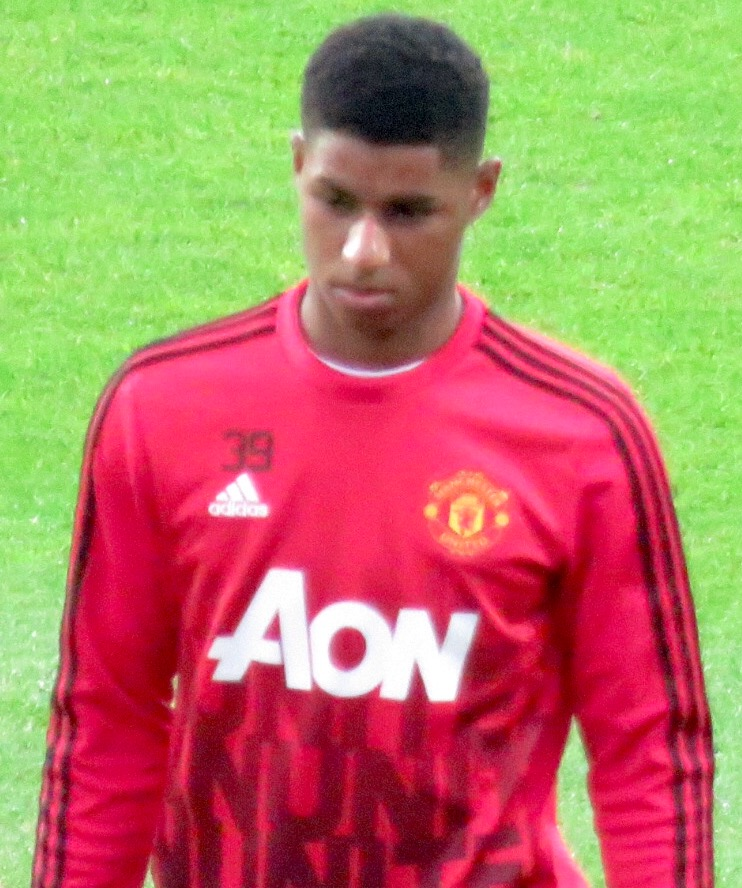
Rashford warming up for Manchester United in 2016

On 25 February 2016, Rashford was included in the 18-man squad for United's UEFA Europa League round of 32, second leg tie against Danish club Midtjylland, owing to an injury crisis which saw 13 players injured. After Anthony Martial was injured in the warm-up, Rashford was chosen to start the game, and marked his first-team debut with two goals in the second half of a 5–1 win. Rashford's goals made him United's youngest ever scorer in European competition, beating a record previously held by George Best, and which was later broken by Mason Greenwood in the 2019–20 season. Rashford made his Premier League debut against Arsenal three days later; he again scored twice and provided the assist for the other goal in a 3–2 home victory against their rivals, making him the third youngest scorer for United in the Premier League after Federico Macheda and Danny Welbeck. Van Gaal hailed his performance as "fantastic" and better than his first match, but urged caution from the press not to harass and hype him, feeling he had the character to cope.

On 20 March 2016, Rashford made history when he scored the only goal in the Manchester derby, his team's first away league win over Manchester City since 2012; aged just 18 years and 141 days, he became the youngest scorer in the fixture in the Premier League era, overtaking Wayne Rooney's record by almost one year. During the FA Cup sixth-round replay against West Ham United on 13 April, Rashford scored a goal in a 2–1 win to help United advance to the semi-final. Three days later, he scored the only goal of the game against Aston Villa, who were subsequently relegated for the first time since 1987. He later led the line in the FA Cup final against Crystal Palace on 21 May, which ended in a 2–1 victory marking United's 12th FA Cup win and Rashford's first piece of silverware. He ended the season with 8 goals in 18 appearances, and was voted the Jimmy Murphy Young Player of the Year. On 30 May, Rashford signed a new contract with United worth £20,000 a week, which would keep him at the club until 2020, with an option to extend for a further year.

==== 2016–2018: First-team breakthrough and European success ====
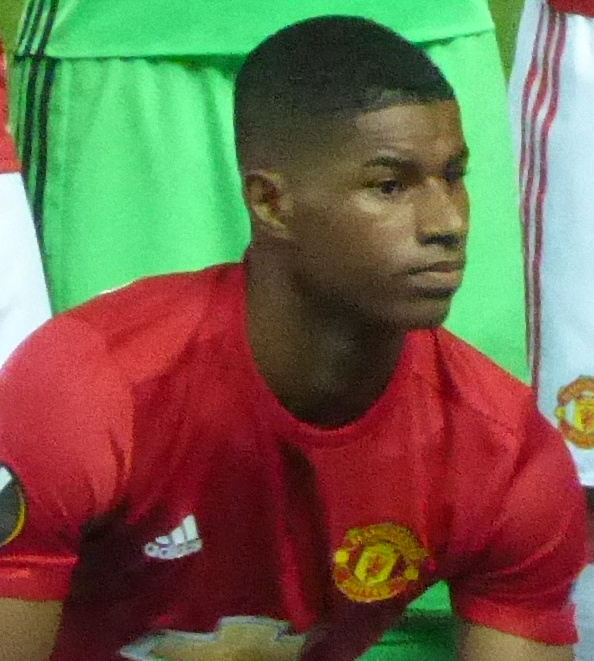
Rashford lining up for Manchester United in 2016

For the 2016–17 season, marking his place as part of the senior squad, Rashford was given the number 19 by new manager José Mourinho. The signing of veteran striker Zlatan Ibrahimović meant he often had to settle for a place on the substitutes bench, though upon his signing, Ibrahimović praised Rashford as a "huge talent" and "the future of England". Rashford's first goal of the season came on 27 August against Hull City, scoring in the second minute of injury time after coming on for Juan Mata in the 71st minute. He scored thrice more the next month, on 18 September in a 3–1 league defeat to Watford; on 21 September in a 3–1 victory against Northampton Town in the EFL Cup third round; and in a 4–1 league win over Leicester City on 24 September. The following month, he was named as runner-up to Portugal's Renato Sanches in the Golden Boy award for best European player under the age of 21. On the pitch, however, he failed to score until 7 January 2017, when he scored a four-minute brace in the FA Cup against Jaap Stam's Reading, which ended 4–0.

Rashford won his third trophy on 26 February in the EFL Cup final, coming on as a 77th-minute substitute in the 3–2 victory over Southampton. He was an instrumental part of United's 2–0 win over league leaders' Chelsea on 16 April, scoring the first goal after seven minutes from Ander Herrera's through ball. Rashford scored another key goal four days later against Anderlecht in the 107th minute of the Europa League quarter-final second leg in a 2–1 win (3–2 on aggregate), sending United into the next round. He started in the Europa League final on 24 May against Dutch team Ajax, which United won 2–0 thus earning his fourth, and first European, trophy. Due to the signing of Ibrahimović, Rashford spent the majority of the season on the wing. He made the most appearances of any United player during the season, playing 53 times.

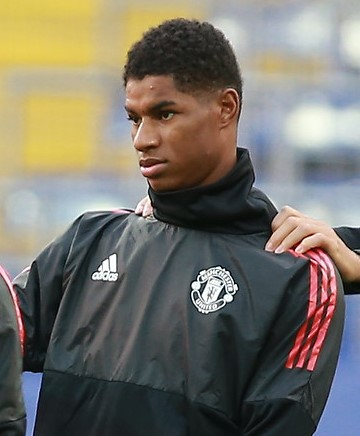
Rashford warming up for Manchester United in 2017

Rashford made his first appearance of his second full senior season on 8 August 2017 against Real Madrid in the UEFA Super Cup as a 46th-minute substitute in a 2–1 defeat. He started in a 4–0 home win against West Ham United five days later on 13 August, providing the assist for Romelu Lukaku's opening goal. Rashford scored his first goal of the season on 26 August, the opener in a 2–0 victory over Leicester, three minutes after coming on as a substitute. On 12 September, Rashford scored against Basel on his UEFA Champions League debut, the third in a 3–0 win, marking the sixth competition that he had scored on his debut. He scored a brace against Burton Albion on 20 September in the EFL Cup third round, as well as assisting the fourth goal in a 4–1 victory.

On 23 October 2017, Rashford came third in the 2017 Golden Boy award behind winner Kylian Mbappé and Ousmane Dembélé. By 28 October, Rashford had contributed to 12 goals in 16 games, with seven goals and five assists, with his most recent goal being against Huddersfield Town on 21 October and his most recent assist coming against Swansea City on 24 October. On 6 December, he put in a man of the match performance in a 2–1 victory against CSKA Moscow, scoring the winning goal to help United qualify for the knockout phase of the Champions League. In the January transfer window, the club signed Alexis Sánchez, threatening Rashford's future in the team.

On 10 March 2018, Rashford scored both goals in a 2–1 win over rivals Liverpool on his first Premier League start of the year. Three days later, United were eliminated from the Champions League after a 2–1 defeat to Spanish side Sevilla, with Rashford producing the assist for United's goal. Mourinho was criticised for playing Rashford out of position on the right wing, where he was unable to play with any "spontaneity and freedom". Rashford scored in United's last game of the season on 13 May, a 1–0 victory over Watford at Old Trafford. At the conclusion of the season, Mourinho rejected the possibility of Rashford leaving on loan, pointing out Rashford had been selected for almost every match of the season.

==== 2018–2021: Consistent goal-scoring form ====
Prior to the 2018–19 season, Rashford was given the squad number 10 following the release of Ibrahimović, the club's previous number 10. The shirt had also previously been worn in the Premier League by Teddy Sheringham, Ruud van Nistelrooy, and Wayne Rooney, and he was the third academy graduate to wear it after Mark Hughes and David Beckham. On 2 September 2018, Rashford was sent off in a 2–0 win over Burnley at Turf Moor after clashing heads with Phil Bardsley, having only been on the pitch for 10 minutes; Mourinho labelled him "naïve", and put it down to inexperience. On 11 September, Sky Sports pundit Jamie Carragher opined that Rashford would have to leave United to reach his potential, having not started a game in the season at that point. Mourinho defended his use of Rashford in the team, suggesting that other clubs did not give youth players the same game time Rashford had recorded in the prior two seasons; he started his first game and subsequently scored his first goal of the season on 29 September in a 3–1 loss to West Ham United. On 3 November, he scored again, providing a winning goal in the second minute of stoppage time in a 2–1 win over AFC Bournemouth.

On 1 December, Rashford provided both assists in United's 2–2 draw with Southampton, with the goals coming from Lukaku and Herrera. The following Saturday against Fulham, he provided two assists for Ashley Young and Juan Mata before scoring the final goal in a 4–1 victory. On 22 December, Rashford scored in the third minute of Manchester United's first match under new interim manager Ole Gunnar Solskjær, in which United beat Cardiff City 5–1. On 30 December, Rashford again scored against Bournemouth in his final game of 2018, also assisting Paul Pogba's first goal in United's 4–1 victory. Solskjær praised Rashford's performances during the beginning of his reign, describing him as "different class", and said he thought Rashford had the chance to become one of the best strikers in the world. During United's first match of 2019 on 2 January, Rashford assisted their first goal from a free kick and scored the second in a 2–0 win over Newcastle United at St James' Park. Following this series of performances, pundit Gary Neville praised Rashford for beginning to play beyond just his potential, establishing himself as a "devastating" forward player.

On 13 January 2019, Rashford scored the only goal in a 1–0 victory over Tottenham Hotspur at Wembley; this marked the first time he had scored in three successive league games in his career, the third youngest to achieve this for United behind only Rooney and Ronaldo. The following week, he made his 150th appearance for the club in a 2–1 win against Brighton & Hove Albion, scoring a solo goal to become the youngest player in United's history to score in four successive league games, and the fourth youngest to reach 150 games, behind Norman Whiteside, George Best and Ryan Giggs. On 2 February, Rashford was announced as Manchester United's Player of the Month for January, as well as winning United's goal of the month for his strike against Tottenham. A day later, he made his 100th league appearance for the club and scored the only goal in a 1–0 away victory over Leicester City. In doing so, he became the second-youngest player after Giggs to reach the milestone for the club. His impressive performances in January earned him his first Premier League Player of the Month title, becoming the first United player since Ibrahimović in December 2016 to win the award.

On 6 March, Rashford scored from his first competitive penalty for the club, sealing a 3–1 win in the second leg of their Champions League round of 16 tie against Paris Saint-Germain to send the club through to the quarter-final on the away goals rule; he also contributed to Lukaku's equaliser, who scored off the rebound from Rashford's initial shot. He becomes the second player in the history of the club after Wayne Rooney to score 9 goals in Europe at the age of 21 or below. Solskjær described him as "fearless" for taking the penalty. On 30 March, Rashford scored the opening goal in United's first victory with Solskjær as permanent manager, beating Watford 2–1.

On 1 July 2019, Rashford signed a new four-year contract with Manchester United, keeping him at the club until June 2023, with the option to extend by a further year. On the opening week of the season, Rashford scored a brace in a 4–0 win over Chelsea. In September, following a spell of poor form, Solskjær said he was not concerned about Rashford's dip in form and lack of goals. Towards the end of October, a return to form saw Rashford score in a 1–1 draw with rivals Liverpool, ending their 17 match winning streak. The following week, Rashford scored and assisted against Norwich City, and scored a second brace against Chelsea in the EFL Cup. The return to form saw Rashford go on the best goalscoring run of his career to date, with 16 club goals in 20 matches, ending the run with a brace in a 4–0 victory over Norwich. Rashford suffered a double stress fracture to the back in the following game, an FA Cup tie on 19 January 2020 against Wolverhampton Wanderers, which put him out of action for several months. By playing in the game, he became the fourth youngest United player to have played 200 games for the club.

The season was halted for over three months, following a decision on 13 March by the Premier League to suspend the league after a number of players and other club staff became ill due to the COVID-19 pandemic. In May, Solskjær announced that Rashford would be fit to play following the return to football during project restart, which saw the season resume behind closed doors for the remainder of the season. On 4 July, he scored his first goal since the restart as United beat Bournemouth 5–2. On 16 July, he scored his 17th league goal of the season in a 2–0 victory against Crystal Palace, equalling his tally in the two previous seasons combined. At the end of season, Rashford was voted third for the English FWA Footballer of the Year award, and he also received the PFA Merit Award.

On 26 September 2020, Rashford scored his first goal of the season in a 3–2 win against Brighton & Hove Albion. On 20 October, he scored the winning goal in a 2–1 away win against PSG in the first match of the 2020–21 Champions League. In the next Champions League match, Rashford scored his first United hat-trick in a 5–0 win over RB Leipzig; it was the second hat-trick ever scored by a United substitute, following manager Solskjær in the Premier League in 1999. He became the sixth United player to score a Champions League hat-trick, and the first since Robin van Persie in 2014. Rashford suffered a shoulder injury during a 3–1 victory against Everton; he continued to play despite the injury, but completed only one full game over the following month. On 26 December, Rashford became the third youngest United player to score 50 Premier League goals, when he scored the opening goal in the away fixture against Leicester City that ended in a 2–2 draw.

On 12 January 2021, Rashford assisted a goal for Paul Pogba to score the only goal of the game against Burnley, which resulted in United being top of the table for the first time since the 2012–13 season. On 2 February, he scored the second goal in United's Premier League record-equalling 9–0 win against Southampton. During a 1–0 win against West Ham in the FA Cup on 9 February, Rashford made his 250th appearance for the club, becoming the fourth youngest to reach the milestone. In April it was reported by ESPN that he had "not played a game completely pain-free in two years" due to shoulder, back, and foot injuries. Following the conclusion of the UEFA Euro 2020 tournament in which he represented England, it was agreed upon by club doctors and specialists that Rashford would be operated on; the surgery "went well" and ruled him out until October of the 2021–22 season.

==== 2021–2024: Fluctuating form and 30-goal season ====
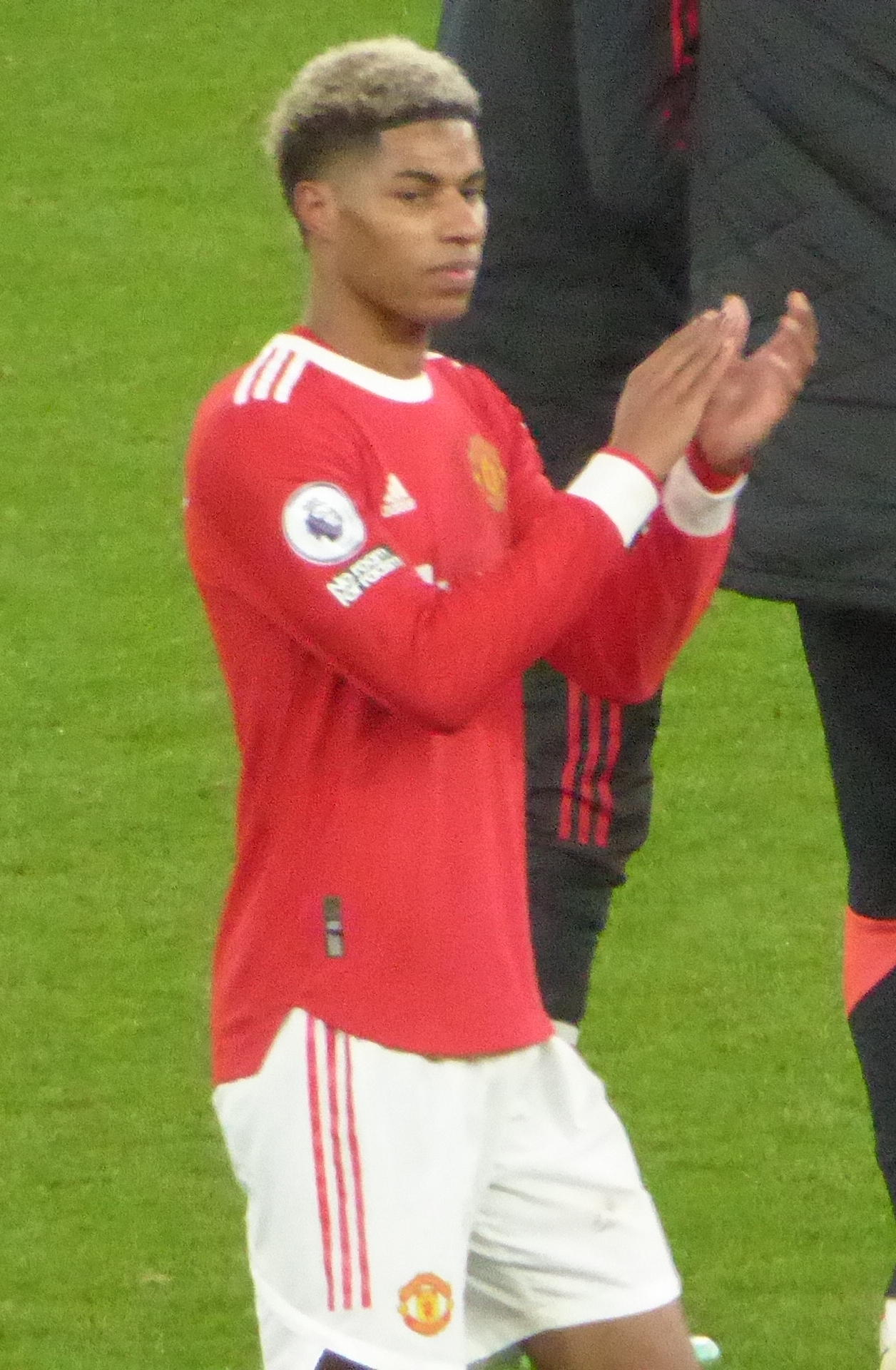
Rashford after a Manchester United match in 2022

Rashford returned to training on 11 October 2021, and made a goalscoring return in a 4–2 away loss to Leicester, coming off the bench and making the score 2–2. On 22 January 2022, in a 1–0 win against West Ham United, Rashford came on in the 63rd minute for Anthony Elanga, going on to score a 93rd-minute winner; the goal meant he had scored more last-minute winners in Premier League history (four) than any other player, and new manager Ralf Rangnick responded by saying Rashford was "one of the top strikers in England" amid a bad run of form.

After enjoying a successful pre-season under new manager Erik ten Hag, who began the season by deploying Rashford both as a centre-forward and a left winger, he opened his account for the 2022–23 season by scoring in a 2–1 win against Liverpool, and then twice in a 3–1 win against Arsenal; with an additional two assists, Rashford matched his contributions from the previous season. On 30 October, Rashford scored his 100th United goal in a 1–0 win against West Ham. He became the 22nd player to reach the figure for United, and the first in 13 years since Wayne Rooney. On 20 December, Rashford extended his contract by a year, but was dropped for a game against Wolverhampton Wanderers on 31 December as punishment for oversleeping and being late for a team meeting; he came on during the match and scored the only goal in a 1–0 win.

On 14 January 2023, he was instrumental in United's 2–1 comeback win in the Manchester derby, first being part of the build-up play for United's controversial equaliser despite being in an offside position, and then scoring the winning goal four minutes later. Rashford's performances during the season were recognised as some of the most impactful and consistent of his career. On 16 February, Rashford became the third United player – after Andy Cole and Dwight Yorke in 1998 – to score against Barcelona at the Camp Nou during a 2–2 draw in a knockout round play-off in the Europa League. On 26 February, Rashford scored his team's second goal in the 2023 EFL Cup final against Newcastle United, helping his team win the trophy; the goal was initially given as an own goal by Newcastle defender Sven Botman before Rashford was credited with the goal.

He scored his 30th goal of the season during a 4–1 win against Chelsea in May, with manager ten Hag saying he was capable of scoring 40 in a season; Rashford was the first United player to reach the milestone since Robin van Persie in the 2012–13 season. At the end of the season, he was voted by the club's supporters and playing squad as the Sir Matt Busby Player of the Year and the Players' Player of the Year.

On 18 July 2023, Rashford signed a new contract with United until 2028, worth a reported £325,000 per week (£16.9m per year). He received his second career red card in a 4–3 UEFA Champions League group stage loss to Copenhagen on 8 November that year. In January 2024, he missed an FA Cup game against Newport County after calling in sick; United said: "Marcus has taken responsibility for his actions. This has been dealt with as an internal disciplinary matter, which is now closed". Rashford, who had scored four goals in the first half of the season, had also been dropped by Ten Hag in November for hosting a birthday party after losing to Manchester City. Former United player Gary Neville said: "I know he's going through a dip in form at this moment in time but it's happened twice and it can sometimes become your personality if you're not careful". Rashford ended the season by winning the FA Cup for the second time, with a 2–1 victory over City in the final.

Ten Hag was dismissed by United on 28 October, with Ruben Amorim appointed as his replacement; in Amorim's first game on 24 November, Rashford scored the opening goal within 90 seconds against Ipswich Town in a 1–1 draw. On 1 December, Rashford scored twice during United's 4–0 home win over Everton. On 12 December, Rashford played in United's Europa League game against Viktoria Plzen and was substituted around the 56th minute mark. On 15 December, Rashford was not included in United's squad to face Manchester City; Amorim commented both before and after the game, saying that Rashford had no disciplinary issues but he had simply chosen not to select him, and that he was evaluating the situation. Two days later, Rashford told the media he was "ready for a new challenge". For the rest of December and into January 2025, Rashford was omitted from most of United's match squads, missing over ten games and being an unused substitute in one game against Newcastle. Towards the end of the month, Amorim was asked about Rashford's absence, with Amorim replying that he did not want to select someone who "doesn't give the maximum every day".

==== 2025–2026: Loans to Aston Villa and Barcelona ====
On 2 February 2025, Rashford joined fellow Premier League club Aston Villa on loan for the remainder of the 2024–25 season. It was reported that there was an option for the move to be made permanent at the end of the loan for £40 million. He made his debut for Villa on 9 February, coming on as a substitute in the 66th minute in a 2–1 home victory over Tottenham in the FA Cup fourth round. Rashford scored his first two goals for Villa on 30 March during a 3–0 win against Preston North End in the FA Cup quarter-finals. Three days later, he scored his first league goal for the club in a 3–0 win over Brighton & Hove Albion at Falmer Stadium.

In May, United made Rashford and several other players available for transfer. On 23 July, Rashford joined La Liga team Barcelona on a season-long loan, with an option of signing on a permanent basis for £30.3 million (€35 million) at the end of the 2025–26 season. His debut came on 16 August, coming on as a 68th-minute substitute for Ferran Torres in a 3–0 league win against Mallorca. He scored his first goals on his Barcelona Champions League debut on 18 September 2025, netting both goals in a 2–1 away victory over Newcastle United. On 5 October, Rashford scored his first league goal in a 4–1 defeat against Sevilla. On 21 October, he scored his third Champions League brace, netting the last 2 goals in a 6–1 victory against Olympiacos.

On 10 May 2026, Rashford scored from a free kick in a 2–0 win over rivals Real Madrid in El Clásico, securing his club's 29th La Liga title, and his first league title. Barcelona held a €30 million option to make Rashford's loan move permanent, but the clause expired at the end of the 2025–26 season without being activated. Although Rashford expressed his desire to stay at Barcelona, the club declined to activate the buy option after signing Anthony Gordon, resulting in his return to Manchester United.

==== 2026–2027: Return to Manchester United ====
On 22 August 2026, Rashford made his first appearance for Manchester United since December 2024, coming on as a substitute in a 2–0 away defeat to Hull City.

== International career ==
=== Youth ===
In 2012, Rashford was invited to an England under-16 training camp, and was later selected to play in the Victory Shield against Northern Ireland under-16s in September, and Wales under-16s in October. Under-16's manager Kenny Swain later revealed that Rashford only played two appearances for the side due to an understanding with coaches at Manchester United regarding him being underdeveloped physically, and also thought the exposure would have been "too much" for him.

Three weeks after making his senior début for United in early 2016, Rashford made his first appearance for the England under-20 team, providing an assist for Kasey Palmer in a 2–1 defeat to Canada under-20s. Despite already making his senior début earlier in the year, Rashford was called up to the England under-21 team for the first time in August 2016 for a fixture in September against Norway under-21s. He scored a hat-trick in the 6–1 home victory over Norway in his only appearance for the team, scoring the third with a penalty, his first since turning professional. Under-21 manager Gareth Southgate praised Rashford for his humility in dropping down to under-21 level.

Despite having already made his senior tournament début, it was expected Rashford would be available for selection for the 2017 UEFA European Under-21 Championship, with the hopes of gaining more tournament experience. United manager José Mourinho responded to these reports by stating it would make no sense for his development as he was already playing senior football. In April 2017, Mourinho appeared to concede Rashford would attend the tournament, saying he had no right to stop him from participating, but later in the month reiterated his opinion that dropping down wouldn't make sense, with Rashford having gained so much senior experience throughout the season. In May, Rashford made the decision not to go to the tournament, and was instead selected for the senior squad by Southgate, the new manager. Southgate praised the decisions taken by United coaching staff in helping maximise the potential of Rashford by not allowing him exposure at youth level for England, saying his development had been handled well by all parties.

=== Senior ===
==== 2016–2018: First Major tournaments ====
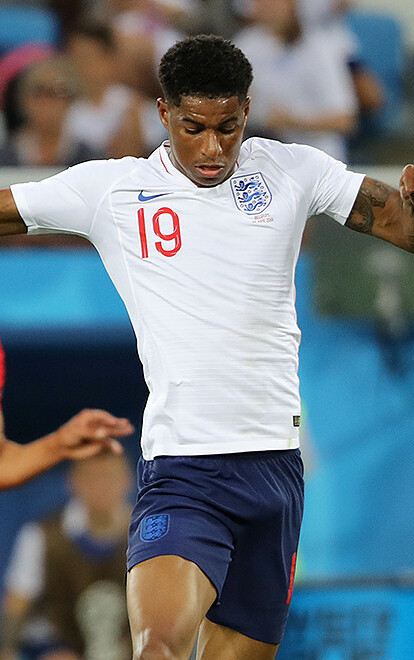
Rashford playing for England at the 2018 FIFA World Cup

Rashford's performances in his first senior season led to calls for him to represent England at UEFA Euro 2016. Manchester United academy coach Nicky Butt dismissed these calls, calling them premature and possibly harmful for the player's development, as did England manager Roy Hodgson, who said Rashford should be allowed to "develop in peace". In April 2016, Hodgson said it was "unlikely" Rashford would be included in his tournament squad, but on 16 May, Hodgson named him in his preliminary 26-man squad for the tournament. He became part of England's Euro 2016 squad less than four months after making his United debut.

On 27 May 2016, the 18-year-old made his debut for England wearing the number nine shirt, starting a warm-up match against Australia at the Stadium of Light and scoring the opening goal of a 2–1 win after three minutes, becoming the youngest Englishman to score on his international début, and the third youngest overall. The previous youngest scoring debutant was Tommy Lawton in 1938. On 16 June, he replaced Adam Lallana in the 73rd minute of England's 2–1 win over Wales at Euro 2016, making his tournament début at the age of 18 years and 229 days, becoming England's youngest ever player at a European Championships and breaking Wayne Rooney's Euro 2004 record by four days. He played just one more game in the tournament, coming on as a late substitute in England's shock 2–1 loss to Iceland in which he was praised for his impact, but described it as a valuable experience.

New England manager Sam Allardyce told Rashford he would not be called up to his first squad for a World Cup qualification match against Slovakia in September 2016, citing his lack of playing time in the early stages of the season. Allardyce was quickly replaced by Southgate, and Rashford was recalled to the senior team for games against Malta and Slovenia in October. Rashford scored his first competitive goal for the senior team on 4 September 2017, with the winning goal in England's 2–1 win over Slovakia in a World Cup qualifier. He was named in the 23-man England squad for the 2018 FIFA World Cup. Rashford scored the opening goal of England's final warm-up match against Costa Rica on 7 June 2018, and was tipped by former England stars Chris Waddle and Glenn Hoddle to start England's opening match against Tunisia. He started the game on the bench, but came on and performed well after replacing Raheem Sterling, deemed to be his direct competition for the starting role. Rashford was reportedly set to start the second game against Panama due to the potential physically posed by their opposition, but Southgate ultimately changed his mind, Having already qualified for the knockout stage, he started England's final group game against Belgium alongside Jamie Vardy, but failed to impress. Rashford came on as a substitute and scored in the round of 16 penalty shoot-out against Colombia which saw England progress to the quarter-final. England ultimately finished fourth overall – their best performance since 1990.

==== 2018–2021: European finalist ====
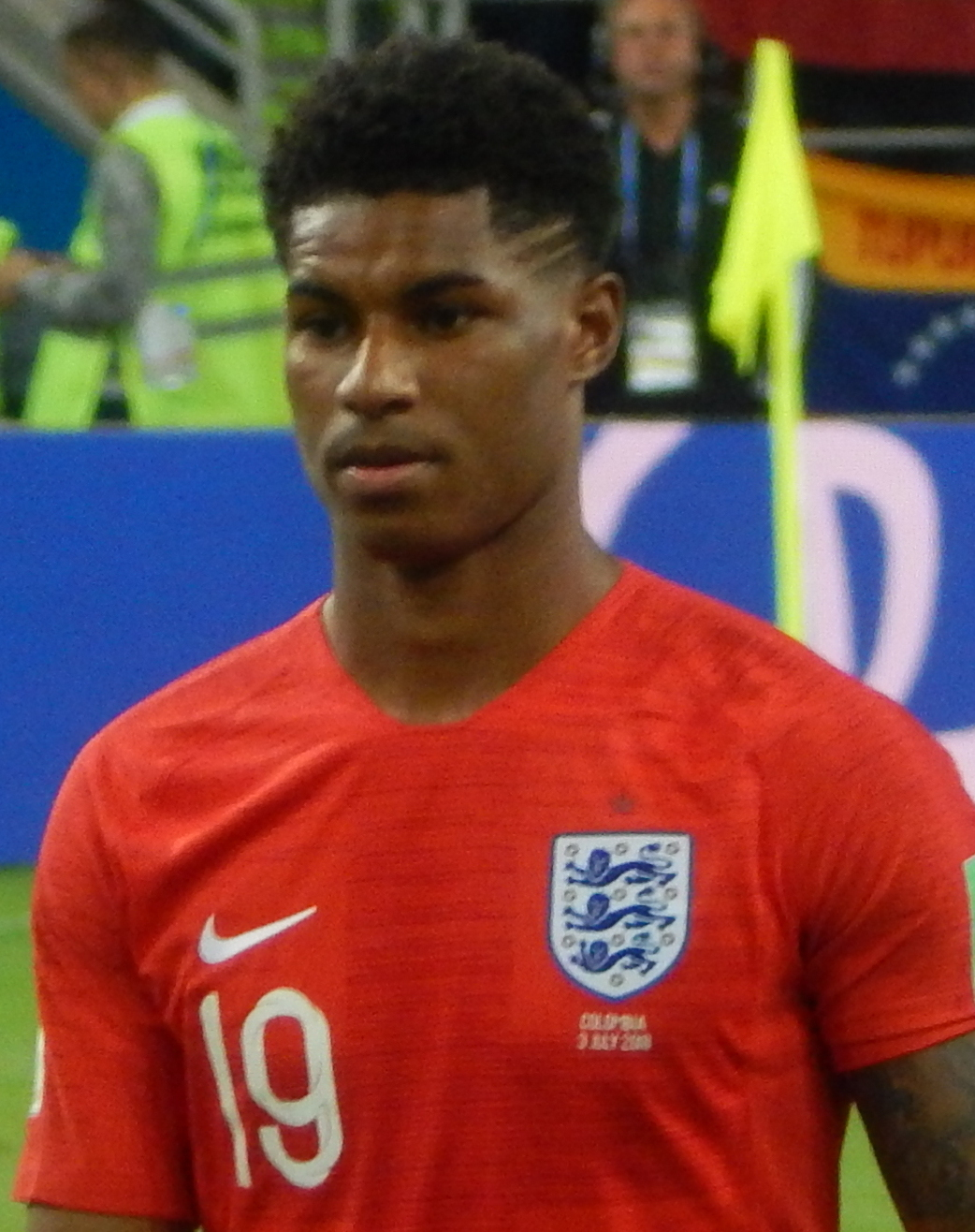
Rashford playing for England at the 2018 FIFA World Cup

On 8 September 2018, Rashford scored at Wembley in England's UEFA Nations League opener against Spain, losing 2–1. Three days later, Rashford also scored in a 1–0 friendly win over Switzerland at the King Power Stadium. The following month, he scored a goal and provided an assist in a 3–2 away win against Spain. England's final Nations League game on 18 November saw Rashford play in a 2–1 win over Croatia that saw England top their group and qualify for the Nations League finals in June 2019. His appearance in this game saw Rashford equal a national record set by Jack Charlton in 1966 by playing a total of 16 games for England throughout the year. In the semi-final, Rashford scored the opening goal of the game against the Netherlands; however, England lost 3–1 in extra time.

During the October 2019 internationals, Rashford scored his first goal in England's qualification campaign for Euro 2020 in a 6–0 away victory over Bulgaria on 14 October. Rashford also scored in both of England's November internationals, a 7–0 win over Montenegro and a 4–0 win over Kosovo. These wins saw England become the ninth team to qualify for Euro 2020. On 6 June 2021, Rashford captained England for the first time, converting a penalty in a 1–0 win against Romania; he became the youngest England captain since Michael Owen in 2003, and was the seventh Manchester United player to captain England score in the same game.

Rashford was named in the 26-man squad for UEFA Euro 2020, and was given the number 11 shirt, but going into the tournament, Rashford's role as a starter appeared in doubt. In the final against Italy on 11 July 2021, Rashford was brought on as a substitute in the final minutes of extra time. He was chosen to take the team's third penalty during the subsequent shoot-out but his effort hit the post and went wide, and Italy went on to win the tournament after saving two more penalties. After the loss, Rashford was subjected to racially abusive messages on social media, and a street mural honouring him in Withington was vandalised. Residents quickly filled the wall with hearts and messages of support for Rashford, and street artist Akse returned to restore the mural to its original form.

==== 2021–present: first tournament goals ====
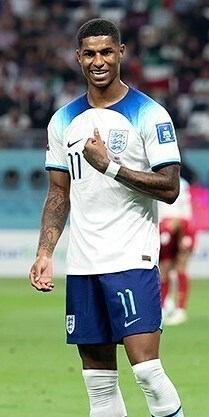
Rashford playing for England at the 2022 FIFA World Cup

After undergoing surgery on his shoulder, Rashford missed England's next squad for World Cup qualification games against Group I opponents Hungary, Andorra, and Poland, but returned to the squad for November 2021's qualification games against Albania and San Marino, before being forced to withdraw due to illness. Due to a drop in form for United during the 2021–22 season, he was not called up to the England for March 2022 friendlies against Switzerland and Ivory Coast, and again in June for four Nations League matches against Hungary, Germany, and Italy, with Southgate saying Rashford and club teammate Jadon Sancho had a lot to do to get back in the squad for the World Cup. Rashford subsequently failed to receive a call-up for England's next squad in September for the final two Nations League matches against Italy and Germany.

Despite not appearing for England since the final of the European Championships, Rashford was named in Southgate's 26-man squad for the 2022 FIFA World Cup in Qatar, and was again assigned the number 11 shirt. In England's opening game of the group stage, a 6–2 win over Iran, Rashford came on as a second-half substitute and scored within a minute of coming on, making the score 5–1. At 49 seconds, the goal was the third quickest by a substitute in World Cup history. In England's final group game, Rashford scored two goals in a 3–0 win against Wales to qualify for the knockout stage. His second was England's 100th goal in all World Cups, and meant he became only the second United player after Bobby Charlton to score three or more at a major tournament. Southgate and former England defender Gary Neville both praised him for making progress after a tough 18 months for both club and country.

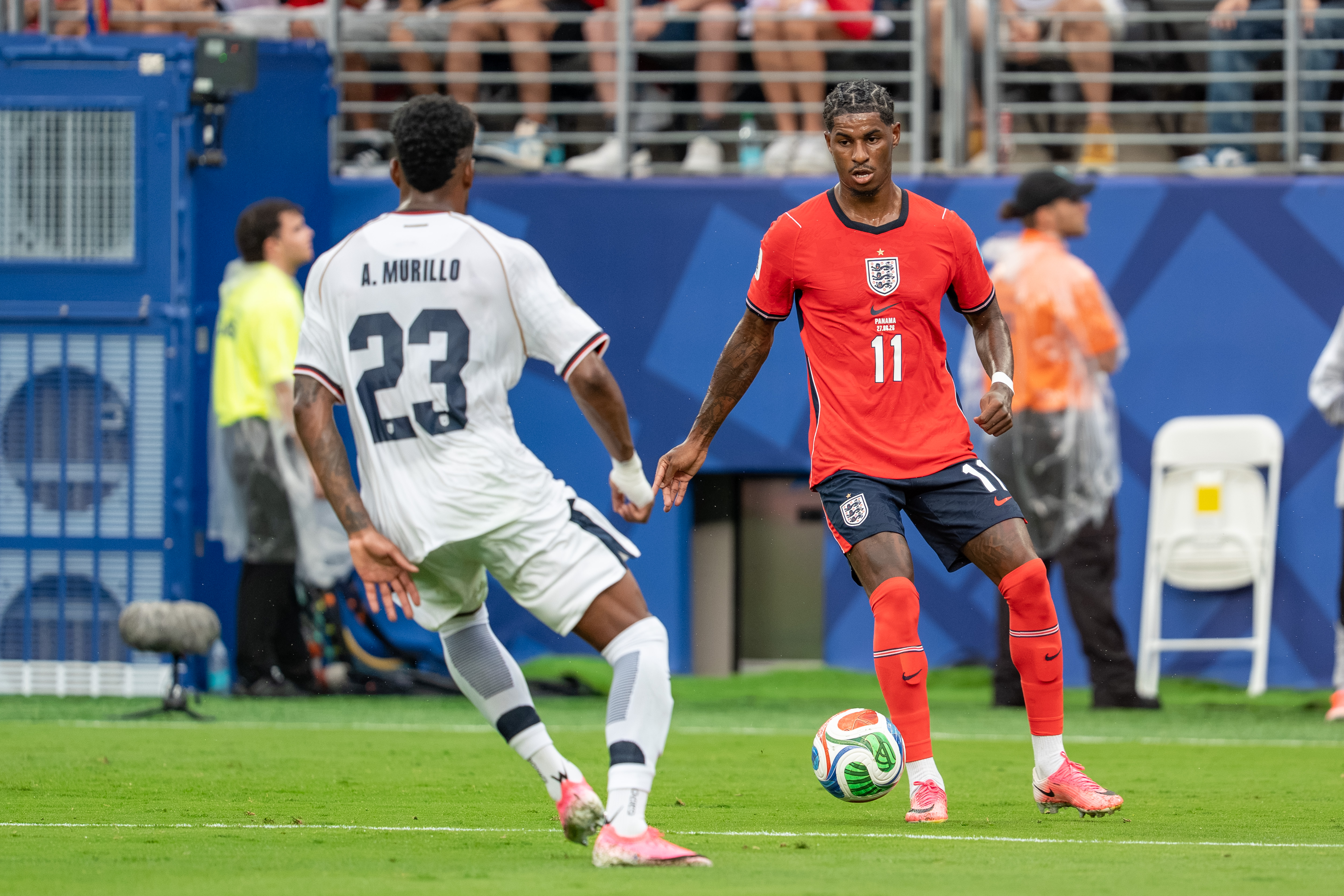
Rashford (in red) playing for England against Panama

He was left out of the preliminary England squad for UEFA Euro 2024. On 22 May 2026, Rashford was selected in the 26-man squad for the 2026 FIFA World Cup. He came on as a substitute and scored in England's opening match, a 4–2 victory over Croatia.

== Player profile ==
=== Style of play and development ===
Rashford can play as either a centre forward or a winger, primarily on the left-wing. Rashford himself prefers playing on the left, a position which allows him to cut inside and strike on goal with his stronger right foot, and likes to drop deep to collect the ball and build an attack, something he learned as a youngster when playing as a central midfielder following a battle with Osgood–Schlatter disease. In his formative years, Rashford's former youth coach Paul McGuinness noted how he was attempting to play similarly to Italian midfielder Andrea Pirlo, but he and fellow coaches Warren Joyce and Colin Little saw Rashford's potential as a striker and helped him work on his body shape and various attacking runs. They advised him to focus on being a goalscorer rather than a creative player, and to use his pace to make runs behind the defence. His coaches were reminded of Danny Welbeck due to his versatility, but it was decided to instead teach him the "art" of goalscoring, instructing him how to make runs at the right time, and was held back from playing reserve team football to give him confidence in his goalscoring abilities by pitting him against lesser defences. Rashford says his versatility can enable him to become the "ultimate centre forward".

Rashford is a pacey and direct player, and often moves to central positions to create chances and get into goalscoring positions. He constantly tests defenders both with his movement and positioning off the ball, meaning opponents often double up on him. Rashford's former United manager José Mourinho has said he is "not a target man, he is a man of movement. I do not think he is a pure nine", comments echoed by his manager with England, Gareth Southgate, who has said his ability to play with his back to goal and his hold-up play weren't his major strengths, and is better suited as a "wide raider" coming in off the wing. United captain and England compatriot Harry Maguire attributes Rashford's reputation for being a goal threat to his movement and "clever play".

Another former manager at United, Ole Gunnar Solskjær, has been credited with improving him as a player and helping him mature by giving him freedom as a winger he hadn't previously experienced. Rashford's main attributes also include his dribbling ability, and his "ruthless" finishing ability, which has been compared to that of former United striker Ruud van Nistelrooy, a player McGuinness advised him to study while they worked together in the club's academy. Rashford understands the need for a striker to be able to score different kinds of goals to be a player who can score 20 to 25 per season, and is said to be a player with composure and awareness. Rashford often takes penalties and free kicks for United, and has been known to use the knuckleball technique on set pieces, which was popularised by Cristiano Ronaldo during his first spell at the club. England teammate Phil Foden has described his striking technique as being among the "top three in the world".

His success has been credited to his drive and personal ambition both on and off the pitch, and he has been viewed as a role model for younger players due to his success at a young age. He attributes his "focus and dedication" to watching and listening to former United striker Robin van Persie, and recalls seeing pictures of former academy players such as David Beckham and Paul Scholes on the walls of Carrington, United's training centre, and being determined to reach the same level they had. McGuinness said in 2020 that Rashford was always professional and mature, and even at a young age, was described as a leader, with former United and England midfielder Owen Hargreaves saying he had the characteristics to be a captain.

Rashford has praised former teammate Zlatan Ibrahimović and Mourinho with helping improve his mentality, describing their combined influence as key to his development. He has been described as a "big game player" due to his performances and contributions in important matches, including on several débuts for club and country. Rashford has also received praise for his willingness to play on despite major injuries, with manager Solskjær saying he would "run through a brick wall for you", while his captain Harry Maguire describes him as a battler. Louis van Gaal, Rashford's first senior manager, and Fletcher Moss coach Dave Horrocks have both praised his ability to handle criticism, with van Gaal saying it was amongst his best assets.

=== Comparisons ===
Rashford is seen as a similar type of player to Thierry Henry in terms of style of play, physical attributes and end product. Van Gaal said his performances at a young age were similar to those of Patrick Kluivert, who he had managed at Ajax in the 1990s. Erik ten Hag, the United manager from the 2022–23 season, compared him to favourably to Kylian Mbappe due to the similar nature of their roles. Growing up, the player he most tried to emulate was Brazilian striker Ronaldo, having watched him score a hat-trick for Real Madrid in a Champions League quarter-final in the first match he attended live at Old Trafford. Speaking about Ronaldo, Rashford said: "I've grown up watching so much of him and his games. He always played free, and went out there and expressed himself. When you do that, that's when you play your best football."

Rashford said that Cristiano Ronaldo and Wayne Rooney were United players he idolised in his youth, having seen them join the team at an early age and watched many of their games live, and said of Ronaldo that "there is no bigger inspiration in football" after Rashford had begun his own professional career; comparisons have been made between the development of the two by Southgate, Solskjær, and McGuinness. He credits Rooney's professionalism with helping him mature in the early stages of his career, describing how he was "always ready to play and give his best", and has been tipped by Little to break Rooney's goalscoring record of 253 goals for the club. He has been described as a "student of the game", continuing to watch matches of players such as Lionel Messi and Sergio Agüero with the idea of studying and learning to improve his own game.

== Charity and activism ==
=== Food poverty campaign ===
In October 2019, Rashford set up the In the Box campaign with Selfridges to give homeless people essential items over the Christmas period, something he had wanted to do when first training with United as a youth. He and his mother visited homeless shelters to personally hand the boxes out, while also sending some to a children's home in his grandmother's home country of Saint Kitts and Nevis. He was reportedly frustrated by the limited outreach the campaign resulted in.

In March 2020, during the UK lockdown imposed by Boris Johnson's government in response to the COVID-19 pandemic, Rashford teamed up with the poverty and food waste charity FareShare to deliver meals to those in the Greater Manchester area who were no longer receiving their free school meals, as well as to children who attended community centres and school breakfast clubs. Rashford initially contacted FareShare to make a "substantial" donation, but after discussion with CEO Lindsay Boswell, he decided to provide his full support. With an initial target of supporting 400,000 children in the region, the initiative quickly raised over £20 million to provide food for children nationwide who, if still at school, would be receiving free school meals. On 11 June, Rashford said that the charity had been able to provide 3 million meals across the country, a figure that rose to 4 million the following month.

On 15 June, Rashford wrote an open letter to the UK government calling on them to end UK child poverty. A day later, the government announced a change in policy regarding the extension of free school meals for children during the summer holidays, with Rashford's campaign credited as a major turning point in governmental talks; Rashford described himself as "proud" of what he had helped accomplish on behalf of 1.3 million children. His actions were described as a "political masterclass" by The Guardian, and he was praised for countering comments made by Secretary of State for Health and Social Care Matt Hancock regarding the contributions of footballers. On 1 September, in an attempt to tackle child food poverty, Rashford announced that he had set up the Child Food Poverty Task Force in collaboration with several UK food shops, manufacturers, charities and delivery companies. Later that month, he said he was "disappointed by the lack of empathy" being shown by the Education Secretary Gavin Williamson.

After he was appointed Member of the Order of the British Empire (MBE) in October, Rashford vowed to continue his campaign, and a week later he began a petition on the UK Parliament petitions website to end child food poverty, with demands made for expansion of the free school meals programme, provision of meals and activities during school holidays, and an increase in the value of Healthy Start vouchers. The petition received over 100,000 signatures in 10 hours, meaning it had passed the threshold to be considered for parliamentary debate, and received over 200,000 signatures in the first day. With the petition close to 300,000 signatures after less than a week, Labour proposed an opposition day debate on the matter of extending free school meals, which was rejected by a majority of 61. Rashford criticised those who voted against it as lacking humanity.

Later that week, Rashford began using his Twitter account to promote cafés, individual people, charities and local businesses offering assistance to FareShare to help the impoverished around the country. He received the local backing of the Mayor of Greater Manchester Andy Burnham, and The Co-operative Group, to provide 1,000 food vouchers over half-term, which was quickly followed by councils and businesses across the North-West backing the efforts. He described himself as "blown away" by the nationwide support which followed, with over 100 businesses, charities, and local councils quickly pledging to the campaign. The same day, FareShare announced their new warehouse would be named Melanie Maynard House in honour of Rashford's mother, and it was revealed they had received donations in record numbers in the day following the Parliamentary debate. In the following days, over 1,200 had signed up to provide free meals over the half-term, and Rashford's petition became only the sixth to reach over 1 million signatures.

On 8 November 2020, it was announced that, because of Rashford's campaign, the government would be providing funding of almost £400m over the next 12 months to support the cost of food and household bills to poor families. At the end of the month, former Manchester United manager Alex Ferguson and venture capitalist Michael Moritz pledged to double any donations through a Christmas fundraising appeal set up by Rashford in conjunction with The Times newspaper, with Ferguson declaring himself "proud" of Rashford. The campaign had raised over £2.7 million by the beginning of January.

In January 2021, Rashford again used his Twitter account to begin highlighting the "unacceptable" food packages parents had received through supplier Chartwells, an offspring of Compass Group, with Johnson again pressured into conducting a review into the situation after the pair had a conversation regarding the matter. During Prime Minister's Questions on 13 January, Johnson credited Rashford as being more effective opposition than the actual Leader of the Opposition Keir Starmer, the Leader of the Labour Party at the time.

In April 2021, Rashford, along with chef Tom Kerridge, announced the launch of a series of recipes and online video lessons, which will be available each week on Instagram and on recipe cards in supermarkets, schools and food banks to provide cheap and simple recipe ideas such as spaghetti bolognese and fish finger sandwich, so that people could cook simple menus at home with the ideal that no one would go to bed feeling hungry.

==== Universal Credit campaigning ====
In October 2020, Rashford publicly questioned Chancellor of the Exchequer Rishi Sunak regarding a permanent £20 increase in Universal Credit, stressing his concern that many families would be "counting down the days" until the scheduled reversal the following April. A member of Rashford's team told The Times the permanent annual increase of £1,040 was the "missing piece" in their campaign strategy. At the end of December, it was reported by The Guardian that Rashford would have discussions with Thérèse Coffey, the Secretary of State for Work and Pensions, regarding the permanent increase in Universal Credit; Rashford had previously been critical of Coffey during the initial stages of his campaign.

==== Recognition ====
In the wake of the popularity generated by his charity work, Rashford signed with American rapper Jay-Z's entertainment agency Roc Nation in April 2020, with president Michael Yormark saying he was a "shining example" of somebody who was "passionate about community". In July 2020, he received an honorary doctorate from the University of Manchester in recognition of his work to end child poverty in the UK, becoming the youngest person to receive an honorary doctorate from the university. In October 2021, in the ceremony at which the degree was conferred (delayed because of the COVID-19 pandemic), Dame Nancy Rothwell, the Vice-Chancellor, called him "an exceptional young man who continues to demonstrate a sense of community and generosity that goes well beyond his years." In a speech in reply, he remarked that the occasion was bittersweet, because it was the day after the £20/week increase in Universal Credit made by the government in April 2020 as a temporary response to the pandemic had been withdrawn. His efforts also led to him being featured on the September cover of British Vogue's "Activism Now" edition alongside Adwoa Aboah, which he downplayed, saying that he "had a voice and a platform that could be used to at least ask the questions". In October, Rashford was appointed MBE in the 2020 Birthday Honours, and was also a recipient of the City of Manchester Award for his "outstanding and exceptional contribution to the city".

At the 2020 Pride of Britain Awards, he won the award for Special Recognition for his campaign against child food poverty. Local street artist Akse honoured Rashford with a mural of him in Withington, a suburb of Manchester where Rashford lived at the time he signed for Fletcher Moss Rangers. The Voice, the only British African-Caribbean newspaper in the United Kingdom, named Rashford on the Football Black List, an initiative designed to celebrate influential black people in football. Rashford was named as Campaigner Of The Year in the 2020 GQ Men Of The Year awards. Although not on the main category shortlist, he was the recipient of a special award at the BBC Sports Personality of the Year Award's, with a documentary airing the following night. At the annual The Best FIFA Football Awards 2020 held in December, Rashford was the inaugural winner of the FIFA Foundation Award, with the FIFA Foundation CEO Youri Djorkaeff also donating £75,000 to the charities. In November 2020, Rashford was recognised for his sporting achievements and his activism, by being included in the 2021 edition of the annual Powerlist of the 100 most influential Black Britons.

In January 2021, Rashford was awarded The Guardian Footballer of the Year, an award given to "a player who has done something remarkable, whether by overcoming adversity, helping others or setting a sporting example by acting with exceptional honesty", and was the recipient of the Football Writers' Association's (FWA) Tribute Award. In February, he was listed on Time's 100 Next list, selected as an "advocate", and in April was named as part of Forbes's 30 Under 30, Europe Sports & Games for showcasing "impactful leadership". The following month, Rashford became the youngest person to be ranked number one in the Sunday Times Giving List, the newspaper's annual measure of "the generosity of those financially best equipped to make a difference".

In April 2021, Rashford received an award from the National Education Union for his work in campaigning for free school meals.

In 2023, Rashford's continued political influence led him to be ranked 42nd on the New Statesman's Left Power List 2023, described by the paper as a "one-man opposition party" that reimagined the role of the celebrity activist.

=== Literacy campaign ===
For the 2020 World Book Day, Rashford supported a campaign to help share a million stories. He also agreed to judge a poetry competition for children with hearing impairments, and began learning sign language in preparation.

In November, he teamed with Macmillan Publishers to launch a book club to help vulnerable and underprivileged children experience the "escapism of reading", with Rashford saying that reading shouldn't be something a family should have to budget for. Under the partnership, Rashford released a non-fiction motivational children's book called You Are A Champion, which won Book of the Year at the British Book Awards in 2022. The book club was formally launched in April 2021, with the intention of freely distributing 50,000 books, while the club will release two new books a year.

== Personal life ==
In May 2022, Rashford announced his engagement to girlfriend Lucia Loi. They had been dating since meeting in school, and briefly split in 2021 before reconciling. However, it was announced that they had separated in June 2023.

Rashford is Christian, and has said, "The faith we have in God is shown by the people that we are." He has also talked about his values and how his mother impacted him: "The rules and the respect we had for each other. For my whole upbringing, she was the leader in that".

He enjoys playing on PlayStation games consoles, and listens to rap and grime music, naming Dave as among his favourite artists. The pair linked for the 2022 advertisement Never Beaten for Beats.

In 2023, Nike released a pair of signature Rashford boots.

== Career statistics ==
=== Club ===
As of match played 13 October 2026

Appearances and goals by club, season and competition
Club	Season	League			National cup (Note: Includes FA Cup, Copa del Rey)		League cup (Note: Includes EFL Cup)		Europe		Other		Total	
Club	Season	Division	Apps	Goals	Apps	Goals	Apps	Goals	Apps	Goals	Apps	Goals	Apps	Goals
Manchester United	2015–16	Premier League	11	5	4	1	0	0	3 (Note: Appearances in UEFA Europa League)	2	—		18	8
Manchester United	2016–17	Premier League	32	5	3	3	6	1	11	2	1 (Note: Appearance in FA Community Shield)	0	53	11
Manchester United	2017–18	Premier League	35	7	5	1	3	2	8 (Note: Appearance(s) in UEFA Champions League)	3	1 (Note: Appearance in UEFA Super Cup)	0	52	13
Manchester United	2018–19	Premier League	33	10	4	1	0	0	10	2	—		47	13
Manchester United	2019–20	Premier League	31	17	4	0	3	4	6	1	—		44	22
Manchester United	2020–21	Premier League	37	11	3	1	4	1	13 (Note: Six appearances and six goals in UEFA Champions League, seven appearances and two goals in UEFA Europa League)	8	—		57	21
Manchester United	2021–22	Premier League	25	4	2	0	0	0	5	1	—		32	5
Manchester United	2022–23	Premier League	35	17	6	1	6	6	9	6	—		56	30
Manchester United	2023–24	Premier League	33	7	5	1	1	0	4	0	—		43	8
Manchester United	2024–25	Premier League	15	4	0	0	2	2	6	1	1	0	24	7
Manchester United	2026–27	Premier League	6	0	0	0	1	0	1	0	—		8	0
Manchester United	Total		293	87	36	9	26	16	76	26	3	0	434	138
Aston Villa (loan)	2024–25	Premier League	10	2	3	2	—		4	0	—		17	4
Barcelona (loan)	2025–26	La Liga	32	8	4	1	—		11	5	2 (Note: Appearances in Supercopa de España)	0	49	14
Career total			335	97	43	12	26	16	91	31	5	0	500	156

=== International ===
As of match played 18 July 2026

Appearances and goals by national team and year
National team	Year	Apps	Goals
England	2016	6	1
England	2017	9	1
England	2018	16	4
England	2019	7	4
England	2020	2	1
England	2021	6	1
England	2022	5	3
England	2023	8	2
England	2024	1	0
England	2025	8	1
England	2026	10	1
Total		78	19

As of match played 18 July 2026
England score listed first, score column indicates score after each Rashford goal

List of international goals scored by Marcus Rashford
No.	Date	Venue	Cap	Opponent	Score	Result	Competition	Ref.
1	27 May 2016	Stadium of Light, Sunderland, England	1	Australia	1–0	2–1	Friendly	
2	4 September 2017	Wembley Stadium, London, England	11	Slovakia	2–1	2–1	2018 FIFA World Cup qualification	
3	7 June 2018	Elland Road, Leeds, England	19	Costa Rica	1–0	2–0	Friendly	
4	8 September 2018	Wembley Stadium, London, England	26	Spain	1–0	1–2	2018–19 UEFA Nations League A	
5	11 September 2018	King Power Stadium, Leicester, England	27	Switzerland	1–0	1–0	Friendly	
6	15 October 2018	Estadio Benito Villamarín, Seville, Spain	29	Spain	2–0	3–2	2018–19 UEFA Nations League A	
7	6 June 2019	Estádio D. Afonso Henriques, Guimarães, Portugal	32	Netherlands	1–0	1–3 (a.e.t.)	2019 UEFA Nations League Finals	
8	14 October 2019	Vasil Levski National Stadium, Sofia, Bulgaria	36	Bulgaria	1–0	6–0	UEFA Euro 2020 qualifying	
9	14 November 2019	Wembley Stadium, London, England	37	Montenegro	4–0	7–0	UEFA Euro 2020 qualifying	
10	17 November 2019	Fadil Vokrri Stadium, Pristina, Kosovo	38	Kosovo	3–0	4–0	UEFA Euro 2020 qualifying	
11	11 October 2020	Wembley Stadium, London, England	39	Belgium	1–1	2–1	2020–21 UEFA Nations League A	
12	6 June 2021	Riverside Stadium, Middlesbrough, England	41	Romania	1–0	1–0	Friendly	
13	21 November 2022	Khalifa International Stadium, Doha, Qatar	47	Iran	5–1	6–2	2022 FIFA World Cup	
14	29 November 2022	Ahmad bin Ali Stadium, Al Rayyan, Qatar	49	Wales	1–0	3–0	2022 FIFA World Cup	
15	29 November 2022	Ahmad bin Ali Stadium, Al Rayyan, Qatar	49	Wales	3–0	3–0	2022 FIFA World Cup	
16	19 June 2023	Old Trafford, Manchester, England	53	North Macedonia	3–0	7–0	UEFA Euro 2024 qualifying	
17	17 October 2023	Wembley Stadium, London, England	57	Italy	2–1	3–1	UEFA Euro 2024 qualifying	
18	9 September 2025	Red Star Stadium, Belgrade, Serbia	64	Serbia	5–0	5–0	2026 FIFA World Cup qualification	
19	17 June 2026	AT&T Stadium, Arlington, United States	73	Croatia	4–2	4–2	2026 FIFA World Cup	

== Honours ==
Manchester United

- FA Cup: 2015–16, 2023–24; runner-up: 2017–18, 2022–23
- EFL Cup: 2016–17, 2022–23
- FA Community Shield: 2016
- UEFA Europa League: 2016–17; runner-up: 2020–21

Barcelona

- La Liga: 2025–26
- Supercopa de España: 2026

England

- UEFA European Championship runner-up: 2020
- FIFA World Cup third place: 2026
- UEFA Nations League third place: 2018–19

Individual

- Jimmy Murphy Young Player of the Year: 2015–16
- Premier League Player of the Month: January 2019, September 2022, January 2023, February 2023
- Premier League Goal of the Month: March 2024
- PFA Premier League Fans' Player of the Year: 2022–23
- PFA Premier League Fans' Player of the Month: December 2019, February 2023
- PFA Community Champion Award: 2019–20
- Premier League Academy Graduate of the Year Award: 2019–20
- UEFA Europa League Team of the Season: 2019–20, 2022–23
- UEFA Europa League top scorer: 2022–23
- Manchester United Goal of the Season: 2019–20 (vs. Chelsea, 30 October 2019)
- Manchester United Players' Player of the Year: 2022–23
- Sir Matt Busby Player of the Year: 2022–23
- PFA Merit Award: 2020
- FIFA Foundation Award: 2020
- The Guardian Footballer of the Year: 2020
- FWA Tribute Award: 2020
- FIFPro Merit Award: 2020
- Time 100 Next: 2021
- Pat Tillman Award for Service: 2021
- La Liga Goal of the Month: April 2026

Orders and special awards

- Member of the Order of the British Empire: 2020
- Campaigner Of The Year in the 2020 GQ Men Of The Year
- Expert Panel Special Award in the 2020 BBC Sports Personality of the Year
- Lockdown Heroes (Special Recognition) in the 2020 FSA Awards
- Honorary Doctorate Degree from the University of Manchester, October 2021
