= 2016 EMF EURO =

Tournament details
- Host country: Hungary
- Dates: 21–27 August
- Teams: 32
- Venue: 1 (in 1 host city)

Final positions
- Champions: Kazakhstan (1st title)
- Runners-up: Croatia
- Third place: Czech Republic
- Fourth place: Montenegro

Tournament statistics
- Matches played: 64
- Goals scored: 274 (4.28 per match)
- Top scorer: (Germany) Dominic Reinold (7)
- Best player: (England) Lucas Toti

The 2016 EMF Euro is the seventh edition of the EMF miniEURO for national Small-sided football teams, and the fifth governed by the European Minifootball Federation. It is hosted in Székesfehérvár, Hungary, from 21 to 27 August 2016.

The final tournament was contested by 32 teams.

== Draw ==
The final tournament draw was held in Székesfehérvár on 24 February 2016.

== Group stage ==
Key to colours in group tables
Team advanced to the knockout stage

=== Group A ===
Team	Pld	W	D	L	GF	GA	GD	Pts
Slovenia	3	2	0	1	8	3	+5	6
Hungary	3	2	0	1	6	4	+2	6
Serbia	3	2	0	1	4	5	−1	6
Turkey	3	0	0	3	3	9	−6	0

21 August 2016
17:30

Hungary	1–0	Slovenia
Attila Nagy 26'	Report

Székesfehérvár
22 August 2016
15:00

Turkey	0–1	Serbia
	Report	Nemanja Jovanović 14'

Székesfehérvár
23 August 2016
13:00

Serbia	1–4	Slovenia
Milan Tošić 9'	Report	Jaka Bizjak 35', 40'; Alen Zečević 30'; Boštjan Klemenčič 33'

Székesfehérvár
23 August 2016
20:00

Hungary	4–2	Turkey
Róbert Fekete 12', 14'; Attila Héger 10'; Attila Nagy 25'	Report	Kaan Gülay 32'; Berkan Koç 38'

Székesfehérvár
24 August 2016
18:00

Hungary	1–2	Serbia
Csaba Varga 38'	Report	Nemanja Gvozdenović 31'; Miloš Ristanović 40'

Székesfehérvár
24 August 2016
21:00

Slovenia	4–1	Turkey
Boštjan Klemenčič 7', 23'; Jaka Bizjak 5'; Rok Rednak 21'	Report	Oğulcan Yetiş 35'

Székesfehérvár

=== Group B ===
Team	Pld	W	D	L	GF	GA	GD	Pts
Germany	3	3	0	0	18	2	+16	9
Moldova	3	2	0	1	13	1	+12	6
Israel	3	1	0	2	8	8	0	3
Luxembourg	3	0	0	3	3	31	−28	0

22 August 2016
13:00

Moldova	11–0	Luxembourg
Igor Caraslov 17', 19', 32'; Valuta Eduard 4', 28'; Alexander Balsacov 20', 25'; Serghei Namasco 36', 39'; Alexander Namasco 17'; 3' (o.g.)	Report

Székesfehérvár
22 August 2016
22:00

Germany	3–2	Israel
Dominic Reinold 12', 33'; Tigin Yaglioglu 37'	Report	Alek Stunis 1'; Sharon Adani 26'

Székesfehérvár
23 August 2016
21:00

Moldova	2–0	Israel
Valuta Eduard 35', 40'	Report

Székesfehérvár
24 August 2016
20:00

Germany	14–0	Luxembourg
D. Reinold 12', 23', 30', 40'; Dominik Rittscher 10', 16', 24'; Florian Thamm 11', 32', 39'; Tigin Yaglioglu 4'; Florian Graberg 7'; Gerbi Kaplan 18'; 29' (o.g.)	Report

Székesfehérvár
25 August 2016
15:00

Germany	1–0	Moldova
Florian Thamm 9'	Report

Székesfehérvár
25 August 2016
20:00

Israel	6–3	Luxembourg
Amit Kamhazi 1', 25'; Sharon Adani 3'; Liran Elmalam 24'; Alek Stunis 28'; Amit Sharabi 31'	Report	Patrick Rodrigues 17', 20'; Christopher da Graca 38'

Székesfehérvár

=== Group C ===
Team	Pld	W	D	L	GF	GA	GD	Pts
Russia	3	3	0	0	16	1	+15	9
Poland	3	2	0	1	8	3	+5	6
Estonia	3	1	0	2	5	6	−1	3
Italy	3	0	0	3	2	21	−19	0

21 August 2016
18:30

Russia	11–0	Italy
Aleksei Medvedev 3', 9'; Evgeny Aldonin 4', 10'; Erik Korchagin 19', 21'; Sergey Faustov 38', 39'; Aleksandr Kuksov 23'; Mikhail Merkulov 27'; Viktor Bukievskii 33'	Report

Székesfehérvár
22 August 2016
17:00

Poland	2–0	Estonia
Tomasz Golatowski 14'; Bartłomiej Dębicki 16'	Report

Székesfehérvár
23 August 2016
11:00

Poland	6–2	Italy
B. Dębicki 4', 15', 21', 24'; Michał Knajdrowski 30'; 29' (o.g.)	Report	Igor Grecea 14', 39'

Székesfehérvár
23 August 2016
12:00

Russia	4–1	Estonia
Aleksei Medvedev 38', 39'; Aleksandr Kuksov 18'; Sergey Faustov 28'	Report	Jevgeni Larin 25'

Székesfehérvár
24 August 2016
17:00

Russia	1–0	Poland
Sergey Faustov 10'	Report

Székesfehérvár
25 August 2016
22:00

Italy	0–4	Estonia
	Report	Vitali Leitan 2'; Igor Ivanov 24'; Maksim Babjak 32'; Juri Amosov 39'

Székesfehérvár

=== Group D ===
Team	Pld	W	D	L	GF	GA	GD	Pts
Romania	3	2	1	0	6	3	+3	7
Spain	3	1	1	1	5	5	0	4
Lithuania	3	1	0	2	5	7	−2	3
France	3	1	0	2	6	7	−1	3

22 August 2016
20:00

Romania	3–1	France
Marian Radu Burciu 22', 30'; Andrei Bogdan Chiper 9'	Report	Elle Dohin 3'

Székesfehérvár
22 August 2016
21:00

Spain	3–1	Lithuania
Cristian Urbistondo 11'; Cristian Hurtado Guillamon 27'; 6' (o.g.)	Report	Pavelas Smolkovas 18'

Székesfehérvár
23 August 2016
17:00

Romania	2–1	Lithuania
Marian Radu Burciu 9'; Gabriel Tanase 12'	Report	Edvinas Mucinis 37'

Székesfehérvár
24 August 2016
14:00

Spain	1–3	France
Patricio Diaz 8'	Report	Elie Dohin 6'; Romain Labaig 26'; Kevin Gastou 29'

Székesfehérvár
25 August 2016
14:00

France	2–3	Lithuania
Elie Dohin 28'; Nicolas Huertos 32'	Report	Justinas Zagurskas 18'; Edvinas Mucinis 26'; Pavelas Smolkovas 36'

Székesfehérvár
25 August 2016
18:00

Romania	1–1	Spain
Vasile Sebastian Petrisor 34'	Report	Gabriel Ruiz Vicente 40'

Székesfehérvár

=== Group E ===
Team	Pld	W	D	L	GF	GA	GD	Pts
Czech Republic	3	3	0	0	12	1	+11	9
Wales	3	1	0	2	5	10	−5	3
Portugal	3	1	0	2	5	8	−3	3
Bulgaria	3	1	0	2	3	6	−3	3

22 August 2016
16:00

Czech Republic	5–1	Portugal
Ondřej Paděra 2', 32', 36', 38'; Marek Gruber 11'	Report	Carlos Miguel Vinhas 35'

Székesfehérvár
22 August 2016
18:00

Bulgaria	1–4	Wales
32' (o.g.)	Report	Josef Hopkins 16', 39'; Cullen Kinsella 29', 34'

Székesfehérvár
24 August 2016
13:00

Bulgaria	2–1	Portugal
Radomir Todorov 3'; Latin Venkov 29'	Report	9' (o.g.)

Székesfehérvár
24 August 2016
16:00

Czech Republic	6–0	Wales
Stanislav Mařík 23', 34'; Ondřej Bíro 7'; Tomáš Kounovsky 19'; Jan Koudelka 38'; Robin Demeter 39'	Report

Székesfehérvár
25 August 2016
16:00

Czech Republic	1–0	Bulgaria
Tomáš Kounovský 39'	Report

Székesfehérvár
25 August 2016
19:00

Portugal	3–1	Wales
Fábio Teixeira 3'; Rogério Ferreira 15'; José Carlos Ferreira 28'	Report	Josef Hopkins 20'

Székesfehérvár

=== Group F ===
Team	Pld	W	D	L	GF	GA	GD	Pts
Croatia	3	2	1	0	12	2	+10	7
England	3	2	0	1	7	5	+2	6
Greece	3	1	1	1	7	3	+4	4
Cyprus	3	0	0	3	1	17	−16	0

21 August 2016
19:30

Croatia	1–1	Greece
Antun Hercigonja 41'	Report	Christos Ntoumos 39'

Székesfehérvár
22 August 2016
14:00

England	4–1	Cyprus
Rob Ursell 8', 13'; Kirk Herbert 5'; Lucas Toti 11'	Report	12' (o.g.)

Székesfehérvár
23 August 2016
19:00

England	2–0	Greece
Kirk Herbert 12'; Lucas Toti 41'	Report

Székesfehérvár
23 August 2016
22:00

Croatia	7–0	Cyprus
Matija Ezgeta 4', 30'; Ivan Smok 20', 37'; Zoran Lukavečki 29'; Antun Hercigonja 32'; Željko Šimić 34'	Report

Székesfehérvár
24 August 2016
19:00

Croatia	4–1	England
Ivan Smok 10'; Bruno Piskać 24'; Tin Prpić 30'; Antun Hercigonja 39'	Report	Scott Cousins 38'

Székesfehérvár
25 August 2016
13:00

Greece	6–0	Cyprus
Georgios Konstantagas 12', 22'; Dionisios Tzanetos 27', 31'; Michail Kefakis 14'; Chrysanthos Lefkaritis 30'	Report

Székesfehérvár

=== Group G ===
Team	Pld	W	D	L	GF	GA	GD	Pts
Kazakhstan	3	3	0	0	8	2	+6	9
Montenegro	3	2	0	1	7	5	+2	6
Latvia	3	1	0	2	7	10	−3	3
Austria	3	0	0	3	4	9	−5	0

21 August 2016
20:30

Montenegro	2–1	Austria
Danilo Vulević 33', 35'	Report	Damir Jovanović 39'

Székesfehérvár
22 August 2016
12:00

Kazakhstan	3–1	Latvia
Darkhan Yussupov 1', 28'; Anuar Tokenov 39'	Report	Valerijs Čistjakovs 33'

Székesfehérvár
23 August 2016
15:00

Kazakhstan	2–0	Austria
Darkhan Yussupov 3'; Kuanysh Abdualiyev 16'	Report

Székesfehérvár
23 August 2016
16:00

Montenegro	4–1	Latvia
Aleksandar Nenadović 29', 34'; Aleksandar Simić 15'; Nemanja Kljajević 39'	Report	Aleksejs Lavrenovs 39'

Székesfehérvár
24 August 2016
15:00

Austria	3–5	Latvia
Manuel Stranz 30', 31'; Dino Ćesović 13'	Report	Aleksejs Lavrenovs 19', 36'; Dmitrijs Prohorovs 3'; Sergejs Oleškovs 6'; Valerijs Čistjakovs 35'

Székesfehérvár
25 August 2016
17:00

Montenegro	1–3	Kazakhstan
Aleksandar Simić 30'	Report	Murat Akhmetsharipov 13'; Assan Barlybayev 34'; 15' (o.g.)

Székesfehérvár

=== Group H ===
Team	Pld	W	D	L	GF	GA	GD	Pts
Bosnia and Herzegovina	3	3	0	0	7	3	+4	9
Slovakia	3	1	1	1	4	4	0	4
Scotland	3	1	1	1	4	4	0	4
Ukraine	3	0	0	3	2	6	−4	0

22 August 2016
11:00

Bosnia and Herzegovina	2–1	Ukraine
Andreas Berović 13', 31'	Report	Igor Kladov 40'

Székesfehérvár
22 August 2016
19:00

Slovakia	1–1	Scotland
Michal Kučera 18'	Report	Lee Wells 33'

Székesfehérvár
23 August 2016
14:00

Slovakia	1–0	Ukraine
Stanislav Krempasky 36'	Report

Székesfehérvár
23 August 2016
18:00

Bosnia and Herzegovina	2–0	Scotland
Andreas Berović 12'; Josip Kupreškić 31'	Report

Székesfehérvár
24 August 2016
22:00

Scotland	3–1	Ukraine
Joe Andrew 15'; Ian Anderson 27'; Blair Steele 30'	Report	Igor Kladov 18'

Székesfehérvár
25 August 2016
21:00

Bosnia and Herzegovina	3–2	Slovakia
Marin Jukić 12', 23'; Marko Vujica 25'	Report	Ľudovít Félix 34', 36'

Székesfehérvár

== Knockout stage ==
=== Bracket ===
Round of 16
26 August, 10:00
Czech Republic	5
Poland	2
26 August, 11:00
Romania	2
England	3
26 August, 14:00
Germany	2 (2)
Slovakia	2 (0)
26 August, 16:00
Kazakhstan	5
Hungary	1
26 August, 12:00
Slovenia	3
Wales	5
26 August, 13:00
Croatia	4
Moldova	0
26 August, 15:00
Russia	2 (0)
Montenegro	2 (2)
26 August, 17:00
Bosnia and Herzegovina	0 (3)
Spain	0 (1)

Quarter-finals
26 August, 19:00
Czech Republic	3
England	2
26 August, 21:00
Germany	1 (2)
Kazakhstan	1 (3)
26 August, 20:00
Wales	0
Croatia	4
26 August, 22:00
Montenegro	0 (3)
Bosnia and Herzegovina	0 (2)

Semi-finals
27 August, 11:00
Czech Republic	0
Kazakhstan	3
27 August, 12:00
Croatia	3
Montenegro	1

Final
27 August, 21:00
Kazakhstan	2 (6)
Croatia	2 (5)
Third place
27 August, 19:30
Czech Republic	2
Montenegro	0

=== Round of 16 ===
26 August 2016
10:00

Czech Republic	5–2	Poland
Tomáš Kounovský 9'; Patrik Levčík 19'; David Macko 22'; Stanislav Mařík 23'; Jan Koudelka 38'	Report	Norbert Jendruczek 35'; Bartłomiej Dębicki 36'

Székesfehérvár
26 August 2016
11:00

Romania	2–3	England
Vincene Toma 10', 38'	Report	Sam Murphy 8'; Lucas Toti 18'; Kirk Herbert 40'

Székesfehérvár
26 August 2016
12:00

Slovenia	3–5	Wales
Jaka Bizjak 6', 29'; 15' (o.g.)	Report	Cullen Kinsella 3', 14'; Josef Hopkins 18'; Laurent Mondo 35'; Tyron Topper 41'

Székesfehérvár
26 August 2016
13:00

Croatia	4–0	Moldova
Matija Ezgeta 14'; Antun Hercigonja 19'; Bruno Piskać 23'; Branimir Ceboci 39'	Report

Székesfehérvár
26 August 2016
14:00

Germany	3–3 (penalty: 2–0)	Slovakia
Dominik Rittscher 12'; Micha Alexander 15'; Florian Thamm 41'	Report	Stanislav Krempasky 2'; Ľudovít Félix 4'; Erik Szabo 37'

Székesfehérvár
26 August 2016
16:00

Kazakhstan	5–1	Hungary
Kanat Zhumabekov 5', 40'; Kuanysh Abdualiyev 35'; Assan Barlybayev 37'; Amangeldy Dyussembayev 40'	Report	Zsolt Szabó 19'

Székesfehérvár
26 August 2016
15:00

Russia	2–2 (penalty: 0–2)	Montenegro
Evgeny Aldonin 6'; Aleksei Medvedev 23'	Report	Aleksandar Mikijelj 5'; Aleksandar Simić 19'

Székesfehérvár
26 August 2016
17:00

Bosnia and Herzegovina	0–0 (penalty: 3–1)	Spain
	Report

Székesfehérvár

=== Quarter-finals ===
26 August 2016
19:00

Czech Republic	3–2	England
Tomáš Kounovský 3'; David Macko 10'; Michal Uhlíř 26'	Report	Lucas Toti 4'; Kirk Herbert 22'

Székesfehérvár
26 August 2016
20:00

Wales	0–4	Croatia
	Report	Tin Prpić 4'; Zoran Lukavečki 5'; Bruno Piskać 21'; Branimir Ceboci 32'

Székesfehérvár
26 August 2016
21:00

Germany	1–1 (penalty: 2–3)	Kazakhstan
Dominic Reinold 14'	Report	Assan Barlybayev 26'

Székesfehérvár
26 August 2016
22:00

Montenegro	0–0 (penalty: 3–2)	Bosnia and Herzegovina
	Report

Székesfehérvár

=== Semi finals ===
27 August 2016
11:00

Czech Republic	0–3	Kazakhstan
	Report	Murat Akhmetsharipov 12'; Assan Barlybayev 26'; Zhassulan Mustafin 38'

Székesfehérvár
27 August 2016
12:00

Croatia	3–1	Montenegro
Bruno Piskać 18'; Tin Prpić 19'; Antun Hercigonja 38'	Report	Aleksandar Nenadović 23'

Székesfehérvár

=== Bronze medal game ===
27 August 2016
19:30

Czech Republic	2–0	Montenegro
Ondřej Paděra 19'; Tomáš Kounovský 33'	Report

Székesfehérvár

=== Final ===
27 August 2016
21:00

Kazakhstan	2–2 (penalty: 6–5)	Croatia
Murat Akhmetsharipov 3', 23'	Report	Željko Šimić 2'; Ivan Smok 19'

Székesfehérvár

== Final ranking ==
Pos	Team	Pld	W	D	L	GF	GA	GD	Pts	Result
1	Kazakhstan	7	5	2	0	19	6	+13	17	1st
2	Croatia	6	5	1	0	25	5	+20	16	2nd
3	Czech Republic	7	6	0	1	22	8	+14	18	3rd
4	Montenegro	6	2	2	2	10	12	−2	8	4th
5	Germany	5	3	2	0	21	5	+16	11	Eliminated in the quarter-finals
6	Bosnia and Herzegovina	5	3	2	0	7	3	+4	11	Eliminated in the quarter-finals
7	England	5	3	0	2	12	10	+2	9	Eliminated in the quarter-finals
8	Wales	5	2	0	3	10	17	−7	6	Eliminated in the quarter-finals
9	Russia	4	3	1	0	18	3	+15	10	Eliminated in the round of 16
10	Romania	4	2	1	1	8	6	+2	7	Eliminated in the round of 16
11	Moldova	5	2	0	3	13	5	+8	6	Eliminated in the round of 16
12	Poland	4	2	0	2	8	10	−2	6	Eliminated in the round of 16
13	Slovenia	4	2	0	2	11	8	+3	6	Eliminated in the round of 16
14	Hungary	4	2	0	2	7	9	−2	6	Eliminated in the round of 16
15	Slovakia	4	1	2	1	6	6	0	5	Eliminated in the round of 16
16	Spain	4	1	2	1	5	5	0	5	Eliminated in the round of 16
17	Serbia	3	2	0	1	4	5	−1	6	
18	Greece	3	1	1	1	7	3	+4	4	
19	Scotland	3	1	1	1	4	4	0	4	Eliminated in the group stage
20	Israel	3	1	0	2	8	8	0	3	Eliminated in the group stage
21	France	3	1	0	2	6	7	−1	3	Eliminated in the group stage
22	Estonia	3	1	0	2	5	6	−1	3	Eliminated in the group stage
23	Lithuania	3	1	0	2	5	7	−2	3	Eliminated in the group stage
24	Latvia	3	1	0	2	7	10	−3	3	Eliminated in the group stage
25	Portugal	3	1	0	2	5	8	−3	3	Eliminated in the group stage
26	Bulgaria	3	1	0	2	3	6	−3	3	Eliminated in the group stage
27	Ukraine	3	0	0	3	2	6	−4	0	Eliminated in the group stage
28	Austria	3	0	0	3	4	9	−5	0	Eliminated in the group stage
29	Turkey	3	0	0	3	3	9	−6	0	Eliminated in the group stage
30	Cyprus	3	0	0	3	1	17	−16	0	Eliminated in the group stage
31	Italy	3	0	0	3	2	21	−19	0	Eliminated in the group stage
32	Luxembourg	3	0	0	3	3	31	−28	0	Eliminated in the group stage
