= Indoor football =

Indoor football may refer to:

== American football ==
- Arena football, indoor variant of American football

== Association football ==
- Indoor soccer, a variant of association football played indoors
- Five-a-side football, another variant of association football often played indoors
- Futsal, another association football variant played indoors
