= Mural of Marcus Rashford =

Mural in Withington, Manchester, United Kingdom

- Marcus Rashford
- Artist: Akse P19
- Completion date: 10 November 2020
- Medium: Paint
- Movement: Street art
- Subject: Marcus Rashford
- Dimensions: 5 m × 15 m (16 ft × 49 ft)
- Location: Withington, Manchester, United Kingdom; 53.4340408°N 2.229962°W
- Owner: Withington Walls
- Preceded by: George Floyd (2020)
- Followed by: Captain Tom (2021)
- Website: Website

In 2020, a mural of footballer Marcus Rashford by street artist Akse P19 was painted in the Withington area of Manchester, United Kingdom. The mural was created in recognition of the work Rashford did during the COVID-19 pandemic in the United Kingdom to help tackle child food poverty.

After Rashford had missed a penalty kick for England in the UEFA Euro 2020 Final in July 2021, the mural was vandalised, prompting locals to post messages of support for Rashford before its restoration.

== Description ==
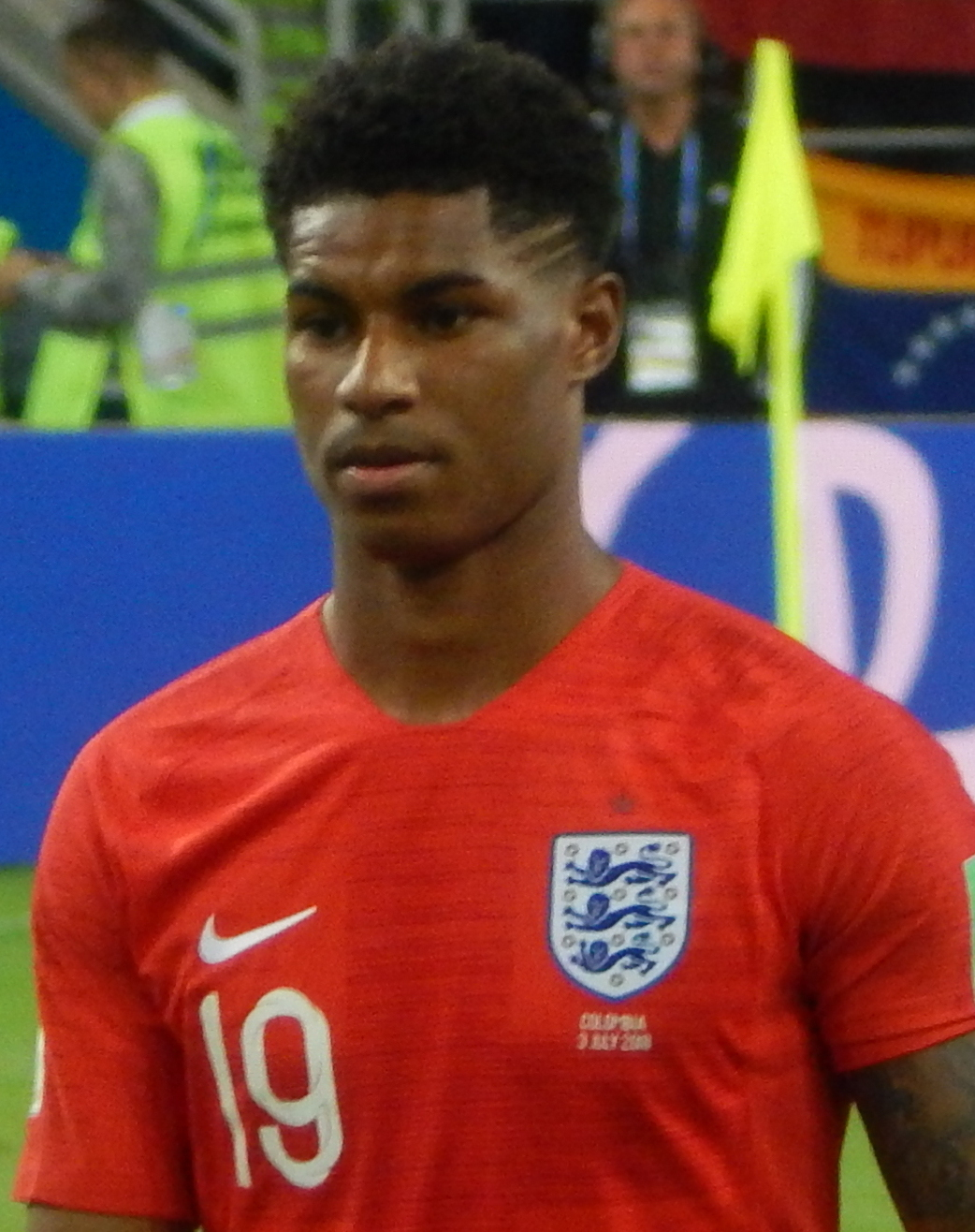
Marcus Rashford, 2018

Based on a photograph by Daniel Cheetham, the painting of Marcus Rashford was completed in 2020 by street artist Akse, in collaboration with the street art project Withington Walls, to commemorate the footballer's work to reduce child hunger. The mural is a black and white portrait painting, and appears on an exterior wall of Coffee House Café on Copson Street, near where Rashford was raised in Old Moat. The mural's quote, which reads, "Take pride in knowing that your struggle will play the biggest role in your purpose", was taken from a letter Marcus wrote to his 10-year-old self, later published as part of a campaign with Burberry to fund youth centres.

== History ==
Aske spoke with Rashford while completing the artwork in November 2020 and said, "I hope the mural will inspire the local community as he has inspired the whole nation with his campaign to fight child food poverty." To celebrate Black History Month in 2021, a close-up of the mural was featured on Google Street View.

=== Vandalism ===
The painting was vandalised with the words "shite in a bucket, bastard", "fuck Sancho", and "fuck Saka" after those players and Rashford failed to score in a penalty shootout for England in the UEFA Euro 2020 Final, which meant Italy won the shootout 3–2. The Mayor of Greater Manchester, Andy Burnham, described the mural defacement as a "despicable, shameful act". Ed Wellard, co-founder of Withington Walls, worked to cover the profanity immediately; residents created a collage of supportive messages, flags, and hearts across the artwork, and Akse restored the mural. On 16 July, Manchester City Council announced plans to preserve the items left at the mural following the vandalism. A representative of the council described the public's response as a "Manchester moment we will all remember and should not forget", and BT created a virtual replication of the messages named the "Wall of Hope".

A spokesperson for Greater Manchester Police (GMP) said, "While the content of the vandalism is not believed to be of a racial nature, officers are keeping an open mind as to the motive behind defacing the artwork". Hundreds of people participated in an anti-racism demonstration at the mural, leaving Rashford "lost for words". Rashford was moved by the messages of support. He shared images of the collage and tweeted, "The communities that wrapped their arms around me continue to hold me up... I can take critique of my performance all day long... but I will never apologise for who I am and where I came from." In October 2021, GMP released CCTV footage of a hooded man within the vicinity of the mural at 23:40 BST on 11 July, who they believed may be responsible for the crime.

== Reception ==
Bradley Ormesher of The Times described the mural as "impressive" and "a real tourist attraction".

== See also ==
- 2020 in art
