= F5WC =

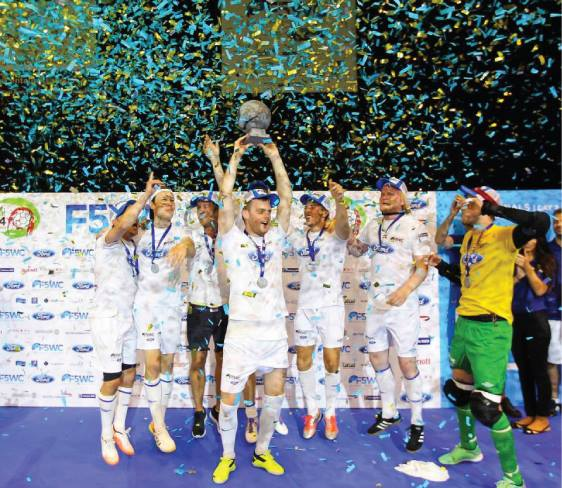
Denmark were the inaugural F5WC Champions in 2014

The F5WC is the world's largest amateur 5 a side football tournament. Established in 2014, the F5WC has had teams from over 60 countries participate since its inception. The inaugural tournament in 2014 was held in Dubai at the Dubai World Trade Centre which was contested between 32 nations, with Denmark winning the first edition.

In 2015, the World Finals of the F5WC were held once again at Skydive Dubai, with 48 nations competing. Morocco claimed the 2015 title with a win over Spain on penalties.

The 2016 World Finals were held in Bangkok. For third edition of the tournament, F5WC reverted back to the 32 country format.

The 2017 World Finals were held in Beijing. The United States won the title.

== Concept ==
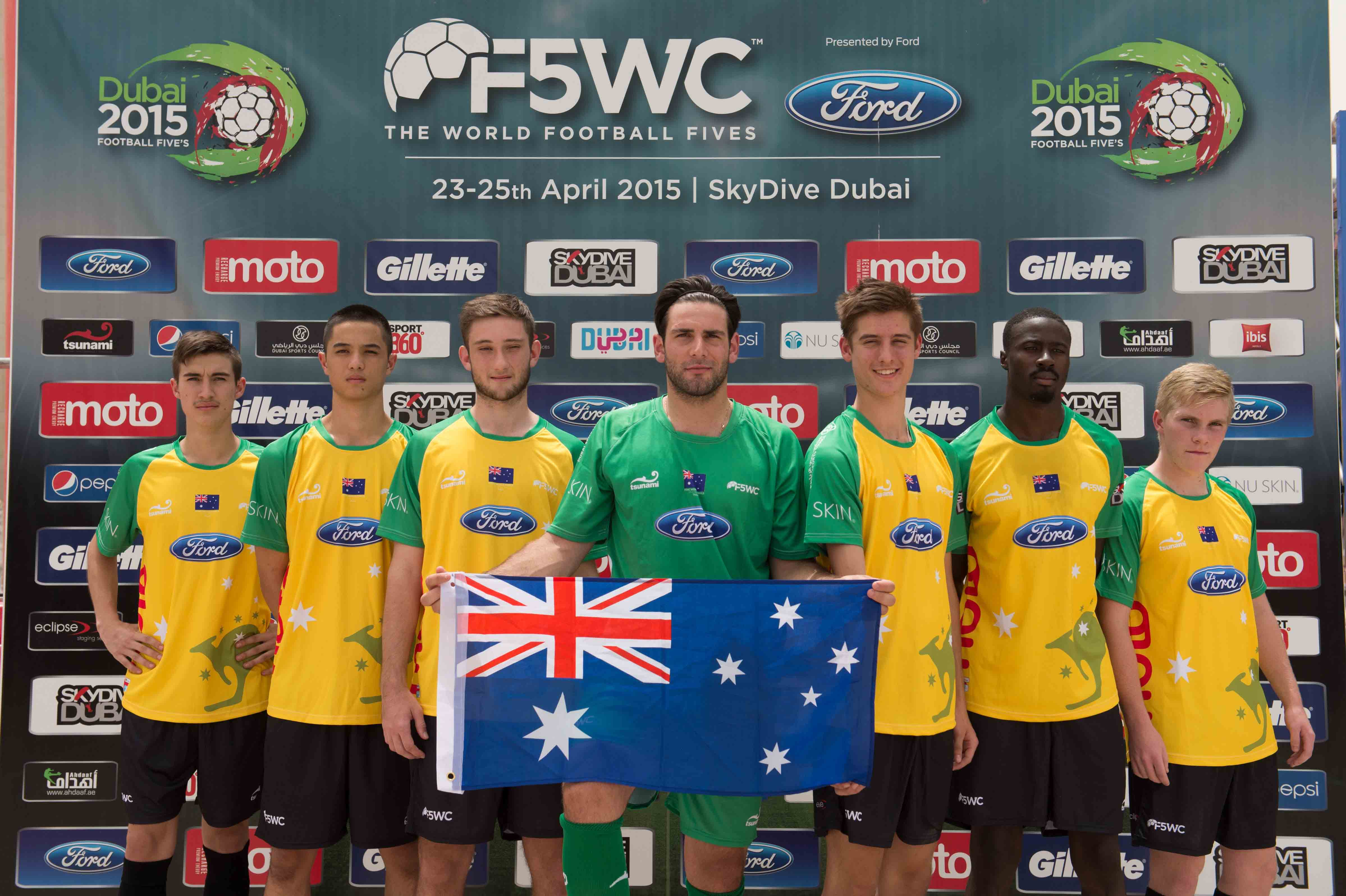
Australian team at the 2015 World Finals

The F5WC works with organisers around the world who host local qualifying tournaments in their country. Each Local Organising Committee (LOC) organises a tournament with a minimum of 64 teams participating. The winning team from each country win an all expenses paid trip to the World Finals destination which includes return airline tickets, the hotel stay, transportation for the duration of the stay, a full home & away playing kit, and exclusive F5WC welcome packages.

== Qualifiers ==
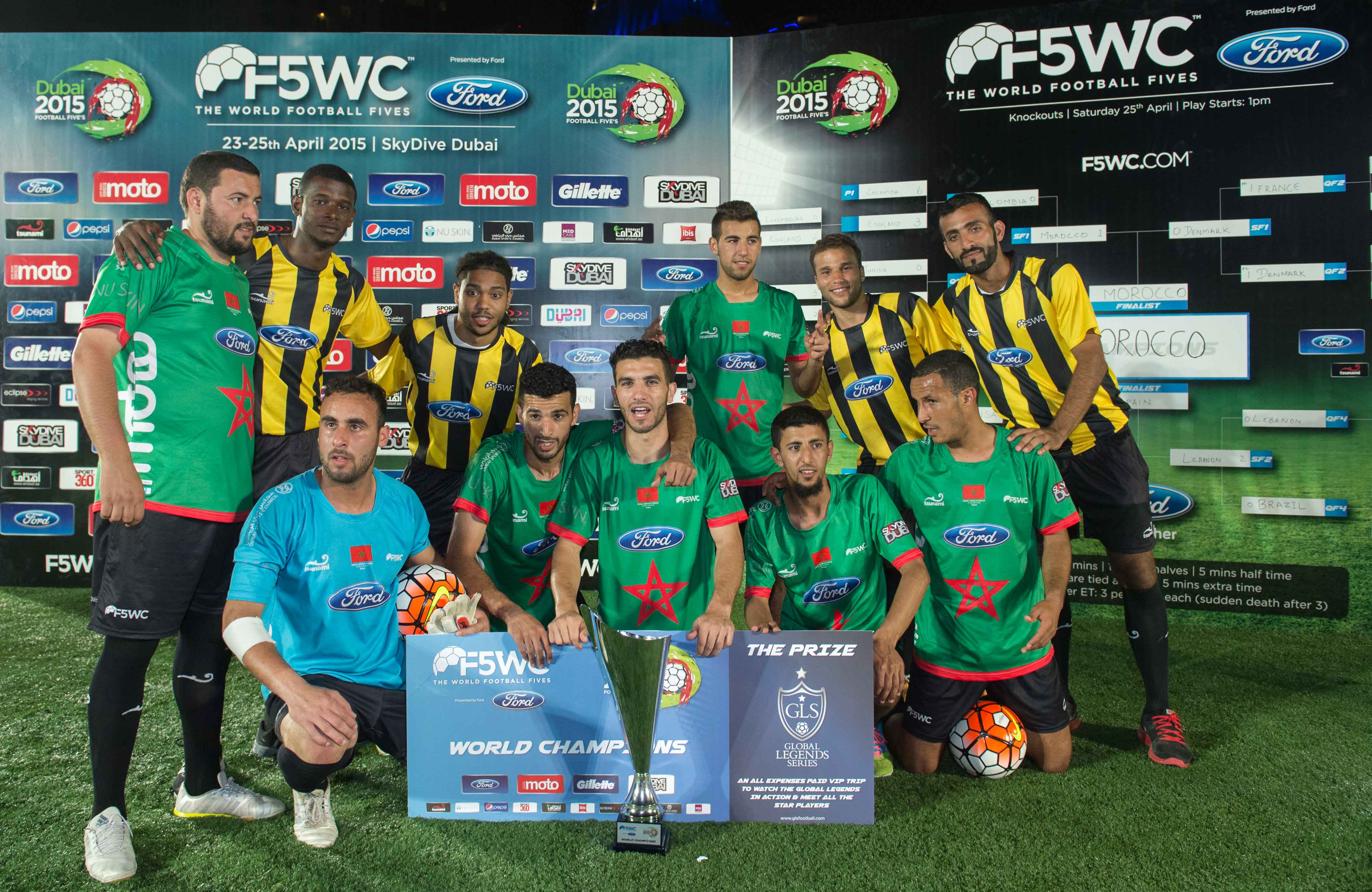
Morocco won the 2015 F5WC World Finals

Each local qualifier is independently organised by the "LOC" in accordance with the guidelines preset by the F5WC. These local qualifiers have a fixed period in which to be completed and winning team's data submitted to the F5WC.

The entry fees for qualifiers vary in all the countries taking into consideration various factors. Qualifiers usually run from 30 to 90 days depending on number of teams, participating cities & qualification period set forth by the F5WC.

== LOC Criteria ==
The F5WC has a set of predetermined criteria for choosing a LOC in any nation. An application must be submitted for evaluation by each LOC. Once the review is complete, the F5WC then selects the organiser. Since, the F5WC is independently organised, it receives multiple applications for each country, and the best application is awarded the exclusive rights to the F5WC in their respective country.

== Past winners ==
Year	Finals	Score	Winner
2014	Jordan vs Denmark	1-1(4-5p)	Denmark
2015	Morocco vs Spain	1-1(4-3p)	Morocco
2016	Colombia vs Japan	3-1	Colombia
2017	United States vs Panama	1-0	United States
2018	Argentina vs Bulgaria	2-1	Argentina

== See also ==
- Five-a-side football
- Association football
- Amateur football
