= Five-a-side football =

Variant of football

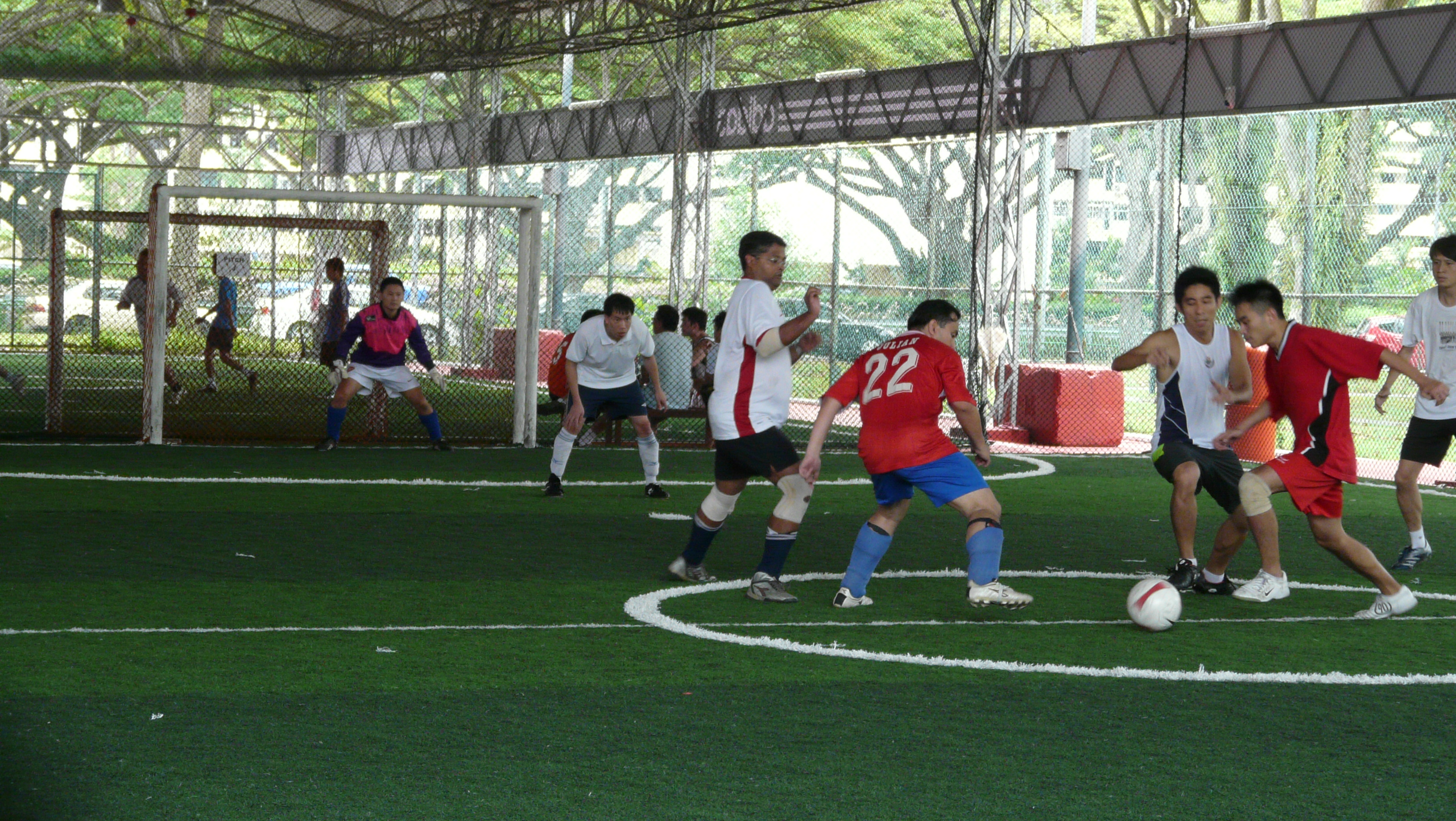
Five-a-side game on artificial turf pitch, Singapore

Five-a-side football is a version of minifootball in which each team fields five players (four outfield players and a goalkeeper). Other differences from association football include a smaller pitch, smaller goals, and a reduced game duration. Matches are played indoors or outdoors on artificial grass pitches that may be enclosed. Variations of five-a-side football include futsal, indoor soccer, jorkyball, beach soccer, cageball, six-a-side football and seven-a-side football, each with unique rules and pitch dimensions.

== History ==
While the non-recorded history of Five-a-side is largely unknown, it is speculated that during the early 20th century the sport would originate. It would be noted that during this time, mainly in South America, football players would not be paid around the clock, nor in the offseason, so many players would be stuck in other jobs. They would create unofficial leagues with less players, thus dubbing a five-a-side game-mode. The spread to the rest of the world would come halfway through the century, when many South American players would be brought to Europe to play professionally. The small-scale sport would gain popularity quickly among European players, so much so that in 1965 the first formal five-a-side tournament would be held.

== Rules ==
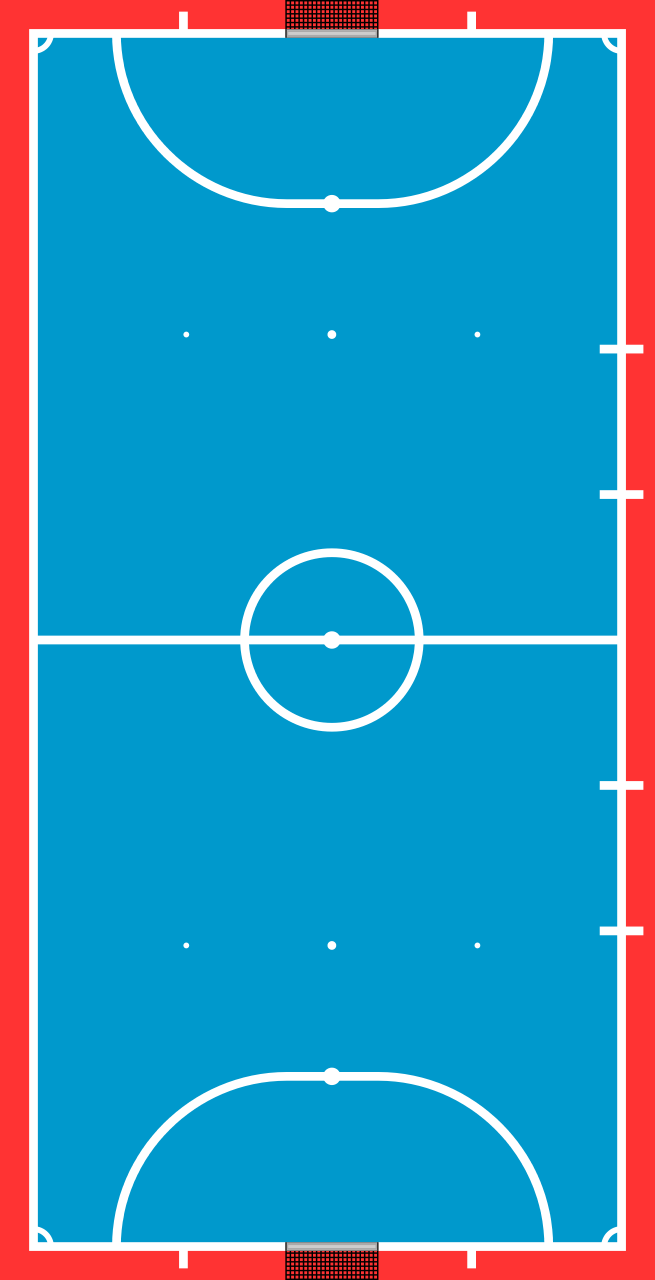
Traditional (Interchangeable) pitch between Futsal and Five-a-Side

The penalty area is significantly different from football: it is often semi-circular in shape, only the goalkeeper is allowed to touch the ball within it, and they may or may not be allowed out. Goalkeepers are only allowed to give the ball out to another player through hands. The goalkeeper may only kick the ball to effect a save, otherwise they are disallowed from using their feet to pass. There are no offside rules. Headers are allowed. There is no protocol of deliberate handball versus accidental handball – the referee needs to make a decision based on the distance from where the ball was hit. Yellow cards may result in the offending player being sent to the "sin bin" for a predetermined length of time. Red cards work in the same way as the 11-a-side game, the offending player being dismissed from the match. Charging/sliding tackles are awarded a yellow card.

Additionally, metal studded boots cannot be worn in an indoor arena, as this would damage the playing surface. Players are also required to wear shin guards, but enforcement of this is usually at the discretion of the referee.

Five-a-side is commonly played informally, and the rules are therefore flexible and are sometimes decided immediately before play begins; this is in contrast to futsal, for which official laws are published by FIFA. However, there have been many official and more formal Five-a-side matches in which the laws are often determined by the officiators and pre-existing rules.

The English FA have drawn up a full list of laws for the small-sided game which expands upon the rules outlined above and includes minimum/maximum pitch dimensions as well as technicalities on free-kicks and other parts of the game. Many of these laws follow upon that of traditional football, however there certainly exist some key differences. One of these being the disallowance for outfielders to enter either Penalty Area. If an attacking outfielder enters the opposing penalty area, whether with the intent to score or not, a referee will stop the game and restart play with the defending goalkeeper. Additionally if a defending outfielder enters their own penalty area, the defending team will be penalized by the opposing team being awarded a free kick. While headers are allowed in play, the Head Height rule prevents the ball from being passed or shot above the head. The height is typically determined by the height of the tallest person on the field, but is not set in stone and ultimately up to referee/officiator determination. If the referee determines the ball has been passed or kicked over head height, a free kick will be awarded against the offending player. An exception is to be made if the ball reaches this height after being hit off of a goalpost or being thrown from a goalkeeper.

== Fitness and conditioning ==
Five-a-side football commonly requires players to perform shorter sprints, rapid changes in directions and constant movement under minimal rest. Players usually focus on explosive speed drills, interval training, as well as dynamic warm-ups to prepare for the intensity. Training programs for five-a-side often emphasize quick reflexes, close ball control and tactical awareness.

== Variations ==
=== Futsal ===
Futsal is a version of indoor five-a-side football developed in South America. It currently has two governing bodies: the Asociación Mundial de Futsal (AMF) and the Fédération Internationale de Football Association (FIFA). Futsal often is referred to as a more official version of Five-a-side, with many of the rules being similar if not the same. Although, much of Five-a-side's fluidity in officiating and officiality allows for it to be played in a broader scope.

=== Indoor soccer ===
Indoor soccer is an indoor variant played primarily in North America, typically with six-a-side teams on an ice hockey-sized pitch.

=== Jorkyball ===
Jorkyball is a 2vs2 format of football played in a plexiglass cage of 10m x 5m. The players can use the walls to pass and to score. The governing body is the Jorkyball International Federation.

=== Beach soccer ===
Beach soccer is a variation of five-a-side football that it is played on a sandy surface. Rules do not greatly differ from those found in regular five-a-side football.

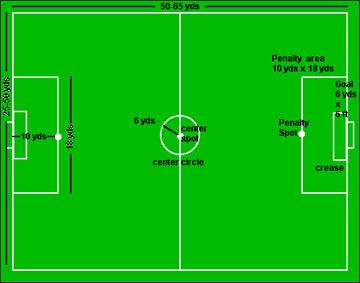
Seven-a-side pitch markings. Dimensions and shape of penalty area may differ for other variants.

=== OmegaBall ===
A variation with three five-a-side teams playing simultaneously on a circular pitch 60 yards (55 m) in diameter. A team scores a point by advancing the ball through either of their opponents' goals. The game was invented and is seen primarily in the United States.

=== Six-a-side football ===
On Whit Monday May 1880, Aston Villa Football Club arranged a six-a-side football competition at their Wellington Road ground. Other club entries included Blackburn Rovers, Darwen, Wednesbury Old Athletic, Walsall Swifts, Elwell's, and Notts Forest.

In this variation there are five outfield players and one goalkeeper on the pitch for each team at any time. Other rules do not differ from those found in five-a-side football, other than an increased pitch size.

=== Seven-a-side football ===
This is another variation with increased pitch and team size; in this case with six outfield players and a goalkeeper on each side. The rules differ from those from five-a-side.

==== SUB football ====
SUB football is a variation of seven-a-side football primarily played in Australia and New Zealand. The rules have been modified slightly to encourage new players to the game, with strict enforcement of non-contact and two ways to score points: by scoring a goal in the same manner as the other formats, or by scoring a board that is on either side of the goal. The boards are usually 2.5m long and one third of the height of the goal. A goal is 3 points and a board is 1 point. When the ball goes out of play, it may be kicked or thrown in. This applies to the sideline and corners.

=== Blind football ===
Played by athletes with visual impairment. It is a Paralympic event since 2004.

== Key differences ==
Five-a-side football is a fast-paced and less formal version of the game played on a smaller pitch with fewer players, emphasizing quick reactions, solo ball control and agility. In contrast, 11-a-side football is more structured, requiring more teamwork, long passes and strategic formations across a larger field. While five-a-side offers a more relaxed and social environment, 11-a-side provides a competitive setting for those who seek tactical depth and professional growth. Both formats offer various instances for skill-building opportunities and many players benefit from training exercises in both realms to enhance their overall performance.

== Different organisations ==
There are many operators of five-a-side football in Europe (Powerleague, Goals Soccer Center, UrbanSoccer), and most of all in the UK.

World Minifootball Federation (WMF) unites 71 national associations, grouped into federations by continent. European Minifootball Federation consists of 32 member associations. EMF organizes EMF miniEURO and EMF Champions League competitions.

International Socca Federation (ISF) is a six-a-side football organization, running yearly Socca World Cup events since 2018. 44 national teams participated in the 2023 Socca World Cup.

The F5WC is the world's largest amateur five-a-side football tournament in the world with over 48 participating nations. With notable tournaments happening during and after the following years of its establishment in 2014. In the 2014 games, Denmark were the winners, then in 2015, Morocco, and then Colombia in 2016, then the United States, and finally Argentina in 2018. No information exists beyond the group stage and qualified teams for the 2019 F5WC. It's unclear if the tournament was completed and if a winner was crowned. It seems that this last official tournament was held in 2019 in Cape Town, South Africa. There have been no confirmed tournaments under this organization following this event, and it appears there aren't any plans to re-instate it.

IFA7 is the international association that promotes seven-a-side football. IFA7 held the first known Seven-a-side Football World Cup in 2017 in Guatemala, with Russia winning the title.

Small-side football facilities are increasingly popular as a way for clubs to generate revenue through rentals, birthday parties and corporate events and to allow early scouting of young players.

== Youth organisations ==
The popularity of five-a-side youth football has grown tremendously within the US. The sport is used in educational environments to promote health and practice without needing full length fields. The American Youth Soccer Organization and the United States Youth Soccer Association are among the largest organisations bringing this format.

== See also ==
- F5WC
- Masters football
- Street football
- 3v3 Soccer
- Tennents' Sixes
- Paralympic association football
- Blind football
