= Paul McGuinness (footballer) =

English footballer

Personal information
- Full name: Paul McGuinness
- Date of birth: 2 March 1966 (age 60)
- Place of birth: Manchester, England
- Height: 5 ft 11 in (1.80 m)
- Position: Midfielder

Youth career
- 1982–1984: Manchester United

Senior career*
Years	Team	Apps	(Gls)
1984–1986	Manchester United	0	(0)
1986–1987	Crewe Alexandra	13	(0)
1989–1991	Manchester United	0	(0)
1991	Bury	0	(0)
1991–1992	Chester City	7	(0)

Managerial career
- 2005–2016: Manchester United F.C. Reserves and Academy (U-18)
- * Club domestic league appearances and goals

Paul McGuinness (born 2 March 1966) is an English former footballer who played as a midfielder in the Football League for Crewe Alexandra and Chester City. He is the current Head of Academy Player Development for Leicester City's under-18 team.

McGuinness is the son of former Manchester United player and manager Wilf McGuinness, and holds a degree in physical education from Loughborough University.

As a player, McGuinness was a midfielder who made 20 Football League appearances with Crewe Alexandra and Chester City. He also spent time with Manchester United (where he progressed through the youth ranks) and Bury without appearing in league games for them.
