= Cageball =

Variant of association football (invented 2002)

Cage Football (also known as Cageball) is a variant of association football invented in 2002 and played on an approximately 350sqm pitch enclosed by walls and netting, allowing continuous play without throw-ins or most out-of-bounds stoppages. The sport emphasizes technical skill, quick passing, creativity, and constant action due to the ball remaining in play for most of the match.

== History ==
Cage Football was invented by the football coach Jörg Berger in October 2002 as a way of playing football during unsuitable winter weather. The enclosed playing area allowed for uninterrupted play and created a faster-paced version of the sport.

The sport was developed in Gelsenkirchen, Germany, with the involvement of FC Schalke 04 and coach Jörg Berger. Berger drew inspiration from informal street football and sought to create a setting where players could continue playing without frequent interruptions caused by the ball leaving the field. The first Cageball games were played in October 2002, and the format used artificial-turf pitches enclosed by barriers and netting.

Since its introduction, various forms of Cage Football and Cageball have been played recreationally and competitively around the world.

== Playing field ==
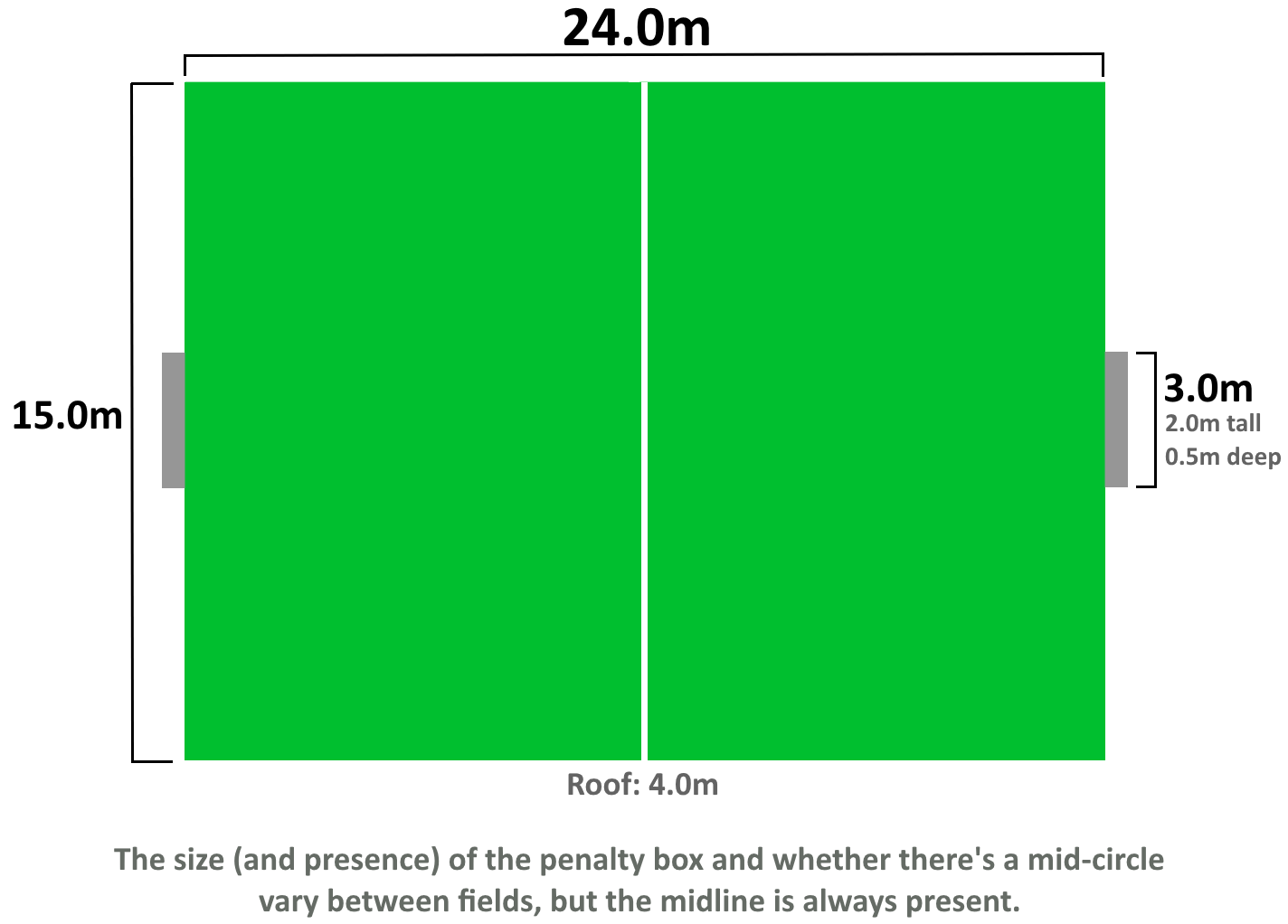
The base format of a cage football pitch.

Cage Football is played on artificial turf or other suitable surfaces. The playing area is rectangular and enclosed by walls or fencing, with overhead netting to keep the ball in play.

Common field dimensions are approximately 23 × 15 metres, although dimensions may vary depending on the venue or competition requirements.

The walls and netting surrounding the field eliminate most stoppages, as the ball remains in play after rebounding off the sides.

== Teams ==
Teams usually consist of:

- 3 outfield players
- 1 goalkeeper

Substitutions may be unlimited and can occur during stoppages or as specified by competition regulations.

Goalkeepers may also participate in open play as a "flying goalkeeper."

== Rules ==
Most rules of association football apply, including fouls and deliberate handball offences. However, Cage Football has several modifications:

- No offside rule.
- No throw-ins.
- No corner kicks.
- No goal kicks.
- The ball remains in play when rebounding off the walls or fencing.
- Free kicks are taken quickly to maintain the pace of play.
- Matches are played in short halves or periods depending on competition regulations.

Because the ball rarely leaves play, matches are generally fast-paced and high-scoring.

== See also ==
- Association football
- Indoor soccer
- Futsal
- Jorkyball
- Minifootball
