= 2023–24 Manchester United F.C. season =

English football club season

Manchester United F.C.
2023–24 season
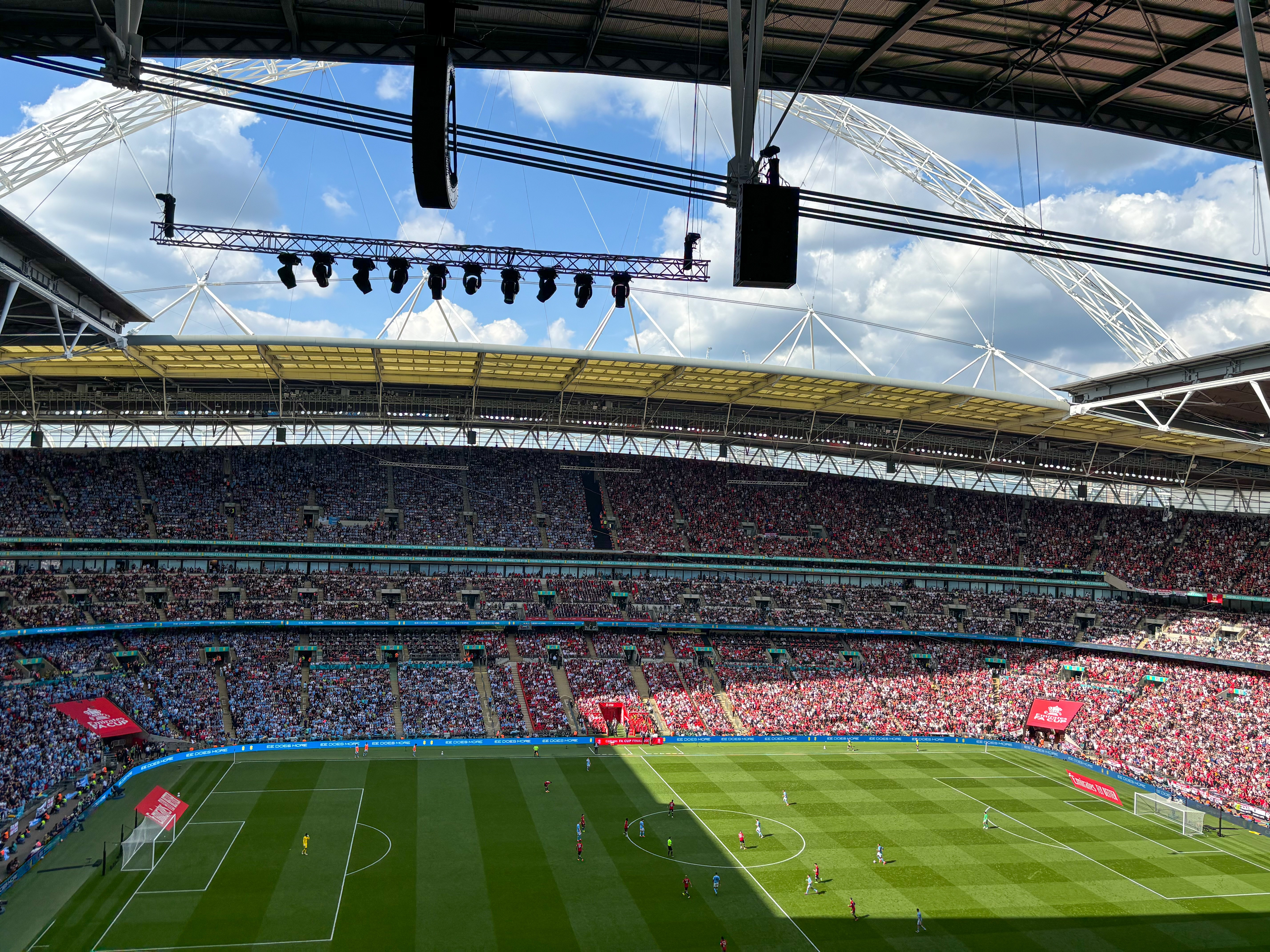
- Manchester United at Wembley against Manchester City in the 2024 FA Cup final
- Owner: Manchester United plc (72.3%); Ineos (27.7%; from 20 February)
- Co-chairmen: Joel and Avram Glazer
- Manager: Erik ten Hag
- Stadium: Old Trafford
- Premier League: 8th
- FA Cup: Winners
- EFL Cup: Fourth round
- UEFA Champions League: Group stage
- Top goalscorer: League: Bruno Fernandes; Rasmus Højlund (10 each); All: Rasmus Højlund (16)
- Highest home attendance: 73,612 (v. West Ham United, 4 February)
- Lowest home attendance: 72,291 (v. Liverpool, 17 March)
- Average home league attendance: 73,534
Home colours	Away colours	Third colours

The 2023–24 season was the 137th in the history of Manchester United, their 32nd season in the Premier League and their 49th consecutive season in the top flight of English football. It was the club's second season under the management of Erik ten Hag.

A campaign marred by injuries saw the club finish eighth in the Premier League, their worst position since 1989–90, with a negative goal difference. United were knocked out of the EFL Cup in the fourth round by the previous season's final opponents, Newcastle United, and recorded their worst-ever Champions League group stage performance, finishing bottom of their group with just four points. In the FA Cup they almost suffered a humiliating exit at the hands of second tier Coventry City in the semi final, throwing away a 3–0 lead before winning on penalties. This meant they reached the final for the second consecutive season where they faced cross-city rivals Manchester City in a repeat of the previous year's showpiece. In a match they were widely considered underdogs, United won 2–1, marking the first time since 2017 that they won a trophy in consecutive seasons.

This was the first season since 2010–11 without goalkeeper David de Gea and defender Phil Jones, both of whom left the club upon the expiry of their contracts. With their departures, United were initially without a Premier League winner in their squad for the first time since the competition's inaugural season in 1992–93, and without a player who had played under Alex Ferguson for the first time since 1974. However, the re-signing of Jonny Evans, who won three Premier League titles with the club between 2006 and 2015, meant that was no longer the case.

On 24 December, Manchester United announced that the club had agreed a deal with Jim Ratcliffe to purchase a 25% stake in the club. On 20 February, the investment was confirmed as complete, with Trawlers Ltd acquiring a 27.7% share in the club.

== Pre-season and friendlies ==
On 27 March 2023, United announced a tour of the United States, with friendly matches against Wrexham – who are co-owned by actors Ryan Reynolds and Rob McElhenney and who also had former United goalkeeper Ben Foster in their squad – in San Diego, and Borussia Dortmund in Las Vegas. On 12 May, the club announced their third and fourth pre-season friendlies in the US against fierce rivals Arsenal in New York City, and in Houston against Real Madrid, which will be played one day after Wrexham game. A fifth friendly, the first based in the UK, against Lyon in Edinburgh was also added to the pre-season calendar. On 25 May, the club announced a friendly against Roses rivals and EFL Championship club Leeds United in Oslo. A seventh match, against Athletic Bilbao in Dublin, was announced on 13 June. On 29 June, the club announced a home friendly against French club Lens, to be played the day before the match against Athletic Bilbao.

United won their first match of pre-season against Leeds 2–0, thanks to second-half goals from substitutes Noam Emeran and Joe Hugill, while Donny van de Beek's goal against Lyon gave them their second win in Edinburgh. In the first game of the United States tour, first-half goals from newly appointed captain Bruno Fernandes and Jadon Sancho gave United a 2–0 win over Arsenal; they also won the post-match exhibition penalty shoot-out 5–3. With their match against Real Madrid scheduled for Houston the next day, United fielded a team made up largely of under-21 players against Wrexham on 25 July. They went 2–0 down in the first half, though Marc Jurado pulled a goal back on the stroke of half-time; however, Dan Gore was sent off early in the second half and a third Wrexham goal completed a 3–1 defeat for United. They then suffered a second loss in as many days when goals from Jude Bellingham and Joselu gave Real Madrid a 2–0 win in Houston; newly signed goalkeeper André Onana made his debut in the game, playing the full 90 minutes. Manchester United's tour of the United States ended with a 3–2 defeat against Borussia Dortmund at the Allegiant Stadium in Las Vegas on 31 July. Diogo Dalot put United ahead in the 24th minute, but Donyell Malen scored twice in two minutes just before half-time to give Dortmund the lead. Antony levelled the scores before Youssoufa Moukoko secured the win for the Germans.

The Reds returned to winning ways with a 3–1 comeback win over Lens at Old Trafford. Florian Sotoca put the visitors ahead after chipping Onana from the edge of the centre circle in the first half, before Marcus Rashford, Antony and Casemiro scored in the second period to turn the game around for United. The following day, a second string United side drew 1–1 with Athletic Bilbao in Dublin. The La Liga team scored first through Nico Williams, but an added time equaliser from Facundo Pellistri meant that United ended their pre-season campaign with a draw.

Date	Opponents	H / A	Result F–A	Scorers	Attendance
12 July 2023	Leeds United	N	2–0	Emeran 67', Hugill 81'	21,021
19 July 2023	Lyon	N	1–0	Van de Beek 49'	48,484
22 July 2023	Arsenal	N	2–0	Fernandes 30', Sancho 37'	82,262
25 July 2023	Wrexham	N	1–3	Jurado 45+6'	34,248
26 July 2023	Real Madrid	N	0–2		67,801
30 July 2023	Borussia Dortmund	N	2–3	Dalot 24', Antony 52'	50,857
5 August 2023	Lens	H	3–1	Rashford 49', Antony 53', Casemiro 59'	70,000
6 August 2023	Athletic Bilbao	N	1–1	Pellistri 90+3'	50,238

== Premier League ==
The 2023–24 Premier League fixtures were released on 15 June 2023.

The league season began with a home win against Wolverhampton Wanderers on 14 August. After a scoreless first half, Raphaël Varane scored the game's only goal with a 76th-minute header. Named in the starting line-up, Mason Mount and André Onana made their debuts for United. Five days later, United suffered an away defeat to Tottenham Hotspur. Pape Matar Sarr opened the scoring for the home side in the 49th minute, and an own goal from Lisandro Martínez doubled their lead seven minutes from the end. United then hosted Nottingham Forest the following weekend, coming into the match on a 30-game unbeaten run at home; however, that streak was put in jeopardy as United conceded two goals in the opening five minutes. Christian Eriksen pulled one back in the first half, before Casemiro and Bruno Fernandes secured the comeback win with a goal each either side of a second-half red card for Forest's Joe Worrall.

The month of September started with a loss away to Arsenal. Marcus Rashford struck first, but Martin Ødegaard levelled the score 35 seconds after restart of the game. In the second half, a VAR check saw an Arsenal penalty claim overturned and another check led to an effort by Alejandro Garnacho being ruled out as offside. The Gunners then struck twice in injury time to win the match. Following an international break, United hosted Brighton & Hove Albion; their 31-game unbeaten run at home ended with former United player Danny Welbeck scoring the opening goal. In the second half, Brighton scored two more goals, though substitute Hannibal Mejbri scored a consolation goal in the 73rd-minute from outside the box, marking his first goal of the season. The Red Devils would then win against Burnley away the following weekend, Bruno Fernandes scoring the only goal with a 45th-minute volley that would later win Premier League Goal of the Month. The month of September closed with a 1–0 defeat to Crystal Palace at home, marking back-to-back defeats at home for the Reds.

Manchester United would host Brentford at home to kick off October, where Mathias Jensen's first-half effort for the Bees saw them lead 1–0, threatening to make it United's third consecutive loss at home for the first time since the 1978-79 season. However, with three minutes of stoppage-time left, Scott McTominay was brought on and scored two goals within three minutes, salvaging a win for the Reds. Two weeks later United travelled to Sheffield United, wearing black armbands in remembrance of Bobby Charlton, following the earlier news of his passing. Scott McTominay opened the scoring in the first half, but the home-team quickly responded via a penalty from Oli McBurnie. With the scoreline level until the 77th-minute, Diogo Dalot fired home his first goal of the season beyond the penalty area to win the match. The month closed with United hosting rivals Manchester City; Erling Haaland put City ahead with a penalty in the first half after Rasmus Højlund was penalised for dragging down Rodri inside the box. After Onana saved a far-post header from Haaland, a near-identical play saw Haaland double City's lead before half-time courtesy of a cross from Bernardo Silva. In the 86th minute, Phil Foden scored the third goal, cementing a 3–0 defeat for United.

=== Matches ===
Date	Opponents	H / A	Result F–A	Scorers	Attendance	League position
14 August 2023	Wolverhampton Wanderers	H	1–0	Varane 76'	73,358	7th
19 August 2023	Tottenham Hotspur	A	0–2		61,910	12th
26 August 2023	Nottingham Forest	H	3–2	Eriksen 17', Casemiro 52', Fernandes 76' (pen.)	73,595	8th
3 September 2023	Arsenal	A	1–3	Rashford 27'	60,192	11th
16 September 2023	Brighton & Hove Albion	H	1–3	Mejbri 73'	73,592	13th
23 September 2023	Burnley	A	1–0	Fernandes 45'	21,593	9th
30 September 2023	Crystal Palace	H	0–1		73,428	10th
7 October 2023	Brentford	H	2–1	McTominay (2) 90+3', 90+7'	73,453	10th
21 October 2023	Sheffield United	A	2–1	McTominay 28', Dalot 77'	31,543	8th
29 October 2023	Manchester City	H	0–3		73,502	8th
4 November 2023	Fulham	A	1–0	Fernandes 90+1'	24,415	8th
11 November 2023	Luton Town	H	1–0	Lindelöf 59'	73,599	6th
26 November 2023	Everton	A	3–0	Garnacho 3', Rashford 56' (pen.), Martial 75'	39,257	6th
2 December 2023	Newcastle United	A	0–1		52,214	7th
6 December 2023	Chelsea	H	2–1	McTominay (2) 19', 69'	73,607	6th
9 December 2023	Bournemouth	H	0–3		73,427	6th
17 December 2023	Liverpool	A	0–0		57,158	7th
23 December 2023	West Ham United	A	0–2		64,472	8th
26 December 2023	Aston Villa	H	3–2	Garnacho (2) 59', 71', Højlund 82'	73,574	7th
30 December 2023	Nottingham Forest	A	1–2	Rashford 78'	29,529	8th
14 January 2024	Tottenham Hotspur	H	2–2	Højlund 3', Rashford 40'	73,489	7th
1 February 2024	Wolverhampton Wanderers	A	4–3	Rashford 5', Højlund 22', McTominay 75', Mainoo 90+7'	31,641	7th
4 February 2024	West Ham United	H	3–0	Højlund 23', Garnacho (2) 49', 84'	73,612	6th
11 February 2024	Aston Villa	A	2–1	Højlund 17', McTominay 86'	42,185	6th
18 February 2024	Luton Town	A	2–1	Højlund (2) 1', 7'	11,483	6th
24 February 2024	Fulham	H	1–2	Maguire 89'	73,487	6th
3 March 2024	Manchester City	A	1–3	Rashford 8'	55,097	6th
9 March 2024	Everton	H	2–0	Fernandes 12' (pen.), Rashford 36' (pen.)	73,601	6th
30 March 2024	Brentford	A	1–1	Mount 90+6'	17,138	6th
4 April 2024	Chelsea	A	3–4	Garnacho (2) 34', 67', Fernandes 39'	39,694	6th
7 April 2024	Liverpool	H	2–2	Fernandes 50, Mainoo 67'	73,522	6th
13 April 2024	Bournemouth	A	2–2	Fernandes (2) 31', 65' (pen.)	11,229	7th
24 April 2024 (Note: This match, originally scheduled for 16 March 2024, was rescheduled due to United's involvement in the FA Cup quarter-finals.)	Sheffield United	H	4–2	Maguire 42', Fernandes (2) 61' (pen.), 81', Højlund 85'	73,549	6th
27 April 2024	Burnley	H	1–1	Antony 79'	73,571	6th
6 May 2024	Crystal Palace	A	0–4		25,190	8th
12 May 2024	Arsenal	H	0–1		73,600	8th
15 May 2024 (Note: This match, originally scheduled for 20 April 2024, was rescheduled due to United's involvement in the FA Cup semi-finals.)	Newcastle United	H	3–2	Mainoo 31', Diallo 57', Højlund 84'	73,582	8th
19 May 2024	Brighton & Hove Albion	A	2–0	Dalot 73', Højlund 88'	31,662	8th

=== League table ===
Pos	Team	Pld	W	D	L	GF	GA	GD	Pts	Qualification or relegation
6	Chelsea	38	18	9	11	77	63	+14	63	Qualification for the Conference League play-off round (Note: Since the winners of the 2023–24 EFL Cup, Liverpool, qualified for the Champions League, the spot given to the League Cup winners (Conference League play-off round) was passed to the sixth-placed team.)
7	Newcastle United	38	18	6	14	85	62	+23	60	
8	Manchester United	38	18	6	14	57	58	−1	60	Qualification for the Europa League league phase (Note: Manchester United qualified for the Europa League league phase as the 2023–24 FA Cup winners.)
9	West Ham United	38	14	10	14	60	74	−14	52	
10	Crystal Palace	38	13	10	15	57	58	−1	49	

Source: Premier League
Rules for classification: 1) Points; 2) Goal difference; 3) Goals scored; 4) If the champions, relegated teams or qualified teams for UEFA competitions cannot be determined by rules 1 to 3, rules 4.1 to 4.3 are applied – 4.1) Points gained in head-to-head record between such teams; 4.2) Away goals scored in head-to-head record between such teams; 4.3) Play-offs

== FA Cup ==
As a Premier League side, United entered the 2023–24 FA Cup in the third round and were drawn away to Wigan Athletic, with the match to be played on 8 January 2024. United won 2–0 thanks to a long-range strike from Diogo Dalot in the first half, followed by a Bruno Fernandes penalty. They were then drawn against either Newport County or Eastleigh in the fourth round. Newport were confirmed as their opponents when they beat Eastleigh 3–1 in a replay on 16 January 2024. On 28 January, United won at Rodney Parade 4–2 courtesy of goals from Fernandes, Kobbie Mainoo, Antony and Rasmus Højlund. On the same day, Bristol City or Nottingham Forest were drawn as their next opponents, with the match taking place on 28 February. On 7 February, Nottingham Forest were confirmed as United's next opponents thanks to their 5–3 win on penalties. United won at City Ground 1–0 thanks to a late effort from Casemiro.

With Liverpool's 3–0 win over Southampton in the fifth round, United were drawn against their rivals in the quarter-finals. The tie was played on 17 March. United took an early lead thanks to Scott McTominay, but going into half time, goals from Alexis Mac Allister and Mohamed Salah saw Liverpool take a 2–1 lead. Antony scored a late equaliser to take the match into extra time, although Rashford missed the chance to score an injury-time winner. Near the end of the first half of extra time, Harvey Elliott gave Liverpool the lead, but in the second half, Rashford equalised to make the score 3–3. In injury time, Amad Diallo scored the winning goal, and was sent off for taking his shirt off in the celebrations as he was given a yellow card prior to scoring.

United were drawn against Coventry City in the semi-finals. They faced each other at Wembley Stadium on 21 April, with United winning 4–2 on penalties after giving up a 3–0 lead in the second thanks to Coventry striker Haji Wright's equalizer in stoppage time of the second half.

United faced Manchester City for a second consecutive Manchester Derby FA Cup Final. Alejandro Garnacho opened the scoring following a miscommunication between Joško Gvardiol and Stefan Ortega. Following a disallowed Marcus Rashford goal, Kobbie Mainoo quickly scored United's second. Jerémy Doku got one back for City late on but it wasn't enough as United picked up their 13th FA Cup trophy.

Date	Round	Opponents	H / A	Result F–A	Scorers	Attendance
8 January 2024	Third round	Wigan Athletic	A	2–0	Dalot 22', Fernandes 74' (pen.)	22,870
28 January 2024	Fourth round	Newport County	A	4–2	Fernandes 7', Mainoo 13', Antony 68', Højlund 90+4'	9,086
28 February 2024	Fifth round	Nottingham Forest	A	1–0	Casemiro 89'	28,665
17 March 2024	Quarter-finals	Liverpool	H	4–3 (a.e.t.)	McTominay 10', Antony 87', Rashford 112', Diallo 120+1'	72,291
21 April 2024	Semi-finals	Coventry City	N	3–3 (a.e.t.) (4–2p)	McTominay 23', Maguire 45+1', Fernandes 58'	83,672
25 May 2024	Final	Manchester City	N	2–1	Garnacho 30', Mainoo 39'	84,814

== EFL Cup ==
As United were competing in UEFA competition in 2023–24 as the reigning champions of the competition, they entered the 2023–24 EFL Cup in the third round in September. They were drawn at home to Crystal Palace. They beat Palace 3–0 thanks to goals from Alejandro Garnacho, Casemiro and Anthony Martial. In the fourth round, they were given another home draw against Newcastle United, in a repeat of the 2023 EFL Cup final. This time they lost 3–0, with goals from Miguel Almirón and Lewis Hall in the first half and a third from Joe Willock in the second.

Date	Round	Opponents	H / A	Result F–A	Scorers	Attendance
26 September 2023	Third round	Crystal Palace	H	3–0	Garnacho 21', Casemiro 27', Martial 55'	72,842
1 November 2023	Fourth round	Newcastle United	H	0–3		72,484

== UEFA Champions League ==
=== Group stage ===
Having finished third in the 2022–23 Premier League, United qualified for the 2023–24 UEFA Champions League. They entered the competition in the group stage, which was drawn on 31 August 2023, with United in pot 2 along with Real Madrid, Inter Milan, Borussia Dortmund, Atlético Madrid, RB Leipzig, Porto and Arsenal. After losing their first two matches in Group A to Bayern Munich and Galatasaray, United responded with a 1-0 win over FC Copenhagen, Harry Maguire scoring the winning goal and Andre Onana saving a last minute penalty kick. However United gave away two-goal leads against Copenhagen and Galatasaray, causing eventual elimination from the competition after a 1–0 defeat to Bayern.

Date	Opponents	H / A	Result F–A	Scorers	Attendance	Group position
20 September 2023	Bayern Munich	A	3–4	Højlund 49', Casemiro (2) 88', 90+5'	75,000	4th
3 October 2023	Galatasaray	H	2–3	Højlund (2) 17', 67'	73,204	4th
24 October 2023	Copenhagen	H	1–0	Maguire 72'	73,249	3rd
8 November 2023	Copenhagen	A	3–4	Højlund (2) 3', 28', Fernandes 69' (pen.)	36,099	4th
29 November 2023	Galatasaray	A	3–3	Garnacho 11', Fernandes 18', McTominay 55'	51,733	4th
12 December 2023	Bayern Munich	H	0–1		73,073	4th

Pos	Team	Pld	W	D	L	GF	GA	GD	Pts	Qualification
1	(Germany) Bayern Munich	6	5	1	0	12	6	+6	16	Advance to knockout phase
2	(Denmark) Copenhagen	6	2	2	2	8	8	0	8	Advance to knockout phase
3	(Turkey) Galatasaray	6	1	2	3	10	13	−3	5	Transfer to Europa League
4	(England) Manchester United	6	1	1	4	12	15	−3	4	

Source: UEFA
Rules for classification: Group stage tiebreakers

== Squad statistics ==
No.	Pos.	Name	League		FA Cup		EFL Cup		Europe		Total		Discipline	
No.	Pos.	Name	Apps	Goals	Apps	Goals	Apps	Goals	Apps	Goals	Apps	Goals	Yellow card	Red card
1	GK	(Turkey) Altay Bayındır	0	0	1	0	0	0	0	0	1	0	0	0
2	DF	(Sweden) Victor Lindelöf	14(5)	1	2(1)	0	1(1)	0	3(1)	0	20(8)	1	3	0
3	DF	(Ivory Coast) Eric Bailly	0	0	0	0	0	0	0	0	0	0	0	0
4	MF	(Morocco) Sofyan Amrabat	10(11)	0	2	0	1(1)	0	4(1)	0	17(13)	0	9	0
5	DF	(England) Harry Maguire	18(4)	2	1(2)	1	2	0	4	1	25(6)	4	4	0
6	DF	(Argentina) Lisandro Martínez	8(3)	0	2	0	0	0	1	0	11(3)	0	4	0
7	MF	(England) Mason Mount	5(9)	1	0(2)	0	2	0	1(1)	0	8(12)	1	2	0
8	MF	(Portugal) Bruno Fernandes (c)	35	10	6	3	0(1)	0	6	2	47(1)	15	12	0
9	FW	(France) Anthony Martial	5(8)	1	0	0	2	1	0(4)	0	7(12)	2	0	0
10	FW	(England) Marcus Rashford	26(7)	7	5	1	0(1)	0	4	0	35(8)	8	2	1
11	FW	(Denmark) Rasmus Højlund	25(5)	10	4(1)	1	0(2)	0	6	5	35(8)	16	2	0
12	DF	(Netherlands) Tyrell Malacia	0	0	0	0	0	0	0	0	0	0	0	0
14	MF	(Denmark) Christian Eriksen	12(10)	1	0(2)	0	0	0	2(2)	0	14(14)	1	1	0
15	DF	(Spain) Sergio Reguilón	4(5)	0	0	0	1	0	2	0	7(5)	0	4	0
16	FW	(Ivory Coast) Amad Diallo	3(6)	1	0(3)	1	0	0	0	0	3(9)	2	1	1
17 (Note: Garnacho played with shirt number 49 in August 2023 matches.)	FW	(Argentina) Alejandro Garnacho	30(6)	7	6	1	2	1	3(3)	1	41(9)	10	4	0
18	MF	(Brazil) Casemiro	24(1)	1	3	1	2	1	2	2	31(1)	5	9	1
19	DF	(France) Raphaël Varane	16(6)	1	5	0	1	0	3(1)	0	25(7)	1	2	0
20	DF	(Portugal) Diogo Dalot	35(1)	2	6	1	2	0	5(1)	0	48(2)	3	6	1
21	FW	(Brazil) Antony	15(14)	1	2(2)	2	1	0	3(1)	0	21(17)	3	6	0
22	GK	(England) Tom Heaton	0	0	0	0	0	0	0	0	0	0	0	0
23	DF	(England) Luke Shaw	12	0	1	0	0	0	2	0	15	0	7	0
24	GK	(Cameroon) André Onana	38	0	5	0	2	0	6	0	51	0	7	0
25	FW	(England) Jadon Sancho	0(3)	0	0	0	0	0	0	0	0(3)	0	0	0
26	GK	(England) Dean Henderson	0	0	0	0	0	0	0	0	0	0	0	0
28	MF	(Uruguay) Facundo Pellistri	1(8)	0	0(1)	0	1	0	1(2)	0	3(11)	0	0	0
29	DF	(England) Aaron Wan-Bissaka	20(2)	0	4	0	0(1)	0	2(1)	0	26(4)	0	5	0
33	DF	(England) Brandon Williams	0	0	0	0	0	0	0	0	0	0	0	0
34	MF	(Netherlands) Donny van de Beek	0(1)	0	0	0	0(1)	0	0	0	0(2)	0	0	0
35	DF	(Northern Ireland) Jonny Evans	15(8)	0	1(3)	0	0(1)	0	1(1)	0	17(13)	0	2	0
37	MF	(England) Kobbie Mainoo	24	3	5(1)	2	0	0	0(2)	0	29(3)	5	4	0
39	MF	(Scotland) Scott McTominay	18(14)	7	5(1)	2	0	0	4(1)	1	27(16)	10	4	0
40	GK	(Czech Republic) Radek Vítek	0	0	0	0	0	0	0	0	0	0	0	0
42	DF	(Spain) Álvaro Carreras	0	0	0	0	0	0	0	0	0	0	0	0
43	DF	(England) Teden Mengi	0	0	0	0	0	0	0	0	0	0	0	0
44	MF	(England) Dan Gore	0(1)	0	0	0	0(1)	0	0	0	0(2)	0	0	0
46	MF	(Tunisia) Hannibal Mejbri	1(4)	1	0(1)	0	2	0	1(1)	0	4(6)	1	3	0
47	FW	(England) Shola Shoretire	0	0	0	0	0	0	0	0	0	0	0	0
53	DF	(Democratic Republic of the Congo) Willy Kambwala	3(5)	0	0(2)	0	0	0	0	0	3(7)	0	1	0
62	MF	(England) Omari Forson	1(3)	0	0(3)	0	0	0	0	0	1(6)	0	0	0
84	FW	(England) Ethan Wheatley	0(3)	0	0	0	0	0	0	0	0(3)	0	0	0
Own goals			—	0	—	0	—	0	—	0	—	0	N/A	

== Transfers ==
=== In ===
Date	Pos.	Name	From	Fee	Ref.
5 July 2023	MF	(England) Mason Mount	(England) Chelsea	Undisclosed (Note: Reported as £55 million, plus £5 million in add-ons)	
18 July 2023 (Note: Evans signed for Manchester United on a short-term contract of unspecified length on 18 July. On 1 September, he signed a one-year contract with the club.)	DF	(Northern Ireland) Jonny Evans	Unattached (Note: Most recently played for Leicester City)	Free	
20 July 2023	GK	(Cameroon) André Onana	(Italy) Inter Milan	Undisclosed (Note: Reported as £43.8 million, plus £3.4 million in add-ons)	
4 August 2023	DF	(England) Harry Amass	(England) Watford	Undisclosed	
5 August 2023	FW	(Denmark) Rasmus Højlund	(Italy) Atalanta	Undisclosed (Note: Reported as £64 million, plus £8 million in add-ons)	
15 August 2023	MF	(England) Jack Fletcher	(England) Manchester City	Undisclosed	
15 August 2023	MF	(Scotland) Tyler Fletcher	(England) Manchester City	Undisclosed	
1 September 2023	GK	(Turkey) Altay Bayındır	(Turkey) Fenerbahçe	Undisclosed (Note: Reported as £4.3 million)	
13 September 2023	GK	(England) Kie Plumley	Unattached (Note: Most recently played for Oxford United)	Free	

=== Out ===
Date	Pos.	Name	To	Fee	Ref.
26 June 2023	MF	(Iraq) Zidane Iqbal	(Netherlands) Utrecht	Undisclosed	
30 June 2023	MF	(Northern Ireland) Ethan Galbraith	(England) Leyton Orient	Free	
30 June 2023	DF	(England) Phil Jones	Unattached	Released	
30 June 2023	DF	(Jamaica) Di'Shon Bernard	Unattached (Note: Joined Sheffield Wednesday after release)	Released	
30 June 2023	DF	(England) Axel Tuanzebe	Unattached (Note: Joined Ipswich Town after release)	Released	
30 June 2023	GK	(Netherlands) Eric Hanbury	Unattached	Released	
30 June 2023	MF	(England) Charlie Wellens	Unattached (Note: Joined Reading after release)	Released	
30 June 2023	FW	(England) Manni Norkett	(England) Nottingham Forest	Free	
30 June 2023	DF	(England) Ethan Laird	(England) Birmingham City	Undisclosed	
30 June 2023	GK	(Spain) David de Gea	Unattached	Released	
1 July 2023	MF	(Wales) Aidan Higgins	(Wales) Swansea City	Free	
12 July 2023	FW	(England) Adam Abbas	(England) Burnley	Free	
12 July 2023	GK	(England) Felix Chester	(England) Burnley	Free	
20 July 2023	DF	(Netherlands) Björn Hardley	(Netherlands) Utrecht	Undisclosed	
22 July 2023	MF	(Wales) Charlie Savage	(England) Reading	Undisclosed	
23 July 2023	DF	(Brazil) Alex Telles	(Saudi Arabia) Al Nassr	Undisclosed (Note: Reported as £6 million)	
25 July 2023	FW	(Sweden) Anthony Elanga	(England) Nottingham Forest	Undisclosed (Note: Reported as £15 million)	
2 August 2023	GK	(England) Nathan Bishop	(England) Sunderland	Undisclosed	
13 August 2023	MF	(Brazil) Fred	(Turkey) Fenerbahçe	Undisclosed (Note: Reported as £8.62 million, plus £4.31 million in add-ons)	
15 August 2023	GK	(Czech Republic) Matěj Kovář	(Germany) Bayer Leverkusen	Undisclosed (Note: Reported as £7.78 million)	
15 August 2023	GK	(Czech Republic) Ondřej Mastný	(Czech Republic) Vysočina Jihlava	Undisclosed	
24 August 2023	FW	(France) Noam Emeran	(Netherlands) Groningen	Undisclosed	
31 August 2023	GK	(England) Dean Henderson	(England) Crystal Palace	Undisclosed (Note: Reported as £15 million, plus £5 million in add-ons)	
31 August 2023	DF	(England) Teden Mengi	(England) Luton Town	Undisclosed	
1 September 2023	DF	(Spain) Marc Jurado	(Spain) Espanyol	Undisclosed	
1 September 2023	FW	(England) Nehemiah Oriola	(England) Brighton & Hove Albion	Free	
1 September 2023	DF	(England) Logan Pye	(England) Burnley	Undisclosed	
5 September 2023	DF	(Ivory Coast) Eric Bailly	(Turkey) Beşiktaş	Undisclosed (Note: Reported as free transfer.)	
3 October 2023	DF	(England) Harrison Parker	(England) Manchester City	Undisclosed	
18 January 2024	FW	(Colombia) Mateo Mejía	(Spain) Sevilla	Undisclosed	
1 February 2024	MF	(England) Adam Berry	Unattached (Note: Joined Nottingham Forest after release)	Released	
1 February 2024	MF	(Norway) Isak Hansen-Aarøen	(Germany) Werder Bremen	Undisclosed	

=== Loan in ===
Date from	Date to	Pos.	Name	From	Ref.
1 September 2023	4 January 2024 (Note: Manchester United triggered a break clause to end Reguilón's loan on 4 January 2024.)	DF	(Spain) Sergio Reguilón	(England) Tottenham Hotspur	
1 September 2023	End of season	MF	(Morocco) Sofyan Amrabat	(Italy) Fiorentina	

=== Loan out ===
Date from	Date to	Pos.	Name	To	Ref.
27 July 2023	30 June 2024	DF	(England) Will Fish	(Scotland) Hibernian	
24 August 2023	30 June 2024	DF	(England) Brandon Williams	(England) Ipswich Town	
1 September 2023	30 June 2024	FW	(England) Mason Greenwood	(Spain) Getafe	
1 September 2023	3 January 2024 (Note: McNeill returned early from his season-long loan at Stevenage on 3 January 2024.)	FW	(England) Charlie McNeill	(England) Stevenage	
1 September 2023	14 January 2024 (Note: Carreras returned early from his season-long loan at Granada on 14 January 2024.)	DF	(Spain) Álvaro Carreras	(Spain) Granada	
1 January 2024	30 June 2024	MF	(Netherlands) Donny van de Beek	(Germany) Eintracht Frankfurt	
11 January 2024	30 June 2024	FW	(England) Jadon Sancho	(Germany) Borussia Dortmund	
12 January 2024	30 June 2024	FW	(England) Joe Hugill	(England) Burton Albion	
15 January 2024	30 June 2024	MF	(Tunisia) Hannibal Mejbri	(Spain) Sevilla	
16 January 2024	30 June 2024	DF	(Spain) Álvaro Carreras	(Portugal) Benfica	
17 January 2024	30 June 2024	MF	(Poland) Maxi Oyedele	(England) Forest Green Rovers	
19 January 2024	30 June 2024	DF	(England) Rhys Bennett	(England) Stockport County	
23 January 2024	30 June 2024	MF	(England) Dan Gore	(England) Port Vale	
25 January 2024	30 June 2024	GK	(Czech Republic) Radek Vítek	(England) Accrington Stanley	
31 January 2024	30 June 2024	MF	(Uruguay) Facundo Pellistri	(Spain) Granada	
1 February 2024	30 June 2024	DF	(England) Sonny Aljofree	(England) Altrincham	
1 February 2024	30 June 2024	FW	(England) Sam Mather	(England) Rochdale	
1 February 2024	30 June 2024	DF	(England) Sam Murray	(England) Rochdale	
1 February 2024	30 June 2024	GK	(England) Tom Wooster	(England) Macclesfield	

== See also ==
- 2023–24 Manchester United W.F.C. season
