= Bruno Fernandes =

Portuguese footballer (born 1994)

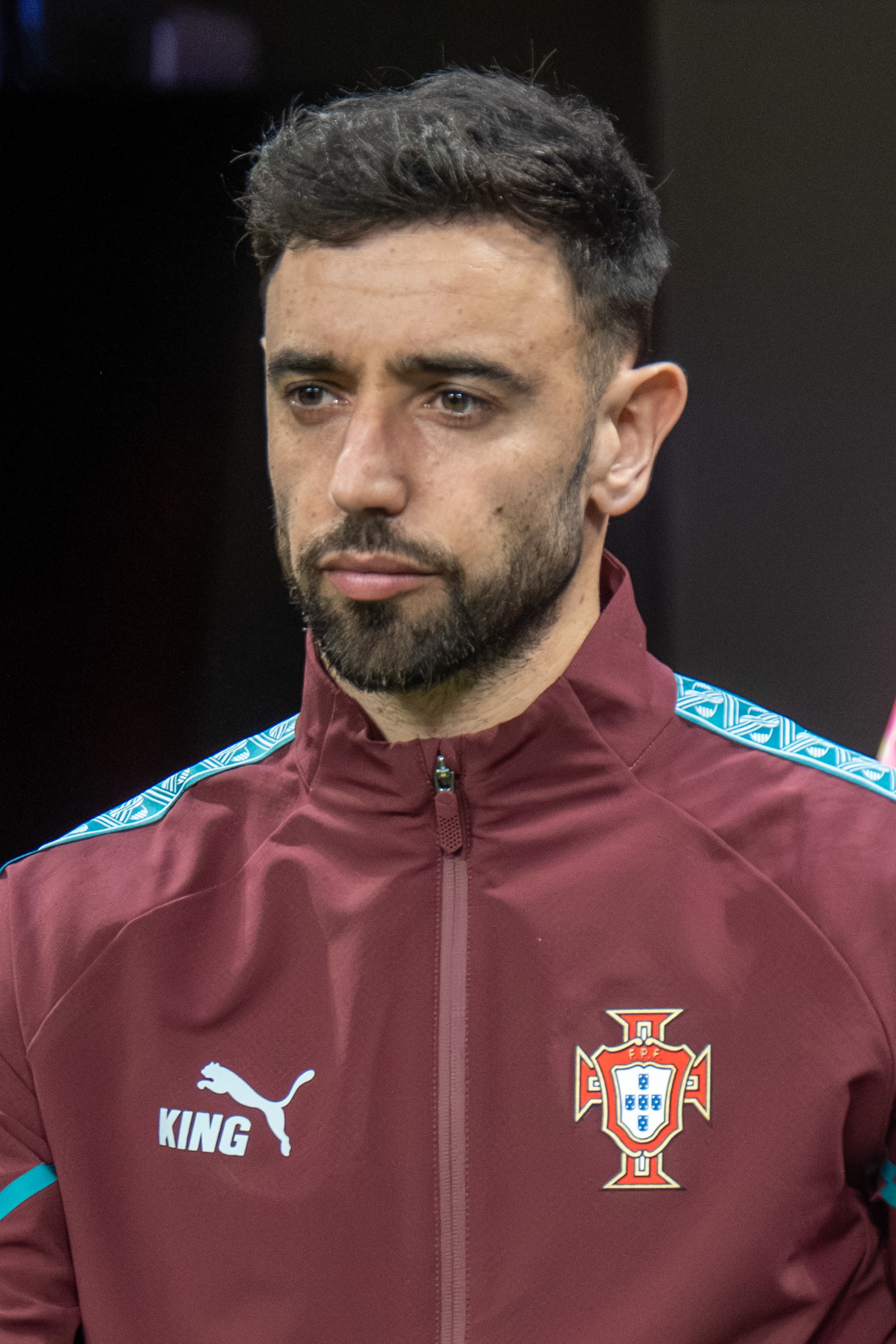
- Fernandes with Portugal in 2026

Personal information
- Full name: Bruno Miguel Borges Fernandes
- Date of birth: 8 September 1994 (age 32)
- Place of birth: Maia, Porto, Portugal
- Height: 1.79 m (5 ft 10 in)
- Position: Attacking midfielder

Team information
- Current team: Manchester United
- Number: 8

Youth career
- 2002–2004: Infesta
- 2004–2012: Boavista
- 2005–2010: → Pasteleira (loan)

Senior career*
Years	Team	Apps	(Gls)
2012–2013	Novara	23	(4)
2013–2016	Udinese	86	(10)
2016–2017	→ Sampdoria (loan)	33	(5)
2017	Sampdoria	0	(0)
2017–2020	Sporting CP	83	(39)
2020–	Manchester United	240	(75)

International career^{‡}
2012	Portugal U19	2	(0)
2014	Portugal U20	5	(1)
2014–2017	Portugal U21	17	(6)
2016	Portugal Olympic	4	(0)
2017–	Portugal	99	(30)
Medal record
Men's football
Representing Portugal
UEFA Nations League
Winner	2019 Portugal
Winner	2025 Germany
- * Club domestic league appearances and goals as of 20:32, 22 November 2026 (UTC) ‡ National team caps and goals as of 23:00, 17 November 2026 (UTC)

Bruno Miguel Borges Fernandes (European Portuguese: [ˈbɾunu fɨɾˈnɐ̃dɨʃ]; born 8 September 1994) is a Portuguese professional footballer who plays as an attacking midfielder for Premier League club Manchester United, which he captains, and the Portugal national team. He is widely regarded as one of the best attacking midfielders in the world.

Fernandes started his career at Italian Serie B side Novara but soon made a move to Serie A side Udinese in 2013, followed by Sampdoria three years later. After five years in Italy, he signed with Sporting CP in 2017. He won back-to-back Taças da Liga in 2018 and 2019, as well as the Taça de Portugal, leading to him being named in the Primeira Liga Team of the Year and Primeira Liga Player of the Year in both seasons. In 2018–19, he scored a record of 33 goals in all competitions, making him the highest-scoring Portuguese midfielder and the highest-scoring midfielder in Europe in a single season.

In January 2020, Fernandes signed with United for an initial €55 million (£47 million), becoming at the time the second-highest fee for a Portuguese player leaving the domestic league. He has become a focal player for United, making more than 300 appearances for the club. Collectively, he has won the FA Cup and EFL Cup; he also contributed to the club reaching the UEFA Europa League final in 2021 and 2025, being the competition's top scorer in those two seasons, and the FA Cup final in 2023. In 2026, Fernandes was awarded the FWA Footballer of the Year, Premier League Player of the Season and PFA Players' Player of the Year. He also won the Premier League Playmaker of the Season for registering 21 assists, simultaneously breaking the record for most assists in a single Premier League season (a joint record in the top 5 leagues alongside Thomas Müller in the Bundesliga and Lionel Messi in La Liga).

Fernandes is a former Portugal youth international, representing his country at under-19, under-20, under-21 and under-23 levels. He represented Portugal at the 2016 Summer Olympics. He made his senior international debut in 2017, and has been capped more than 90 times. Fernandes was chosen in Portugal's squads for the FIFA World Cup in 2018, 2022 and 2026, the UEFA European Championship in 2020 and 2024, and the UEFA Nations League Finals in 2019 and 2025, winning the latter competition both times while also being named to its Team of the Tournament in 2019.

== Early life ==
Fernandes was born in Maia, Metropolitan Area of Porto. Growing up, he supported Boavista and Manchester United. During his childhood, Fernandes used to play football on the streets with his older brother Ricardo, who was also a professional football player. His father, who had emigrated to Switzerland, wanted Fernandes to move with him, but he refused, due to the standard of Swiss football at the time.

== Club career ==
=== Early career ===
Fernandes began his youth career at local club Infesta. Growing up, Fernandes was offered a youth contract at Porto's academy, but he went to local rivals Boavista, who offered him transportation to training, with his parents being unable to take him to Porto on a daily basis. Fernandes played most of his youth football with Boavista, starting his career as a centre-back, before being converted to an attacking midfielder at the age of 15, following a loan to Pasteleira.

=== Spell in Italy ===
==== Novara (2012–2013) ====
On 27 August 2012, he joined Novara in Italy. Fernandes initially struggled in his new life in Italy, after suffering from homesickness and also had problems learning Italian. After his girlfriend moved to Italy, Fernandes quickly learned the language and began settling in the country, being nicknamed the "Maradona of Novara" and the "Mini Rui Costa". After only a few weeks with the youth sides, Fernandes was promoted to the first team in Serie B, and went on to appear in slightly more than half of the league games during the 2012–13 season, helping his team to fifth place and the promotion play-offs.

==== Udinese and Sampdoria (2013–2017) ====
In summer 2013, Serie A clubs Inter Milan and Juventus wanted to sign him, but instead, Fernandes decided to sign for Udinese in a co-ownership deal, which promised him first-team opportunities. He made his debut in Serie A on 3 November, coming on as a second-half substitute in a 0–3 home loss against Inter Milan. Fernandes scored his first league goal on 7 December, in a 3–3 draw at Napoli. He scored again in the second match between the sides, a 1–1 draw.

On 16 August 2016, Fernandes moved to Sampdoria on loan with an obligation to be signed permanently. He made his league debut twelve days later, playing six minutes in a 2–1 home win over Atalanta. Fernandes scored his first goal for his new team on 26 September, in a 1–2 away loss to Cagliari. He scored five goals in 33 Serie A appearances during the campaign, helping them to finish in tenth position.

=== Sporting CP ===
==== 2017–2018: Primeira Liga Player of the Year ====
On 27 June 2017, after returning from the UEFA European Under-21 Championship, Fernandes joined Sporting CP on a five-year deal, for a reported fee of €8.5 million plus bonuses. On 6 August, Fernandes made his debut for the club in a 2–0 home victory against Desportivo das Aves. He scored four goals in his first five Primeira Liga games, including a brace in a 5–0 away win against Vitória de Guimarães. Fernandes' first appearance in the UEFA Champions League group stage was on 12 September, where he put the visitors 3–0 ahead in the 43rd minute of an eventual 3–2 win at Olympiacos. He finished his first season with 16 goals across all competitions, second only to Bas Dost and provided 20 assists, being named in the Primeira Liga Team of the Year and Primeira Liga Player of the Year.

On 15 May 2018, Fernandes and several of his teammates, including coaches, were injured following an attack by around 50 Sporting supporters at the club's training ground after the team finished third in the league and missed out on Champions League qualification. Despite the events, the team agreed to play in the final of the Taça de Portugal scheduled for the following weekend, eventually losing to Desportivo das Aves. Fernandes was named the Primeira Liga Player of the Year on 6 July. Four days later he signed a new five-year contract with a €100 million release clause, having turned back on his original decision to leave the Estádio José Alvalade following the departure of club president Bruno de Carvalho, and being given an improved salary in the process.

==== 2018–2020: Highest-scoring midfielder in Europe ====
Fernandes scored his 23rd competitive goal of the 2018–19 campaign during a 3–1 home win against Portimonense on 3 March 2019, through a late penalty, surpassing António Oliveira's club record for goals by a midfielder in a season, set in 1981–82. On 5 May, he scored a hat-trick in an 8–1 away rout of Belenenses SAD, in the process becoming the highest-scoring Portuguese midfielder in a single season of all time, with 31 goals to his name. He scored his 33rd and final goal of the season on 25 May 2019, during Sporting's victory against Porto in the Taça de Portugal final. He was named Primeira Liga Player of the Year for the second successive year for his performances in the 2018–19 season.

He scored seven goals in his first 10 appearances of the 2019–20 season, including a run of scoring in six consecutive appearances. This made him the third Sporting player in the 21st century to score in six or more consecutive appearances for the club, after Mário Jardel and Bas Dost. On 28 November, he scored twice and assisted the other two goals in a 4–0 victory over PSV Eindhoven, which guaranteed Sporting qualification to the knockout stages of the UEFA Europa League.

=== Manchester United ===
==== 2019–2020: Europa League top scorer ====
On 29 January 2020, English club Manchester United confirmed they had reached an agreement with Sporting to sign Fernandes for a fee reportedly worth up to €80 million (£67.6 million), subject to him passing a medical and agreeing personal terms. The transfer was officially completed the following day, for an initial fee of around €55 million (£47 million), plus up to €25 million (£21 million) in add-ons and 10% of the profits of a future sale. Fernandes signed a five-and-a-half-year contract.

He made his debut on 1 February, playing the full 90 minutes of a goalless home draw to Wolverhampton Wanderers. In United's 2–0 away win over Chelsea on 17 February, he provided an assist for the second goal, a header from Harry Maguire. Fernandes came on as a late substitute against Club Brugge in a 1–1 draw on his European debut for the club. He scored his first United goal against Watford on 23 February, converting from the penalty spot in a 3–0 victory at Old Trafford, a match in which he also provided an assist for the third goal scored by Mason Greenwood. His first European goal for the club came in the second leg of their UEFA Europa League round of 32 tie against Club Brugge at Old Trafford, in which he scored a penalty, helping them to a 5–0 victory. On 16 March, Fernandes was voted as the Premier League Player of the Month for February.

On 30 June, Fernandes scored his first brace for the club in a 3–0 win over Brighton & Hove Albion. For his performances in June, he won multiple club and Premier League awards, including Premier League Player of the Month and Goal of the Month, becoming the first player to win both awards concurrently in Premier League history. He also became the first Manchester United player to win back to back Premier League Player of the Month awards since Cristiano Ronaldo in the 2006–07 season. In September, Fernandes was named as the winner of Manchester United's Sir Matt Busby Player of the Year award, given to the club's best player from the previous season.

==== 2020–2021: Individual success and Europa League final ====
On 26 September, Fernandes scored his first goal of the season against Brighton & Hove Albion in the 100th minute of a 3–2 win at the Amex Stadium; it was one of the latest goals in Premier League history, and came after referee Chris Kavanagh had blown the final whistle, before a video assistant referee awarded United a penalty which Fernandes converted. On 7 November, Fernandes scored a brace and provided an assist against Everton to secure a 3–1 away win. He was named Premier League Player of the Month for November in recognition of his four goals and one assist that month, and again in December after scoring three goals and providing four assists in that month, becoming the first player to win the award four times in a single calendar year. He scored one goal and made two assists in United's Premier League record-equalling 9–0 home win against Southampton on 2 February 2021. He finished third in terms of top goalscorers in the league with 18 goals and second among the top assist providers with 12.

In April, a day after United had announced their plan to join the European Super League along with 11 other clubs, Fernandes became the first potential European Super League player to comment on this, stating his disapproval: "Dreams can't be [bought]." By the next day, United withdrew from the prospective league, which was also announced to be "suspended" that day, amid a backlash from players, managers, football institutions, politicians, fans and the media. On 29 April, he scored twice and assisted two more goals in a 6–2 home win over Roma in the first leg of the Europa League semi-finals; and provided an assist in a 3–2 defeat in the return leg, which allowed United to advance to the final 8–5 on aggregate. On 18 May, he was named as the winner of the Sir Matt Busby Player of the Year award for the second successive season. On 26 May, United drew 1–1 against Villarreal after extra-time, in the Europa League Final, but eventually lost on penalties, despite Fernandes netting his spot kick in the shoot-out.

==== 2021–2022: Champions League top assist provider ====
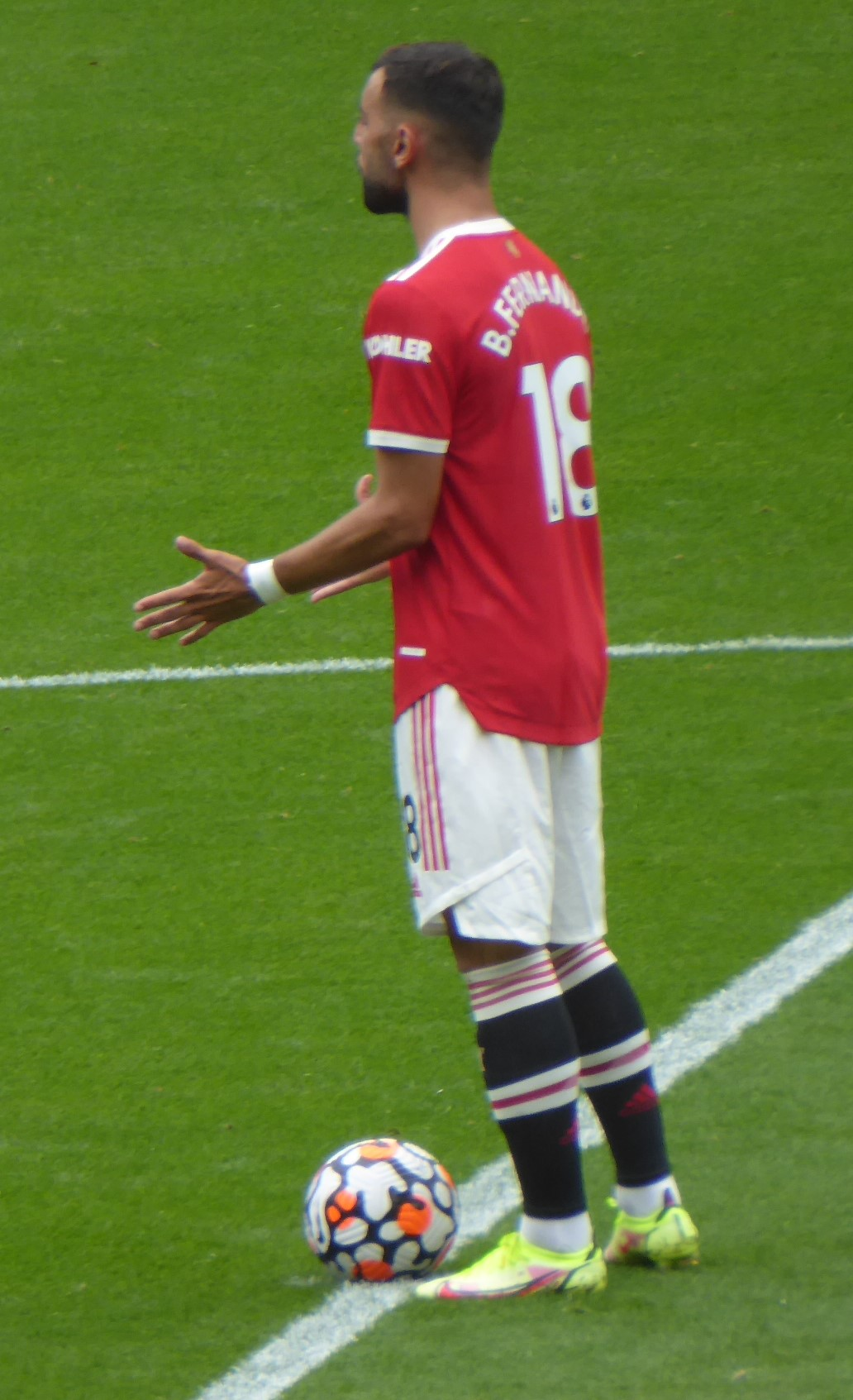
Fernandes appearing for Manchester United in a Premier League match against Leeds United during the 2021–22 season

On 14 August, in the opening match of the Premier League season, Fernandes scored a hat-trick against Leeds United in a 5–1 win. He then scored in the team's next home game against Newcastle United, before missing a last minute penalty against Aston Villa two weeks later that would have salvaged a 1–1 draw. He later posted an apology for his penalty miss on Instagram. On 23 November, Fernandes provided an assist for Jadon Sancho in United's 2–0 victory away against Villarreal in the Champions League, to ensure his team qualification to the round of 16, becoming the first player to provide an assist in five consecutive matches of a Champions League campaign for an English club. On 2 December, Fernandes made his 100th appearance for the club, opening the scoring in United's 3–2 home win over rivals Arsenal at Old Trafford.

On 1 April 2022, Fernandes signed a new contract which would keep him at United until June 2026, with the option of a further year. On 2 May, he scored his 50th goal for United in the club's 3–0 home win over Brentford. His performances declined during the season, with Fernandes alongside his teammates struggling and under-performing and with United supporters becoming increasingly frustrated by Fernandes' complaints to referees during matches, and with the club finishing a disappointing sixth place, qualifying for the UEFA Europa League, despite Fernandes being the top assist provider in the 2021–22 UEFA Champions League, with seven assists in total.

==== 2022–2023: Ending the trophy drought ====
On 1 July 2022, United announced that they had changed Fernandes' squad number from 18 to his preferred number 8, the same number he wore during his time for Sporting CP and as a tribute to his birth date and his father, upon the departure of Juan Mata. Fernandes scored his first goal of the season on 27 August in a 1–0 away win against Southampton.

On 3 January 2023, Fernandes made his 150th appearance for the club, assisting Marcus Rashford's goal in United's 3–0 home win over Bournemouth. Two weeks later, he was instrumental in United's 2–1 comeback win over Manchester City in the Manchester derby, scoring a goal that was part of the build-up play for United's controversial equaliser despite Rashford being in an offside position, helping United to extend their winning run to nine in all competitions. On 18 January, Fernandes scored in a 1–1 away draw to Crystal Palace, registering his 100th goal contribution for the club. He also became the United midfielder with the second most goal contributions in the Premier League, only behind Paul Scholes. On 26 February, Fernandes started in the 2023 EFL Cup final as United beat Newcastle United 2–0 at Wembley Stadium, winning his first trophy with the club.

Fernandes created the most chances (119) in the 2022–23 Premier League, the highest on record since 2003–04 by a United player in a single campaign. United qualified for the 2023–24 UEFA Champions League after securing a third-place finish in the Premier League. In the 2023 FA Cup final, Fernandes equalised for United through a penalty in an eventual 2–1 defeat to local rivals Manchester City.

==== 2023–present: Club captaincy, FA Cup win, and assist record ====
On 20 July 2023, Fernandes was named as Harry Maguire's replacement as club captain. On 26 August, Fernandes scored his first goal of the season, netting a penalty, and also assisting Casemiro in a 3–2 comeback win over Nottingham Forest. The following months, United endured a difficult start to the season, most notably in the Premier League and Champions League, finishing last in their group. Fernandes' captaincy came under scrutiny, despite being the football player who played the most minutes in world football, with 72 games and 6,666 minutes dating from 15 September 2022 to 2023. In January 2024, during the winter transfer window, Fernandes was the recipient of a contract offer worth €100 million from Saudi Pro League side Al-Hilal. If he had accepted the offer, he would have joined his national teammate Rúben Neves, as well as former manager Jorge Jesus, who was keen on signing him. However, the deal was eventually turned down by Fernandes, who felt he had unfinished business at United, stating that he was "happy [...] focused on Man United".

On 7 April 2024, Fernandes scored his 50th Premier League goal from 50 yards (46 m) in a 2–2 draw against United's arch rivals Liverpool at Old Trafford. He was then named Manchester United Player of the Month for April after scoring seven goals in six appearances that month. On 23 May, Fernandes won the Sir Matt Busby Player of the Year, becoming a three-time recipient of the award. In the 2024 FA Cup final against local rivals Manchester City, Fernandes assisted Kobbie Mainoo's goal in an eventual 2–1 win for United, winning his second trophy with the club and his first as club captain. After the match, pundit and former United midfielder Roy Keane praised Fernandes: "I've been critical of Bruno over the years, but I've been proven wrong, his leadership was outstanding. I've always mentioned how brilliant he is as a player." In July, Fernandes was linked with a move to Saudi Arabia, with two clubs in the Saudi Pro League interested in him, but these rumours were dispelled in August when his contract with Manchester United was extended to 30 June 2027.

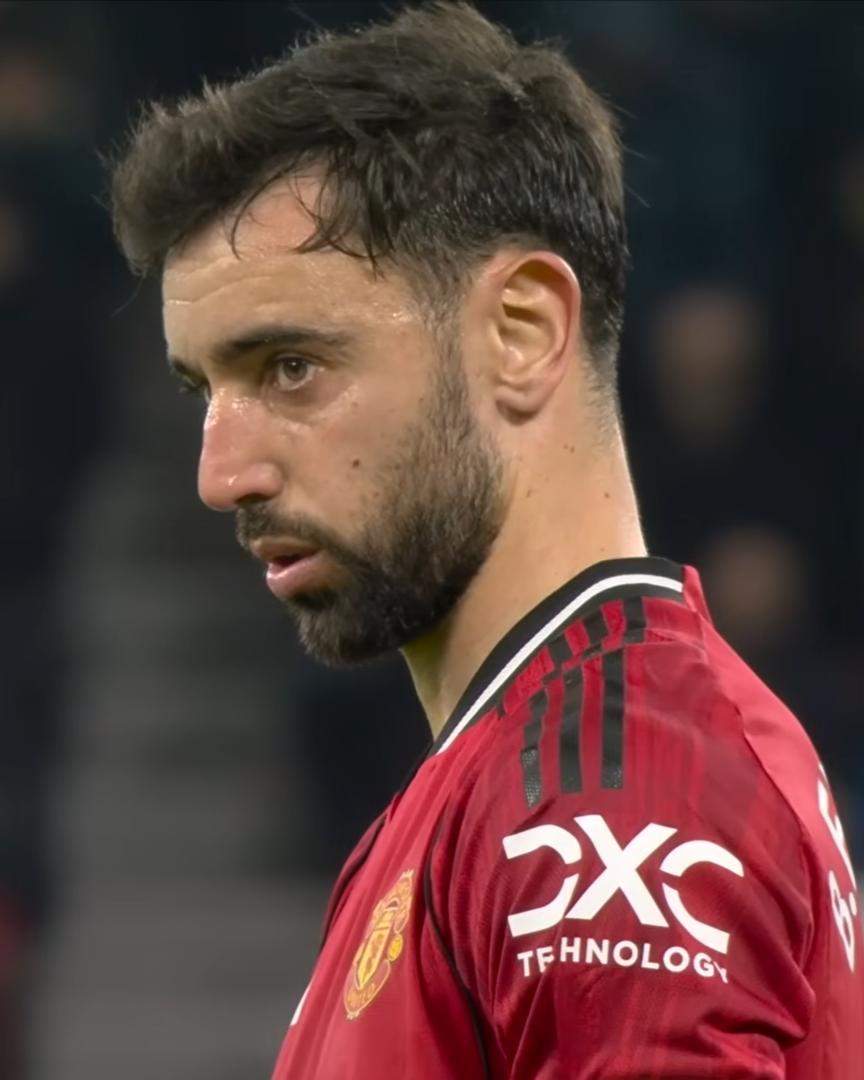
Fernandes with Manchester United in 2025

On 29 September, Fernandes was sent off for a high challenge on James Maddison in United's 3–0 loss to Tottenham Hotspur at Old Trafford. However, the red card was overturned by The Football Association, following a successful claim of wrongful dismissal by the referee. On 3 October, he was sent off for the second time in five days when he received two yellow cards in a 3–3 draw with Porto in the UEFA Europa League. This made him the first United player to be sent off in consecutive matches since Eric Cantona in March 1994. He made his 250th appearance for the club on 11 November, scoring the opening goal and assisting Alejandro Garnacho in a 3–0 win against Leicester City. In the 2–0 loss to Wolverhampton on 26 December, Fernandes received his third red card this season, becoming the first United player to receive three red cards in a season since Nemanja Vidić in the 2008–09 season. On 13 March 2025, Fernandes scored a hat-trick against Real Sociedad in a 4–1 second leg of the round of 16 in the UEFA Europa League, with a final score line of 5–2 across the two-legged tie. His performances in March, with two goals and two assists, including a 'sensational' direct free-kick against Arsenal earned Fernandes his fifth Premier League Player of the Month award. On 20 June, it was announced that Fernandes was one of six nominees for the PFA Players' Player of the Year.

On 30 August 2025, Fernandes scored his first Premier League goal of the 2025–26 season, a 97th minute penalty to win the game 3–2 against Burnley. A month later, on 20 September, Fernandes made his 200th league appearance for United against Chelsea, in which he scored his 100th goal for the club across all competitions in a 2–1 win. After scoring in a 2–0 home win against Tottenham Hotspur on 7 February 2026, Fernandes became the second fastest player to make 200 goal contributions in Manchester United's history, with 104 goals and 96 assists. On 15 March, Fernandes set a new Manchester United record for most assists in a single Premier League season when he registered his 16th assist of the 2025–26 campaign in a 3–1 win over Aston Villa, surpassing the previous mark of 15 set by David Beckham in 1999–2000. On 8 May, Fernandes was named as the FWA Footballer of the Year, owing to his eight goals and 19 assists in the Premier League thus far. He became the first Manchester United player to win the award since Wayne Rooney in 2010. On 17 May, Fernandes equalled the Premier League record for most assists in a single season, registering his 20th assist of the 2025–26 campaign in Manchester United's match against Nottingham Forest. The record was previously held jointly by Thierry Henry and Kevin De Bruyne. On 23 May, he was announced as the 2025–26 Premier League Player of the Season. He broke the Premier League single-season assist record on 24 May, after registering his 21st assist of the campaign in Manchester United's 3–0 away victory against Brighton & Hove Albion, setting up Patrick Dorgu.

On 25 August 2026, Fernandes was named the PFA Players' Player of the Year for 2025–26, and also named in the PFA Team of the Year. Five days later, he scored a hat-trick in a 5–2 victory over Ipswich Town.

== International career ==
=== 2012–2017: Youth level ===
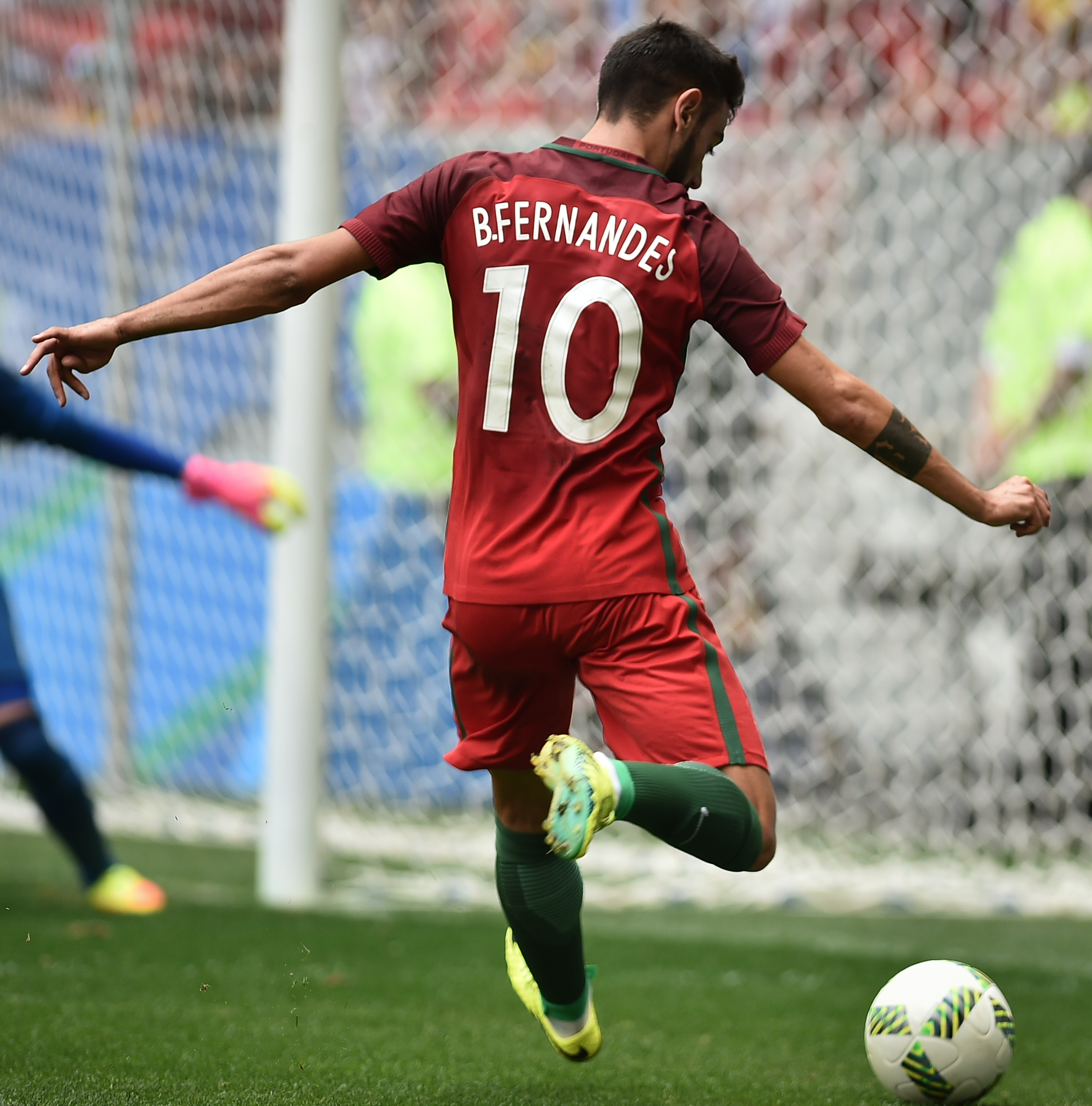
Fernandes playing for Portugal at the 2016 Summer Olympics

With the Portugal under-20s, Fernandes participated in the 2014 Toulon Tournament. In this competition, he played four out, scoring against Chile in a group stage match, helping Portugal to a third-place finish.

Fernandes represented Portugal at under-19, under-20, under-21 and under-23 levels, for a total of 28 caps. Prior to his international debut, he was named captain of the under-21 team by coach Rui Jorge. He scored four goals and provided four assist in Portugal under-21s qualification campaign, helping them to qualify for the 2017 UEFA European Under-21 Championship. In June, Fernandes took part in the 2017 UEFA European Under-21 Championship, helping Portugal to a group stage finish, and scoring a goal against Serbia in the opening match.

Fernandes represented Portugal in the 2016 Summer Olympics. He started every game, as the team reached the quarter-finals.

=== 2017–2018: Senior and World Cup debuts ===
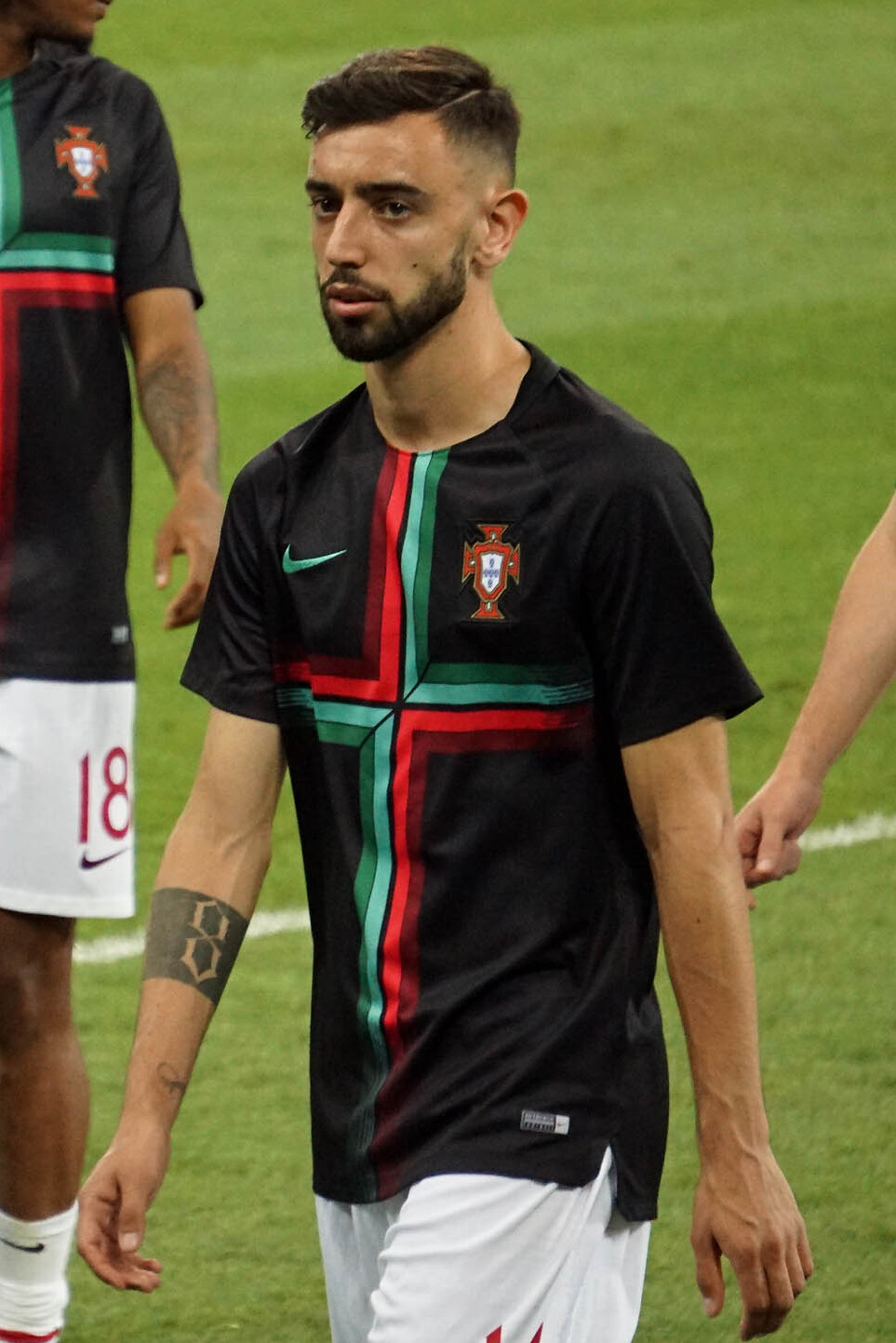
Fernandes with Portugal at the 2018 FIFA World Cup

Overlooked for selection by Portugal during his spell in Italy, Fernandes was first chosen on 28 August 2017, replacing the injured Pizzi for 2018 World Cup qualifiers against the Faroe Islands and Hungary to be played the next month, although he did not play in either match. Fernandes won his first full cap on 10 November 2017, replacing Manuel Fernandes for the last 34 minutes of the 3–0 friendly win over Saudi Arabia in Viseu.

He was then selected by Fernando Santos for the 2018 FIFA World Cup in Russia. He scored his first goal on 7 June with a header in the last warm-up match before the tournament, a 3–0 defeat of Algeria at the Estádio da Luz. Fernandes' first World Cup game took place on 15 June, when he played 66 minutes in a 3–3 group stage draw against Spain, being booked in the process. On 30 June, Portugal were eliminated following a 2–1 defeat to Uruguay in the last 16.

=== 2018–Present: Nations League titles and tournament struggles ===
Fernandes was selected for three matches in the league phase of the 2018–19 UEFA Nations League group stage, helping the hosts Portugal qualify to the inaugural Nations League Finals in June 2019. In the UEFA Nations League Finals, Fernandes played both matches as Portugal defeated the Netherlands 1–0 in Porto to win the trophy. For his performances throughout the competition, he was named in the "Team of the Tournament".

Fernandes was named in Portugal's final squad for the delayed UEFA Euro 2020 tournament, appearing in all games of the eventual round of 16 exit to Belgium. Fernandes went on to be criticised for his performances during the tournament as he struggled to replicate his club form for Portugal. After being heavily fatigued and overshadowed by other teammates, he was dropped from the starting line-up for the final group stage match.

On 29 March 2022, Fernandes scored both goals in Portugal's 2–0 win over North Macedonia in the final of the World Cup qualification play-offs to ensure Portugal's qualification for the 2022 tournament in Qatar.

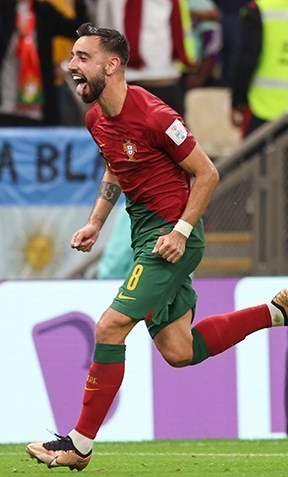
Fernandes after scoring in a group stage game against Uruguay at the 2022 FIFA World Cup

In October, he was named in Portugal's preliminary 55-man squad for the 2022 FIFA World Cup in Qatar, being included in the final 26-man squad for the tournament. On 25 November, Fernandes provided two assists in Portugal's 3–2 group stage win against Ghana. Three days later, Fernandes scored both of Portugal's goals in a 2–0 victory over Uruguay, securing his team's qualification to the knockout stages. On 6 December, he provided an assist for Pepe, who scored Portugal's second goal in a thrashing 6–1 win in the round of 16 match against Switzerland and became the second-oldest player to ever score in the tournament. Portugal were eliminated in the quarter-finals after losing 1–0 to Morocco. Despite Portugal's elimination, Fernandes finished the tournament as the joint-top assister with three assists.

His World Cup form continued during the UEFA Euro 2024 qualifiers in March, providing two assists and a brace against Bosnia and Herzegovina in a 3–0 win on 17 June. On 8 September, on his 29th birthday, Fernandes scored the only goal of an away win over Slovakia. On 11 September, he scored a goal and provided a hat-trick of assists in a 9–0 home defeat of Luxembourg, the former's biggest win in international history. In the reverse fixture against Slovakia, on 13 November, Fernandes provided a brace of assists in a 3–2 win, leading Portugal to qualify for Euro 2024, marking the nation's fastest qualification to a major tournament in their history. Fernandes finished the qualifying campaign as the top assister with eight assists, with Portugal topping their qualifying group, and setting a new national team record of ten consecutive wins.

On 21 May 2024, he was selected in the 26-man squad for the UEFA Euro 2024. On 22 June, Fernandes scored Portugal's third goal in a 3–0 win against Turkey, securing his country's qualification to the knockout phase. In Portugal's round of 16 match against Slovenia, he played the full 120 minutes and scored the team's second kick of the penalty shootout which they won 3–0. Portugal were eliminated in the quarter-finals to France after losing 5–3 in another penalty shootout.

On 16 November 2025, Fernandes scored a hat-trick in a 9–1 win over Armenia during the FIFA World Cup qualification, securing his nation's spot at the 2026 tournament in North America.

On 19 May 2026, Fernandes was selected in the 26-man squad for the 2026 FIFA World Cup.

== Player profile ==
=== Style of play ===
An attacking midfielder, Fernandes is a direct, energetic box-to-box playmaker who is capable of both taking on defenders and setting the rhythm of play. Directness also means that Fernandes tends to take a lot of risks with the type and level of passes he attempts to complete. However, despite being prone to turnovers, he typically presses the opposition right after losing possession. Fernandes boasts a prolific goalscoring record from the midfield position. He frequently shoots from outside the penalty area and is an accurate free-kick and penalty taker. His movement off the ball is also key, with him often roaming around the attacking areas of the pitch, or dropping deep to pick up possession. As well as operating in the attacking midfielder role, he can also operate in a deeper central midfield role, or as a second striker. During his time at Manchester United, under Erik ten Hag, Fernandes also played on the right wing on many occasions, due to his crossing ability, which made him an effective assist provider.

=== Reception and image ===
Regarding his creativity and goalscoring ability, since joining the Premier League in 2020, Fernandes has created more chances than any other player in the competition. In the 2025–26 season, he set a new Premier League record for the most assists in a single campaign with 21, surpassing the previous record of 20 assists jointly held by Thierry Henry in 2002–03 and Kevin De Bruyne in 2019–20, Manchester City manager Pep Guardiola once said, "Bruno's influence is outstanding. Unbelievable. Today saw a few games, the last games and I said: 'this guy's creativity is one of the best I've ever seen'." In 2023, Manchester City and Belgian midfielder Kevin De Bruyne rated him as the best player in his position in Premier League commenting, "I think he's [Fernandes] a creative machine and just in general." former Manchester United defender Rio Ferdinand commented that Fernandes "is a player who knows how to create chances [...], who can for bit of imagination, creativity, the patience around the box, the ability to hit a ball from the edge of the box an put in the back of net, [...] manipulate and take ball". Ferdinand also praised his leadership abilities, stating "he was one of the players in the game that lead's by example". Former Manchester United coach Ole Gunnar Solskjær stated that Fernandes was a "bit of a mix between Paul Scholes and Juan Sebastián Verón". Fernandes goalscoring abilities have also drew comparisons with former Chelsea midfielder Frank Lampard, after breaking his record of being the highest-scoring midfielder in Europe in a single season.

During his career, Fernandes has faced criticism for his on-field behaviour, particularly regarding his body language and emotional reactions. Pundits such as Gary Neville and Roy Keane have criticised his tendency to complain to referees, wave his arms in frustration, and visibly criticise teammates during matches. Neville has described his behaviour as "petulant" and suggested that such actions are unhelpful for a captain tasked with leading by example. Similarly, Keane has questioned Fernandes' leadership qualities, criticizing him for "moaning and whinging" when the team was struggling, arguing that a captain should display resilience and composure. Despite his significant contributions on the pitch, critics argue that his emotional outbursts and confrontational approach undermine his leadership and set a negative tone for the team.

=== Goal celebration ===
Fernandes has adopted a particular goalscoring celebration throughout his career: after scoring a goal, he usually celebrates by covering his ears with both of his hands, as a tribute to his daughter, who covers her ears pretending not to hear him.

== Sponsorship ==
Fernandes is sponsored by sportswear company Nike. He wears Nike Mercurial Vapor boots.

== Personal life ==
When Fernandes moved to Italy at age 18 to join Novara, he was joined there by childhood sweetheart Ana Pinho; they married in 2015. The couple have a daughter (January 2017) and a son (September 2020). He has tattoos on both of his arms with the number 8, in which he tributes to his birth date and to his father, who was also a footballer and wore the number 8 shirt, during his playing career, the letter F symbolising his surname and the number 23 as a tribute to his debut with the Portugal national football team, when he was aged 23.

Fernandes is multilingual; apart from his native Portuguese, he is fluent in Spanish, English, and Italian. He also speaks some French.

Fernandes also has a brother named Ricardo who plays in the ninth tier of English football for Roffey.

== Career statistics ==
=== Club ===
As of match played 22 November 2026

Appearances and goals by club, season and competition
Club	Season	League			National cup (Note: Includes Coppa Italia, Taça de Portugal, FA Cup)		League cup (Note: Includes Taça da Liga, EFL Cup)		Europe		Other		Total	
Club	Season	Division	Apps	Goals	Apps	Goals	Apps	Goals	Apps	Goals	Apps	Goals	Apps	Goals
Novara	2012–13	Serie B	21	4	0	0	—		—		2 (Note: Appearances in Serie B promotion play-offs)	0	23	4
Udinese	2013–14	Serie A	24	4	4	0	—		0	0	—		28	4
Udinese	2014–15	Serie A	31	3	3	1	—		—		—		34	4
Udinese	2015–16	Serie A	31	3	2	0	—		—		—		33	3
Udinese	Total		86	10	9	1	—		0	0	—		95	11
Sampdoria	2016–17	Serie A	33	5	2	0	—		—		—		35	5
Sporting CP	2017–18	Primeira Liga	33	11	5	1	4	0	14 (Note: Eight appearances and one goal in UEFA Champions League, six appearances and three goals in UEFA Europa League)	4	—		56	16
Sporting CP	2018–19	Primeira Liga	33	20	7	7	5	3	8 (Note: Appearances in UEFA Europa League)	3	—		53	33
Sporting CP	2019–20	Primeira Liga	17	8	1	0	4	2	5	5	1 (Note: Appearance in Supertaça Cândido de Oliveira)	0	28	15
Sporting CP	Total		83	39	13	8	13	5	27	12	1	0	137	64
Manchester United	2019–20	Premier League	14	8	3	1	—		5	3	—		22	12
Manchester United	2020–21	Premier League	37	18	3	1	3	0	15 (Note: Six appearances and four goals in UEFA Champions League, nine appearances and five goals in UEFA Europa League)	9	—		58	28
Manchester United	2021–22	Premier League	36	10	2	0	1	0	7 (Note: Appearances in UEFA Champions League)	0	—		46	10
Manchester United	2022–23	Premier League	37	8	6	3	5	2	11	1	—		59	14
Manchester United	2023–24	Premier League	35	10	6	3	1	0	6	2	—		48	15
Manchester United	2024–25	Premier League	36	8	3	2	3	2	14	7	1 (Note: Appearance in FA Community Shield)	0	57	19
Manchester United	2025–26	Premier League	35	9	1	0	1	0	—		—		37	9
Manchester United	2026–27	Premier League	10	4	0	0	1	0	4	2	—		15	6
Manchester United	Total		240	75	24	10	15	4	62	24	1	0	342	113
Career total			463	133	48	19	28	9	89	36	4	0	632	197

=== International ===
As of match played 17 November 2026

Appearances and goals by national team and year
National team	Year	Apps	Goals
Portugal	2017	2	0
Portugal	2018	9	1
Portugal	2019	8	1
Portugal	2020	6	0
Portugal	2021	15	4
Portugal	2022	13	7
Portugal	2023	10	6
Portugal	2024	13	6
Portugal	2025	9	3
Portugal	2026	14	2
Total		99	30

As of match played 17 November 2026
Portugal score listed first, score column indicates score after each Fernandes goal.

List of international goals scored by Bruno Fernandes
No.	Date	Venue	Opponent	Score	Result	Competition
1	7 June 2018	Estádio da Luz, Lisbon, Portugal	Algeria	2–0	3–0	Friendly
2	17 November 2019	Stade Josy Barthel, Luxembourg City, Luxembourg	Luxembourg	1–0	2–0	UEFA Euro 2020 qualifying
3	9 June 2021	Estádio José Alvalade, Lisbon, Portugal	Israel	1–0	4–0	Friendly
4	9 June 2021	Estádio José Alvalade, Lisbon, Portugal	Israel	4–0	4–0	Friendly
5	4 September 2021	Nagyerdei Stadion, Debrecen, Hungary	Qatar	3–1	3–1	Friendly
6	12 October 2021	Estádio Algarve, Faro/Loulé, Portugal	Luxembourg	3–0	5–0	2022 FIFA World Cup qualification
7	29 March 2022	Estádio do Dragão, Porto, Portugal	North Macedonia	1–0	2–0	2022 FIFA World Cup qualification
8	29 March 2022	Estádio do Dragão, Porto, Portugal	North Macedonia	2–0	2–0	2022 FIFA World Cup qualification
9	24 September 2022	Fortuna Arena, Prague, Czech Republic	Czech Republic	2–0	4–0	2022–23 UEFA Nations League A
10	17 November 2022	Estádio José Alvalade, Lisbon, Portugal	Nigeria	1–0	4–0	Friendly
11	17 November 2022	Estádio José Alvalade, Lisbon, Portugal	Nigeria	2–0	4–0	Friendly
12	28 November 2022	Lusail Stadium, Lusail, Qatar	Uruguay	1–0	2–0	2022 FIFA World Cup
13	28 November 2022	Lusail Stadium, Lusail, Qatar	Uruguay	2–0	2–0	2022 FIFA World Cup
14	17 June 2023	Estádio da Luz, Lisbon, Portugal	Bosnia and Herzegovina	2–0	3–0	UEFA Euro 2024 qualifying
15	17 June 2023	Estádio da Luz, Lisbon, Portugal	Bosnia and Herzegovina	3–0	3–0	UEFA Euro 2024 qualifying
16	8 September 2023	Tehelné pole, Bratislava, Slovakia	Slovakia	1–0	1–0	UEFA Euro 2024 qualifying
17	11 September 2023	Estádio Algarve, Faro/Loulé, Portugal	Luxembourg	8–0	9–0	UEFA Euro 2024 qualifying
18	16 October 2023	Bilino Polje Stadium, Zenica, Bosnia and Herzegovina	Bosnia and Herzegovina	3–0	5–0	UEFA Euro 2024 qualifying
19	19 November 2023	Estádio José Alvalade, Lisbon, Portugal	Iceland	1–0	2–0	UEFA Euro 2024 qualifying
20	21 March 2024	Estádio D. Afonso Henriques, Guimarães, Portugal	Sweden	3–0	5–2	Friendly
21	4 June 2024	Estádio José Alvalade, Lisbon, Portugal	Finland	3–0	4–2	Friendly
22	4 June 2024	Estádio José Alvalade, Lisbon, Portugal	Finland	4–2	4–2	Friendly
23	22 June 2024	Westfalenstadion, Dortmund, Germany	Turkey	3–0	3–0	UEFA Euro 2024
24	8 September 2024	Estádio da Luz, Lisbon, Portugal	Scotland	1–1	2–1	2024–25 UEFA Nations League A
25	15 November 2024	Estádio do Dragão, Porto, Portugal	Poland	3–0	5–1	2024–25 UEFA Nations League A
26	16 November 2025	Estádio do Dragão, Porto, Portugal	Armenia	5–1	9–1	2026 FIFA World Cup qualification
27	16 November 2025	Estádio do Dragão, Porto, Portugal	Armenia	6–1	9–1	2026 FIFA World Cup qualification
28	16 November 2025	Estádio do Dragão, Porto, Portugal	Armenia	7–1	9–1	2026 FIFA World Cup qualification
29	6 June 2026	Estádio Nacional, Oeiras, Portugal	Chile	2–0	2–1	Friendly
30	17 November 2026	Cardiff City Stadium, Cardiff, Wales	Wales	1–0	3–2	2026–27 UEFA Nations League A

== Honours ==
Sporting CP

- Taça de Portugal: 2018–19
- Taça da Liga: 2017–18, 2018–19

Manchester United

- FA Cup: 2023–24; runner-up: 2022–23
- EFL Cup: 2022–23
- UEFA Europa League runner-up: 2020–21, 2024–25

Portugal

- UEFA Nations League: 2018–19, 2024–25

Individual

- SJPF Young Player of the Month: August 2017, September 2017, October/November 2017, February 2018, April 2018
- Primeira Liga Player of the Month: August 2017, September 2017, April 2018, December 2018, February 2019, March 2019, April 2019
- Primeira Liga Goal of the Month: August 2017, September 2017
- Primeira Liga Team of the Year: 2017–18, 2018–19
- LPFP Primeira Liga Player of the Year: 2017–18, 2018–19
- Taça de Portugal top scorer: 2018–19 (6 goals)
- UEFA Champions League top assist provider: 2021–22
- UEFA Europa League Squad of the Season: 2017–18, 2019–20, 2020–21
- UEFA Europa League Team of the Season: 2024–25
- UEFA Europa League top scorer: 2019–20, 2024–25
- Sporting CP Footballer of the Year: 2018, 2019
- CNID Footballer of the Year: 2019
- UEFA Nations League Finals Team of the Tournament: 2019
- PFA Fans' Premier League Player of the Month: February 2020, June/July 2020
- PFA Team of the Year: 2020–21, 2025–26
- PFA Players' Player of the Year: 2025–26
- FWA Footballer of the Year: 2025–26
- Premier League Player of the Season: 2025–26
- Premier League Playmaker of the Season: 2025–26
- Premier League Fan Team of the Season: 2025–26
- Premier League Player of the Month: February 2020, June 2020, November 2020, December 2020, March 2025, March 2026
- Premier League Goal of the Month: June 2020, February 2021, September 2023
- Sir Matt Busby Player of the Year: 2019–20, 2020–21, 2023–24, 2024–25, 2025–26
- Manchester United Players' Player of the Year: 2024–25, 2025–26
- Manchester United Goal of the Season: 2020–21 (vs. Everton, 6 February 2021)
- FSA Men's Player of the Year Award: 2020
- ESM Team of the Year: 2020–21
