= Alejandro Garnacho =

Argentine footballer (born 2004)

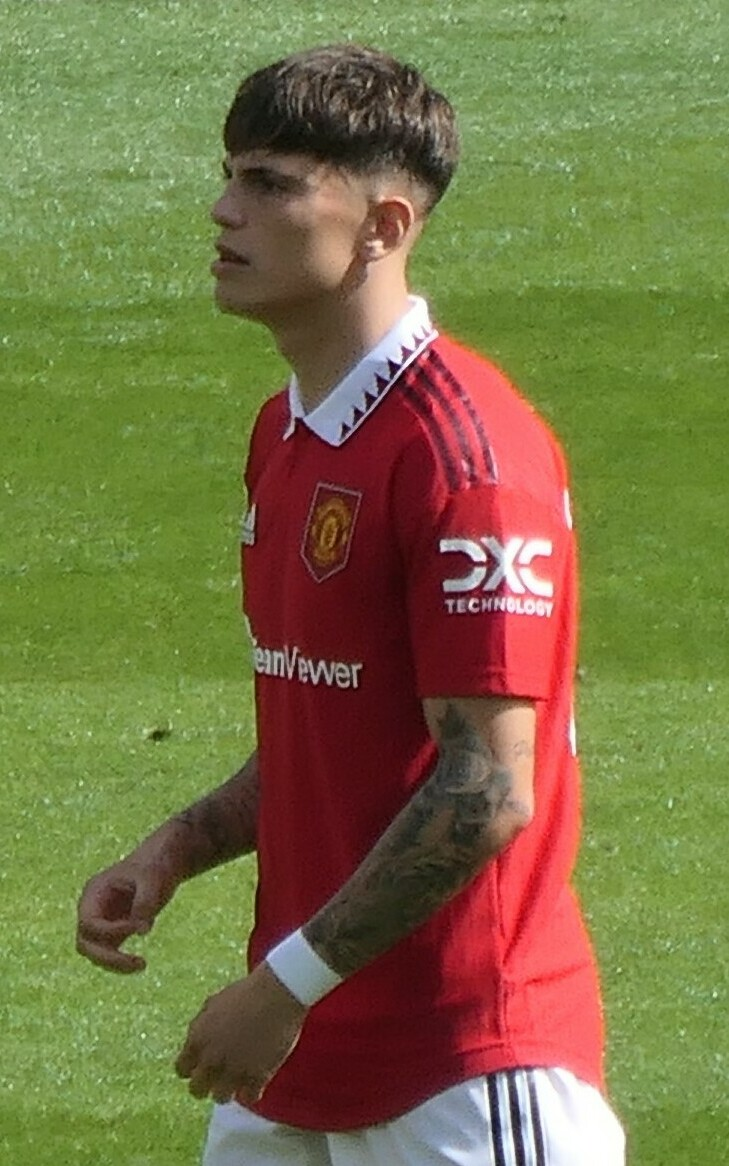
- Garnacho with Manchester United in 2022

Personal information
- Full name: Alejandro Garnacho Ferreyra
- Date of birth: 1 July 2004 (age 22)
- Place of birth: Madrid, Spain
- Height: 1.80 m (5 ft 11 in)
- Position: Winger

Team information
- Current team: Aston Villa (on loan from Chelsea)
- Number: 17

Youth career
- –2015: Getafe
- 2015–2020: Atlético Madrid
- 2020–2022: Manchester United

Senior career*
Years	Team	Apps	(Gls)
2022–2025	Manchester United	93	(16)
2025–	Chelsea	24	(1)
2026–	→ Aston Villa (loan)	4	(0)

International career^{‡}
2021	Spain U18	3	(0)
2022	Argentina U20	5	(4)
2023–	Argentina	8	(0)
Medal record
Men's football
Representing Argentina
Copa América
Winner	2024 United States
- * Club domestic league appearances and goals as of 14:09, 1 November 2026 (UTC) ‡ National team caps and goals as of 03:24, 15 November 2024 (UTC)

Alejandro Garnacho Ferreyra (born 1 July 2004) is a professional footballer who plays as a winger for Premier League club Aston Villa, on loan from Chelsea. Born in Spain, he plays for the Argentina national team.

Garnacho joined Manchester United's youth system from Atlético Madrid in October 2020, winning the FA Youth Cup and the Jimmy Murphy Young Player of the Year award in May 2022. The month prior, he had made his first-team debut at the age of 17. He went on to win the EFL Cup in 2023 and the FA Cup in 2024, scoring in the latter final. He then signed with Chelsea in 2025, before joining Aston Villa on loan in 2026.

Garnacho initially went through the youth ranks of Spain, the country of his birth, before making his debut for Argentina at under-20 level in 2022. He made his debut for the senior Argentina team in June 2023, and was a member of the squad that won the 2024 Copa América title.

== Club career ==
=== Early career ===
Born in Madrid, Garnacho joined Atlético Madrid's youth system in 2015 from Getafe.

=== Manchester United ===
In October 2020, Garnacho joined the Manchester United Academy. United paid Atlético a £420,000 fee. He signed his first professional contract with the club in July 2021. Garnacho came under the spotlight for his solo goal in the FA Youth Cup win over Everton, which was nominated for United's Goal of the Month award for February 2022. After being named as an unused substitute for several Premier League matches, he made his first-team debut for United on 28 April, replacing Anthony Elanga in the 91st minute of a 1–1 draw against Chelsea. Garnacho won the Jimmy Murphy Young Player of the Year award in May. He scored twice in the final of the FA Youth Cup against Nottingham Forest on 11 May, helping United win the competition for the first time since 2011.

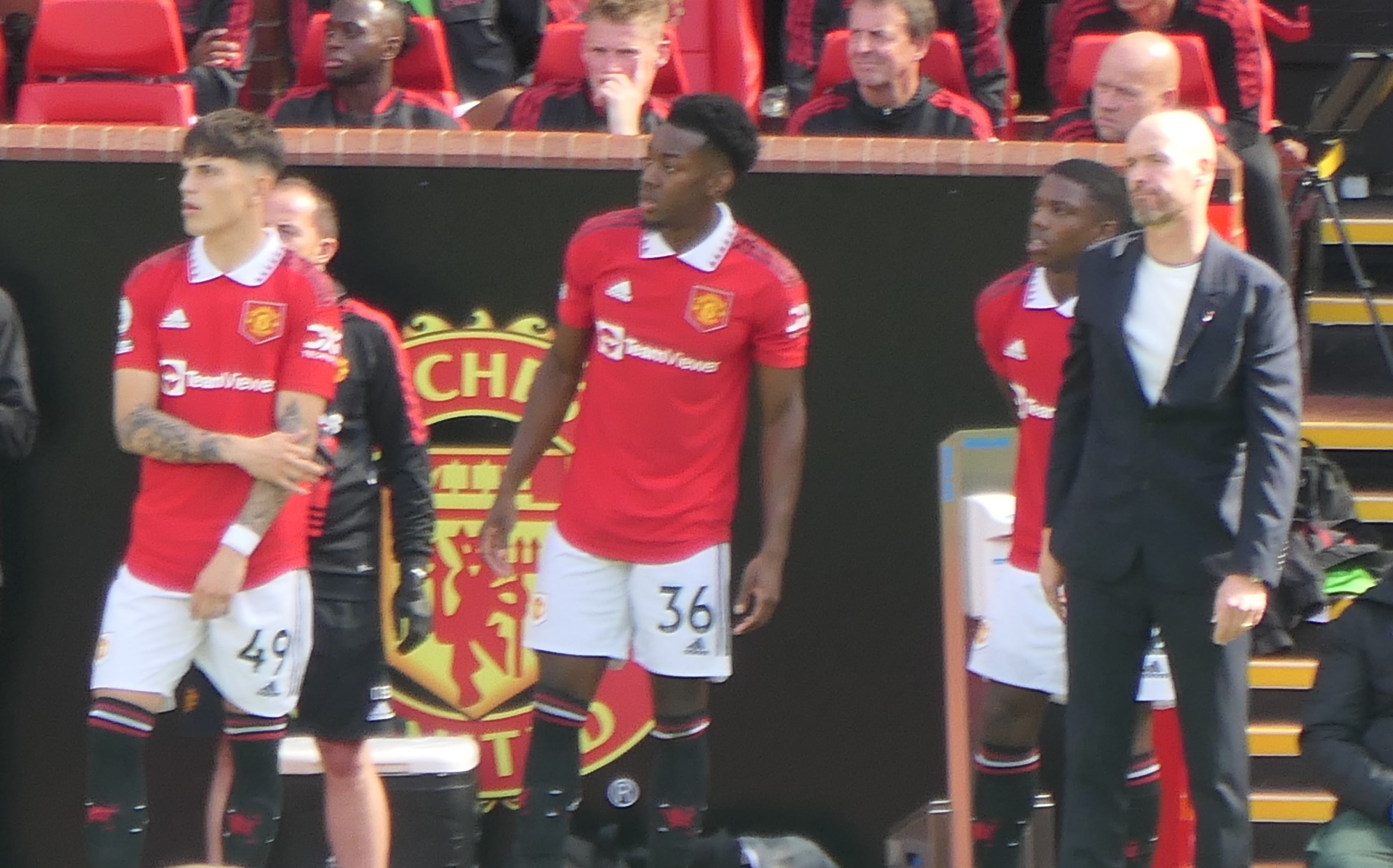
Garnacho (left) with Manchester United in 2022

For the start of the 2022–23 Premier League season, he changed his shirt number from 75 to 49. On 4 October, he scored a late winner for United's U-21 against Barrow in the 2022–23 EFL Trophy. Garnacho made his first senior start for United on 27 October, in a 3–0 win over Moldovan team Sheriff Tiraspol in the UEFA Europa League, whereafter he was praised by manager Erik ten Hag for his improvement over the past few weeks, saying that though previously dissatisfied, he was happy with Garnacho's improved attitude and resilience. On 3 November, he scored his first senior goal in a Europa League match against Real Sociedad with an assist from his idol Cristiano Ronaldo, and scored his first goal in the Premier League on 13 November, an injury-time winner against Fulham. On 14 January 2023 in the Manchester derby, Garnacho set up Marcus Rashford's 82nd-minute winner in a 2–1 win against Manchester City. On 14 March, Garnacho announced he would be sidelined for several weeks after suffering an ankle ligament injury during a game against Southampton. On 28 April, Garnacho signed a new contract extension that will last until 30 June 2028. On 13 May, Garnacho returned from two months out with injury, scoring the second goal in a 2–0 victory against Wolverhampton Wanderers.

At the beginning of the 2023–24 Premier League season, United announced that Garnacho's squad number would be changed from 49 to 17. On 26 November, Garnacho scored his first league goal of the season with a bicycle kick from 15 yards out to open the scoring in a 3–0 win over Everton, earning him the Premier League Goal of the Month for November 2023, and eventually the Premier League Goal of the Season and FIFA Puskas Award. Three days later, he scored his first Champions League goal in a 3–3 away draw against Galatasaray. On 26 December, Garnacho scored two goals in a 3–2 comeback win against Aston Villa. On 4 February 2024, he scored another brace in a 3–0 win over West Ham United. On 4 April, he scored twice once again, this time in a 4–3 away defeat to Chelsea, becoming the first teenager to score braces in three Premier League matches in a single season since Michael Owen in 1998–99. In the FA Cup final on 25 May, Garnacho scored the opening goal in an eventual 2–1 win over Manchester City. His goal in the final was the first for a teenager since Cristiano Ronaldo in 2004, and he also became the second Argentinian to score after Ricardo Villa's brace for Tottenham Hotspur also against City in 1981.

On 10 August, Garnacho opened the scoring against Manchester City in the FA Community Shield. The match eventually ended in a 1–1 draw and went to penalties, and although Garnacho converted his penalty, United lost the shoot-out 7–6. On 17 September, he scored two goals and provided two assists in United's 7–0 rout of Barnsley in the third round of the EFL Cup. On 27 October, Garnacho made his 100th appearance for United in a 2–1 defeat to West Ham at London Stadium; manager Erik ten Hag was sacked less than 24 hours after the result, with assistant Ruud van Nistelrooy taking charge on an interim basis. Prior to a Europa League match against PAOK on 7 November, a clip emerged on social media of a fan verbally abusing Garnacho while signing autographs. Three days later, in Van Nistelrooy's final match as interim, he scored United's third goal in their 3–0 win over Leicester City. He did not celebrate the goal as, according to United captain Bruno Fernandes, he felt he had "lost faith" from some supporters. New head coach Ruben Amorim dropped Garnacho alongside Marcus Rashford from the squad completely for the Manchester derby on 15 December, which United won 2–1.

=== Chelsea ===
On 30 August 2025, Garnacho signed for fellow Premier League club Chelsea for a reported fee of £40m. Garnacho made his debut for Chelsea in a 2–2 draw with Brentford on 13 September, coming on as a substitute for João Pedro in the 79th minute. He scored his first goal for the club in a 2–1 loss to Sunderland on 25 October.

==== Loan to Aston Villa ====
On 23 July 2026, Garnacho signed for fellow Premier League club Aston Villa on a season-long loan, with an obligation to buy if certain undisclosed conditions were met.

== International career ==
Garnacho was eligible to play for his country of birth, Spain, and Argentina, as his mother is Argentine. He made three appearances for the Spain under-18 team in 2021.

On 7 March 2022, Garnacho was called up to the senior Argentina team as part of an initial 44-man squad for their two World Cup qualifiers that month. He made it to the final 33-man squad for the fixtures, but did not make an appearance in either game.

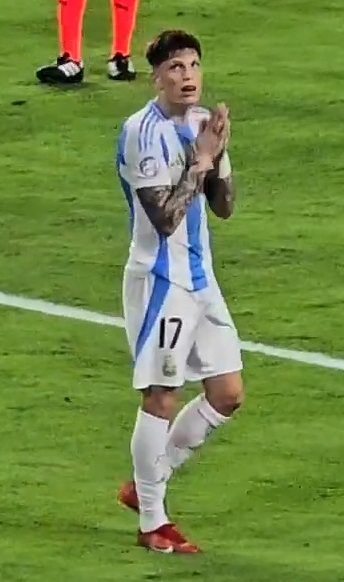
Garnacho with Argentina at the 2024 Copa América

Garnacho made his debut for the Argentina under-20 side on 26 March, when he started in a friendly match against the United States. He scored four goals in four appearances for the under-20 team at the 2022 Maurice Revello Tournament winning the Revelation Player and Goal of the Tournament awards.

In March 2023, he was called up once again to the senior Argentina team for two friendly matches against Panama and Curaçao, but had to withdraw from the squad after suffering an ankle injury. He made his debut for the senior team on 15 June, during a friendly against Australia at Workers' Stadium, coming on as a substitute for Nicolás González during the second half of the game.

In June 2024, Garnacho was included in Lionel Scaloni's final 26-man Argentina squad for the 2024 Copa América. He appeared once in a 2–0 group stage win over Peru as Argentina went on to win the tournament.

== Style of play ==
An energetic forward, Garnacho has been praised for his speed and dribbling abilities, as well as his ability to create chances and get into the box. He has frequently been deployed as a winger on either the left or right flank. United coach Mike Phelan described him as "everything that Manchester United is about" and "an intelligent player who understands his role in the team".

Garnacho's style of play has been heavily influenced by that of former United teammate Cristiano Ronaldo, whom he idolises. He frequently performs Ronaldo's iconic goal celebrations when scoring goals himself.

== Personal life ==
Garnacho was born in Madrid to a Spanish father, Alex Garnacho, and an Argentine mother, Patricia Ferreyra Fernández. He has a younger brother named Roberto. His father Alex is closely associated with management firm, Leader Sports Management, who currently represent Garnacho.

Garnacho and his ex-girlfriend, Eva, have a son who was born on 4 October 2023.

== Career statistics ==
=== Club ===
As of match played 31 October 2026

Appearances and goals by club, season and competition
Club	Season	League			FA Cup		EFL Cup		Europe		Other		Total	
Club	Season	Division	Apps	Goals	Apps	Goals	Apps	Goals	Apps	Goals	Apps	Goals	Apps	Goals
Manchester United U21	2021–22	—			—		—		—		1 (Note: Appearance(s) in EFL Trophy)	0	1	0
Manchester United U21	2022–23	—			—		—		—		2	1	2	1
Manchester United U21	Total		—		—		—		—		3	1	3	1
Manchester United	2021–22	Premier League	2	0	0	0	0	0	0	0	—		2	0
Manchester United	2022–23	Premier League	19	3	4	1	5	0	6 (Note: Appearances in UEFA Europa League)	1	—		34	5
Manchester United	2023–24	Premier League	36	7	6	1	2	1	6 (Note: Appearances in UEFA Champions League)	1	—		50	10
Manchester United	2024–25	Premier League	36	6	3	0	3	3	15	1	1 (Note: Appearance in FA Community Shield)	1	58	11
Manchester United	Total		93	16	13	2	10	4	27	3	1	1	144	26
Chelsea	2025–26	Premier League	24	1	6	2	4	4	9	1	—		43	8
Aston Villa (loan)	2026–27	Premier League	4	0	0	0	1	0	2	0	0	0	7	0
Career total			122	17	18	4	15	8	38	4	4	2	197	35

=== International ===
As of match played 14 November 2024

Appearances and goals by national team and year
National team	Year	Apps	Goals
Argentina	2023	3	0
Argentina	2024	5	0
Total		8	0

== Honours ==
Manchester United U18

- FA Youth Cup: 2021–22

Manchester United

- FA Cup: 2023–24; runner-up: 2022–23
- EFL Cup: 2022–23
- UEFA Europa League runner-up: 2024–25

Chelsea

- FA Cup runner-up: 2025–26

Argentina

- Copa América: 2024

Individual

- Jimmy Murphy Young Player of the Year: 2021–22
- Maurice Revello Tournament Revelation Player: 2022
- Maurice Revello Tournament Best XI: 2022
- Maurice Revello Tournament Goal of the Tournament: 2022
- IFFHS Men's World Youth (U20) Team: 2023
- Awards for goal vs. Everton (26 November 2023)
  - FIFA Puskás Award: 2024
  - Premier League Goal of the Season: 2023–24
  - Premier League Goal of the Month: November 2023
  - BBC Goal of the Season: 2023–24
  - Manchester United Goal of the Season: 2023–24
