= 2024 FA Cup final =

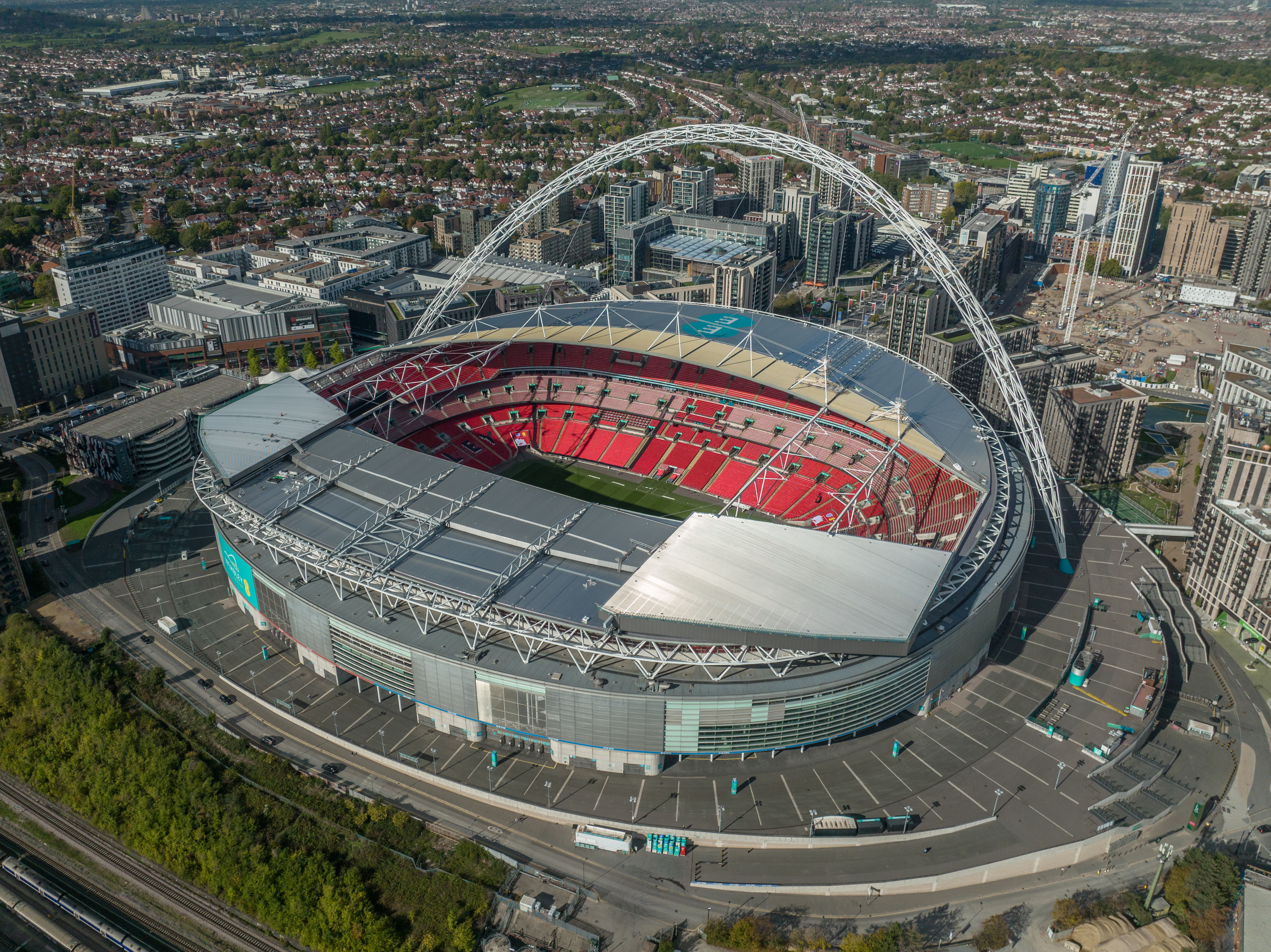
- The match took place at Wembley Stadium
- Event: 2023–24 FA Cup
Manchester City	Manchester United
1	2
- Date: 25 May 2024
- Venue: Wembley Stadium, London
- Man of the Match: Kobbie Mainoo (Manchester United)
- Referee: Andrew Madley (West Yorkshire)
- Attendance: 84,814
- Weather: Sunny

The 2024 FA Cup final was a football match played at Wembley Stadium in London, England, on 25 May 2024 to determine the winners of the 2023–24 FA Cup, Manchester United. It was the 143rd final of English football's primary cup competition in the Football Association Challenge Cup.

The final was contested between holders Manchester City and local rivals Manchester United. The match was a repeat of the previous final, which City won 2–1. It was the second time the two sides have met in the final, and was the first to feature the same teams in consecutive seasons since 1885.

Manchester United won the match for their 13th FA Cup title, avenging their defeat by the same scoreline in the previous season. As winners, Manchester United qualified for the league phase of the 2024–25 UEFA Europa League. They also qualified for the 2024 FA Community Shield, where they faced City as the league champions. As their women's team won the 2024 Women's FA Cup final, Manchester United became the fifth club, and the first since City in 2019, to win both the men's and women's FA Cup in the same season.

== Route to the final ==
=== Manchester City ===
Manchester City's route to the final
Round	Opposition	Score
3rd	Huddersfield Town (H)	5–0
4th	Tottenham Hotspur (A)	1–0
5th	Luton Town (A)	6–2
QF	Newcastle United (H)	2–0
SF	Chelsea (N)	1–0
Key: (H) = Home venue; (A) = Away venue; (N) = Neutral venue

Manchester City entered the tournament in the third round, as a Premier League team. They began with a 5–0 home victory over Huddersfield Town at the Etihad Stadium with two goals for City from Phil Foden, one from Julián Álvarez, an own goal from Ben Jackson and Jérémy Doku. They then defeated Tottenham Hotspur away in the fourth round in a 1–0 victory with a sole goal for City from Nathan Aké. In the fifth round, they beat Luton Town 6–2 away at Kenilworth Road with five goals from Erling Haaland and one from Mateo Kovačić and two goals for Luton from Jordan Clark.

In the quarter-final match, Manchester City hosted Newcastle United at the Etihad Stadium where they came out 2–0 winners in the end which put them through to the semi-finals with two goals for City from Bernardo Silva. In the semi-final match, held at the neutral venue of Wembley Stadium, Manchester City defeated Chelsea in a 1–0 victory to qualify for a second consecutive FA Cup final with the sole goal for City from Silva. This was the third time that City played in consecutive FA Cup finals, having previously done so in the 1933 and 1934 as well as 1955 and 1956 finals.

=== Manchester United ===
Manchester United's route to the final
Round	Opposition	Score
3rd	Wigan Athletic (A)	2–0
4th	Newport County (A)	4–2
5th	Nottingham Forest (A)	1–0
QF	Liverpool (H)	4–3 (a.e.t.)
SF	Coventry City (N)	3–3 (a.e.t.) (4–2 p)
Key: (H) = Home venue; (A) = Away venue; (N) = Neutral venue

As a Premier League team, Manchester United also entered the tournament in the third round. They began their campaign with a 2–0 away win over League One side Wigan Athletic with goals from Diogo Dalot and a penalty from Bruno Fernandes. before recording a 4–2 away win over League Two side Newport County at Rodney Parade. Fernandes scored the opener, before Kobbie Mainoo scored his first goal for United. Newport then managed to bring the tie level with goals from Bryn Morris and Will Evans, but goals from Antony and Rasmus Højlund secured United's passage to the next round. In the fifth round, United travelled to the City Ground and defeated Nottingham Forest 1–0, with Casemiro heading a late winner.

In the quarter-finals, United faced rivals Liverpool at Old Trafford; this was only time in the FA Cup campaign that they were drawn at home. Scott McTominay gave United the lead within 10 minutes, before Alexis Mac Allister and Mohamed Salah scored within minutes to Liverpool a 2–1 lead going into half-time. United looked like they were going out of the FA Cup at the hands of their rivals at home for the first time in over 100 years, but Antony scored a late-equaliser to send the match to extra time. Before the interval, Harvey Elliott gave Liverpool the lead again, but Marcus Rashford made it 3–3. In the final minutes of extra time, Amad Diallo scored the winning goal. Amad was given a yellow second card and sent off for taking his shirt off in celebration, having picked up a yellow card earlier in the match.

In the semi-final match, also held at Wembley, United faced Coventry City, who were the last side not from the top-flight still in the competition. Scott McTominay, Harry Maguire and Bruno Fernandes gave United a comfortable 3–0 lead, which they squandered, with goals from Ellis Simms, Callum O'Hare, and a stoppage-time penalty from Haji Wright which sent the match into extra time. In the final minute of extra time, Victor Torp looked to have completed a miraculous comeback and sent Coventry to the final, but the goal was ruled out by VAR in a moment of controversy. In the penalty shootout, United defeated Coventry 4–2, with Højlund scoring the winning penalty to set up a Manchester derby final for a second successive season. This was the sixth time that United had played in two successive FA Cup finals and the first time since 2004 and 2005.

== Pre-match ==
The Football Association confirmed that the 2024 final would begin at 15:00, the same time as the previous FA Cup final did, as agreed by the Metropolitan Police.

Prior to the match, considerable attention was focused on the future of Manchester United manager Erik ten Hag, as his side finished 8th in the Premier League, the club's lowest position since its formation in 1992. Reports indicated that the club had decided to sack him regardless of the final result.

Manchester City were considered as heavy favourites to win the match by the English media; having clinched a record-breaking fourth successive Premier League title the previous week, a win would make them the first team to win a league and cup double in successive seasons and would also make them the first team to retain the FA Cup since Arsenal in 2015. City had beaten United in both league fixtures between them, winning 3–0 at Old Trafford and 3–1 at the Etihad Stadium. Meanwhile, a win for United would secure European football, having failed to qualify due to their league position.

=== Broadcasting ===
The final was shown live on BBC One, BBC iPlayer, ITV1, ITVX, UTV and STV. Live text commentary was available on the BBC Sport website and app. The BBC coverage was led by Gary Lineker alongside Wayne Rooney and Micah Richards, with the match commentary provided by Guy Mowbray and Alan Shearer. The ITV coverage was led by Mark Pougatch, who was joined by Karen Carney, Roy Keane and Ian Wright; their commentary team consisted of Sam Matterface, Lee Dixon and Ally McCoist, with Gabriel Clarke providing interviews. National radio commentary was provided by BBC Radio 5 Live and Talksport, while BBC Radio Manchester covered the match for local radio.

=== Match officials ===
The match officials were confirmed by the FA on 8 May 2024 with Andrew Madley (West Riding County football association) acting as the referee who previously refereed FA Trophy finals and FA Vase finals in his career. He was joined by assistant referees Harry Lennard (Sussex County football association) and Nick Hopton (Derbyshire County football association) with the fourth official being Simon Hooper (Wiltshire football association) and the reserve assistant referee was Tim Wood (Gloucestershire County football association). The video assistant referee was Michael Oliver (Durham County football association), the support VAR was Peter Bankes (Liverpool County football association) and the assistant VAR was Stuart Burt (Northamptonshire football association).

== Match ==
=== Summary ===
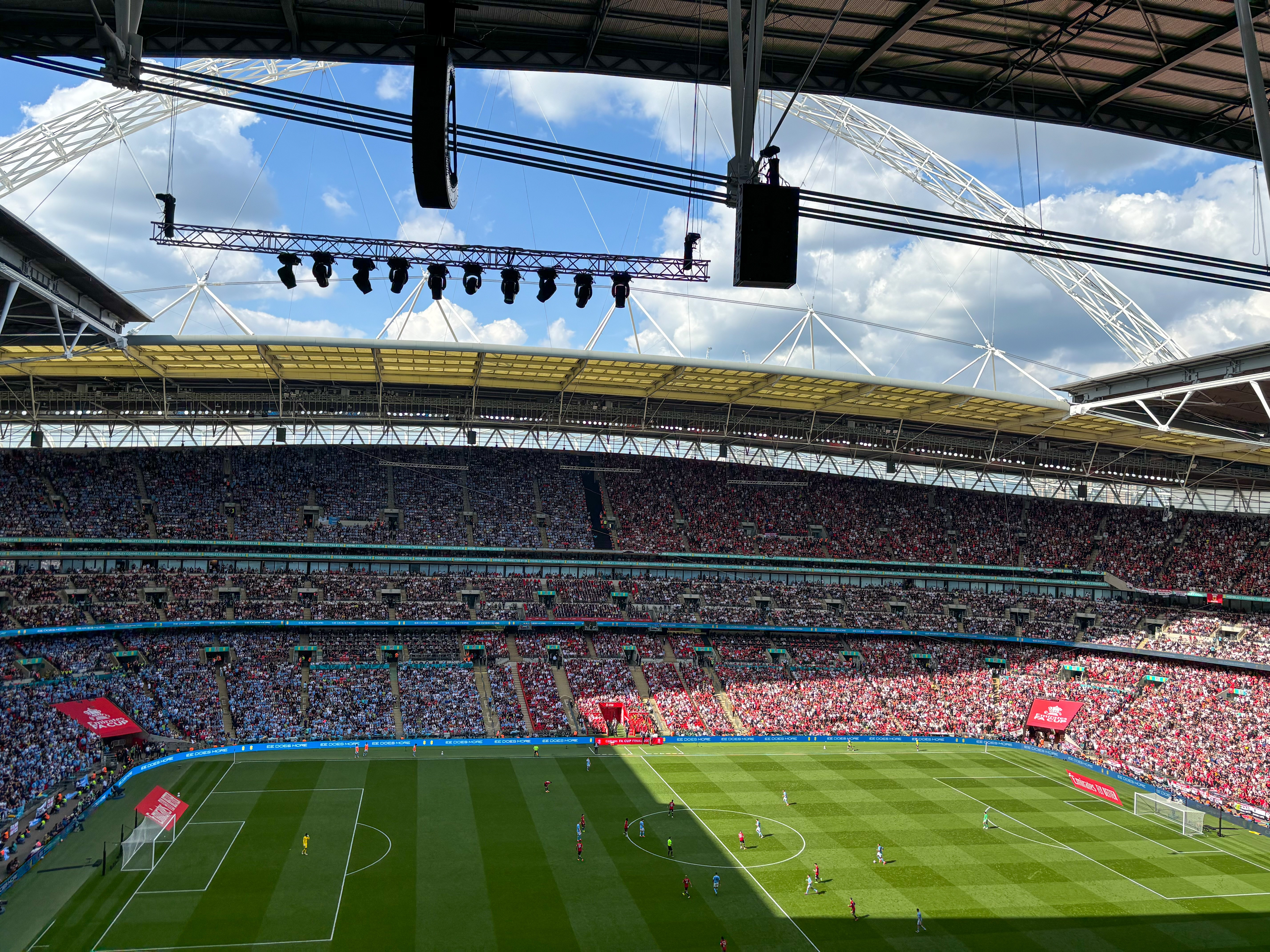
Wembley Stadium during the 2024 FA Cup final between Manchester City and Manchester United.

The match kicked off at 15:00 in front of 84,814 fans. Marcus Rashford was through on goal immediately, but Kyle Walker managed to beat the United forward to the ball. Manchester City then attacked, and Lisandro Martínez made contact with Erling Haaland in the penalty area. City appealed for a penalty, but the appeal was dismissed by the referee. Six minutes later, Bruno Fernandes found Alejandro Garnacho on the right-hand side of the penalty area, before his shot was saved comfortably by Stefan Ortega. In the 30th minute, Garnacho opened the scoring for United after a mistake at the back as Joško Gvardiol looked to head a deep pass from Diogo Dalot back to Ortega, who had come off his line too far, which enabled the United forward to pass it into an empty net. United had the ball in the back of the net again as Garnacho teed up Rashford, who guided the ball at the back post, but it did not count and the assistant referee had his flag up. In the 39th minute, Rashford played a ball over the top to Garnacho on the right-hand side, who picked out Fernandes in the centre, and the United captain played a first-time pass to Kobbie Mainoo who burst into the penalty area and scored to double United's lead.

In the 55th minute, substitute Jérémy Doku played a pass into the penalty area which fell to Haaland, who struck the ball off the crossbar. City continued their pressure, with Walker's effort from outside the penalty area being saved by André Onana. City came close again, as substitute Julián Álvarez scuffed his effort wide after a one-on-one against Onana. With three minutes to play, Doku received the ball on the left-hand side and shifted it onto his right before shooting towards the bottom corner from just outside the penalty area into the bottom left-hand corner of the net to pull one back. However, United held on after seven minutes of stoppage time and the match ended 2–1 in their favour.

=== Details ===
25 May 2024
15:00 BST

Manchester City	1–2	Manchester United
Doku 87'	Report	Garnacho 30'; Mainoo 39'

Wembley Stadium, London
Attendance: 84,814
Referee: Andrew Madley (West Yorkshire)

Manchester City	Manchester United

GK	18	(Germany) Stefan Ortega
RB	2	(England) Kyle Walker (c)
CB	5	(England) John Stones
CB	6	(Netherlands) Nathan Aké		(substituted off) 46'
LB	24	(Croatia) Joško Gvardiol
CM	16	(Spain) Rodri
CM	8	(Croatia) Mateo Kovačić		(substituted off) 46'
RW	20	(Portugal) Bernardo Silva
AM	17	(Belgium) Kevin De Bruyne		(substituted off) 56'
LW	47	(England) Phil Foden
CF	9	(Norway) Erling Haaland
Substitutes:
GK	33	(England) Scott Carson
DF	3	(Portugal) Rúben Dias
DF	25	(Switzerland) Manuel Akanji		(substituted on) 46'
DF	82	(England) Rico Lewis
MF	10	(England) Jack Grealish
MF	11	(Belgium) Jérémy Doku		(substituted on) 46'
MF	27	(Portugal) Matheus Nunes
MF	52	(Norway) Oscar Bobb
FW	19	(Argentina) Julián Álvarez	(yellow card) 90+7'	(substituted on) 56'
Other disciplinary actions:
FS	(Spain) Lorenzo Buenaventura		(yellow card) 90'
Manager:
(Spain) Pep Guardiola

GK	24	(Cameroon) André Onana
RB	29	(England) Aaron Wan-Bissaka
CB	19	(France) Raphaël Varane
CB	6	(Argentina) Lisandro Martínez		(substituted off) 73'
LB	20	(Portugal) Diogo Dalot
DM	37	(England) Kobbie Mainoo	(yellow card) 45'
DM	4	(Morocco) Sofyan Amrabat
RW	17	(Argentina) Alejandro Garnacho		(substituted off) 90+3'
LW	10	(England) Marcus Rashford		(substituted off) 74'
CF	8	(Portugal) Bruno Fernandes (c)
CF	39	(Scotland) Scott McTominay	(yellow card) 90+5'	(substituted off) 90+3'
Substitutes:
GK	1	(Turkey) Altay Bayındır
DF	2	(Sweden) Victor Lindelöf		(substituted on) 90+3'
DF	35	(Northern Ireland) Jonny Evans		(substituted on) 73'
DF	53	(Democratic Republic of the Congo) Willy Kambwala
MF	7	(England) Mason Mount		(substituted on) 90+3'
MF	14	(Denmark) Christian Eriksen
MF	16	(Ivory Coast) Amad Diallo
FW	11	(Denmark) Rasmus Højlund		(substituted on) 74'
FW	21	(Brazil) Antony
Manager:
(Netherlands) Erik ten Hag

Man of the Match:
Kobbie Mainoo (Manchester United)

Assistant referees:
Harry Lennard (Sussex)
Nick Hopton (Derbyshire)
Fourth official:
Simon Hooper (Wiltshire)
Reserve assistant referee:
Tim Wood (Gloucestershire)
Video assistant referee:
Michael Oliver (Durham)
Assistant video assistant referee:
Stuart Burt (Northamptonshire)
Support video assistant referee:
Peter Bankes (Liverpool)

Match rules

- 90 minutes
- 30 minutes of extra time if necessary
- Penalty shoot-out if scores still level
- Nine named substitutes
- Maximum of five substitutions, with a sixth allowed in extra time (Note: Each team was given only three opportunities to make substitutions, with a fourth opportunity in extra time, excluding substitutions made at half-time, before the start of extra time and at half-time in extra time.)

== Post-match ==
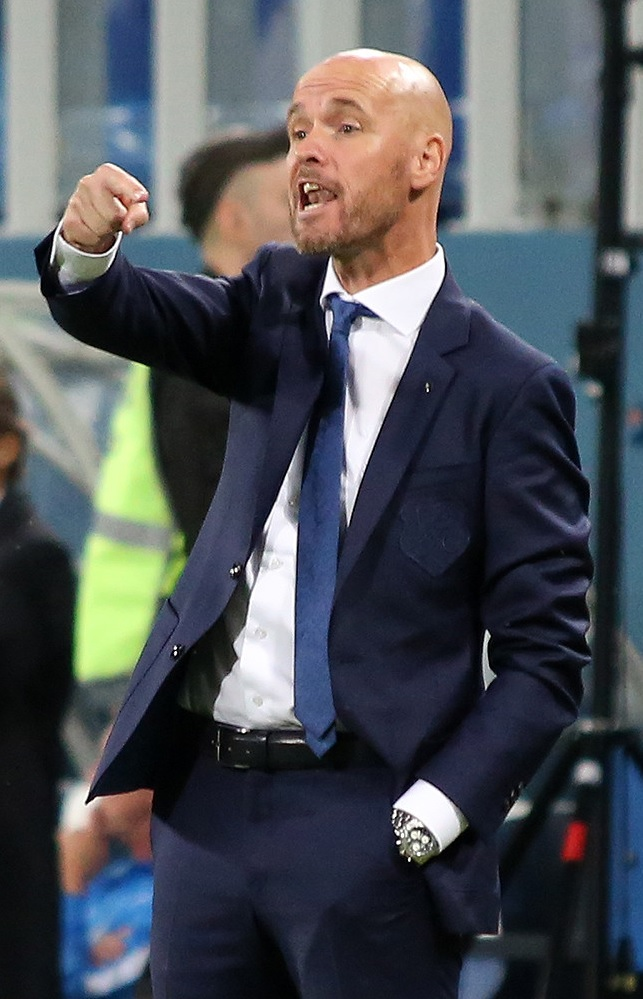
Erik ten Hag became the first Manchester United manager to win trophies in successive seasons since Alex Ferguson's retirement, who last achieved that feat in 2011.

After the match, Erik ten Hag was questioned about his future, to which he replied: "I don't think about this. I'm in a project and we are exactly where we want to be." He also addressed criticism of him and his team this season: “We didn’t have the players. We (he and the critics) have seen the same things. There was not always good football, definitely not, but we had to make, all the time, compromises. Then you can’t play the football you want to play." Pundit and former United midfielder Roy Keane suggested: "The manager has done his job today. Beating Man City in an FA Cup final is an extra bonus. Fingers crossed they support the manager." Following weeks of speculation, reports emerged that Ten Hag would remain at United and that he was in talks with the club to sign a new deal. On 4 July, United announced that they had extended his contract until the 2025–26 season. However, three months later, on 28 October, Ten Hag was sacked after a 2–1 defeat to West Ham United saw the club fall to 14th after nine games.

With his team's victory, Ten Hag became the first manager to beat Pep Guardiola's Manchester City in a major domestic cup final. Having finished eighth in the 2023–24 Premier League, United also became the lowest ranked team to win the FA Cup since Arsenal under Mikel Arteta in 2019–20, when they also finished eighth. United goalscorer and man of the match Kobbie Mainoo praised the togetherness at the end of a tough season, adding his goal was "an amazing moment". He and teammate Alejandro Garnacho became the first teenagers to score in an FA Cup final since Cristiano Ronaldo for United in 2004. This was also City midfielder Rodri's first club defeat since February 2023 against Tottenham Hotspur, ending his 74-game unbeaten streak across all competitions. City manager Guardiola commented that his game plan was not good: "The players know the reason why. Tactically it wasn't good. You plan for a game and different positions, but it didn't work."

As winners, United qualified for the 2024–25 UEFA Europa League league phase and the 2024 FA Community Shield, where they faced City as the league champions. United earned £2 million in prize money, runners-up City earned £1 million.
