= Kobbie Mainoo =

English footballer (born 2005)

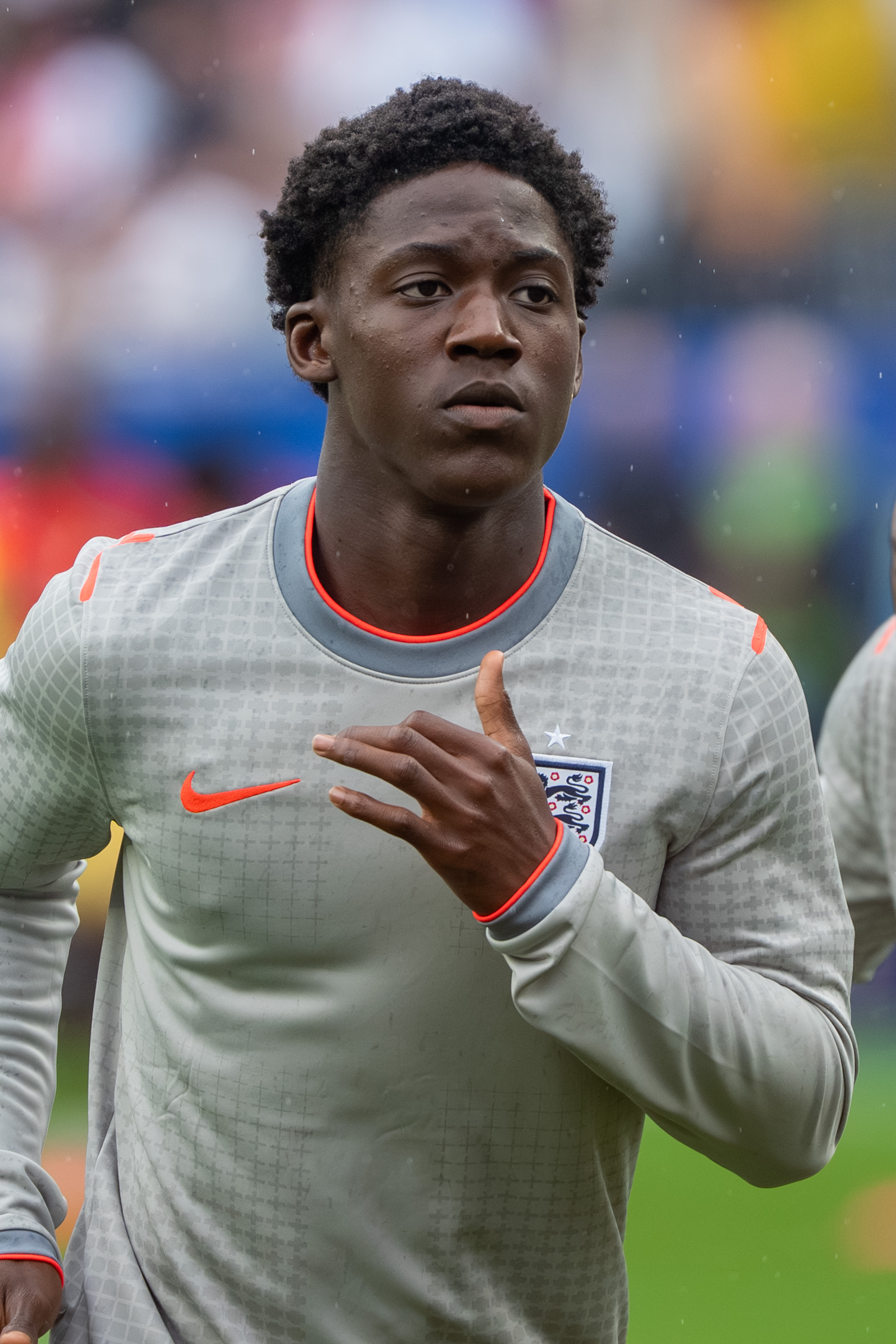
- Mainoo with England in 2026

Personal information
- Full name: Kobbie Boateng Mainoo
- Date of birth: 19 April 2005 (age 21)
- Place of birth: Stockport, Greater Manchester, England
- Height: 6 ft 0 in (1.84 m)
- Position: Midfielder

Team information
- Current team: Manchester United
- Number: 37

Youth career
- Cheadle & Gatley
- Failsworth Dynamos
- –2022: Manchester United

Senior career*
| Years | Team | Apps | (Gls) |
| 2022– | Manchester United | 87 | (4) |

International career^{‡}
| 2021–2022 | England U17 | 5 | (1) |
| 2022 | England U18 | 2 | (0) |
| 2023 | England U19 | 6 | (0) |
| 2024– | England | 14 | (0) |
Medal record
Representing England
FIFA World Cup
| Third place | 2026 Canada–Mexico–US |
UEFA European Championship
| Runner-up | 2024 Germany |
- * Club domestic league appearances and goals as of 20:43, 22 November 2026 (UTC) ‡ National team caps and goals as of 23:11, 10 June 2026 (UTC)

Kobbie Boateng Mainoo (/ˈkɒbi ˈmeɪnuː/; born 19 April 2005) is an English professional footballer who plays as a midfielder for Premier League club Manchester United and the England national team. He is known for his dribbling and composure.

Mainoo is a graduate of Manchester United's youth system and won the Jimmy Murphy Young Player of the Year award in 2023. He made his first-team debut in an EFL Cup match in January 2023, and has gone on to make more than 100 appearances for the club.

Mainoo played youth international football for England from under-17 level, before making his senior international debut at the age of 18 in March 2024. He has earned more than ten caps since then. He was included in the England squad for UEFA Euro 2024 and the 2026 FIFA World Cup.

== Early life ==
Kobbie Boateng Mainoo was born on 19 April 2005 in Stockport, Greater Manchester in England, to parents from Ghana. His older brother (Jordan Mainoo-Hames) appeared as a contestant on the fifth series of Love Island. He was raised in Cheadle Hulme, a suburb of Stockport.

== Club career ==
=== Early career ===
Mainoo started his youth career at Cheadle & Gatley Junior Football Club. He then joined Failsworth Dynamos, where he played as a forward. He was scouted for Manchester United at the age of six, signed up at the age of seven, and joined the academy at the age of nine. Mainoo studied at Ashton-on-Mersey School.

=== Manchester United ===
==== 2022–2023 ====
Mainoo signed his first professional contract with Manchester United in May 2022. His performances earned him a call-up to the first-team squad for training in October.

Mainoo was named on the bench for the first time on 16 October 2022, for a Premier League match against Newcastle United, followed by making his senior debut on 10 January 2023, starting in a 3–0 home win over Charlton Athletic in the quarter-final of the EFL Cup. He continued to be part of the squad in both the semi-final legs and secured his first senior trophy, as United went along to win the final against Newcastle United. He made his league debut on 19 February by coming on as a substitute in a 3–0 home win against Leicester City in the Premier League.

==== 2023–2024 ====
Mainoo travelled with the Manchester United squad on their 2023–24 pre-season tour in the United States. However, he picked up an injury which kept him out for the start of the upcoming season. Returning from injury, Mainoo made his first league start for Manchester United on 26 November 2023, in a 3–0 Premier League victory away to Everton, in which he was named man of the match. On 29 November, he made his UEFA Champions League debut, coming off the bench in a group stage 3–3 away draw against Galatasaray.

On 28 January 2024, Mainoo scored his first goal for Manchester United in a 4–2 win away to Newport County in the FA Cup fourth round. A few days later, on 1 February, he scored his first Premier League goal, a stoppage time winner in a 4–3 away victory over Wolverhampton Wanderers. The goal was later awarded Premier League Goal of the Month for February 2024. On 7 April, he netted his first professional goal at Old Trafford in a 2–2 draw with rivals Liverpool in the Premier League.

In the FA Cup final, Mainoo scored the eventual winning goal in a 2–1 victory over local rivals Manchester City and was awarded Man of the Match. He became the first English teenager to score in a final since Steve MacKenzie in 1981 and the youngest since John Sissons in 1964. His performances for the season were widely praised, with him being nominated for the Premier League Young Player of the Season award.

==== 2024–present ====
On 17 October 2024, Manchester United confirmed that Mainoo would be out for a few weeks following a muscle injury he picked up during a 0–0 away to Aston Villa on 6 October. He made his return on 1 December 2024, starting in a 4–0 win against Everton in new head coach Ruben Amorim's first Premier League match at Old Trafford.

On 30 January 2025, Mainoo scored his first goal of the season and his first in Europe in a 2–0 away win over FCSB. He also got an assist and was named man of the match.

On 17 April 2025, following a return from injury, Mainoo scored a last-minute extra-time equaliser in the second-leg of a Europa League tie against Olympique Lyon. United scored only a minute later with a header from Harry Maguire to win 5–4, as they became the first team to score two goals in the 120th minute of a European match. On 30 April 2026, he extended his contract with the club until 2031. A few days later, on 3 May, he netted the winner in a 3–2 victory over Liverpool, securing his club's place in the Champions League, and completing the first league double over their rivals since the 2015–16 season.

== International career ==
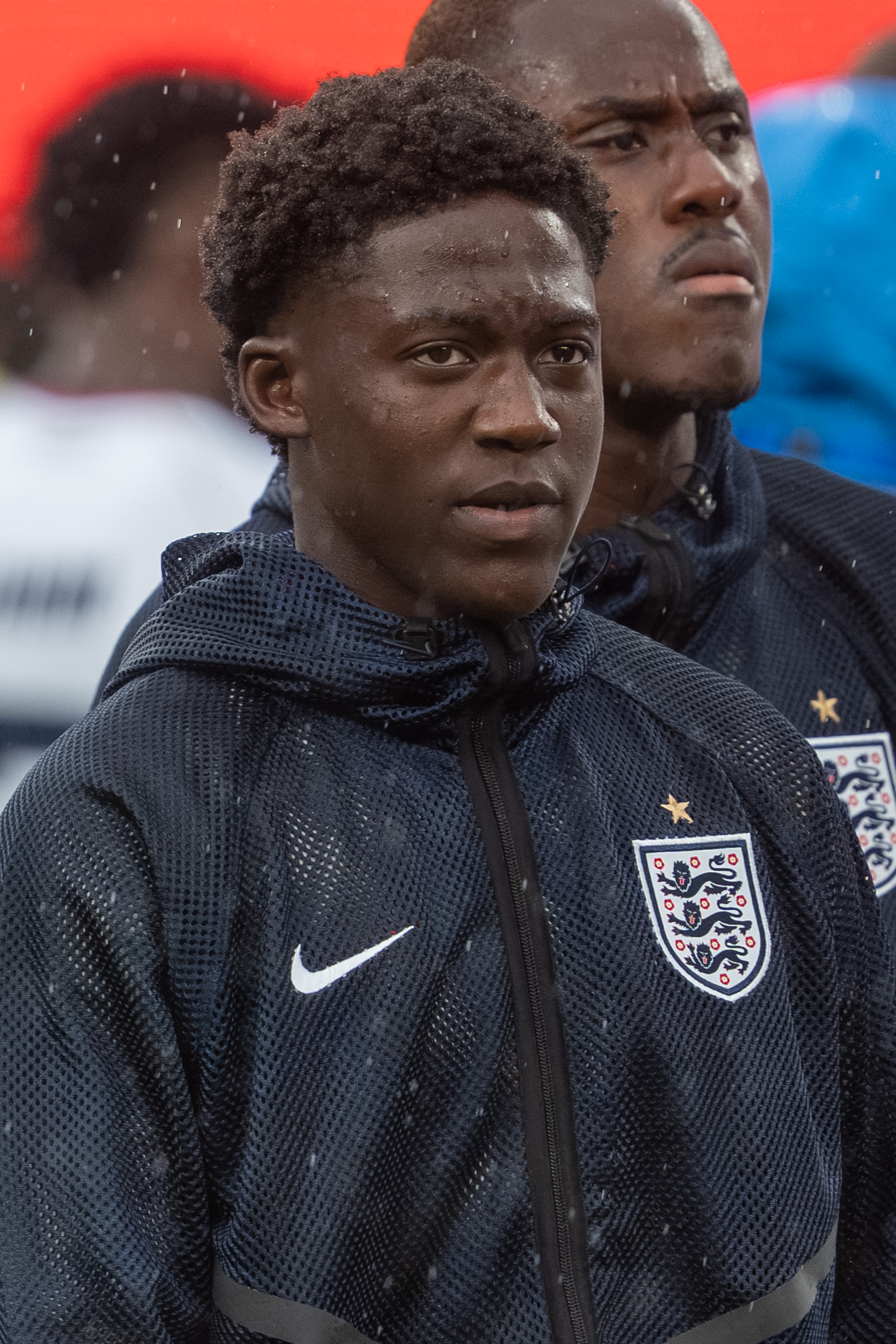
Mainoo with England at the 2026 FIFA World Cup

Mainoo has represented England at under-17, under-18, and under-19 youth levels, and at the senior level.

In March 2024, Mainoo was called up to the senior squad for the first time for England's friendlies against Brazil and Belgium, after previously being drafted for the under-21s. Aged 18, he made his debut on 23 March as a substitute for Conor Gallagher in a 1–0 defeat to Brazil at Wembley Stadium. He made his first England start in a 2–2 draw against Belgium, in which he was named man of the match.

On 6 June, Mainoo was named in England's 26-man squad for UEFA Euro 2024. He made his competitive debut in the team's opening match, playing the last four minutes as a substitute for Jude Bellingham in a 1–0 win over Serbia. On 25 June, he played the second half against Slovenia in a 0–0 draw in the team's final group stage match, replacing Conor Gallagher at half time. In the round of 16 match against Slovakia, he became the third-youngest player to start for England at a knockout stage of a major tournament in a 2–1 win. On 10 July, in a 2–1 win in the semi-finals against Netherlands, he became the youngest England player to play a semi-final of a major tournament. Four days later, he started in the final, which ended in a 2–1 defeat to Spain.

On 21 May 2026, Mainoo was named in England's 26-man squad for the 2026 FIFA World Cup. However, he would go on to be the only outfield player in the squad not to feature during the tournament, missing England's bronze medal victory against France due to illness.

== Style of play ==
Mainoo is primarily a central midfielder who is also capable of playing as a defensive midfielder and attacking midfielder. An intelligent and composed player, he excels in driving the ball forward, using his dribbling skills to navigate through tight spaces and evade defenders. Former Manchester United defender Rio Ferdinand has compared his style of play to that of Clarence Seedorf. Then-United manager Erik ten Hag praised his ability to "quickly adapt to high levels", as well as his willingness to progress and develop as a player. Pundit and former United midfielder Paul Scholes praised him, saying that "[I] just love the way he receives the ball, the calmness, the awareness of what's around him, and of course big goals in big games."

== Career statistics ==
=== Club ===
As of match played 22 November 2026

Appearances and goals by club, season and competition
| Club | Season | League | | | FA Cup | | EFL Cup | | Europe | | Other | | Total | |
| Club | Season | Division | Apps | Goals | Apps | Goals | Apps | Goals | Apps | Goals | Apps | Goals | Apps | Goals |
|---|---|---|---|---|---|---|---|---|---|---|---|---|---|---|
| Manchester United U21 | 2022–23 | — | | | — | | — | | — | | 3 (Note: Appearance(s) in EFL Trophy) | 0 | 3 | 0 |
| Manchester United U21 | 2023–24 | — | | | — | | — | | — | | 1 | 0 | 1 | 0 |
| Manchester United U21 | Total | | — | | — | | — | | — | | 4 | 0 | 4 | 0 |
| Manchester United | 2022–23 | Premier League | 1 | 0 | 1 | 0 | 1 | 0 | 0 | 0 | — | | 3 | 0 |
| Manchester United | 2023–24 | Premier League | 24 | 3 | 6 | 2 | 0 | 0 | 2 (Note: Appearances in UEFA Champions League) | 0 | — | | 32 | 5 |
| Manchester United | 2024–25 | Premier League | 25 | 0 | 2 | 0 | 1 | 0 | 8 (Note: Appearances in UEFA Europa League) | 2 | 1 (Note: Appearance in FA Community Shield) | 0 | 37 | 2 |
| Manchester United | 2025–26 | Premier League | 28 | 1 | 1 | 0 | 1 | 0 | — | | — | | 30 | 1 |
| Manchester United | 2026–27 | Premier League | 9 | 0 | 0 | 0 | 1 | 0 | 2 | 0 | — | | 12 | 0 |
| Manchester United | Total | | 87 | 4 | 10 | 2 | 4 | 0 | 12 | 2 | 1 | 0 | 114 | 8 |
| Career total | | | 87 | 4 | 10 | 2 | 4 | 0 | 12 | 2 | 5 | 0 | 118 | 8 |

=== International ===
As of match played 10 June 2026

Appearances and goals by national team and year
| National team | Year | Apps | Goals |
|---|---|---|---|
England
| England | 2024 | 10 | 0 |
| England | 2026 | 4 | 0 |
| Total | | 14 | 0 |

== Honours ==
Manchester United U18

- FA Youth Cup: 2021–22

Manchester United

- FA Cup: 2023–24
- UEFA Europa League runner-up: 2024–25

England

- UEFA European Championship runner-up: 2024
- FIFA World Cup third place: 2026

Individual

- Premier League Goal of the Month: February 2024
- Jimmy Murphy Young Player of the Year: 2022–23
