= Marc Jurado =

Spanish footballer

Personal information
- Full name: Marc Jurado Gómez
- Date of birth: 13 April 2004 (age 22)
- Place of birth: Sabadell, Spain
- Height: 1.78 m (5 ft 10 in)
- Position: Right-back

Team information
- Current team: Cartagena
- Number: 2

Youth career
- 2008–2011: Can Rull
- 2011–2020: Barcelona
- 2020–2023: Manchester United

Senior career*
Years	Team	Apps	(Gls)
2022–2023	Manchester United	0	(0)
2023–2025	Espanyol B	62	(3)
2025–	Cartagena	24	(0)

International career^{‡}
2022	Spain U19	1	(0)
2022–2023	Spain U20	2	(0)
- * Club domestic league appearances and goals as of 10 June 2026 ‡ National team caps and goals as of 18 January 2023

Marc Jurado Gómez (born 13 April 2004) is a Spanish footballer who plays as a right-back for Primera Federación club Cartagena.

== Club career ==
=== Early career ===
Born in Sabadell, Barcelona, Catalonia, Jurado started his career at the age of four, with local side Can Rull. He was noticed by a Barcelona scout for his goal-scoring ability. However, Jurado wanted to switch to handball to play as a goalkeeper, as well as stay with Can Rull to be with his friends, and rejected Barcelona's initial advances.

After giving the offer some consideration, Jurado ended his three-year spell with Can Rull and joined Barcelona's youth academy in 2011. Early into his career with Barcelona, he scored one of the quickest goals ever scored by the Spanish club at any level - notching a goal after 5 seconds against Viladecans.

=== Manchester United ===
In May 2020, Jurado began being strongly linked with English Premier League side Manchester United, having rejected the offer of a contract extension at Barcelona. He announced his departure from the Catalan club at the end of June, further fuelling rumours of his move to the Red Devils. Eventually, after a delay in paperwork being finalised, the signing was completed, and Jurado was announced as a Manchester United player in September 2020.

He signed his first professional contract with United in April 2021. Following the injuries to Luke Shaw and Tyrell Malacia, Jurado was named on the bench for the first time on 16 April, ahead of the Premier League match against Nottingham Forest.

=== Espanyol ===
On 1 September 2023, Jurado joined Espanyol on a permanent transfer, being assigned to the B-team in Segunda Federación.

== International career ==
Jurado was called up to the Spain under-17 side on 25 May 2021 for the trainings in May. Jurado was called up to the Spain under-18 side on 15 February 2022 for the friendly match against Denmark.

He made his under-19 debut in 2022, and in the same year was promoted to the under-20 side.

== Style of play ==
A natural right-back, noted for his good awareness, positional sense and pace, Jurado can also operate further up the right flank as a winger.

== Career statistics ==
=== Club ===
As of match played 13 December 2022

Appearances and goals by club, season and competition
Club	Season	League			FA Cup		EFL Cup		Europe		Other		Total	
Club	Season	Division	Apps	Goals	Apps	Goals	Apps	Goals	Apps	Goals	Apps	Goals	Apps	Goals
Manchester United U21	2021–22	—	—		—		—		—		1 (Note: Appearance(s) in the EFL Trophy)	0	1	0
Manchester United U21	2022–23	—	—		—		—		—		5	0	5	0
Manchester United U21	Total		—		—		—		—		6	0	6	0
Career total			0	0	0	0	0	0	0	0	6	0	6	0

== Honours ==
Manchester United U18

- FA Youth Cup: 2021–22
