= 2022–23 Manchester United F.C. season =

English football club season

Manchester United
2022–23 season
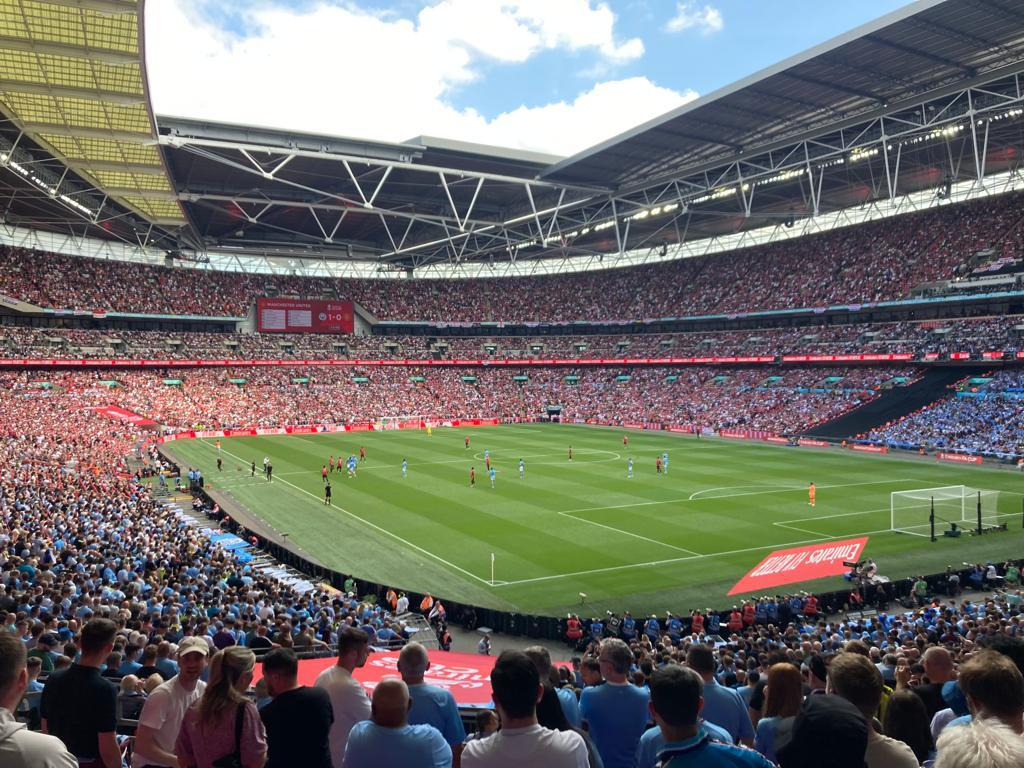
- Manchester United at Wembley against Manchester City in the 2023 FA Cup final
- Co-chairman: Joel and Avram Glazer
- Manager: Erik ten Hag
- Stadium: Old Trafford
- Premier League: 3rd
- FA Cup: Runners-up
- EFL Cup: Winners
- UEFA Europa League: Quarter-finals
- Top goalscorer: League: Marcus Rashford (17); All: Marcus Rashford (30)
- Highest home attendance: 74,345 (v. Charlton Athletic, 10 January 2023)
- Lowest home attendance: 62,062 (v. Burnley, 21 December 2022)
- Average home league attendance: 73,571
Home colours	Away colours	Third colours

The 2022–23 season was Manchester United's 31st season in the Premier League and their 48th consecutive season in the top flight of English football. This was the club's first season under the management of Erik ten Hag. They won the EFL Cup with a 2–0 victory over Newcastle United in the final, the club's first competitive trophy since winning the UEFA Europa League in 2017. They also reached the final of the FA Cup, losing 2–1 to rivals Manchester City.

There was a mid-season break for the 2022 FIFA World Cup in Qatar, with the last match being played on 13 November 2022. The team's first match after the World Cup was in the EFL Cup on 21 December 2022, following the World Cup final on 18 December.

On 22 November 2022, United announced the departure of Cristiano Ronaldo, one year after he rejoined the club from Juventus.

== Pre-season and friendlies ==
United confirmed the first of their tour destinations, travelling to Bangkok, Thailand and Melbourne, Australia to face rivals Liverpool in the Bangkok Century Cup, Melbourne Victory and Crystal Palace. A third friendly in Australia was later added, against Aston Villa. A trip to Norway was also confirmed for a fixture against Atlético Madrid. A home match, Erik ten Hag's first as United manager, was confirmed against Rayo Vallecano for 31 July.

United began the tour with a 4–0 win over Liverpool; goals from Jadon Sancho, Fred and Anthony Martial put them 3–0 up by half-time, before Facundo Pellistri added a fourth less than 15 minutes from the end. The tour resumed in Australia, where United came back from a goal down – scored by Chris Ikonomidis – to beat Melbourne Victory 4–1; goals from Scott McTominay, Martial, Marcus Rashford and an own goal from Victory youngster Edmond Lupancu maintained United's 100% start to pre-season. On 19 July, United led Crystal Palace 3–0 first via Martial, Rashford, and Sancho before a goal from Joel Ward pulled one back for the London club. Four days later, United led Aston Villa 2–0 in the first half via Sancho and a Matty Cash own goal before goals from Leon Bailey and Calum Chambers equalised for the Birmingham club. A week later, United suffered their first defeat in pre-season against Atlético Madrid, following a late goal from João Félix. The next day, United played another Madrid club, Rayo Vallecano. Amad Diallo scored first early in the second half before Álvaro García equalised nine minutes later.

During the break for the 2022 FIFA World Cup, Manchester United had a week-long training camp in Cádiz, Spain, highlighted by a friendly match against Cádiz CF at Nuevo Mirandilla on 7 December. A second friendly was played against Real Betis at the Estadio Benito Villamarín in Seville three days later. United lost both matches, going down 4–2 to Cádiz and 1–0 to Real Betis.

Date	Opponents	H / A	Result F–A	Scorers	Attendance
12 July 2022	Liverpool	N	4–0	Sancho 12', Fred 30', Martial 33', Pellistri 76'	50,248
15 July 2022	Melbourne Victory	N	4–1	McTominay 43', Martial 45+1', Rashford 78', Lupancu 90' (o.g.)	74,157
19 July 2022	Crystal Palace	N	3–1	Martial 17', Rashford 48', Sancho 59'	76,499
23 July 2022	Aston Villa	N	2–2	Sancho 25', Cash 42' (o.g.)	58,228
30 July 2022	Atlético Madrid	N	0–1		26,129
31 July 2022	Rayo Vallecano	H	1–1	Diallo 48'	68,663
7 December 2022	Cádiz	A	2–4	Martial 21' (pen.), Mainoo 48'	14,648
10 December 2022	Real Betis	A	0–1		11,927

== Premier League ==
The 2022–23 Premier League fixtures were released on 16 June 2022.

The league season began with a home loss against Brighton & Hove Albion on 7 August. Pascal Groß scored twice in the first half for Brighton before they conceded an own goal by Alexis Mac Allister in the second to give United their first ever home defeat to Brighton. Named in the starting line-up, Lisandro Martínez and Christian Eriksen made their debuts for United, as did Tyrell Malacia, who came on as a substitute. United then suffered another defeat to Brentford, the first time they had started a league campaign with consecutive losses since the 1992–93 season. Josh Dasilva, Mathias Jensen, Ben Mee and Bryan Mbeumo all scored without reply before the clock had reached 38 minutes. The rest of the game went goalless, but it meant United went bottom of the league table. This was United's seventh straight away defeat in the league, their worst streak since a run of 10 in the 1936–37 season, which ended in relegation from the First Division. That season, United lost both of their meetings with Brentford: 4–0 away on 10 October 1936 and 3–1 on 13 February 1937; those were United's most recent defeats to Brentford prior to this. Erik ten Hag became the first United manager since John Chapman in 1921 to lose his opening two games in charge of the club.

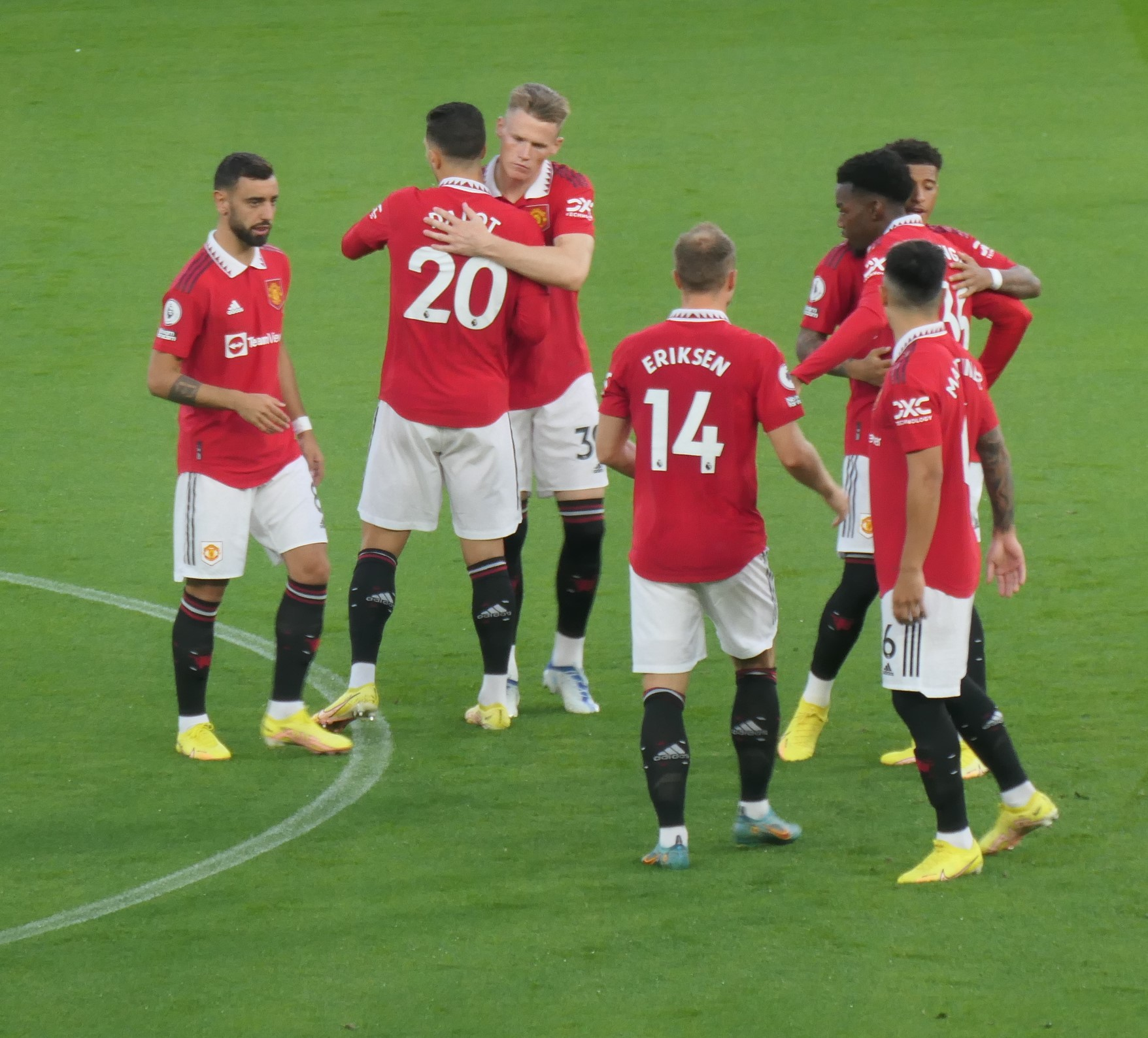
United took their first league victory of the season by beating Liverpool in August 2022

On 22 August, United achieved their first league victory of the season, a 2–1 home win against rivals Liverpool. Jadon Sancho scored 15 minutes into the first half and Marcus Rashford early in the second, before Mohamed Salah scored a consolation goal that made him the fixture's outright top scorer with 10 goals. This was United's first league win against Liverpool since March 2018. In the next match, United visited Southampton on 27 August. Bruno Fernandes scored the game's only goal with a volley as United won their first away match in the league and won back-to-back league matches for the first time since February 2022. Casemiro made his United debut when he came on as a substitute in the 80th minute. On 1 September, United achieved a second away victory as they won 1–0 against Leicester City. Sancho scored the only goal after 23 minutes as United won three league matches in a row for the first time since December 2021. On 4 September, United obtained their fourth consecutive league victory with a 3–1 home win against rivals Arsenal. Antony scored the opening goal 35 minutes into his United debut, before Bukayo Saka equalised at the hour mark. Rashford then scored two goals in order to secure victory against Arsenal, who were on top of the league table, having started the season on a five-match winning streak.

Following the death of Queen Elizabeth II on 8 September, all league matches on the weekend of 10–12 September were postponed. United then announced that their home game against rivals Leeds United, originally scheduled for 18 September, would also be postponed due to a police shortage ahead of the Queen's state funeral.

United's break from league action was further extended by the September international window, which meant their first Premier League match in almost a month saw them face Manchester City away in the derby on 2 October. Erling Haaland and Phil Foden each scored twice for City in the first half to give the hosts a 4–0 lead at the break. Antony scored for United early in the second half, but Haaland and Foden both scored again to complete their hat-tricks before Anthony Martial came on to score two late goals for United. With a total of nine goals, it was the highest-scoring Manchester derby of all time. The next week, United travelled to play Everton. Alex Iwobi opened the scoring after just five minutes, but Everton led only briefly before Antony scored the equaliser, his third consecutive league game scoring. An injury to Martial saw him replaced by Cristiano Ronaldo just before the half-hour mark, who only took 15 minutes to score the winning goal, assisted by Casemiro. It was Ronaldo's first open-play goal of the season and the 700th overall in his club career. On the next match United faced Newcastle United in their first home league game in six weeks. Both teams had plenty of chances but ultimately had to settle for a goalless draw. Three days later, they hosted Tottenham Hotspur. Fred scored his first goal of the season before Fernandes sealed the win.

They visited Chelsea three days later in the last game against a fellow top six side in 2022. Following a foul in the penalty area by Scott McTominay, Jorginho slotted home the penalty three minutes from time, but Casemiro then headed home in the fourth minute of stoppage time – his first United goal – as United extended their unbeaten league record against the West London side to 10 matches, dating back to November 2017. United hosted West Ham United on 30 October. Rashford scored his 100th club goal, which proved to be the sole goal of the game. The match was held 85 years to the start of United's run of including academy graduates in their matchday squads, which by this point already reached 4,163 consecutive matches. A week later United travelled to Aston Villa, in their manager Unai Emery's first Premier League game since his days with Arsenal. A seventh-minute goal from Leon Bailey and a free kick from Lucas Digne four minutes later gave Villa an early two-goal lead, before a shot from Luke Shaw was deflected into his own net by Jacob Ramsey. Four minutes into the second half, Ramsey redeemed himself and made it 3–1. This was United's first loss at Villa Park in all competitions since October 1999, and the first in the league since August 1995. The following Sunday saw United travel to West London to face Fulham for the last Premier League game prior to the World Cup. Eriksen opened the scoring with his first goal for the club with less than 15 minutes played, but as the game passed the hour mark, former United winger Daniel James scored from close range to equalise. Alejandro Garnacho, who was subbed on for Martial 11 minutes later, scored the winning goal in the final minute of added time.

United's first action after the World Cup was a Boxing Day fixture against Nottingham Forest. Following up a corner kick from Eriksen, Rashford scored the opening goal after just 18 minutes, four minutes before setting up for Martial. Fred scored the third goal three minutes from time following a pass from Casemiro to secure the three points. United's final game of the year saw them play Wolverhampton Wanderers away. Rashford, who was benched for disciplinary reasons, scored the game's only goal to put United into the top four.

United started the new year with a home game against Bournemouth. Goals from Casemiro, Shaw and Rashford gave them a 3–0 win and strengthened the club's grip on the top four. Two weeks later, they welcomed Manchester City to Old Trafford for the second derby of the season. Jack Grealish opened the scoring for City on the hour mark, before Fernandes scored an equaliser in the 78th minute; the goal was initially ruled out for an offside against Rashford, but a VAR review deemed Rashford not to have been interfering with play. Rashford then scored the winner four minutes later; it was his eighth goal in his last seven appearances. The win also extended United's winning run to nine in all competitions. Four days later, United travelled to Crystal Palace. Their nine-game winning run was brought to an end after Fernandes' first half goal was cancelled out by a second half stoppage time free-kick from Michael Olise. This game saw Wout Weghorst made his debut for the club. Four days later, United travelled to league leaders Arsenal. Rashford brought United forward before an equaliser by Eddie Nketiah seven minutes later. Saka put Arsenal in front in the 53rd minute, but Lisandro Martínez scored his first United goal to equalise matters. Nketiah then scored the winner at the 90th minute, extended Arsenal's unbeaten league record this season to 13 matches and home record against United to five league matches; United's most recent league win at the Emirates Stadium was on 2 December 2017.

On 4 February, United faced Crystal Palace. A handball from Will Hughes penalised Palace; Fernandes executed the penalty kick smoothly to open an early lead. Rashford then made it 2–0 after a pass from Shaw. After Casemiro received a red card after an altercation with Hughes, Jeffrey Schlupp halved the deficit in the 76th minute. Marcel Sabitzer came on to make his United debut in the closing minutes as they successfully defended the lead. Four days later Leeds came visiting right after the dismissal of their head coach Jesse Marsch, with Michael Skubala as his interim replacement. Within a minute, Wilfried Gnonto scored for them. In the 48th minute, Raphaël Varane scored an own goal from Crysencio Summerville's cut-back to double Leeds' lead. Rashford pulled one back 14 minutes later, before Sancho equalised within eight minutes to earn United a point. United visited Leeds the following Sunday. Rashford broke the deadlock with a header at the 80th minute following a cross from Shaw, before Garnacho sealed the win with a strike assisted by Weghorst. David de Gea made history as he became the first keeper to reach 400 Premier League appearances for Manchester United. In the next match, United faced Leicester at Old Trafford. Rashford scored in the 25th minute, breaking his best tally in a season, and doubled the lead in the 56th minute. Sancho then scored five minutes later to secure a 3–0 win. The scoreline meant that De Gea equalled Peter Schmeichel's club record for most clean sheets.

On 5 March, United visited Anfield in search of a first win there since January 2016. Instead, braces from Cody Gakpo, Darwin Núñez and the fixture's top scorer, Mohamed Salah, as well as a closing goal from Roberto Firmino gave Liverpool a 7–0 win, breaking the record set 128 years earlier for the biggest win in matches between the two teams. This was also United's joint-biggest ever defeat and the heaviest since Wolverhampton Wanderers thrashed them by the same scoreline in 1931. The following Sunday, United faced Southampton at home. The match ended in a goalless draw after a second red card of the season for Casemiro for a challenge on Charly Alcaraz, upgraded from a yellow card after an intervention from the video assistant referee.

After the international break, United travelled to Newcastle. Joe Willock and Callum Wilson scored for the home side without reply. Manchester United failed to win both league meetings against Newcastle for the first time since the 2015–16 season, and with just one point earned from a possible six, this league season was Manchester United's worst against Newcastle since they did the same in 2011–12. In the next match, United welcomed Brentford. A Rashford goal gave United their first league win since February and put them back in the top four. Three days later, they welcomed Everton at home. A goal each from Scott McTominay and Anthony Martial, both scoring in the league for the first time this season, secured the win. Eight days later, United visited Forest for their fourth and final meeting of the season. Antony scored after 32 minutes, before Diogo Dalot scored his first Premier League goal after an assist by Antony. This became the third time that United won four matches against a single opponent in a season, after Sheffield Wednesday in 1993–94 and Chelsea in 2010–11.

United returned to Premier league action 11 days later at the Tottenham Hotspur Stadium. The away side took an early lead through Jadon Sancho before Marcus Rashford scored a second just before half-time. In the second half, Pedro Porro scored for Spurs and Son Heung-min levelled the scores in the 79th minute to end United's five match winning streak against Tottenham Hotspur in the league.

Three days later, United hosted Aston Villa, with Bruno Fernandes scoring the only goal of the game six minutes before half-time after a shot from Marcus Rashford was turned into his path by Villa goalkeeper Emiliano Martínez. It marked the 100th career goal for Fernandes.

United's next match was a rescheduled fixture against Brighton & Hove Albion on the 4th of May. The game was goalless heading into added time, before Brighton were awarded a penalty following a VAR review after Luke Shaw was judged to have handled the ball in the area while defending a corner. The spot kick was converted by Alexis Mac Allister, who had scored an own goal in the reverse fixture earlier in the season. United then travelled to London three days later to face West Ham United. David de Gea let a shot from Said Benrahma slip through his hands in the 27th minute to gift the Hammers a win over United, the first time former manager David Moyes has beaten them in the league.

The following Saturday, United played Wolverhampton Wanderers at home. Anthony Martial scored a first half tap-in from a square pass by Antony, before Alejandro Garnacho marked his return from injury with a stoppage time goal to strengthen United's grip on 4th place in the league. A week later, United travelled to Bournemouth for their final away game of the season. Casemiro scored an acrobatic overhead kick for the only goal of the game and David de Gea's 17th clean sheet of the season confirmed him as the winner of the Premier League Golden Glove award for most clean sheets kept.

Manchester United's penultimate league game was a 4–1 win over Chelsea. Goals from Casemiro and Martial gave United a two-goal lead at half-time, before a penalty from Fernandes and Rashford's 30th goal of the season doubled their lead, although João Félix managed a late consolation strike for the Blues. The victory sealed a top-four finish for United and qualification for the 2023–24 UEFA Champions League group stage. The Red Devils ended their league season with a 2–1 victory at home to Fulham. The away side went ahead in the first half after a header from Kenny Tete, but missed the chance to double their lead after De Gea saved a penalty from Aleksandar Mitrović. United then fought back in the second half with Sancho and Fernandes getting on the scoresheet for a comeback win to ensure they would finish the season in third place.

=== Matches ===
Date	Opponents	H / A	Result F–A	Scorers	Attendance	League position
7 August 2022	Brighton & Hove Albion	H	1–2	Mac Allister 68' (o.g.)	73,711	13th
13 August 2022	Brentford	A	0–4		17,250	20th
22 August 2022	Liverpool	H	2–1	Sancho 16', Rashford 53'	73,594	14th
27 August 2022	Southampton	A	1–0	Fernandes 55'	31,196	7th
1 September 2022	Leicester City	A	1–0	Sancho 23'	32,226	5th
4 September 2022	Arsenal	H	3–1	Antony 35', Rashford (2) 66', 75'	73,431	5th
2 October 2022	Manchester City	A	3–6	Antony 56', Martial (2) 84', 90+1' (pen.)	53,475	6th
9 October 2022	Everton	A	2–1	Antony 15', Ronaldo 44'	39,258	5th
16 October 2022	Newcastle United	H	0–0		73,726	5th
19 October 2022	Tottenham Hotspur	H	2–0	Fred 47', Fernandes 69'	73,677	5th
22 October 2022	Chelsea	A	1–1	Casemiro 90+4'	39,503	5th
30 October 2022	West Ham United	H	1–0	Rashford 38'	73,682	5th
6 November 2022	Aston Villa	A	1–3	Ramsey 45' (o.g.)	42,058	5th
13 November 2022	Fulham	A	2–1	Eriksen 14', Garnacho 90+3'	24,246	5th
27 December 2022	Nottingham Forest	H	3–0	Rashford 19', Martial 22', Fred 87'	73,608	5th
31 December 2022	Wolverhampton Wanderers	A	1–0	Rashford 76'	31,658	4th
3 January 2023	Bournemouth	H	3–0	Casemiro 23', Shaw 49', Rashford 86'	73,322	4th
14 January 2023	Manchester City	H	2–1	Fernandes 78', Rashford 82'	73,546	4th
18 January 2023 (Note: This match, originally scheduled for 11 September 2022, was part of the league-wide postponement of that weekend's matches due to the death of Queen Elizabeth II.)	Crystal Palace	A	1–1	Fernandes 43'	35,853	3rd
22 January 2023	Arsenal	A	2–3	Rashford 17', Martínez 59'	60,325	4th
4 February 2023	Crystal Palace	H	2–1	Fernandes 7' (pen.), Rashford 62'	73,420	3rd
8 February 2023 (Note: This match, originally scheduled for 18 September 2022, was postponed due to a police shortage ahead of the state funeral of Queen Elizabeth II.)	Leeds United	H	2–2	Rashford 62', Sancho 70'	73,456	3rd
12 February 2023	Leeds United	A	2–0	Rashford 80', Garnacho 85'	36,919	3rd
19 February 2023	Leicester City	H	3–0	Rashford (2) 25', 56', Sancho 61'	73,578	3rd
5 March 2023	Liverpool	A	0–7		53,001	3rd
12 March 2023	Southampton	H	0–0		73,439	3rd
2 April 2023	Newcastle United	A	0–2		52,268	4th
5 April 2023 (Note: This match, originally scheduled for 26 February 2023, was rescheduled due to United's involvement in the 2023 EFL Cup final.)	Brentford	H	1–0	Rashford 27'	73,309	4th
8 April 2023	Everton	H	2–0	McTominay 36', Martial 71'	73,509	4th
16 April 2023	Nottingham Forest	A	2–0	Antony 32', Dalot 76'	29,435	3rd
27 April 2023	Tottenham Hotspur	A	2–2	Sancho 7', Rashford 44'	61,586	4th
30 April 2023	Aston Villa	H	1–0	Fernandes 39'	73,592	4th
4 May 2023 (Note: This match, originally scheduled for 19 March 2023, was rescheduled due to both teams' involvement in the FA Cup quarter-finals.)	Brighton & Hove Albion	A	0–1		31,577	4th
7 May 2023	West Ham United	A	0–1		62,477	4th
13 May 2023	Wolverhampton Wanderers	H	2–0	Martial 32', Garnacho 90+4'	73,570	4th
20 May 2023	Bournemouth	A	1–0	Casemiro 9'	10,240	4th
25 May 2023 (Note: This match, originally scheduled for 22 April 2023, was rescheduled due to United's involvement in the FA Cup semi-finals.)	Chelsea	H	4–1	Casemiro 6', Martial 45+6', Fernandes 73' (pen.), Rashford 78'	73,561	3rd
28 May 2023	Fulham	H	2–1	Sancho 39', Fernandes 55'	73,465	3rd

=== League table ===
Pos	Team	Pld	W	D	L	GF	GA	GD	Pts	Qualification or relegation
1	Manchester City (C)	38	28	5	5	94	33	+61	89	Qualification to Champions League group stage
2	Arsenal	38	26	6	6	88	43	+45	84	Qualification to Champions League group stage
3	Manchester United	38	23	6	9	58	43	+15	75	Qualification to Champions League group stage
4	Newcastle United	38	19	14	5	68	33	+35	71	Qualification to Champions League group stage
5	Liverpool	38	19	10	9	75	47	+28	67	Qualification to Europa League group stage (Note: Since the winners of the 2022–23 FA Cup, Manchester City, qualified for the Champions League, the spot given to the FA Cup winners (Europa League group stage) was passed to the sixth-placed team.)

Source: Premier League
Rules for classification: 1) Points; 2) Goal difference; 3) Goals scored; 4) If the champions, relegated teams or qualified teams for UEFA competitions cannot be determined by rules 1 to 3, rules 4.1 to 4.3 are applied – 4.1) Points gained in head-to-head record between such teams; 4.2) Away goals scored in head-to-head record between such teams; 4.3) Play-offs
(C) Champions

== FA Cup ==
As a Premier League side, United entered the 2022–23 FA Cup in the third round proper in January 2023. They were drawn against Everton and the match was played at Old Trafford on 6 January 2023 as the first match of the round. Antony opened the scoring after just four minutes, Conor Coady equalised ten minutes later. He then scored an own goal in the second half to give United the lead, before Marcus Rashford scored a third goal from the penalty spot.

In the fourth round proper, they were drawn at home to Championship side Reading. Casemiro scored two goals in five minutes, before Fred scored a third goal with a backheel. Amadou Salif Mbengue scored a consolation goal for the visitors in the 72nd minute.

In the fifth round proper, Manchester United were drawn at home again, this time against West Ham United. Despite falling behind in the 54th minute by Saïd Benrahma, an own goal from Nayef Aguerd levelled the tie in the 77th minute, before two late goals from Alejandro Garnacho and Fred secured the home side's progression to the quarter-finals, and a home tie with Fulham.

In the quarter-finals, United fell behind when Aleksandar Mitrović scored for Fulham in the 50th minute, his first FA Cup goal. A handball from Willian at the goal line led to a VAR referral, where Fulham manager Marco Silva attempted to influence the referee, which resulted in his dismissal. The referee then granted the penalty kick on review, and red carded Willian for denying a clear goalscoring opportunity. Right after Willian was shown the red card, an enraged Mitrović assaulted referee Chris Kavanagh, prompting his own immediate expulsion. Bruno Fernandes equalised from the penalty. Two minutes later, Marcel Sabitzer backheeled his first United goal following a pass from Luke Shaw. Fernandes secured the victory right before the final whistle, assisted by Fred, as they secured a fourth consecutive 3–1 cup win and a record 31st FA Cup semi-final. United were drawn against Brighton & Hove Albion, whom they defeated in the 1983 FA Cup final.

In the semi-final, United and Brighton both had chances before the match ended goalless after extra time. Both teams converted their first six penalties as it entered sudden death; Solly March missed Brighton's seventh attempt before Victor Lindelöf converted to take United into their 21st FA Cup final, their first since 2018 and the first FA Cup final to feature a Manchester derby.

The final gave United a chance to stop their local rivals City from becoming the second English team to win the treble, after United had done it themselves in 1999. İlkay Gündoğan scored a goal after only 13 seconds, the fastest goal to date in an FA Cup final, before Fernandes equalised from the penalty spot shortly after the half-hour mark. Gündoğan scored again in the second half to give City their seventh FA Cup title. This was United's ninth defeat in the FA Cup final and second in a row after also losing to Chelsea in 2018.

Date	Round	Opponents	H / A	Result F–A	Scorers	Attendance
6 January 2023	Third round	Everton	H	3–1	Antony 4', Coady 52' (o.g.), Rashford 90+7' (pen.)	72,306
28 January 2023	Fourth round	Reading	H	3–1	Casemiro (2) 54', 58', Fred 66'	73,460
1 March 2023	Fifth round	West Ham United	H	3–1	Aguerd 77' (o.g.), Garnacho 90', Fred 90+5'	72,571
19 March 2023	Quarter-finals	Fulham	H	3–1	Fernandes (2) 75' (pen.), 90+6', Sabitzer 77'	73,511
23 April 2023	Semi-finals	Brighton & Hove Albion	N	0–0 (a.e.t.) (7–6p)		81,445
3 June 2023	Final	Manchester City	N	1–2	Fernandes 33' (pen.)	83,179

== EFL Cup ==
As United were competing in UEFA competition in 2022–23, they entered the EFL Cup in the third round. They were drawn against Aston Villa, and the match was played at Old Trafford on 10 November 2022. United gave a debut to goalkeeper Martin Dúbravka, who kept a clean sheet in the first half, but within three minutes of the second half starting, United were behind to a goal from Ollie Watkins. Anthony Martial equalised 19 seconds after the ensuing kick-off, only for United to go behind again when Diogo Dalot diverted a ball from Leon Bailey into his own net just after the hour mark. Marcus Rashford equalised six minutes later, before Bruno Fernandes and Scott McTominay sealed the victory.

United received another home draw in the fourth round; they played against Burnley on 21 December 2022. Christian Eriksen opened the scoring in the first half before Rashford added a second after the half-time interval.

In the quarter-finals, Manchester United were drawn at home against the lowest-ranked team remaining in the competition, Charlton Athletic. In the sides' first meeting in nearly 16 years, a first-half goal from Antony, followed by two goals in five minutes from substitute Rashford late in the game secured United a place in the semi-finals. The match featured Kobbie Mainoo and Facundo Pellistri's competitive debuts for the club; the former started and played for an hour while the latter came on as a substitute at 84 minutes and assisted Rashford's first goal. This was also goalkeeper Tom Heaton's first start for the club.

In the semi-finals, United faced Nottingham Forest, whom they defeated in the 1992 final to lift their first League Cup title. In the first leg held at City Ground, Rashford opened the scoring inside six minutes. Wout Weghorst then scored just before half-time, his first goal for the club. Fernandes wrapped up the win with another strike. In the return leg, goals from Anthony Martial and Fred secured a 5–0 aggregate win and a final appearance against Newcastle United.

In the final, Casemiro opened the scoring before Rashford struck the second goal. United clung on to win their sixth League Cup and the club's first trophy since 2017. The 2–0 scoreline was a repeat of the 1999 FA Cup final. David de Gea kept his 181st clean sheet for the club during the match, surpassing the record held by Peter Schmeichel.

Date	Round	Opponents	H / A	Result F–A	Scorers	Attendance
10 November 2022	Third round	Aston Villa	H	4–2	Martial 49', Rashford 67', Fernandes 78', McTominay 90+1'	72,512
21 December 2022	Fourth round	Burnley	H	2–0	Eriksen 27', Rashford 57'	62,062
10 January 2023	Quarter-finals	Charlton Athletic	H	3–0	Antony 21', Rashford (2) 90', 90+4'	74,345
25 January 2023	Semi-finals; First leg	Nottingham Forest	A	3–0	Rashford 6', Weghorst 45', Fernandes 89'	29,325
1 February 2023	Semi-finals; Second leg	Nottingham Forest	H	2–0	Martial 73', Fred 76'	72,315
26 February 2023	Final	Newcastle United	N	2–0	Casemiro 33', Rashford 39'	87,306

== UEFA Europa League ==
=== Group stage ===
Having finished sixth in the 2021–22 Premier League, United qualified for the 2022–23 UEFA Europa League. They entered the competition in the group stage, which was drawn on 26 August 2022, with United in Pot 1 along with Roma, Arsenal, Lazio, Braga, Red Star Belgrade, Dynamo Kyiv and Olympiacos. They were drawn into Group E with Spanish club Real Sociedad, Moldovan champions Sheriff Tiraspol and Cypriot representative Omonia. They last met Sociedad in the 2020–21 UEFA Europa League round of 32, which they won 4–0 away and drew 0–0 at home. They also met in the 2013–14 UEFA Champions League group stage, when United drew 0–0 away and won 1–0 at home. The meetings with Sheriff and Omonia were United's first against teams from either Moldova or Cyprus. The group stage began on 8 September and concluded on 3 November 2022.

Before United's opening group match at home to Real Sociedad, a moment of silence was observed following the death of Queen Elizabeth II earlier that day. Real Sociedad's Brais Méndez scored the only goal of the game from the penalty spot after 59 minutes, following a contentious handball decision against substitute Lisandro Martínez, to give the Spanish side their first ever win over United. For the next match United travelled to Chișinău, where Zimbru Stadium hosted the match instead of Sheriff's regular stadium, Sheriff Stadium, Tiraspol, due to Transnistria's involvement in the Russian invasion of Ukraine. Jadon Sancho opened the scoring before Cristiano Ronaldo scored his first goal of the season via a penalty.

The next match saw United travel to Omonia's GSP Stadium in Nicosia. Despite a heavily dominant United display in the first half, Karim Ansarifard put Omonia into the lead after 34 minutes. Half-time substitutes Rashford and Martial put United 3–1 up before Nikolas Panayiotou scored a late consolation goal for the hosts. The return fixture was played the next week, with Scott McTominay scoring the game's winning goal.

United hosted Sheriff Tiraspol on 27 October, with Alejandro Garnacho making his first senior start for the club. Diogo Dalot scored the opener with a header. It was only his second ever goal for United, and the first since January 2020. Rashford then doubled the lead with another header before Ronaldo ensured United's passage to the Europa League knockout stage. On the final matchday, United needed to win by two goals in their return match against Real Sociedad at Anoeta Stadium to win the group. Garnacho scored his first senior goal for the club in the first half, but there were no further goals, which meant United finished second based on their overall goal difference.

Date	Opponents	H / A	Result F–A	Scorers	Attendance	Group position
8 September 2022	Real Sociedad	H	0–1		71,720	3rd
15 September 2022	Sheriff Tiraspol	A	2–0	Sancho 17', Ronaldo 39' (pen.)	8,734	2nd
6 October 2022	Omonia	A	3–2	Rashford (2) 53', 84', Martial 63'	20,011	2nd
13 October 2022	Omonia	H	1–0	McTominay 90+3'	73,132	2nd
27 October 2022	Sheriff Tiraspol	H	3–0	Dalot 44', Rashford 65', Ronaldo 81'	73,764	2nd
3 November 2022	Real Sociedad	A	1–0	Garnacho 17'	36,744	2nd

Pos	Team	Pld	W	D	L	GF	GA	GD	Pts	Qualification
1	(Spain) Real Sociedad	6	5	0	1	10	2	+8	15 (Note: Tied on head-to-head results. Overall goal difference is used as the tiebreaker.)	Advance to round of 16
2	(England) Manchester United	6	5	0	1	10	3	+7	15	Advance to knockout round play-offs
3	(Moldova) Sheriff Tiraspol	6	2	0	4	4	10	−6	6	Transfer to Europa Conference League
4	(Cyprus) Omonia	6	0	0	6	3	12	−9	0	

Source: UEFA
Rules for classification: Group stage tiebreakers

=== Knockout phase ===
Having finished second in their group, United played in the Europa League knock-out round playoffs against one of the eight third-placed teams from the UEFA Champions League group stage. There were no other English teams in the draw conducted on 7 November 2022, so all eight opponents were possible: Ajax, Barcelona, Bayer Leverkusen, Juventus, Red Bull Salzburg, Sevilla, Shakhtar Donetsk and Sporting CP. United were drawn first from the group runners-up pot, paired with Barcelona. The two teams have previously met in 13 competitive matches, most notably in the 1991 European Cup Winners' Cup final – which United won 2–1 – and the 2009 and 2011 UEFA Champions League finals, which Barcelona won 2–0 and 3–1, respectively. It was the sides' first meeting since the 2018–19 Champions League quarter-finals, which United lost 4–0 on aggregate. United came on a quest to win away against Barcelona for the first time ever, and almost did it. After Marcos Alonso scored the opener at the 50th minute, it only took two minutes for Marcus Rashford to score the equaliser, his 22nd goal of the campaign. It was his cross that forced Jules Koundé to make a mistake and scored an own goal seven minutes later. However, former Leeds United winger Raphinha, who assisted Alonso for the first goal, scored himself 14 minutes from full time as the teams settled for a 2–2 draw. In the second leg, United went behind after just 18 minutes to a penalty from Robert Lewandowski. Second half goals from Brazilian duo Fred and Antony turned around the match and tie as United secured only their fourth competitive win over Barcelona, and the first since the 2007–08 UEFA Champions League semi-finals.

In the round of 16, United were drawn against another Spanish side in Real Betis, the two clubs' first competitive encounter. In the first leg at Old Trafford, Rashford scored after just six minutes, with Ayoze Pérez equalising 26 minutes later. Second-half goals from Antony, Bruno Fernandes, and Wout Weghorst – his first home goal for United – secured a 4–1 win. In the second leg, a 56th minute goal from Rashford saw United secure a 1–0 win and progression to the quarter-finals with a 5–1 victory on aggregate.

In the quarter-finals, United were paired with yet another Spanish club in Sevilla, Betis's cross-city rivals. This was the first time in history that United had faced four different opponents from the same country in a single European campaign. United were looking to beat the Europa League's most successful side for the first time, having lost the 2017–18 UEFA Champions League round of 16 and 2019–20 UEFA Europa League semi-final ties. The first leg was held at home on 13 April, with United scoring two goals through Marcel Sabitzer inside 21 minutes. With six minutes left, Tyrell Malacia deflected a cross from former Manchester City winger Jesús Navas into his own net, and when Lisandro Martínez was injured shortly after, United were forced to play with 10 men, having already used all five substitutions. Two minutes into the added time, one of the substitutes, Harry Maguire, deflected a Youssef En-Nesyri cross into United's net as well. In the return leg, another error from Maguire enabled En-Nesyri to score within eight minutes. A looping header from Loïc Badé doubled Sevilla's lead two minutes after half time. En-Nesyri scored another goal nine minutes from time, taking advantage of a defensive error by David de Gea. A 3–0 defeat meant United were knocked out 5–2 on aggregate. This was the sixth consecutive season—all after winning the 2016–17 UEFA Europa League—in which United were eliminated by Spanish opposition in Europe, which started against Sevilla in 2017–18. United had not won their first five competitive games against Sevilla, the most they have faced a club in Europe without winning in their history.

Date	Round	Opponents	H / A	Result F–A	Scorers	Attendance
16 February 2023	Knockout round play-off First leg	Barcelona	A	2–2	Rashford 52', Koundé 59' (o.g.)	90,225
23 February 2023	Knockout round play-off Second leg	Barcelona	H	2–1	Fred 47', Antony 73'	73,021
9 March 2023	Round of 16; First leg	Real Betis	H	4–1	Rashford 6', Antony 52', Fernandes 58', Weghorst 82'	72,998
16 March 2023	Round of 16; Second leg	Real Betis	A	1–0	Rashford 56'	54,643
13 April 2023	Quarter-finals; First leg	Sevilla	H	2–2	Sabitzer (2) 14', 21'	72,825
20 April 2023	Quarter-finals; Second leg	Sevilla	A	0–3		41,974

== Squad statistics ==
No.	Pos.	Name	League		FA Cup		EFL Cup		Europe		Total		Discipline	
No.	Pos.	Name	Apps	Goals	Apps	Goals	Apps	Goals	Apps	Goals	Apps	Goals	Yellow card	Red card
1	GK	(Spain) David de Gea	38	0	6	0	2	0	12	0	58	0	2	0
2	DF	(Sweden) Victor Lindelöf	14(6)	0	4	0	3(1)	0	6(1)	0	27(8)	0	2	0
3	DF	(Ivory Coast) Eric Bailly	0	0	0	0	0	0	0	0	0	0	0	0
4	DF	(England) Phil Jones	0	0	0	0	0	0	0	0	0	0	0	0
5	DF	(England) Harry Maguire (c)	8(8)	0	3(1)	0	2(2)	0	3(4)	0	16(15)	0	9	0
6	DF	(Argentina) Lisandro Martínez	24(3)	1	1(2)	0	4(1)	0	9(1)	0	38(7)	1	10	0
7	FW	(Portugal) Cristiano Ronaldo	4(6)	1	0	0	0	0	6	2	10(6)	3	3	0
8	MF	(Portugal) Bruno Fernandes	37	8	6	3	5	2	10(1)	1	58(1)	14	12	0
9	FW	(France) Anthony Martial	11(10)	6	2	0	2(1)	2	2(1)	1	17(12)	9	0	0
10	FW	(England) Marcus Rashford	32(3)	17	5(1)	1	4(2)	6	5(4)	6	46(10)	30	3	0
11	FW	(England) Mason Greenwood	0	0	0	0	0	0	0	0	0	0	0	0
12	DF	(Netherlands) Tyrell Malacia	14(8)	0	3(1)	0	4	0	8(1)	0	29(10)	0	9	0
14	MF	(Denmark) Christian Eriksen	25(3)	1	4	0	2(2)	1	6(2)	0	37(7)	2	4	0
15	MF	(Austria) Marcel Sabitzer	7(4)	0	2(1)	1	0(1)	0	2(1)	2	11(7)	3	1	0
16	FW	(Ivory Coast) Amad Diallo	0	0	0	0	0	0	0	0	0	0	0	0
17	MF	(Brazil) Fred	12(23)	2	1(5)	2	4(2)	1	6(3)	1	23(33)	6	10	0
18	MF	(Brazil) Casemiro	24(4)	4	4(1)	2	4(2)	1	11(1)	0	43(8)	7	13	2
19	DF	(France) Raphaël Varane	22(2)	0	2(1)	0	2	0	5	0	31(3)	0	3	0
20	DF	(Portugal) Diogo Dalot	24(2)	1	3	0	3	0	8(2)	1	38(4)	2	8	0
21	FW	(Brazil) Antony	23(2)	4	4(1)	1	4(1)	1	8(1)	2	39(5)	8	8	0
22	GK	(England) Tom Heaton	0	0	0	0	2	0	0	0	2	0	0	0
23	DF	(England) Luke Shaw	30(1)	1	4	0	2(1)	0	4(5)	0	40(7)	1	12	0
25	FW	(England) Jadon Sancho	21(5)	6	2(1)	0	0(2)	0	6(4)	1	29(12)	7	0	0
27	FW	(Netherlands) Wout Weghorst	10(7)	0	3(2)	0	3	1	4(2)	1	20(11)	2	2	0
28	MF	(Uruguay) Facundo Pellistri	0(4)	0	0(1)	0	0(2)	0	1(2)	0	1(9)	0	3	0
29	DF	(England) Aaron Wan-Bissaka	16(3)	0	4	0	3(2)	0	5(1)	0	28(6)	0	3	0
30	GK	(England) Nathan Bishop	0	0	0	0	0	0	0	0	0	0	0	0
31 (Note: Martin Dúbravka wore number 31 until 1 January 2023 when he was recalled from loan by Newcastle United. Jack Butland subsequently replaced him as number 31 on 6 January 2023.)	GK	(Slovakia) Martin Dúbravka	0	0	0	0	2	0	0	0	2	0	0	0
31	GK	(England) Jack Butland	0	0	0	0	0	0	0	0	0	0	0	0
33	DF	(England) Brandon Williams	0	0	0	0	0(1)	0	0	0	0(1)	0	0	0
34	MF	(Netherlands) Donny van de Beek	2(5)	0	0	0	1	0	1(1)	0	4(6)	0	0	0
36	FW	(Sweden) Anthony Elanga	5(11)	0	0(1)	0	1(3)	0	1(4)	0	7(19)	0	0	0
38	DF	(England) Axel Tuanzebe	0	0	0	0	0	0	0	0	0	0	0	0
39	MF	(Scotland) Scott McTominay	10(14)	1	2(2)	0	3(1)	1	1(6)	1	16(23)	3	10	0
43	DF	(England) Teden Mengi	0	0	0	0	0	0	0	0	0	0	0	0
46	MF	(Tunisia) Hannibal Mejbri	0	0	0	0	0	0	0	0	0	0	0	0
47	FW	(England) Shola Shoretire	0	0	0	0	0	0	0	0	0	0	0	0
49	FW	(Argentina) Alejandro Garnacho	5(14)	3	1(3)	1	3(2)	0	2(4)	1	11(23)	5	4	0
50	GK	(Czech Republic) Radek Vítek	0	0	0	0	0	0	0	0	0	0	0	0
55	MF	(Iraq) Zidane Iqbal	0	0	0	0	0	0	0	0	0	0	0	0
56	FW	(England) Charlie McNeill	0	0	0	0	0	0	0(1)	0	0(1)	0	0	0
63	DF	(Spain) Marc Jurado	0	0	0	0	0	0	0	0	0	0	0	0
66	DF	(England) Rhys Bennett	0	0	0	0	0	0	0	0	0	0	0	0
73	MF	(England) Kobbie Mainoo	0(1)	0	0(1)	0	1	0	0	0	1(2)	0	0	0
80	DF	(England) Tyler Fredricson	0	0	0	0	0	0	0	0	0	0	0	0
Own goals			—	2	—	2	—	0	—	1	—	5	N/A	

== Transfers ==
On 14 June, Nemanja Matić was announced as a new Roma player after agreeing to join the Italian club on a free transfer. The move became official on 1 July, following the expiration of his contract with Manchester United.

On 17 June, Connor Stanley was announced as a new Bolton Wanderers player following his departure from Manchester United. The transfer became official on 1 July, when his contract with the club expired.

On 24 June, Reece Devine was announced as a new Swindon Town player after agreeing to join the club on a free transfer. The move became official on 1 July, following the expiration of his Manchester United contract.

On 30 June, several players left Manchester United as free agents after their contracts with the club came to an end. The List included Jesse Lingard, Paul Pogba, Juan Mata, Edinson Cavani, Nemanja Matić, Reece Devine, D'Mani Mellor, Connor Stanley. Lee Grant and Paul McShane also left Man Utd following their retirement from professional football.

On 2 July, Dean Henderson reached an agreement to join Nottingham Forest on loan for the 2022-23 season. The England international made the move in search of regular first-team football, temporarily leaving Manchester United for the newly promoted Premier League side.

On 4 July, D'Mani Mellor was announced as a new Wycombe Wanderers player after leaving Manchester United on a free transfer. The forward left the club after his contract expired, bringing his time at Manchester United to an end.

On 5 July, Tyrell Malacia completed his transfer to Manchester United from Feyenoord, becoming the club's first signing of the summer and the first arrival of Erik ten Hag's tenure. The Netherlands international signed a four-year contract with the club, with Manchester United also holding an option to extend his stay for a further year. Malacia arrived at Old Trafford after establishing himself as a regular for Feyenoord and became the first player signed by United following Ten Hag's appointment as manager.

On 7 July, Martin Šviderský completed a move to Almería after leaving Manchester United. The Slovak midfielder had been part of United's academy before departing the club at the end of his contract, subsequently joining the Spanish side on a permanent basis. His move marked the beginning of his senior career in Spain after his time in Manchester.

On 8 July, Dylan Levitt completed a permanent move to Dundee United, after reaching an agreement with the Scottish club. The Wales international had spent the previous season on loan at Dundee United, where he established himself as an important member of the first team, before returning to Scotland on a permanent basis. The transfer brought his time at Manchester United to an end after progressing through the club's academy.

On 11 July, Andreas Pereira completed a permanent move to Fulham after Manchester United reached an agreement with the newly promoted Premier League side. Pereira signed a four-year contract with an option for a further year, bringing an end to his time at Manchester United after more than a decade with the club. The transfer was completed for a fee of €9.5 million, with additional bonuses included in the agreement.

On 11 July, at the same day, Juventus confirmed the return of Paul Pogba, who rejoined the Italian club on a free transfer after his Manchester United contract expired. The France international signed a four-year contract with Juventus, returning to the club where he had previously played before.

On 15 July, Christian Eriksen joined Manchester United on a free transfer after leaving Brentford. The Denmark international signed a three-year contract with the club, becoming Erik ten Hag's second signing of the summer following Tyrell Malacia. Eriksen arrived at Old Trafford after impressing during his short spell with Brentford and became the first senior free-agent signing of Ten Hag's tenure.

On 21 July, Jesse Lingard agreed to join Nottingham Forest on a free transfer, signing a one-year contract with the club. The England international signed a one-year contract with the newly promoted Premier League side, bringing his long spell at Manchester United to an end.

On 26 July, Álvaro Fernández joined Preston North End on a season-long loan for the 2022–23 campaign. The Spanish left-back made the move after progressing through Manchester United's academy and seeking regular first-team football, having yet to make his senior debut for the club. The loan allowed Fernández to continue his development in the Championship while remaining under contract with Manchester United.

On 27 July, Lisandro Martínez completed his move to Manchester United from Ajax, becoming the club's third signing of the summer. The Argentina international signed a five-year contract with an option for a further year and reunited with Erik ten Hag, who had previously managed him at Ajax.

On 2 August, Tom Huddlestone joined Manchester United as a player-coach for the club's Under-21 side. The experienced midfielder returned to the club to combine his playing role with coaching responsibilities, helping to develop the younger players within United's academy.

On 4 August, Alex Telles joined Sevilla on loan for the 2022–23 season. The Brazilian left-back made the move after falling down the competition for a regular starting position at Manchester United, temporarily leaving the club to continue his career in Spain.

On 15 August, Ethan Laird joined Queens Park Rangers on a season-long loan for the 2022–23 campaign. The right-back returned to the Championship after previously spending time on loan with the club, with the move giving him another opportunity to gain regular first-team football.

On 16 August, Dermot Mee joined Altrincham on an emergency loan. The young goalkeeper made the temporary move to gain senior experience, with the initial agreement keeping him at the National League club until January 2023.

On 22 August, Casemiro completed his transfer to Manchester United from Real Madrid. The Brazil international signed a four-year contract with the club, with an option to extend his stay for a further year.

On 24 August, Manchester United reached an agreement with Marseille for Eric Bailly to spend the 2022–23 season on loan in France. The Ivorian defender moved to the Ligue 1 side, with the deal also including an option to buy.

On 29 August, Edinson Cavani completed his move to Valencia on a free transfer after leaving Manchester United at the end of his contract. The Uruguay international signed a two-year contract with the Spanish club, bringing his time at Old Trafford to an end.

On 29 August, Manchester United agreed a season-long loan deal with Birmingham City for Hannibal Mejbri. The Tunisia international moved to the Championship side for the 2022–23 campaign to gain regular first-team experience.

On 31 August, Deadline Day, Amad Diallo made the move to Sunderland on loan for the 2022–23 season. The Ivorian winger joined the Championship side to gain regular playing time and continue his development away from Manchester United.

On 1 September, Manchester United completed several transfer moves on the final day of the summer window. Will Fish joined Hibernian on loan for the 2022–23 season, while Ethan Galbraith moved to Salford City on a season-long loan. On the same day, Tahith Chong completed a permanent transfer to Birmingham City.The club also announced that day the permanent transfer of James Garner to Everton F.C.. Manchester United also completed the signing of goalkeeper Martin Dúbravka from Newcastle United on loan for the remainder of the 2022–23 season. At the same day, Antony completed his transfer to Manchester United from Ajax. The Brazil international signed a five-year contract with the club, with an option to extend his stay for a further year. The transfer made Antony the most expensive signing of the 2022–23 summer window and the second-most expensive transfer in Manchester United's history at the time, behind Paul Pogba's move from Juventus in 2016. Antony arrived at Old Trafford to reunite with Erik ten Hag, who had previously managed him at Ajax.

On 2 September Charlie Wellens joined Oldham Athletic on a loan for the 2022-23 season. The defender made the move to gain regular first-team experience after progressing through Manchester United's academy.

On 8 September, Galatasaray announced the signing of Juan Mata on a free deal. The Spain international agreed to a two-year contract with the Turkish club, with the second year being optional. One day after on 9 September, Matěj Kovář joined Sparta Prague on loan for the 2022–23 season. The Czech goalkeeper returned to his home country for the temporary move after spending the previous season on loan at Burton Albion.

On 22 November, Manchester United announced that Cristiano Ronaldo would leave the club by mutual agreement with immediate effect, bringing his second spell at Old Trafford to an early end. The decision followed a period of tension between the player and the club, which intensified after Ronaldo gave a televised interview in which he criticised Manchester United and manager Erik ten Hag. With his contract terminated, Ronaldo became a free agent and was able to join another club without a transfer fee. On 30 December, he completed a move to Saudi Arabian club Al-Nassr, on a free transfer, signing a contract that marked the beginning of his career in Saudi Arabia.

On 1 January, Martin Dúbravka returned to Newcastle United after Manchester United ended his loan spell early. The Slovak goalkeeper had joined United on loan in September 2022 for the remainder of the 2022–23 season, but returned to his parent club midway through the campaign.

On 6 January, Jack Butland joined Manchester United from Crystal Palace on loan for the remainder of the 2022–23 season. The England goalkeeper arrived as temporary cover following Dúbravka's return to Newcastle United, providing additional competition in goal.

On 13 January, Wout Weghorst joined Manchester United on loan from Burnley until the end of the 2022–23 season. The Netherlands international arrived to strengthen Erik ten Hag's attacking options after spending the first half of the campaign on loan at Beşiktaş.

On 19 January, Shola Shoretire joined Bolton Wanderers on loan for the remainder of the 2022–23 season. The young forward moved to the League One side to gain regular first-team experience, having previously made his senior appearances for Manchester United.

On 27 January, Charlie Savage joined Forest Green Rovers on loan for the remainder of the 2022–23 season. The midfielder made the move to gain regular senior experience after progressing through Manchester United's academy.

On 30 January, Ondřej Mastný joined Portadown on loan for the remainder of the 2022–23 season. The Czech goalkeeper moved to the Northern Irish club to gain regular first-team experience and continue his development away from Manchester United.

On 31 January, Manchester United completed two loan moves involving young players. Di'Shon Bernard joined Portsmouth on loan for the remainder of the 2022–23 season, while Charlie McNeill moved to Newport County on loan for the same period. Both players made the temporary moves to gain regular first-team experience during the second half of the campaign.

On 1 February, Manchester United completed several transfer moves following the closure of the January transfer window. The club signed Austrian midfielder Marcel Sabitzer from Bayern Munich on loan until the end of the 2022–23 season, making him the club's third signing of the January window after Jack Butland and Wout Weghorst. On the same day, Axel Tuanzebe joined Stoke City on loan for the remainder of the campaign. Manchester United also agreed a development arrangement with Altrincham involving three academy players, with Maximilian Oyedele, Sonny Aljofree and Joe Hugill joining the National League club to gain experience in senior football. The arrangement allowed the three young players to train and play with Altrincham while continuing to remain part of Manchester United's academy setup.

On 9 February, Tom Wooster joined Ramsbottom United on loan from Manchester United for the remainder of the 2022–23 season. The young goalkeeper made the move to gain senior experience after progressing through Manchester United's academy.

On 27 February 2023, 16-year-old Gabriele Biancheri joined Manchester United from Cardiff City on a permanent transfer. The Welsh forward signed a four-year contract with the club and initially joined Manchester United's youth setup, adding another young attacking player to the academy.

During the 2022–23 season, Manchester United's youth setup added several young players to its academy. The club brought in 14-year-old Louie Bradbury from Shrewsbury Town's youth setup and 13-year-old Zac Watson from Doncaster Rovers' academy, with both youngsters joining the club as part of its youth development system.

During the 2022–23 season, several young players also left Manchester United's youth setup. 16-year-old Harry Campbell joined Wigan Athletic's Under-18s, while 16-year-old Tom Jones moved to TNS Development and 16-year-old Toby Oliver joined Blackpool's academy. 12-year-old Cristiano Júnior also departed the club to join Al-Nassr's Under-15s, while Kai Crowe moved to Blackpool's youth setup.

Manchester United's Under-18s also added 16-year-old goalkeeper Elyh Harrison from Stevenage's Under-18s, with the youngster joining the club as part of the academy's youth development system.

Several players also left Manchester United's Under-18s, with 18-year-old goalkeeper Daniel Polakowski departing on a free transfer to Jaspers, while 17-year-old goalkeeper Eric Hanbury joined Southampton's Under-18s on loan.

=== In ===
Date	Pos.	Name	From	Fee	Ref.
5 July 2022	DF	(Netherlands) Tyrell Malacia	(Netherlands) Feyenoord	Undisclosed (Note: Reported as £13 million, plus £1.7 million in add-ons)	
15 July 2022	MF	(Denmark) Christian Eriksen	Unattached (Note: Most recently played for Brentford)	Free	
27 July 2022	DF	(Argentina) Lisandro Martínez	(Netherlands) Ajax	Undisclosed (Note: Reported as £49 million, plus £8.5 million in add-ons)	
2 August 2022	MF	(England) Tom Huddlestone	Unattached (Note: Most recently played for Hull City)	Free	
22 August 2022	MF	(Brazil) Casemiro	(Spain) Real Madrid	Undisclosed (Note: Reported as £60 million, plus £10 million in add-ons)	
1 September 2022	FW	(Brazil) Antony	(Netherlands) Ajax	Undisclosed (Note: Reported as £82 million, plus up to £4.3 million in add-ons)	
27 February 2023	FW	(Wales) Gabriele Biancheri	(Wales) Cardiff City	Undisclosed	

=== Out ===
Date	Pos.	Name	To	Fee	Ref.
30 June 2022	GK	(England) Lee Grant	Retired		
30 June 2022	DF	(Republic of Ireland) Paul McShane	Retired		
30 June 2022	FW	(Uruguay) Edinson Cavani	Released (Note: Joined Valencia after release)		
30 June 2022	DF	(England) Reece Devine	(England) Swindon Town	Free	
30 June 2022	MF	(England) Jesse Lingard	Released (Note: Joined Nottingham Forest after release)		
30 June 2022	MF	(Spain) Juan Mata	Released (Note: Joined Galatasaray after release)		
30 June 2022	MF	(Serbia) Nemanja Matić	(Italy) Roma	Free	
30 June 2022	FW	(England) D'Mani Mellor	(England) Wycombe Wanderers	Free	
30 June 2022	MF	(France) Paul Pogba	Released (Note: Joined Juventus after release)		
30 June 2022	MF	(England) Connor Stanley	(England) Bolton Wanderers	Free	
7 July 2022	MF	(Slovakia) Martin Šviderský	(Spain) Almería	Undisclosed	
8 July 2022	MF	(Wales) Dylan Levitt	(Scotland) Dundee United	Undisclosed	
11 July 2022	MF	(Brazil) Andreas Pereira	(England) Fulham	Undisclosed (Note: Reported as £10 million, plus £3 million in add-ons)	
1 September 2022	FW	(Netherlands) Tahith Chong	(England) Birmingham City	Undisclosed (Note: Reported as £1.5 million)	
1 September 2022	MF	(England) James Garner	(England) Everton	Undisclosed (Note: Reported as £9 million, plus £6 million in add-ons)	
23 November 2022	FW	(Portugal) Cristiano Ronaldo	Released (Note: Joined Al Nassr after release)		

=== Loan in ===
Date from	Date to	Pos.	Name	From	Ref.
1 September 2022	1 January 2023 (Note: On 1 January, Dúbravka was recalled back to Newcastle United)	GK	(Slovakia) Martin Dúbravka	(England) Newcastle United	
6 January 2023	End of season	GK	(England) Jack Butland	(England) Crystal Palace	
13 January 2023	End of season	FW	(Netherlands) Wout Weghorst	(England) Burnley	
1 February 2023	End of season	MF	(Austria) Marcel Sabitzer	(Germany) Bayern Munich	

=== Loan out ===
Date from	Date to	Pos.	Name	To	Ref.
2 July 2022	End of season	GK	(England) Dean Henderson	(England) Nottingham Forest	
26 July 2022	End of season	DF	(Spain) Álvaro Fernández	(England) Preston North End	
4 August 2022	End of season	DF	(Brazil) Alex Telles	(Spain) Sevilla	
15 August 2022	End of season	DF	(England) Ethan Laird	(England) Queens Park Rangers	
16 August 2022	1 January 2023	GK	(Northern Ireland) Dermot Mee	(England) Altrincham	
24 August 2022	End of season	DF	(Ivory Coast) Eric Bailly	(France) Marseille	
29 August 2022	End of season	MF	(Tunisia) Hannibal Mejbri	(England) Birmingham City	
31 August 2022	End of season	FW	(Ivory Coast) Amad Diallo	(England) Sunderland	
1 September 2022	End of season	DF	(England) Will Fish	(Scotland) Hibernian	
1 September 2022	End of season	MF	(Northern Ireland) Ethan Galbraith	(England) Salford City	
2 September 2022	End of season	DF	(England) Charlie Wellens	(England) Oldham Athletic	
9 September 2022	End of season	GK	(Czech Republic) Matěj Kovář	(Czech Republic) Sparta Prague	
19 January 2023	End of season	FW	(England) Shola Shoretire	(England) Bolton Wanderers	
27 January 2023	End of season	MF	(Wales) Charlie Savage	(England) Forest Green Rovers	
30 January 2023	End of season	GK	(Czech Republic) Ondřej Mastný	(Northern Ireland) Portadown	
31 January 2023	End of season	DF	(Jamaica) Di'Shon Bernard	(England) Portsmouth	
31 January 2023	End of season	FW	(England) Charlie McNeill	(Wales) Newport County	
1 February 2023	End of season	DF	(England) Axel Tuanzebe	(England) Stoke City	
1 February 2023	End of season	DF	(Poland) Maxi Oyedele	(England) Altrincham	
1 February 2023	End of season	DF	(England) Sonny Aljofree	(England) Altrincham	
1 February 2023	End of season	FW	(England) Joe Hugill	(England) Altrincham	
9 February 2023	End of season	GK	(England) Tom Wooster	(England) Ramsbottom United	
