= Diogo Dalot =

Portuguese footballer (born 1999)

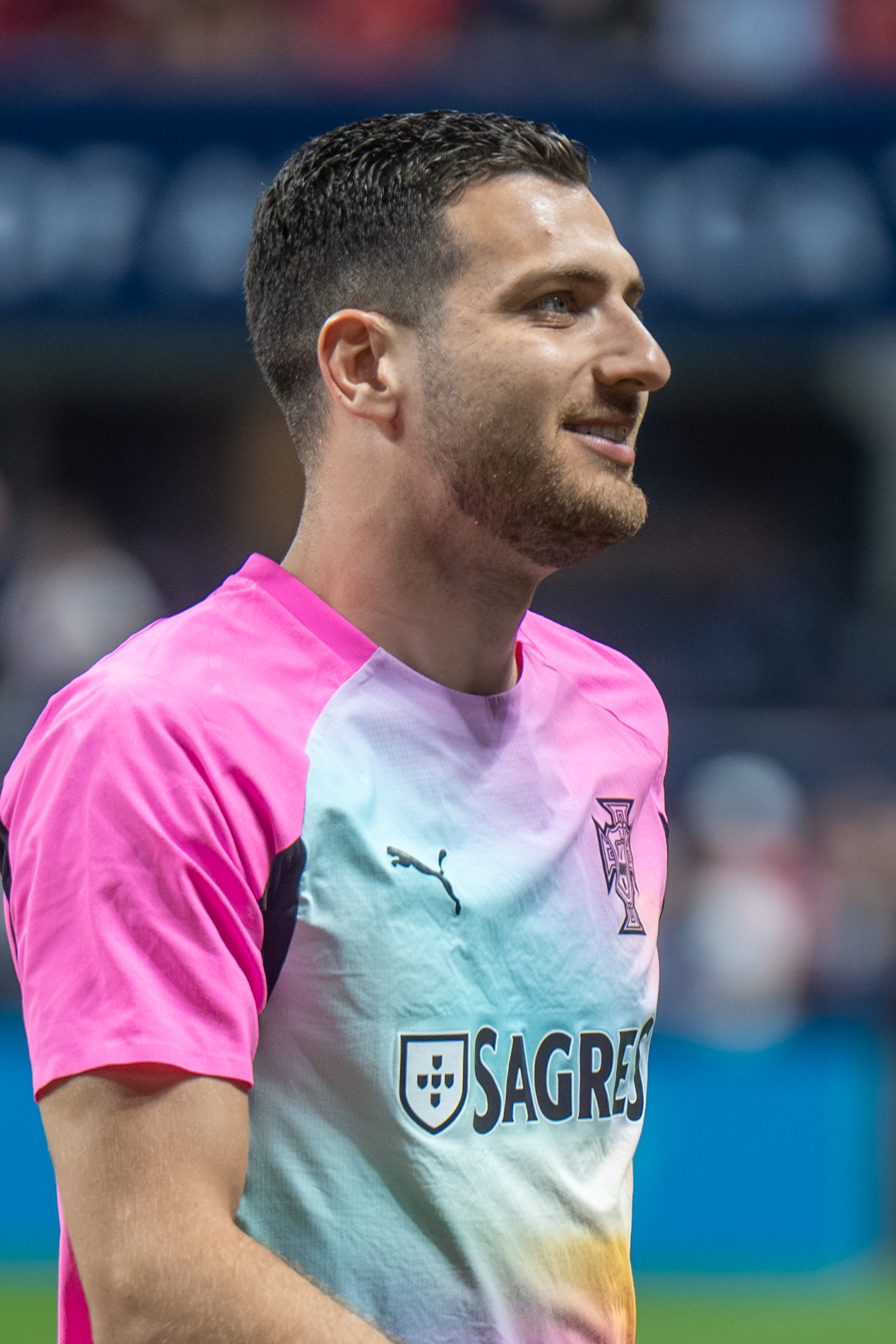
- Dalot with Portugal in 2026

Personal information
- Full name: José Diogo Dalot Teixeira
- Date of birth: 18 March 1999 (age 27)
- Place of birth: Braga, Portugal
- Height: 1.83 m (6 ft 0 in)
- Position: Full-back

Team information
- Current team: Manchester United
- Number: 2

Youth career
- 2008–2017: Porto

Senior career*
Years	Team	Apps	(Gls)
2017–2018	Porto B	23	(2)
2017–2018	Porto	6	(0)
2018–	Manchester United	184	(4)
2020–2021	→ AC Milan (loan)	21	(1)

International career^{‡}
2014	Portugal U15	2	(0)
2014–2015	Portugal U16	8	(0)
2015–2016	Portugal U17	19	(2)
2016–2017	Portugal U19	15	(0)
2017–2019	Portugal U20	12	(0)
2017–2021	Portugal U21	15	(0)
2021–	Portugal	42	(3)
Medal record
Men's football
Representing Portugal
UEFA Nations League
Winner	2025 Germany
UEFA European U21 Championship
Runner-up	2021 Hungary–Slovenia
UEFA European U19 Championship
Runner-up	2017 Georgia
UEFA European U17 Championship
Winner	2016 Azerbaijan
- * Club domestic league appearances and goals as of 21:05, 22 November 2026 (UTC) ‡ National team caps and goals as of 22:55, 17 November 2026 (UTC)

José Diogo Dalot Teixeira (European Portuguese pronunciation: [diˈoɣu ðaˈlo]; born 18 March 1999) is a Portuguese professional footballer who plays as a full-back for Premier League club Manchester United and the Portugal national team.

Dalot is a product of the Porto youth system and made his professional debut for the club's B team in January 2017. He made his first-team debut in a Taça de Portugal game in October 2017. After making eight appearances for Porto, he joined Manchester United in June 2018, for a reported fee of €22 million (£19 million). From October 2020 to June 2021, Dalot was loaned to Italian Serie A club Milan.

Dalot was a youth international and represented Portugal from under-15 to under-21 level. He was a member of the under-17 squad that won the 2016 UEFA European Under-17 Championship. He made his senior international debut for Portugal at UEFA Euro 2020.

== Club career ==
=== Porto ===
Born in Braga, Dalot joined Porto's youth system in 2008, aged nine. On 28 January 2017, he made his senior debut with the B team, playing the full 90 minutes in a 2–1 home loss against Leixões for the LigaPro championship.

Dalot first appeared with the first-team in a competitive game on 13 October 2017, starting in a 6–0 away win over Lusitano de Évora for the season's Taça de Portugal. He first played in the Primeira Liga on 18 February 2018, coming on as a 75th-minute substitute in a 5–0 home routing of Rio Ave.

=== Manchester United ===
==== 2018–20: First seasons in Manchester ====
Dalot signed for Premier League club Manchester United on 6 June 2018 on a five-year contract for a fee of £19 million. Upon his arrival in Manchester, coach José Mourinho said that, considering his young age, he was one of the best right-backs around. He made his debut on 19 September 2018 in an away UEFA Champions League group stage match against Swiss side Young Boys, but was unable to have continuity in the team due to an injury sustained in the previous season.

He made his Premier League debut on 1 December in a 2–2 away draw against Southampton. Despite Mourinho's sacking and Ole Gunnar Solskjaer being appointed as the new manager, Dalot remained a valuable option: at the end of the season, he made 23 appearances. During that season, he had a memorable match in Paris, in the Champions League round of 16 2nd leg against Paris Saint-Germain, where Manchester United completed a remarkable comeback due to a late penalty, won after a shot by Dalot. He scored the second goal in a 6–0 FA Cup win against Tranmere Rovers; it was his first goal for United. During his first seasons for the club, Dalot struggled with various injuries and following the arrival of Aaron Wan-Bissaka, his performances were severely limited under manager Ole Gunnar Solskjaer.

==== 2020–21: Loan to Milan ====
Following sporadic use by Manchester United, Dalot was loaned to Italian Serie A side Milan for the 2020–21 season. He made his debut for Milan on 22 October, starting in a 3–1 win against Celtic in a UEFA Europa League group stage match. Seven days later, Dalot scored his first goal for Milan and provided an assist for compatriot Rafael Leão in a 3–0 home group stage victory in the UEFA Europa League against Sparta Prague. He made his Serie A debut on 1 November, replacing Davide Calabria in the 71st-minute of a 2–1 away win against Udinese. He made his first start in the league in a 2–2 away draw against Genoa. On 7 March 2021, Dalot scored his first Serie A goal in a 2–0 away win at Hellas Verona.

During the season, Dalot's versatility enabled him to play either as a right back and left back. This made him an integral part of Stefano Pioli's team, helping Milan secure second place in the 2020–21 Serie A and qualification for the 2021–22 UEFA Champions League after an eight-year absence. During his spell as a Rossonero, he was able to play regularly, making 33 appearances, scoring two goals and providing three assists. As often said by Dalot himself, in Italy he was able to improve defensively, without losing his ability to attack.

==== 2021–23: Return from loan and breakthrough ====
During the summer of 2021, Manchester United were interested in signing another right-back. Meanwhile, Milan, who were impressed with Dalot during his loan move with the club, began negotiations with Manchester United to sign him on permanent basis. After returning to Manchester United, he impressed coach Ole Gunnar Solskjaer with his performances during pre-season. Borussia Dortmund were also interested in signing him on a loan deal, but he decided to remain at United to compete with Aaron Wan-Bissaka for a starting position.

On 22 September, Dalot was given his first start of the season, featuring in a 1–0 home loss to West Ham United in the third round of the EFL Cup. Since then, he has had limited opportunities with two starts and three substitute appearances. He played against Villarreal in a Champions League group stage match after Wan-Bissaka was suspended for two games.

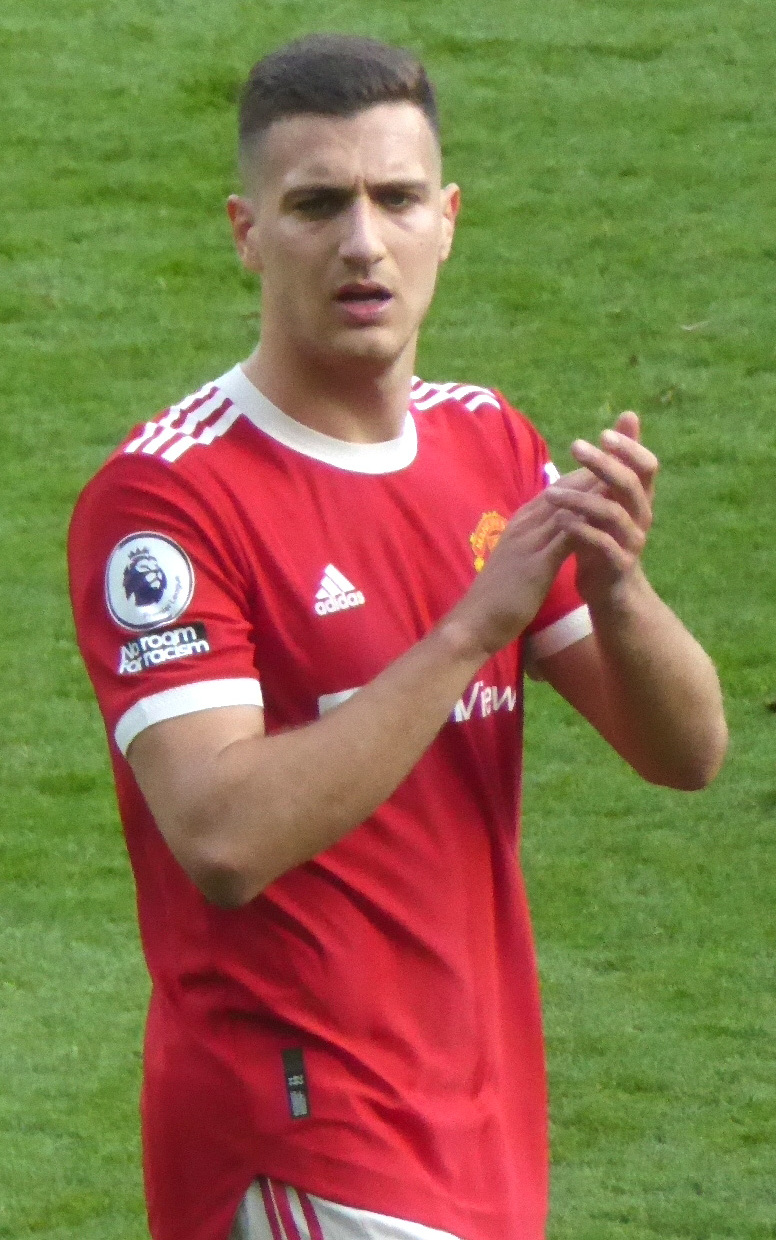
Dalot playing for Manchester United during the 2021–22 season

On 2 December, Dalot was given his first start in the league under interim manager Michael Carrick, putting an impressive performance and creating the second goal in a 3–2 home win over United's rivals Arsenal at Old Trafford. Following the arrival of interim manager Ralf Rangnick, Dalot cemented his place as starter for the club, following his solid performances in the club's next two matches against Crystal Palace and Norwich City. However, his form alongside his team declined during the season, with United finishing a disappointing sixth place and qualifying for the UEFA Europa League.

During the summer, after the club, failed to sign a new right-back to strengthen their defence, Dalot was presented with the opportunity to usurp Aaron Wan-Bissaka in the pecking order, which he seized immediately, with his attacking performances and ability to be involved with play in the final third, impressing new manager Erik ten Hag, leading Dalot's performances to be highly lauded, receiving various praises as United's most improved player during the 2022–23 season. On 20 December 2022, British media reported that the club had extended Dalot's contract by a year.

On 26 February 2023, Dalot started in the 2023 EFL Cup final as Manchester United beat Newcastle United 2–0 at Wembley Stadium, winning his first trophy with the club. On 16 April, he scored his first Premier League goal in a 2–0 away win at Nottingham Forest. On 31 May, Dalot extended his contract with the club until 30 June 2028, with an option for a further year.

==== 2023–24: United Players' Player of the Year and FA Cup ====
On 17 December, Dalot was sent off for the first time in his playing career for arguing with the referee Michael Oliver that his side should have had a throw-in against Mohamed Salah in the game against their bitter rivals Liverpool. Despite this, his side held on for the draw at Anfield. Throughout the 2023–24 season, Dalot developed into a right-back, who contributed decisively at both ends of the pitch, due to injuries from his teammates such as Luke Shaw, he was asked to adapt throughout the season, playing left-back, performing well, specially in the final months of the season, leading him to be named the club's Players' Player of the Year.

==== 2025–26 ====
Dalot would be wearing the number 2 jersey from the 2025–26 season onwards, which was previously worn by Victor Lindelöf.

== International career ==
=== Youth ===
Dalot helped Portugal win the 2016 UEFA European Under-17 Championship, scoring twice in five games in Azerbaijan including once in the final against Spain. The same year, he helped the under-19 team reach the quarter-finals of the same competition.

With the under-19s, Dalot participated in the 2017 UEFA European Under-19 Championship, helping finishing as runner-up, after losing in the final to England. For his performances throughout the competition, he was named in the "Team of the Tournament". Dalot played for Portugal at the 2017 FIFA U-20 World Cup, starting in all the matches in an eventual quarter-final exit.

On 10 November 2017, he won his first cap for the Portugal under-21s, starting in a 1–1 away draw against Romania for the 2019 UEFA European Championship qualifiers. Starting in March 2021, Dalot took part in the 2021 European Under-21 Championship. Portugal finished as runners-up after losing in the final 1–0 to Germany, on 6 June 2021.

=== Senior ===
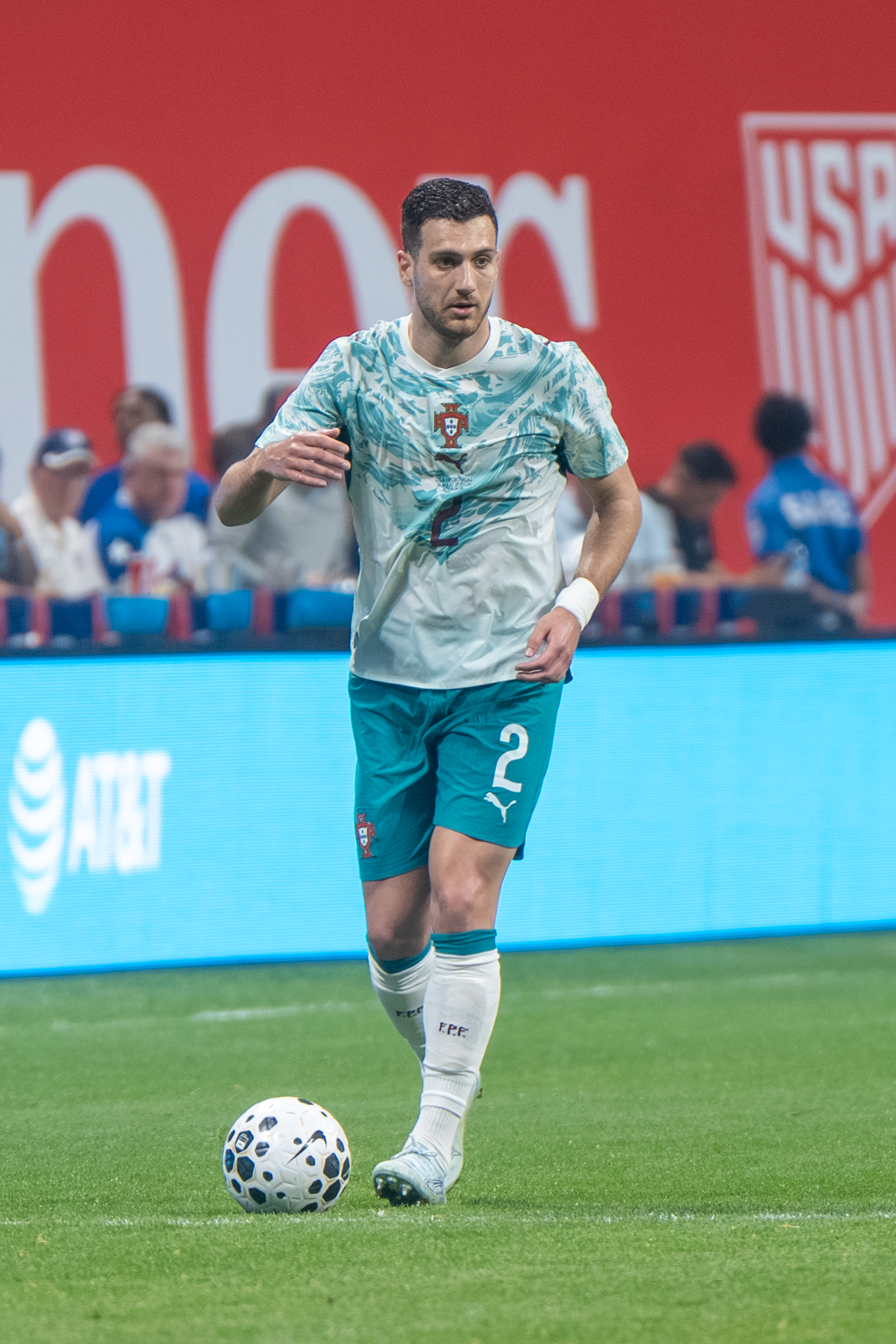
Dalot with Portugal in 2026

On 13 June 2021, Dalot was included in Portugal's squad for UEFA Euro 2020 as a replacement for João Cancelo, who withdrew after testing positive for COVID-19. He made his debut ten days later in the final group game – a 2–2 draw with France in Budapest – in which he replaced Nélson Semedo for the final 11 minutes. On 27 June, Dalot made his first start with the senior national team, in a 1–0 loss to Belgium in the round 16.

In October 2021, he was called up by Portugal and on 9 October, he provided two assists, with the first being converted by Cristiano Ronaldo in a 3–0 home win against Qatar. On 24 September 2022, Dalot scored his first two international goals in a 4–0 away win against the Czech Republic during the 2022–23 UEFA Nations League.

In October, he was named in Portugal's preliminary 55-man squad for the 2022 FIFA World Cup in Qatar, being included in the final 26-man squad for the tournament. Dalot initially started the tournament on the bench, but was selected to start the third Group H match against South Korea in place of the injured Nuno Mendes. He assisted Ricardo Horta's opening goal in the fifth minute of the 2–1 loss. Dalot retained his place in the team's round of 16 game against Switzerland, with Portugal winning the match 6–1. Portugal employed the same strategy in the quarter-finals against Morocco, with Dalot starting once again. However, Portugal lost 1–0, and as result were eliminated from the tournament.

On 21 May 2024, Dalot was named in Portugal's squad for UEFA Euro 2024 in Germany. He started the team's opening match against Czech Republic, where he was substituted for Gonçalo Inácio in the 63rd minute. He also played the full 90 minutes of the final Group F fixture against Georgia which Portugal lost 2–0. Portugal were eliminated in the quarter-finals to France after losing 5–3 in a penalty shootout.

On 19 May 2026, Dalot was selected in the 26-man squad for the 2026 FIFA World Cup.

== Style of play ==
Dalot is a physically strong defender known for his speed, technique and offensive capabilities. He can play as a full back or winger on either flank, although he usually plays on the right. He is usually deployed as a wing-back on the right but in a more conventional full-back role on the left. As a left-back, he has been praised for his work ethic and defensive awareness. He has great dribbling skill and is noted for his involvement in counter-attacks by making crosses or long passes. His physique enables him to perform well in aerial duels.

== Career statistics ==
=== Club ===
As of match played 22 November 2026

Appearances and goals by club, season and competition
Club	Season	League			National cup (Note: Includes Taça de Portugal, FA Cup, Coppa Italia)		League cup (Note: Includes EFL Cup)		Europe		Other		Total	
Club	Season	Division	Apps	Goals	Apps	Goals	Apps	Goals	Apps	Goals	Apps	Goals	Apps	Goals
Porto B	2016–17	LigaPro	3	0	—		—		—		—		3	0
Porto B	2017–18	LigaPro	20	2	—		—		—		—		20	2
Porto B	Total		23	2	—		—		—		—		23	2
Porto	2017–18	Primeira Liga	6	0	1	0	0	0	1 (Note: Appearance(s) in UEFA Champions League)	0	—		8	0
Manchester United	2018–19	Premier League	16	0	2	0	1	0	4	0	—		23	0
Manchester United	2019–20	Premier League	4	0	4	1	0	0	3 (Note: Appearances in UEFA Europa League)	0	—		11	1
Manchester United	2020–21	Premier League	0	0	—		1	0	—		—		1	0
Manchester United	2021–22	Premier League	24	0	2	0	1	0	3	0	—		30	0
Manchester United	2022–23	Premier League	26	1	3	0	3	0	10	1	—		42	2
Manchester United	2023–24	Premier League	36	2	6	1	2	0	6	0	—		50	3
Manchester United	2024–25	Premier League	33	0	3	0	3	0	13	3	1 (Note: Appearance in FA Community Shield)	0	53	3
Manchester United	2025–26	Premier League	34	1	1	0	1	0	—		—		36	1
Manchester United	2026–27	Premier League	11	0	0	0	1	0	3	0	—		15	0
Manchester United	Total		184	4	21	2	13	0	42	4	1	0	261	10
Milan (loan)	2020–21	Serie A	21	1	2	0	—		10	1	—		33	2
Career total			234	7	24	2	13	0	53	5	1	0	325	14

=== International ===
As of match played 17 November 2026

Appearances and goals by national team and year
National team	Year	Apps	Goals
Portugal	2021	4	0
Portugal	2022	6	2
Portugal	2023	6	0
Portugal	2024	11	1
Portugal	2025	4	0
Portugal	2026	11	0
Total		42	3

Scores and results list Portugal's goal tally first, score column indicates score after each Dalot goal.

List of international goals scored by Diogo Dalot
No.	Date	Venue	Opponent	Score	Result	Competition
1	24 September 2022	Fortuna Arena, Prague, Czech Republic	Czech Republic	1–0	4–0	2022–23 UEFA Nations League A
2	24 September 2022	Fortuna Arena, Prague, Czech Republic	Czech Republic	3–0	4–0	2022–23 UEFA Nations League A
3	5 September 2024	Estádio da Luz, Lisbon, Portugal	Croatia	1–0	2–1	2024–25 UEFA Nations League A

== Honours ==
Porto

- Primeira Liga: 2017–18

Manchester United

- FA Cup: 2023–24
- EFL Cup: 2022–23
- UEFA Europa League runner-up: 2024–25

Portugal U17

- UEFA European Under-17 Championship: 2016

Portugal U19

- UEFA European Under-19 Championship runner-up: 2017

Portugal U21

- UEFA European Under-21 Championship runner-up: 2021

Portugal

- UEFA Nations League: 2024–25

Individual

- UEFA European Under-17 Championship Team of the Tournament: 2016
- UEFA European Under-19 Championship Team of the Tournament: 2017
- Manchester United Players' Player of the Year: 2023–24
