= Antony (footballer, born 2000) =

Brazilian footballer (born 2000)

- Antony playing for Betis in 2026

Personal information
- Full name: Antony Matheus dos Santos
- Date of birth: 24 February 2000 (age 26)
- Place of birth: Osasco, São Paulo, Brazil
- Height: 1.72 m (5 ft 8 in)
- Position: Right winger

Team information
- Current team: Betis
- Number: 7

Youth career
- –2018: São Paulo

Senior career*
Years	Team	Apps	(Gls)
2018–2020	São Paulo	48	(6)
2020–2022	Ajax	57	(18)
2022–2025	Manchester United	62	(5)
2025	→ Betis (loan)	17	(5)
2025–	Betis	44	(9)

International career^{‡}
- Brazil U23
2021–2023	Brazil	16	(2)
Medal record
Men's football
Representing Brazil
Olympic Games
Gold medal – first place	2020 Tokyo	Team
- * Club domestic league appearances and goals as of 23:21, 21 November 2026 (UTC) ‡ National team caps and goals as of 23:06, 25 March 2023 (UTC)

Antony Matheus dos Santos (born 24 February 2000), known mononymously as Antony (Brazilian Portuguese: [ˈɐ̃tõni]), is a Brazilian professional footballer who plays as a right winger for La Liga club Real Betis.

Antony graduated from the São Paulo academy and made his senior debut for the club in 2018. He moved abroad to Ajax in the summer of 2020, where he won two Eredivisie titles and one KNVB Cup during his two seasons. Antony's performances in the Netherlands led to a transfer worth €95 million (£82 million) to Premier League side Manchester United, the highest sum paid for an Eredivisie player. He fell out of favour at Manchester United after manager Erik ten Hag, who had managed Antony at Ajax, was replaced by Ruben Amorim in November 2024. He was loaned to Real Betis in January 2025 for the remainder of the 2024–25 season, before joining the club permanently that summer.

Antony won a gold medal with the Brazil under-23 team at the 2020 Summer Olympics. He then made his senior international debut and scored against Venezuela in October 2021, going on to represent Brazil at the 2022 FIFA World Cup.

== Early life ==
Antony was born in Osasco, São Paulo, and grew up in Inferninho, a favela far from the city centre. Growing up, he would play football wherever he could on the streets or in his house, combining his love of futsal with street football and regularly attending São Paulo matches with his aunt.

== Club career ==
=== São Paulo ===
He began playing football at an early age, and he was spotted by São Paulo and inducted into their youth academy. During his youth years, Antony struggled for game time and was close to being dismissed from the club's youth ranks, but the staff convinced his manager to keep him. While in the youth academy, Antony met Helinho and Igor Gomes, becoming friends in the process. In September 2018, Antony helped his team win the J-League Challenge tournament in Japan, and named the tournament's best player.

Later that month, on 26 September, Antony, alongside Helinho and Igor Gomes, was promoted to the senior team, and he signed a contract until September 2023. On 15 November, he made his first-team debut, coming on as a substitute for Helinho in a 1–1 draw against Grêmio. He was demoted to the club's under-20 team, to take part in the Copa São Paulo de Futebol Júnior, which his team won. He scored in the final against Vasco da Gama, and named the tournament's best player, for his four goals and six assists in the nine games he played in the competition.

Following his displays in the tournament, Antony returned to the first team, and with São Paulo struggling in the Campeonato Paulista, he began playing more first-team matches. He scored his first goal on 21 March, in a 1–1 draw against São Caetano, with the Tricolor conceding a goal in stoppage time. He scored two goals, including one in the final against Corinthians a month later, where his side lost 2–1 on aggregate. On 18 July, he agreed to an extension until 2024.

On 5 March 2020, Antony made his debut in the Copa Libertadores, starting in São Paulo's 2–1 loss to Peruvian side Binacional. Following the outbreak of the COVID-19 pandemic, the season was halted for various months, and as such Antony made his last appearance for the club on 14 March, featuring in the 2–1 victory over rivals Santos in the San-São derby.

=== Ajax ===
On 23 February 2020, Ajax signed Antony on a five-year deal, effective from 1 July 2020, for an initial £13 million, which could have risen to £18.2 million. He made his debut for the club on 13 September 2020, scoring the only goal of an away win over Sparta Rotterdam. He made his debut in the UEFA Champions League on 27 October, in a 2–2 draw against Atalanta, leaving the field in the 90th minute, following a collision with Ruslan Malinovskyi, before scoring his first goal in the competition on 3 November 2020, in a 2–1 away win over Midtjylland.

During the 2020–21 season, Antony competed with David Neres for a spot in the starting line-up, eventually appearing to 46 times. He finished the season with eleven goals and ten assists, including a goal in the 3–1 defeat of Vitesse in the domestic cup final, helping Ajax win the domestic double of the Eredivisie and the KNVB Cup.

The following season, despite the signings of Mohamed Daramy and Steven Berghuis, Antony kept his place in the starting line-up, and with his two goals and five assists against Sporting CP and Borussia Dortmund, Ajax became the first Dutch club to win all six Champions League group games in the competition's history. His three goals and one assist earned him the league's Player of the Month and Talent of the Month award for December. On 20 March, Antony scored a late winner in a 3–2 victory against De Klassieker rivals Feyenoord in the Eredivisie, five minutes into the added time, before being sent off, after receiving a second yellow card seconds later for time wasting.

Nine days later, while on international duty for Brazil national team, during a World Cup qualification match, Antony suffered an ankle injury, which ruled him out for the remainder of the season. He ended the campaign with twelve goals and ten assists, as Ajax retained their Eredivisie title.

"I was very happy in Amsterdam, I won titles at Ajax, made friends and built part of my career, but now I reinforce that I am ready and full of motivation to follow my story and my dreams. People need to listen to me and understand that my motivation moves me towards happiness."

— Antony on his decision to leave Ajax in an interview with Fabrizio Romano on 26 August 2022.

Following his return from injury against Fortuna Sittard on 6 August, the 2022–23 season was preceded by a dispute over Antony' desire to leave Ajax. After Ajax rejected the interest expressed in him by Manchester United, including an €85 million transfer bid, he failed to turn up to training, and was left out of the matchday squads against Sparta Rotterdam and Utrecht. In an interview, Antony revealed that he had wanted to leave in February, but he waited to the end of the summer window for the transfer to proceed, rejecting a contract renewal from Ajax to "follow his dreams".

=== Manchester United ===
Antony with Manchester United in 2022

On 30 August 2022, Ajax confirmed they had reached an agreement with Manchester United for Antony's transfer. Two days later, Antony signed a five-year contract for a transfer fee of €95 million (£82 million), with a further €5 million (£4.27 million) in add-ons, the third highest transfer fee ever paid by the club after Paul Pogba and Romelu Lukaku and this was Ajax's and the Eredivisie's biggest transfer ever. Upon his arrival, he was handed the number 21 shirt previously worn by Edinson Cavani, who had recently departed the club.

On 4 September, Antony scored on his debut for the club in a 3–1 home league victory over rivals Arsenal. He scored again in United's next league match, a 6–3 defeat to local rivals Manchester City on 2 October. The next week, he scored for a third successive league game to equalise the score at Everton, as United won 2–1, becoming the first United player to score in their first three consecutive Premier League games.

On 23 February 2023, Antony scored the winner in a 2–1 Europa League playoff match, coming on as a substitute at half-time, over Barcelona, a day before his 23rd birthday. On 26 February, he started in the 2023 EFL Cup final as Manchester United beat Newcastle United 2–0 at Wembley, winning his first trophy with the club. After not being able to score at Old Trafford for over a year, Antony ended his goal drought on 17 March 2024, scoring in a 4–3 victory against arch-rivals Liverpool in the FA Cup quarter-finals.

=== Betis ===
==== Initial loan ====
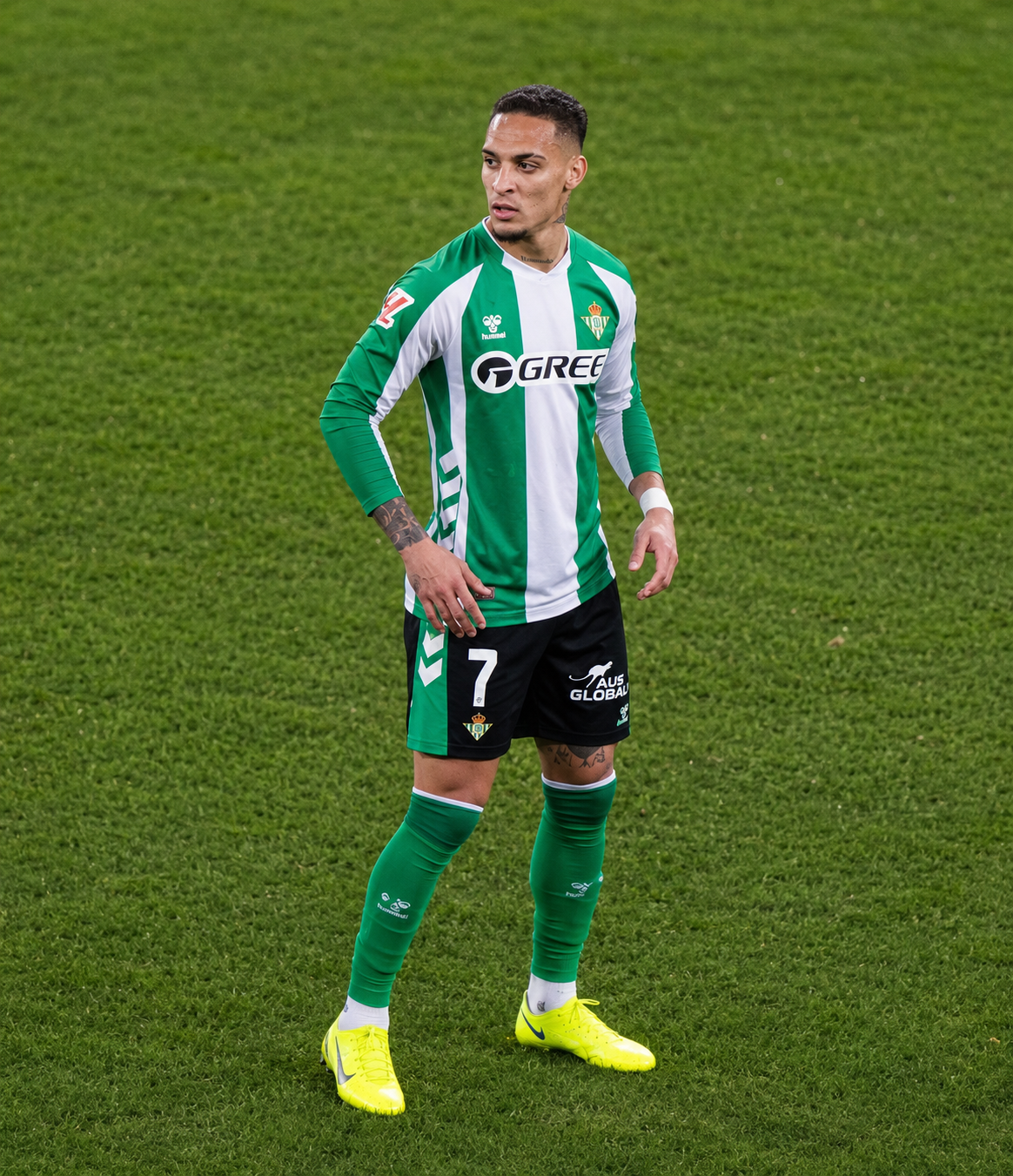
Antony with Betis in 2025

On 25 January 2025, Antony was loaned out to La Liga club Real Betis until the end of the 2024–25 season. He made his debut for the club on 2 February, in a 2–2 draw with Athletic Bilbao, creating Betis' first goal, being named man of the match. Seven days later, Antony scored his first goals for Betis, and was named man of the match in a 3–2 loss to Celta Vigo. His form led him to be nominated for the La Liga Player of the Month award. On 23 February, in a league match against Getafe, Antony was sent off for a challenge on Juan Iglesias. However, three days later, the red card was overturned by the Royal Spanish Football Federation, following a successful claim of wrongful dismissal. After the red card was overturned, Betis then won their next match 2–1 against Real Madrid. On 8 May, he scored the opening goal and assisted an extra time goal in a 4–3 aggregate victory over Fiorentina, to help Betis reach their first ever European final.

In May 2025, Manchester United put Antony and several other players on the transfer list ahead of the 2025–26 season. Later that month, Antony announced his departure from Real Betis via social media, concluding a six-month loan spell with the club.

He ended the season with 14 goal contributions in all competitions for Betis, helping the team qualify for the UEFA Europa League and leading the media to label his time there as a "career revival".

==== Permanent move ====
On 1 September 2025, Antony completed a permanent transfer to Real Betis from Manchester United. On 24 September, Antony provided a goal and a last-minute equaliser assist in the UEFA Europa League against Nottingham Forest, winning the player of the match award. On 18 October, Antony scored his first league goals since his permanent move when he scored a brace in a 2–2 draw at Villarreal. On 2 November 2025, Antony scored 2 goals and provided 1 assist against Mallorca, winning the Man of the Match award. On 6 November 2025, Antony scored against Lyon in the Europa League.

On 27 November, Antony provided an assist against Utrecht in the Europa League. On 3 December, Antony provided an assist against Torrent. On 6 December, Antony scored the opening goal in a 5–3 loss to Barcelona. On 11 December, Antony scored the final goal in a 3–1 win against Dinamo Zagreb in the UEFA Europe League. On 21 December, Antony provided an assist and created another goal by hitting the post so his teammate could tap in the equaliser against Getafe.

On 10 January 2026, Antony provided a late assist to tie the game against Oviedo. On 17 January, Antony provided an assist in a 2–0 win against Villarreal. On 29 January, Antony scored a long-range effort and provided an assist in a 2–1 win against Feyenoord, securing automatic qualification for Real Betis into the round of 16 of the UEFA Europa League. On 8 February, Antony scored the winning goal in a 1–0 win against Atlético Madrid, with a long-range effort. On 15 February, Antony provided an assist and created another goal as his shot was rebounded off the goalkeeper so his teammate could tap in the winning goal. On 1 March 2026, Antony scored the opening goal with a bicycle kick in the Seville derby.

== International career ==
=== Youth career ===
On 15 May 2019, he was named in the Brazil under-23 squad for the 2019 Toulon Tournament, helping his team win the competition, scoring two goals, including one in the final against Japan.

On 17 June 2021, Antony was named in the Brazil under-23 squad for the 2020 Summer Olympics. He started in all of Brazil's six games at the tournament. In the final against Spain, he assisted Malcom's winning goal in extra-time as Brazil won the title.

=== Senior career ===
Antony made his debut for the Brazil national team on 7 October 2021 in a World Cup qualifier against Venezuela. He came on as a substitute in the 77th minute and scored a goal in added time to establish the final score of 3–1 for Brazil. On 7 November 2022, he was named in the squad for the 2022 FIFA World Cup.

On 4 September 2023, Antony was expelled from Brazil's squad for 2026 FIFA World Cup qualification matches against Bolivia and Peru following allegations of domestic violence against his ex-girlfriend.

On 26 May 2025, newly appointed Brazil manager Carlo Ancelotti announced the squad for World Cup qualifiers against Ecuador and Paraguay, including Antony, marking the player's return to the national team after a two-year absence.

== Public image ==
Antony's poor form, on-field antics and celebrations, combined with hefty pricetag, have resulted in internet memes. On 27 October 2022, he was taken off the pitch after performing a spin move against Sheriff Tiraspol. The move received heavy condemnation, with pundits and former players alike criticising it as "showboating". Having only scored a few goals in nearly two years of playing for United, he began receiving backlash for his poor performances. On 12 May 2024, as Antony was brought onto the pitch against Arsenal in the 70th minute, he was pictured raising his eyebrows on the touchline in a dramatic manner. After United defeated Coventry City in the 2024 FA Cup semi-finals, Antony celebrated by cupping his ears at the Coventry players, which was also met with backlash. Antony also received severe backlash after scoring a penalty (his only goal of the season) against Barnsley in the FA Cup, before doing 7 different celebrations. Many fans have touted Antony as one of the worst signings in United's history due to his high price tag and lack of goals. However, having found form at Betis, critics and fans alike have both satirically and unsatirically praised him for his good performances.

== Personal life ==
Antony is of Portuguese descent. On 16 September 2024, he got engaged to his girlfriend Rosilene Silva.

=== Domestic violence allegations ===
On 4 September 2023, Antony was excluded from Brazil's squad for 2026 FIFA World Cup qualification matches against Bolivia and Peru following allegations of domestic violence against his ex-girlfriend, with Brazilian media outlet UOL reporting the existence of photos showing the ex-girlfriend having injuries to her head and her hand as the Greater Manchester Police begin to investigate the case. Amidst two other women also stepping up to accuse Antony of assault, he went on to deny the allegations on Brazilian network SBT on 9 September, claiming that he will "provide the proof and people will understand". On 10 September, Manchester United issued a club statement acknowledging the allegations and announcing that an agreement with him was in place to grant him an extended leave of absence following the international break as he dealt with the situation. He returned to Manchester United training on 29 September 2023.

== Career statistics ==
=== Club ===
As of match played 21 November 2026

Appearances and goals by club, season and competition
Club	Season	League			State league (Note: Includes Campeonato Paulista)		National cup (Note: Includes Copa do Brasil, KNVB Cup, FA Cup, Copa del Rey)		League cup (Note: Includes EFL Cup)		Continental		Other		Total	
Club	Season	Division	Apps	Goals	Apps	Goals	Apps	Goals	Apps	Goals	Apps	Goals	Apps	Goals	Apps	Goals
São Paulo	2018	Série A	3	0	0	0	0	0	—		0	0	—		3	0
São Paulo	2019	Série A	29	4	14	2	1	0	—		1 (Note: Appearance(s) in Copa Libertadores)	0	—		45	6
São Paulo	2020	Série A	0	0	2	0	0	0	—		2	0	—		4	0
São Paulo	Total		32	4	16	2	1	0	—		3	0	—		52	6
Ajax	2020–21	Eredivisie	32	9	—		4	1	—		10 (Note: Four appearances and one goal in UEFA Champions League, six appearances in UEFA Europa League)	1	—		46	11
Ajax	2021–22	Eredivisie	23	8	—		3	2	—		7 (Note: Appearances in UEFA Champions League)	2	0	0	33	12
Ajax	2022–23	Eredivisie	2	1	—		—		—		—		1 (Note: Appearance in Johan Cruyff Shield)	1	3	2
Ajax	Total		57	18	—		7	3	—		17	3	1	1	82	25
Manchester United	2022–23	Premier League	25	4	—		5	1	5	1	9 (Note: Appearances in UEFA Europa League)	2	—		44	8
Manchester United	2023–24	Premier League	29	1	—		4	2	1	0	4	0	—		38	3
Manchester United	2024–25	Premier League	8	0	—		0	0	2	1	4	0	0	0	14	1
Manchester United	Total		62	5	—		9	3	8	2	17	2	0	0	96	12
Real Betis (loan)	2024–25	La Liga	17	5	—		—		—		9 (Note: Appearances in UEFA Conference League)	4	—		26	9
Real Betis	2025–26	La Liga	32	8	—		4	0	—		10	6	—		46	14
Real Betis	2026–27	La Liga	12	1	—		1	0	—		4	0	—		17	1
Real Betis	Betis total		61	14	—		5	0	—		23	10	—		89	24
Career total			212	41	16	2	22	6	8	2	60	15	1	1	319	67

=== International ===
As of match played 25 March 2023

Appearances and goals by national team and year
National team	Year	Apps	Goals
Brazil	2021	5	1
Brazil	2022	10	1
Brazil	2023	1	0
Total		16	2

Scores and results list Brazil's goal tally first, score column indicates score after each Antony goal.

List of international goals scored by Antony
No.	Date	Venue	Cap	Opponent	Score	Result	Competition
1	7 October 2021	Estadio Olímpico de la UCV, Caracas, Venezuela	1	Venezuela	3–1	3–1	2022 FIFA World Cup qualification
2	1 February 2022	Estádio Mineirão, Belo Horizonte, Brazil	7	Paraguay	3–0	4–0	2022 FIFA World Cup qualification

== Honours ==
Ajax

- Eredivisie: 2020–21, 2021–22
- KNVB Cup: 2020–21

Manchester United

- FA Cup: 2023–24
- EFL Cup: 2022–23
- UEFA Europa League runner-up: 2024–25

Real Betis

- UEFA Conference League runner-up: 2024–25

Brazil U23

- Summer Olympics: 2020
- Toulon Tournament: 2019

Individual

- Eredivisie Player of the Month: December 2020
- Eredivisie Talent of the Month: December 2021
- Eredivisie Team of the Season: 2021–22
- Manchester United Goal of the Season: 2022–23
- UEFA Europa League Team of the Season: 2025–26
