= Lisandro Martínez =

Argentine footballer (born 1998)

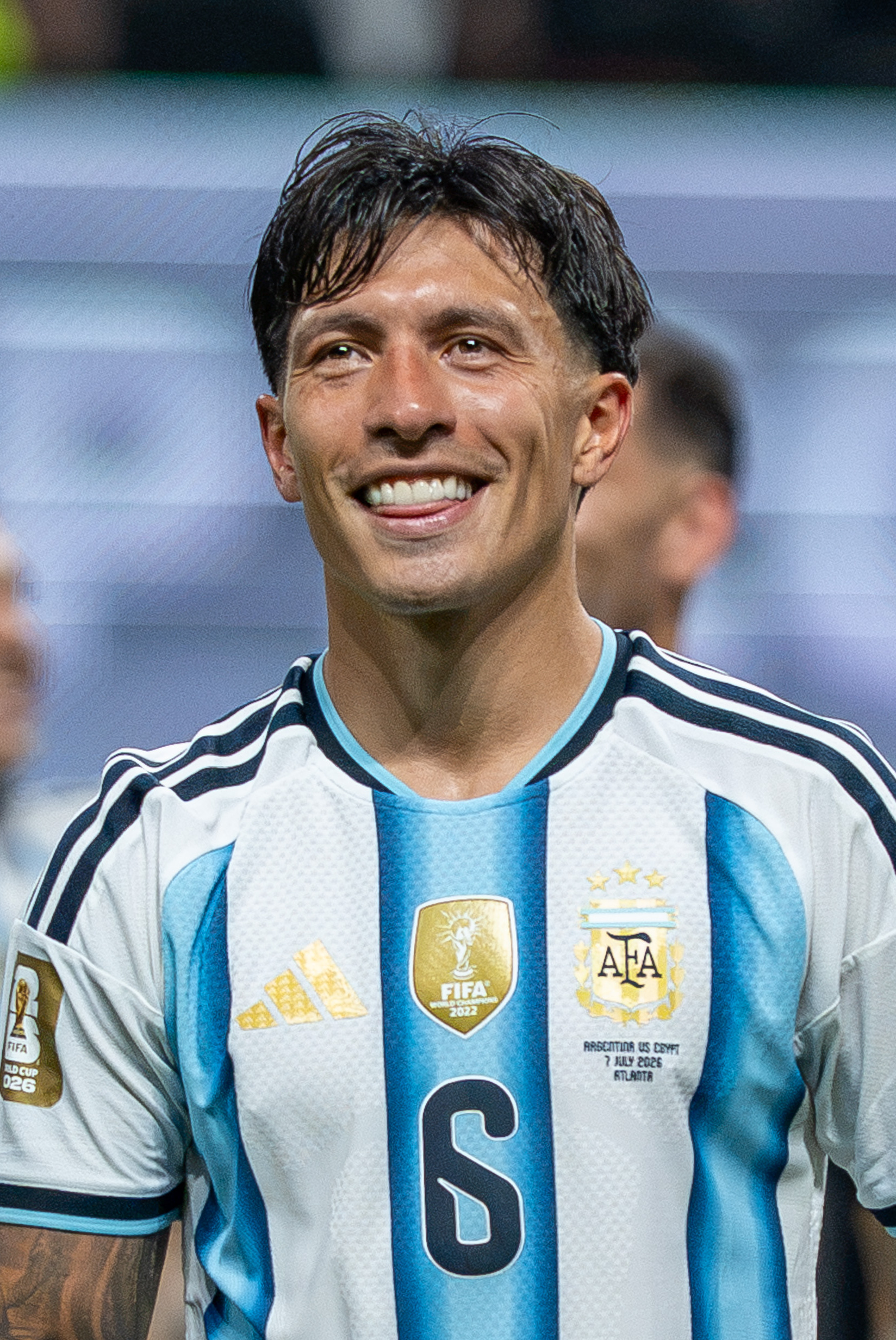
- Martínez with Argentina in 2026

Personal information
- Full name: Lisandro Martínez
- Date of birth: 18 January 1998 (age 28)
- Place of birth: Gualeguay, Argentina
- Height: 1.75 m (5 ft 9 in)
- Position: Centre-back

Team information
- Current team: Manchester United
- Number: 6

Youth career
- 2002–2006: Club Urquiza
- 2006–2014: Club Libertad
- 2014–2017: Newell's Old Boys

Senior career*
| Years | Team | Apps | (Gls) |
| 2017–2018 | Newell's Old Boys | 1 | (0) |
| 2017–2018 | → Defensa y Justicia (loan) | 21 | (1) |
| 2018–2019 | Defensa y Justicia | 25 | (2) |
| 2019–2022 | Ajax | 74 | (6) |
| 2022– | Manchester United | 85 | (3) |

International career^{‡}
| 2016–2017 | Argentina U20 | 8 | (0) |
| 2019 | Argentina U23 | 2 | (0) |
| 2019– | Argentina | 40 | (2) |
Medal record
Men's football
Representing Argentina
FIFA World Cup
| Winner | 2022 Qatar |
| Runner-up | 2026 Canada–Mexico–US |
Copa América
| Winner | 2021 Brazil |
| Winner | 2024 United States |
CONMEBOL–UEFA Cup of Champions
| Winner | 2022 England |
- * Club domestic league appearances and goals as of 21:01, 22 November 2026 (UTC) ‡ National team caps and goals as of 21:31, 18 November 2026 (UTC)

Lisandro "Licha" Martínez (Spanish pronunciation: [liˈsandɾo maɾˈtines]; born 18 January 1998) is an Argentine professional footballer who plays as a centre-back for Premier League club Manchester United and the Argentina national team. Nicknamed "The Butcher", he is known for his aggressive style of play, physical duels, and accurate long passes from the back.

Martínez began his career at Newell's Old Boys before joining Defensa y Justicia in 2017, initially on loan. He signed for Ajax in 2019, where he made 120 appearances over three seasons and won two Eredivisie titles and one KNVB Cup. He won the Ajax Player of the Year award in the 2021–22 season.

Martínez played youth international football for Argentina at under-20 and under-23 levels. He made his senior international debut in March 2019, and was a member of the Argentina squads that won the 2021 Copa América, the 2022 Finalissima, the 2022 FIFA World Cup, and the 2024 Copa América.

== Club career ==
=== Newell's Old Boys ===
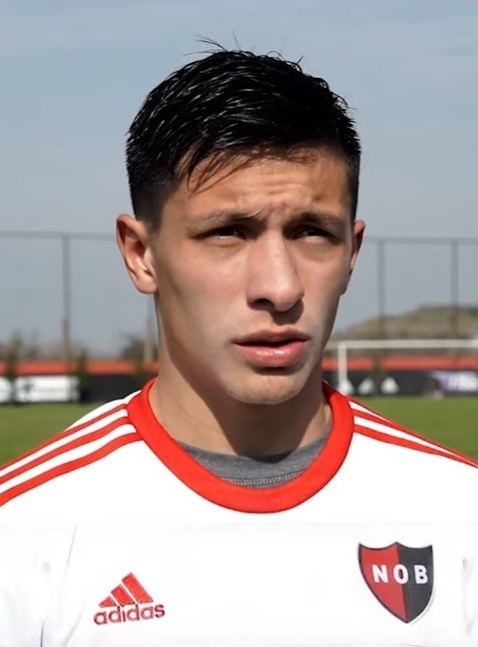
Martínez with Newell's Old Boys in 2016

Born in Gualeguay, Entre Ríos Province, Martínez had youth spells with Club Urquiza (Gualeguay, Entre Rios), Club Libertad (Gualeguay, Entre Rios) and Newell's Old Boys. He made his professional debut for Newell's in the club's final fixture of the 2016–17 season, when he played the full match in a loss to Godoy Cruz.

=== Defensa y Justicia ===
In August 2017, Martínez joined fellow Argentine Primera División side Defensa y Justicia on loan. His first appearance for Defensa arrived on 13 October in a defeat against San Lorenzo. Two appearances later, he scored his first senior goal in an away win versus Temperley. Defensa y Justicia purchased 50% of the rights to Martínez in June 2018.

=== Ajax ===
On 17 May 2019, Defensa y Justicia announced that a deal had been agreed with Eredivisie team Ajax; subject to the passing of a medical. Ajax paid the Argentine side €7m for the transfer of Martínez. Ajax announced the completion of the medical on 20 May, with the transfer to go through on 1 July. He penned a four-year contract, with the option of a further year. He didn't officially join until July, though did feature in June friendlies with Quick '20 and AaB. Before Ajax signed him, they tracked his progress for two and a half years. His competitive bow came in the 2019 Johan Cruyff Shield against PSV Eindhoven, as Ajax won the trophy following a two-goal victory. He was voted man of the match in his second Eredivisie game, a win over Emmen.

Martínez netted his first Ajax goal on 28 September, as he opened the scoring in a 2–0 victory over Groningen at the Johan Cruyff Arena. He scored again against Utrecht in November, in a campaign which was ended prematurely due to the COVID-19 pandemic. In his first match of 2020–21, Martínez got his third Ajax goal in a home win versus RKC Waalwijk on 20 September.

=== Manchester United ===
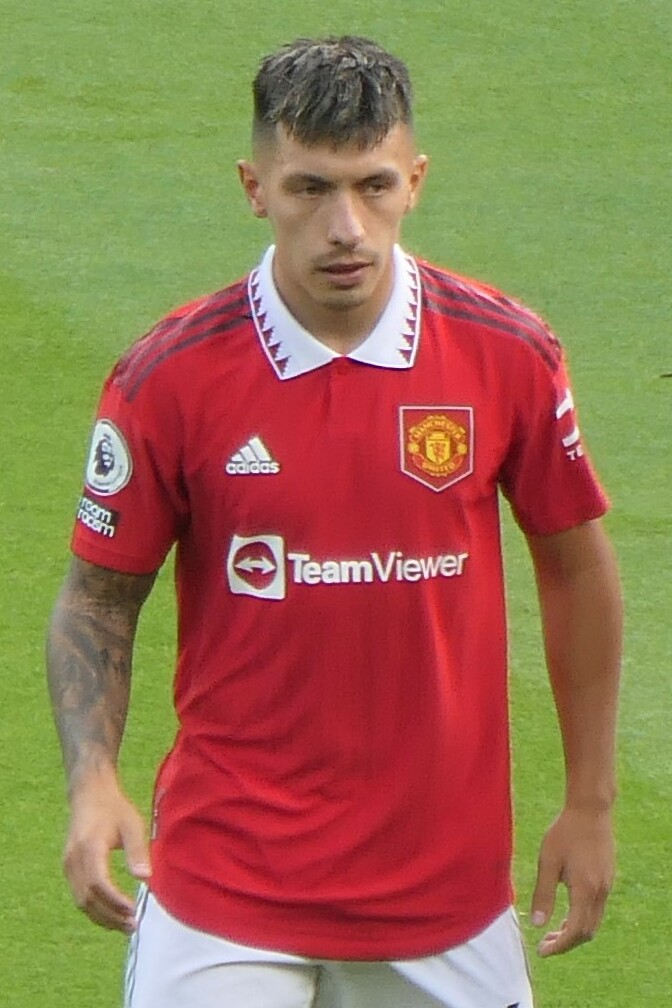
Martínez with Manchester United in 2022

On 16 July 2022, it was announced that Manchester United had agreed a deal with Ajax for the signing of Martínez for a reported transfer fee between £47 million to £49 million, plus £8.5 million in add-ons. The transfer was officially completed on 27 July, when Martínez signed a five-year contract with the club. The next day, it was confirmed that he would wear the number six shirt last worn by Paul Pogba. On 7 August, Martínez made his club debut in a 2–1 home loss against Brighton & Hove Albion in the Premier League. However, after performances against rivals Liverpool and Southampton, he received the Manchester United Player of the Month award for August.

On 22 January 2023, Martínez scored his first goal for Manchester United in a 3–2 defeat against Arsenal at the Emirates Stadium. His first trophy with the club came on 26 February, with a win over Newcastle United in the 2023 EFL Cup final. On 13 April, Martínez injured his right foot while playing in the first leg of the Europa League quarter-final against Sevilla. The following day, it was confirmed that he fractured the fifth metatarsal bone in his right foot and would miss the remainder of the season.

"Lisandro Martínez is top 5 centre-backs in the world. He made the difference on this game by playing passes through our defence."

— Manchester City manager Pep Guardiola, praising Martínez following United's 2–1 win in the 2024 FA Cup Final

On 29 September, Martínez reinjured his foot, and was sidelined for four months, returning on 14 January 2024 as a substitute in Manchester United's 2–2 draw against Tottenham Hotspur. On 4 February, in a match against West Ham United, he was substituted in the 71st minute after a collision with West Ham defender Vladimír Coufal. It was then confirmed that he had sustained an MCL injury, and was expected to be out for at least eight weeks. He returned on 25 May in the 2024 FA Cup final against local rivals Manchester City, where United triumphed with a 2–1 victory. On 5 January 2025, Martínez scored the opening goal in a 2–2 draw against Liverpool at Anfield. He became the first Manchester United player to score at their rivals' ground since Jesse Lingard in 2018, ending a drought of five league visits to Anfield without a goal. On 26 January, Martínez's deflected shot handed United a 1–0 victory over Fulham at Craven Cottage. A week later, on 2 February, he sustained an ACL injury during a match against Crystal Palace, which would sideline him for the rest of the season.

On 13 April 2026, Martinez received a straight red card for pulling the hair of Dominic Calvert-Lewin in their 2–1 home defeat to Leeds United and was suspended for three games.

On 31 October 2026, Martinez gave away a penalty and got a red card after receiving his second booking for a foul on Wesley Fofana, with the game against Chelsea ending in a 2-0 defeat.

== International career ==
Martínez was capped eight times for Argentina at under-20 level. He played four times at the 2017 South American Youth Football Championship in Ecuador, with the first coming against Venezuela during the first stage. Argentina finished in fourth place and subsequently qualified for the 2017 FIFA U-20 World Cup in South Korea. He was called up to the U-20 World Cup squad, but failed to make an appearance, appearing on the substitutes bench once against Guinea. Martínez made two appearances for Argentina at under-23 level, making his debut in a 5–0 friendly victory against Bolivia in September 2019.

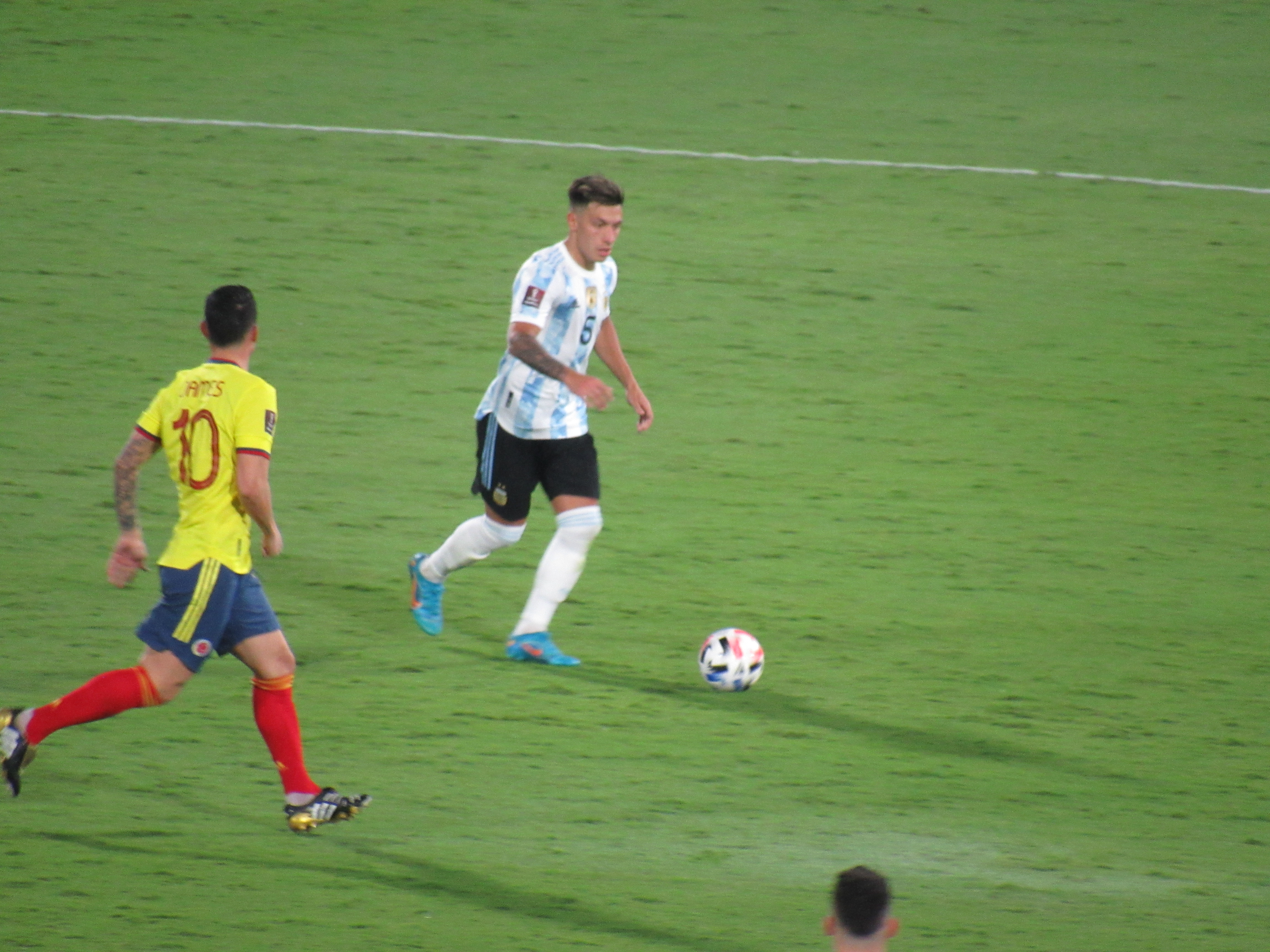
Martínez with Argentina in 2022

In March 2019, Martínez received his first call-up to the senior Argentina national team. He debuted against Venezuela on 22 March in Madrid. Martínez made one appearance at the 2021 Copa América, which Argentina won. He was an unused substitute in Argentina's 3–0 victory over Italy in the 2022 Finalissima. At the 2022 FIFA World Cup, Martinez came off the bench against Australia in the round of 16, making an important block on a shot by Aziz Behich. Martinez was part of the starting XI against Netherlands in the quarter-finals and came off the bench against Croatia in the semis. In the final against title-holders France, he was an unused substitute as Argentina won 4–2 on penalties to win their third World Cup title.

On 15 June 2024, he was selected in the 26-man squad for the 2024 Copa América. He scored his first international goal, putting his team ahead in a 1–1 draw against Ecuador in the quarter-finals of the tournament, which ended with a victory in the penalty shootout.

Martinez playing for Argentina at the 2026 FIFA World Cup

Martínez was selected in Argentina's 26-man squad for the 2026 FIFA World Cup. He scored his first World Cup goal and provided an assist in a 3–2 extra-time victory over Cape Verde in the Round of 32. On 7 July, in the round of 16 against Egypt, Mostafa Ziko had a goal controversially disallowed by referee François Letexier following a VAR review; the referee ruled that Marwan Attia had fouled Lisandro Martínez in the buildup by stepping on his foot, disallowing the resulting goal. Critics noted the incident occurred several seconds before the goal and far from the scoring action, though the decision was technically grounded in the IFAB rules governing the VAR protocol. Argentina came from behind, after initially going down 2–0, to win the match 3–2 late on. On 15 July, after Argentina's 2–1 victory over England in the 2026 FIFA World Cup semifinals, Martínez was one of several Argentina players who held up a banner saying "Las Malvinas son Argentinas" (The Falklands are Argentine). Following the match, Martínez said "I don't know if there might be sanctions or not, but what they did was display that banner and assert that the islands belong to us". In the final against Spain, he started the match but was forced off with an injury in the first half as Argentina lost 1–0 after extra time.

== Style of play ==
Martinez plays primarily a centre-back, though he is capable of playing at left-back and as a defensive-midfielder, having played there at times for Defensa y Justicia and Ajax. He is a ball-playing centre-back and is known for his range of passing and composure on the ball. In the 2021–22 Eredivisie season, he averaged more passes per 90 minutes than any other player. Before signing him, Ajax's scouts characterised Martínez as a left-footed ball-playing defender who is "tough as nails" and possesses winning mentality. At Manchester United, his performances earned him comparisons to legendary former United defender Nemanja Vidić, with Vidic himself praising Martínez for his aggressive defending and leadership. Despite his relatively short stature for a defender, standing at 5'9", he is also effective in duels.

== Career statistics ==
=== Club ===
As of match played 22 November 2026

Appearances and goals by club, season and competition
| Club | Season | League | | | National cup (Note: Includes Copa Argentina, KNVB Cup, FA Cup) | | League cup (Note: Includes Copa de la Superliga, EFL Cup) | | Continental | | Other | | Total | |
| Club | Season | Division | Apps | Goals | Apps | Goals | Apps | Goals | Apps | Goals | Apps | Goals | Apps | Goals |
|---|---|---|---|---|---|---|---|---|---|---|---|---|---|---|
| Newell's Old Boys | 2016–17 | Argentine Primera División | 1 | 0 | 0 | 0 | — | | — | | — | | 1 | 0 |
| Newell's Old Boys | 2017–18 | Argentine Primera División | 0 | 0 | 0 | 0 | — | | 0 | 0 | — | | 0 | 0 |
| Newell's Old Boys | Total | | 1 | 0 | 0 | 0 | — | | 0 | 0 | — | | 1 | 0 |
| Defensa y Justicia (loan) | 2017–18 | Argentine Primera División | 21 | 1 | 1 | 0 | — | | 2 (Note: Appearances in Copa Sudamericana) | 0 | — | | 24 | 1 |
| Defensa y Justicia | 2018–19 | Argentine Primera División | 25 | 2 | 0 | 0 | 2 | 0 | 7 | 0 | — | | 34 | 2 |
| Defensa y Justicia | Total | | 46 | 3 | 1 | 0 | 2 | 0 | 9 | 0 | — | | 58 | 3 |
| Ajax | 2019–20 | Eredivisie | 24 | 2 | 4 | 0 | — | | 12 (Note: Ten appearances in UEFA Champions League, two appearances in UEFA Europa League) | 0 | 1 (Note: Appearance in Johan Cruyff Shield) | 0 | 41 | 2 |
| Ajax | 2020–21 | Eredivisie | 26 | 3 | 5 | 0 | — | | 11 (Note: Five appearances in UEFA Champions League, six appearances in UEFA Europa League) | 0 | 0 | 0 | 42 | 3 |
| Ajax | 2021–22 | Eredivisie | 24 | 1 | 4 | 0 | — | | 8 (Note: Appearance(s) in UEFA Champions League) | 0 | 1 | 0 | 37 | 1 |
| Ajax | Total | | 74 | 6 | 13 | 0 | — | | 31 | 0 | 2 | 0 | 120 | 6 |
| Manchester United | 2022–23 | Premier League | 27 | 1 | 3 | 0 | 5 | 0 | 10 (Note: Appearances in UEFA Europa League) | 0 | — | | 45 | 1 |
| Manchester United | 2023–24 | Premier League | 11 | 0 | 2 | 0 | 0 | 0 | 1 | 0 | — | | 14 | 0 |
| Manchester United | 2024–25 | Premier League | 20 | 2 | 1 | 0 | 2 | 0 | 8 | 0 | 1 (Note: Appearance in FA Community Shield) | 0 | 32 | 2 |
| Manchester United | 2025–26 | Premier League | 18 | 0 | 1 | 0 | 0 | 0 | — | | — | | 19 | 0 |
| Manchester United | 2026–27 | Premier League | 9 | 0 | 0 | 0 | 0 | 0 | 3 | 1 | — | | 12 | 1 |
| Manchester United | Total | | 85 | 3 | 7 | 0 | 7 | 0 | 22 | 1 | 1 | 0 | 122 | 4 |
| Career total | | | 206 | 12 | 21 | 0 | 9 | 0 | 62 | 1 | 3 | 0 | 301 | 13 |

=== International ===
As of match played 17 November 2026

Appearances and goals by national team and year
| National team | Year | Apps | Goals |
|---|---|---|---|
| Argentina | 2019 | 1 | 0 |
| Argentina | 2021 | 3 | 0 |
| Argentina | 2022 | 11 | 0 |
| Argentina | 2023 | 1 | 0 |
| Argentina | 2024 | 10 | 1 |
| Argentina | 2025 | 0 | 0 |
| Argentina | 2026 | 14 | 1 |
| Total | | 40 | 2 |

Scores and results list Argentina's goal tally first, score column indicates score after each Martínez goal.

List of international goals scored by Lisandro Martínez
| No. | Date | Venue | Cap | Opponent | Score | Result | Competition |
|---|---|---|---|---|---|---|---|
| 1 | 4 July 2024 | NRG Stadium, Houston, United States | 21 | Ecuador | 1–0 | 1–1 (4–2 p) | 2024 Copa América |
| 2 | 3 July 2026 | Hard Rock Stadium, Miami Gardens, United States | 31 | Cape Verde | 2–1 | 3–2 (a.e.t.) | 2026 FIFA World Cup |

== Honours ==
Ajax

- Eredivisie: 2020–21, 2021–22
- KNVB Cup: 2020–21
- Johan Cruyff Shield: 2019

Manchester United

- FA Cup: 2023–24
- EFL Cup: 2022–23

Argentina

- FIFA World Cup: 2022
- Copa América: 2021, 2024
- CONMEBOL–UEFA Cup of Champions: 2022

Individual

- Ajax Player of the Year (Rinus Michels Award): 2021–22
- Eredivisie Team of the Month: April 2021, February 2022
- FIFA World Cup Dream XI: 2026
