= Edmond Lupancu =

Australian soccer player

Personal information
- Full name: Edmond Lupancu
- Place of birth: Australia
- Positions: Centre-back; left back

Youth career
- –2018: South Melbourne
- 2018–2021: Melbourne Victory

Senior career*
Years	Team	Apps	(Gls)
2021–2022	Melbourne Victory NPL	21	(0)
2021–2022	Melbourne Victory	0	(0)
2023–2024	Western Sydney Wanderers NPL	15	(1)
2024–2025	Avondale FC U-23	10	(0)
2025	Melbourne Srbija		
- * Club domestic league appearances and goals as of 25 May 2024

Edmond Lupancu, is an Australian professional footballer who plays as a central defender.

== Club career ==
He made his professional debut for Melbourne Victory in a FFA Cup playoff match against Perth Glory on 24 November 2021.

== Personal life ==
Lupancu is of Romanian descent.
