= 2023 EFL Cup final =

Final of the 2022–23 EFL Cup

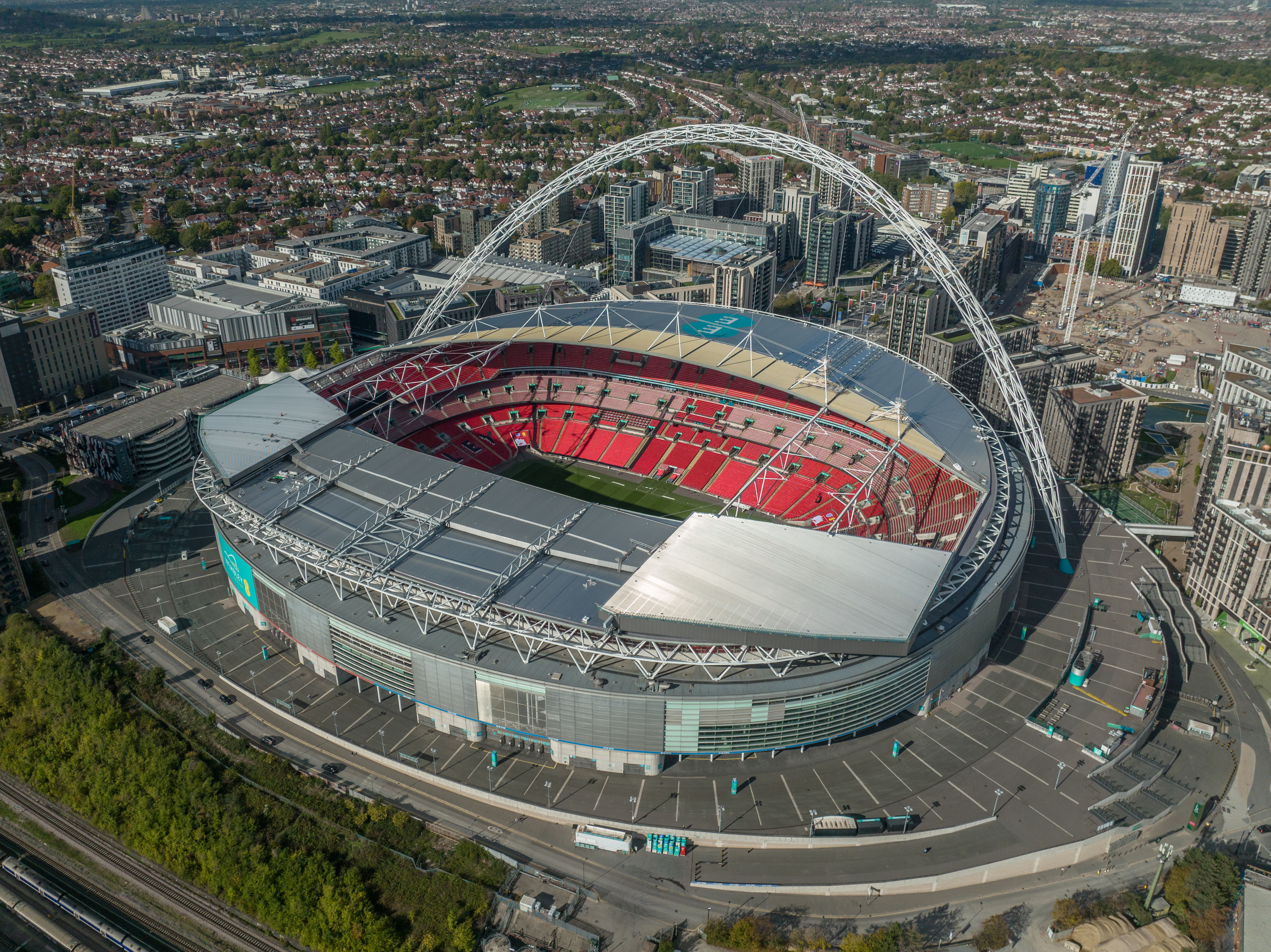
- Wembley Stadium hosted the match
- Event: 2022–23 EFL Cup
Manchester United	Newcastle United
2	0
- Date: 26 February 2023
- Venue: Wembley Stadium, London
- Man of the Match: Casemiro (Manchester United)
- Referee: David Coote (Nottinghamshire)
- Attendance: 87,306

The 2023 EFL Cup final was the final of the 2022–23 EFL Cup. It was played between Manchester United and Newcastle United at Wembley Stadium in London on 26 February 2023. This was Newcastle's first final since the 1999 FA Cup final, in which Manchester United defeated them 2–0.

Newcastle were aiming to end one of the longest trophy droughts in English football, with their last major honour being the 1968–69 Inter-Cities Fairs Cup. However, the scoreline from 1999 was repeated, as Manchester United won their first competitive trophy since 2017. Defeat meant Newcastle had lost five cup finals in a row, and their winless run at Wembley extended to 11 games, stretching back to their last win in 1955. It also meant they still had not scored in a cup final since the 1976 Football League Cup final. This proved to be the last game of these runs, with Newcastle returning to win the 2024-25 EFL Cup.

Both clubs were allocated 867 tickets in safe standing areas of Wembley, making this the first major domestic English men's final in nearly 35 years to allow supporters to stand. On the morning of the final, the Met Police estimated at least 100,000 Newcastle United fans, with and without tickets, were in and around Wembley.

== Route to the final ==
=== Manchester United ===
Round	Opposition	Score
3	Aston Villa (H)	4–2
4	Burnley (H)	2–0
QF	Charlton Athletic (H)	3–0
SF	Nottingham Forest (A)	3–0
SF	Nottingham Forest (H)	2–0
Key: (H) = Home; (A) = Away

As a Premier League club involved in the 2022–23 UEFA Europa League, Manchester United received a bye into the third round where they were drawn at home to fellow Premier League club Aston Villa with the match played at Old Trafford on 10 November. Manchester United won 4–2 with goals from Anthony Martial, Marcus Rashford, Bruno Fernandes and Scott McTominay, while the two goals for Villa came from Ollie Watkins and an own goal by Diogo Dalot. In the fourth round, Manchester United were drawn at home again to EFL Championship club Burnley, who were managed by former Manchester City player Vincent Kompany, with the match played on 21 December. Manchester United won 2–0 with goals from Christian Eriksen and Rashford. In the quarter-finals, Manchester United were drawn at home to EFL League One club Charlton Athletic with the match played on 10 January 2023. United won 3–0 with goals from Antony and two from Rashford. In the semi-final, which was played over two legs, United were drawn against Nottingham Forest with the first-leg away at the City Ground on 25 January. United took a 3–0 lead with goals from Rashford, Wout Weghorst and Fernandes. The reverse fixture was played at Old Trafford on 1 February, with Manchester United winning 2–0 (5–0 on aggregate) with goals from Martial and Fred.

=== Newcastle United ===
Round	Opposition	Score
2	Tranmere Rovers (A)	2–1
3	Crystal Palace (H)	0–0 (3–2 p.)
4	Bournemouth (H)	1–0
QF	Leicester City (H)	2–0
SF	Southampton (A)	1–0
SF	Southampton (H)	2–1
Key: (H) = Home; (A) = Away

As a Premier League club not involved in any UEFA competitions, Newcastle United entered the cup in the second round where they were drawn away to EFL League Two club Tranmere Rovers, with the match played at Prenton Park on 24 August 2022. Newcastle won 2–1 with goals from club captain Jamaal Lascelles and Chris Wood, after Elliott Nevitt had given Tranmere the lead. In the third round, they were drawn at home to fellow Premier League club Crystal Palace, with the match played at St James' Park on 9 November. The tie ended as a 0–0 draw after 90 minutes, so a penalty shoot-out was used to determine the outcome, with Newcastle winning 3–2 as Wood, Kieran Trippier and Joelinton converted their penalties for the home side, while Sven Botman and Bruno Guimarães missed theirs. Will Hughes and Joel Ward converted their penalties for Palace, with club captain Luka Milivojević, Jean-Philippe Mateta and Malcolm Ebiowei all having theirs saved by Nick Pope. In the fourth round, Newcastle were drawn at home once more to another Premier League club in Bournemouth, with the match played on 20 December. Newcastle won 1–0 with an own goal from Adam Smith. The match saw Newcastle manager Eddie Howe face his former club. In the quarter-finals, Newcastle were drawn at home for the third consecutive round against Leicester City, with the match played on 10 January 2023. Newcastle won 2–0 with goals from Dan Burn and Joelinton. In the semi-finals, which were played over two legs, Newcastle were drawn against Southampton, who had eliminated Manchester City in the previous round, with the first-leg played away at St Mary's Stadium on 24 January. Newcastle took a 1–0 lead in the tie with a goal from Joelinton. The second leg was played at St James' Park on 31 January, with Newcastle winning 2–1 (3–1 on aggregate) with two goals from Sean Longstaff and a consolation goal for Southampton from Ché Adams. On 18 February, Newcastle goalkeeper Pope was sent off in a Premier League match against Liverpool, a 2–0 defeat at St. James' Park, meaning he would miss the final. Back-up goalkeeper Martin Dúbravka was cup-tied due to appearing for the final opponents on loan in the earlier rounds, leaving third-choice Loris Karius to make his club debut in the showpiece.

== Match ==
=== Details ===
26 February 2023
16:30 GMT

Manchester United	2–0	Newcastle United
Casemiro 33'; Rashford 39'	Report

Wembley Stadium, London
Attendance: 87,306
Referee: David Coote (Nottinghamshire)

Manchester United	Newcastle United

GK	1	(Spain) David de Gea	(yellow card) 84'
RB	20	(Portugal) Diogo Dalot	(yellow card) 9'	(substituted off) 46'
CB	19	(France) Raphaël Varane
CB	6	(Argentina) Lisandro Martínez	(yellow card) 90+6'
LB	23	(England) Luke Shaw	(yellow card) 90+1'
CM	18	(Brazil) Casemiro	(yellow card) 87'
CM	17	(Brazil) Fred	(yellow card) 37'	(substituted off) 69'
RW	21	(Brazil) Antony		(substituted off) 83'
AM	8	(Portugal) Bruno Fernandes (c)
LW	10	(England) Marcus Rashford		(substituted off) 88'
CF	27	(Netherlands) Wout Weghorst		(substituted off) 69'
Substitutes:
GK	22	(England) Tom Heaton
DF	2	(Sweden) Victor Lindelöf
DF	5	(England) Harry Maguire		(substituted on) 88'
DF	12	(Netherlands) Tyrell Malacia
DF	29	(England) Aaron Wan-Bissaka		(substituted on) 46'
MF	15	(Austria) Marcel Sabitzer		(substituted on) 69'
MF	39	(Scotland) Scott McTominay		(substituted on) 69'
FW	25	(England) Jadon Sancho		(substituted on) 83'
FW	49	(Argentina) Alejandro Garnacho
Manager:
(Netherlands) Erik ten Hag

GK	18	(Germany) Loris Karius
RB	2	(England) Kieran Trippier (c)
CB	5	(Switzerland) Fabian Schär	(yellow card) 90+6'
CB	4	(Netherlands) Sven Botman	(yellow card) 67'
LB	33	(England) Dan Burn
DM	39	(Brazil) Bruno Guimarães		(substituted off) 78'
CM	36	(England) Sean Longstaff		(substituted off) 46'
CM	7	(Brazil) Joelinton	(yellow card) 45+6'
RW	24	(Paraguay) Miguel Almirón		(substituted off) 90+1'
LW	10	(France) Allan Saint-Maximin		(substituted off) 78'
CF	9	(England) Callum Wilson		(substituted off) 90+1'
Substitutes:
GK	29	(England) Mark Gillespie
DF	6	(England) Jamaal Lascelles
DF	11	(Scotland) Matt Ritchie		(substituted on) 90+1'
DF	13	(England) Matt Targett
DF	19	(Spain) Javier Manquillo
MF	23	(England) Jacob Murphy		(substituted on) 78'
MF	28	(England) Joe Willock		(substituted on) 78'
MF	32	(Scotland) Elliot Anderson		(substituted on) 90+1'
FW	14	(Sweden) Alexander Isak		(substituted on) 46'
Manager:
(England) Eddie Howe

Man of the Match:
Casemiro (Manchester United)

Assistant referees:
Nick Hopton (Derbyshire)
Tim Wood (Gloucestershire)
Fourth official:
Simon Hooper (Wiltshire)
Reserve assistant referee:
Nick Greenhalgh (Lancashire)
Video assistant referee:
Peter Bankes (Liverpool)
Assistant video assistant referee:
Eddie Smart (Birmingham)

Match rules

- 90 minutes
- 30 minutes of extra time if necessary
- Penalty shoot-out if scores still level
- Nine named substitutes
- Maximum of five substitutions, with a sixth allowed in extra time (Note: Each team was given only three opportunities to make substitutions, with a fourth opportunity in extra time, excluding substitutions made at half-time, before the start of extra time and at half-time in extra time.)
