= Ondřej Mastný =

Czech footballer (born 2002)

Personal information
- Date of birth: 8 March 2002 (age 24)
- Place of birth: Czech Republic
- Height: 1.88 m (6 ft 2 in)
- Position: Goalkeeper

Team information
- Current team: Příbram
- Number: 26

Youth career
- –2018: Jihlava
- 2018–: Manchester United

Senior career*
Years	Team	Apps	(Gls)
2020–2023	Manchester United	0	(0)
2023	→ Portadown (loan)	8	(0)
2023–	Vysočina Jihlava	11	(0)
2024	→ Příbram (loan)	13	(0)
2025–	Příbram	9	(0)
- * Club domestic league appearances and goals as of 15 June 2025

Ondřej Mastný (born 8 March 2002) is a Czech footballer who plays as a goalkeeper for Bohemian Football League club Příbram.

== Career ==
In 2018, Mastný joined the youth academy of English Premier League side Manchester United.

Mastný started in the 2020–21 EFL Trophy match against Rochdale on 29 September 2020. He kept a clean sheet and won the match on penalties.

On 30 January 2023, he was loaned out to Northern Irish club Portadown until June 2023.

On 15 August 2023, Mastný returned to Vysočina Jihlava, year before end of his contract with Manchester United. He signed a multi-year contract.

In August 2024, Mastný joined Bohemian Football League club Příbram on a loan deal.

== Career statistics ==
As of 30 January 2023

Appearances and goals by club, season and competition
Club	Season	League			National cup (Note: Includes FA Cup and Irish Cup)		League cup (Note: Includes EFL Cup and NIFL Cup)		Europe		Other		Total	
Club	Season	Division	Apps	Goals	Apps	Goals	Apps	Goals	Apps	Goals	Apps	Goals	Apps	Goals
Manchester United U21	2020–21	—	—		—		—		—		1 (Note: Appearance(s) in the EFL Trophy)	0	1	0
Manchester United U21	2021–22	—	—		—		—		—		0	0	0	0
Manchester United U21	2022–23	—	—		—		—		—		0	0	0	0
Manchester United U21	Total		—		—		—		—		1	0	1	0
Portadown (loan)	2022–23	NIFL Premiership	0	0	0	0	—		—		—		0	0
Career total			0	0	0	0	0	0	0	0	1	0	1	0
