= 2024–25 Manchester City F.C. season =

English football club season

Manchester City
2024–25 season
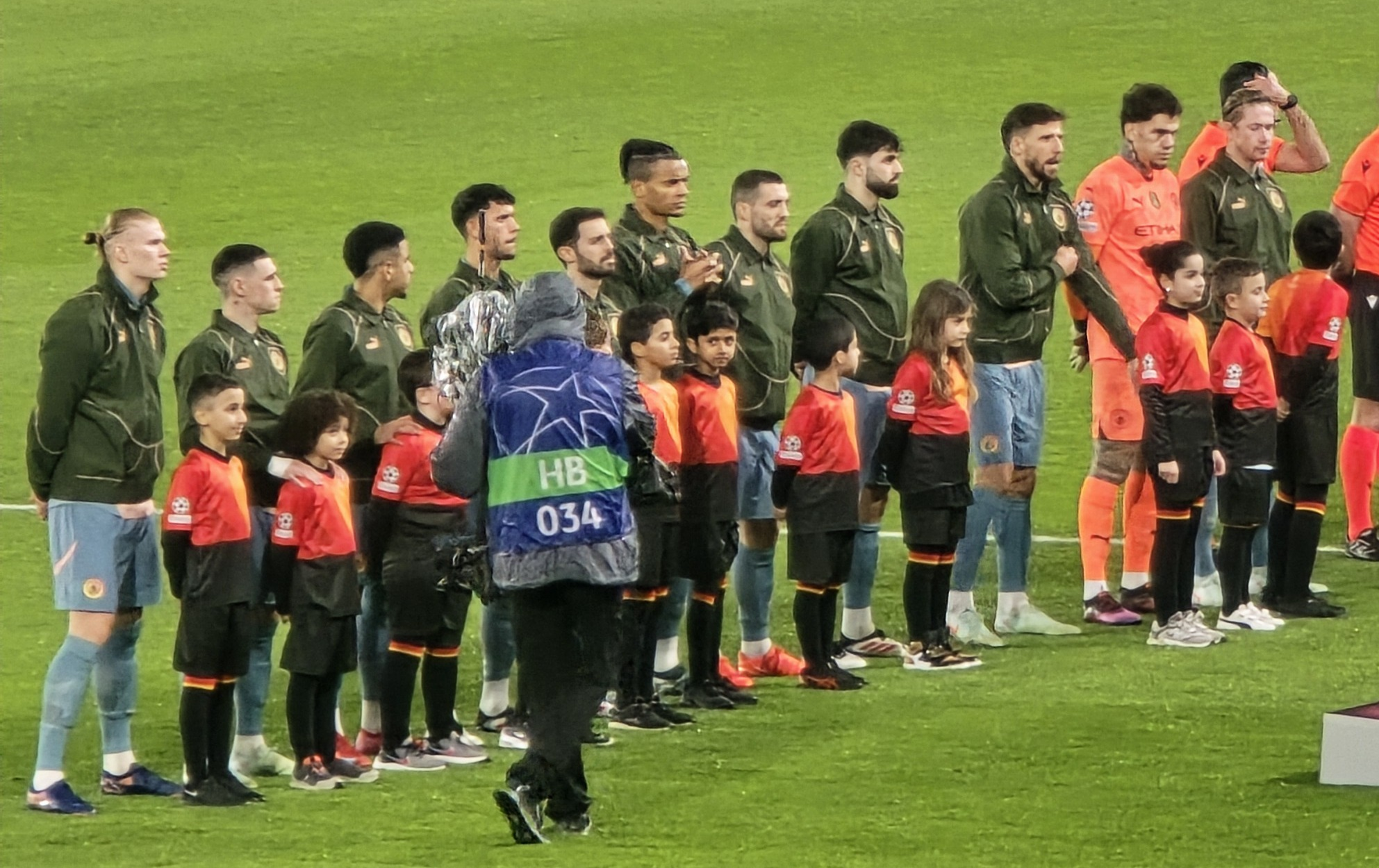
- Manchester City players lining up before an away match against Paris Saint-Germain, 22 January 2025
- Owner: City Football Group
- Chairman: Khaldoon Al Mubarak
- Manager: Pep Guardiola
- Stadium: City of Manchester Stadium
- Premier League: 3rd
- FA Cup: Runners-up
- EFL Cup: Fourth round
- FA Community Shield: Winners
- UEFA Champions League: Knockout phase play-offs
- FIFA Club World Cup: Round of 16
- Top goalscorer: League: Erling Haaland (22); All: Erling Haaland (34)
- Highest home attendance: 52,846 v Arsenal; 22 September 2024 (Premier League)
- Lowest home attendance: 40,584 v Watford; 24 September 2024 (EFL Cup)
- Average home league attendance: 52,519
- Biggest win: 8–0 v Salford City (Home); 11 January 2025 (FA Cup)
- Biggest defeat: 0–4 v Tottenham Hotspur (Home); 23 November 2024 (Premier League); 1–5 v Arsenal (Away); 2 February 2025 (Premier League)
| Home colours | Away colours | Third colours |

The 2024–25 season was the 130th season in the existence of Manchester City Football Club and their 23rd consecutive season in the top flight of English football. In addition to the domestic league, where they were competing as four-time defending champions, Manchester City also participated in the FA Cup, EFL Cup, FA Community Shield, the revamped UEFA Champions League; entering the latter for the 14th consecutive season; and the expanded FIFA Club World Cup as winners of the 2022–23 UEFA Champions League.

City began the season by defeating Manchester United 7–6 on penalties after a 1–1 draw in regular time on 10 August to win the FA Community Shield for the first time since 2019. This turned out to be their only honour of the season. On 30 October, they were eliminated in the fourth round of the EFL Cup by Tottenham Hotspur at their stadium in a 1–2 defeat, the team's first that season. This game marked the beginning of a recently unprecedented period of poor form for the team, which concluded at one win in thirteen matches, and included five consecutive losses for the first time in Pep Guardiola's managerial career and the worst run for City since the 2005–06 season.

On 19 February, Manchester City were eliminated from the Champions League by Real Madrid, losing 3–6 on aggregate after having been beaten home and away by the reigning champions in the new knockout phase play-offs. This is the first season since 2012–13 where City had failed to reach the last 16 of the competition. On 17 May, they were beaten 1–0 by Crystal Palace in the FA Cup final, City's second consecutive cup final defeat. Palace's victory was their first-ever major title and ensured the Blues failed to claim major domestic silverware for the first time since the 2016–17 season. A 2–0 victory away to Fulham on the final day of the Premier League season ensured City secured third place in the standings and qualified for the following season's Champions League, their 15th consecutive appearance in the competition.

After the end of the season proper, the club embarked on significant transfer activity, recruiting players such as Rayan Aït-Nouri, Tijjani Reijnders, and Rayan Cherki, before travelling to the United States for the newly expanded Club World Cup. On June 30, the Blues were beaten 4–3 after extra time by Al-Hilal in the round of 16 after having swept their group stage opponents.

== Kits ==
Supplier: Puma / Sponsor: Etihad Airways (Front) / OKX (Sleeves)

| Home | Home alt. | Away | Third | Fourth | Club World Cup home (2025–26 home) | Club World Cup home alt. (2025–26 home alt.) | Club World Cup away (special) |
| Goalkeeper 1 | Goalkeeper 2 | Goalkeeper 3 |

== Season summary ==
=== Pre-season ===
The club ended the previous season with the main issue being whether or not Pep Guardiola would decide to extend his contract as manager beyond the end of the 2024–25 season after nine years with the club. Kevin De Bruyne was the only key player who would start the season in the final year of his existing contract, but there was also further speculation on the futures of Kyle Walker and Bernardo Silva, as there had been in previous recent summers. Rumours also emerged that Ederson could be a target for Saudi Pro League club Al Nassr.

A total of 13 current City players were selected for squads for Euro 2024, the joint most alongside Inter Milan, and one player was selected for the 2024 Copa América. Six of those players reached the semi-finals of these competitions played in the week commencing 8 July; five of those would go on to reach the respective finals played on 14 July; and two: Rodri for Spain and Julián Alvarez for Argentina, would celebrate as champions. Rodri was also recognised as the Player of the Tournament for Euro 2024.

Players who had not participated in either competition returned to the club for pre-season training on 15 July to prepare for their forthcoming pre-season tour in the United States. Spanish defender Sergio Gómez had been the first senior player to be transferred, leaving the club after two seasons to join Real Sociedad on 12 July. The first transfer in was announced on 18 July when Brazilian winger Savinho joined from fellow CFG club Troyes, after a successful loan season at Girona, for a reported fee of £21 million.

City took a largely inexperienced squad on their pre-season tour to the US, selecting only 11 previous first team players who had not played at the Euros or Copa America. Their two Croatian Internationals, Joško Gvardiol and Mateo Kovačić, who had returned from Germany after the group stages, joined the tour at its mid-point. The remaining 14 players were allowed extended breaks and would join the squad after its return to the UK. However, this tour squad was able to perform well and only suffered narrow losses to Celtic and Milan, drew with Barcelona and beat Chelsea convincingly with a Haaland hat-trick. The performances of Haaland, Grealish and Oscar Bobb in particular stood out in these games with the latter demonstrating he was ready for more first-team appearances in the coming season.

=== Start of the season ===
In their first competitive game of the season, City won the FA Community Shield by beating fierce rivals Manchester United 7–6 on penalties after a 1–1 draw in regular time, thus avenging the defeat to the same side in the 2024 FA Cup final. United opened the scoring in the 82nd minute with a strike from Alejandro Garnacho, and City equalised in the penultimate minute of normal time with a Bernardo Silva header from an excellent Oscar Bobb run and cross. Although Silva went on to see his first penalty saved, an Ederson save against Jadon Sancho and a miss from Jonny Evans saw City victorious in the penalty shoot-out. It was the first time since 2019 that City had won the competition after consecutive defeats in their previous three appearances.

On 12 August, it was announced that Julián Alvarez would be joining Atlético Madrid for a reported initial fee of £64.4 million with up to £17.1 million in add-ons after two highly successful seasons with City. At the time, this was the highest transfer fee the club had ever received for a player and represented a significant profit for a player acquired for £14 million only two years previously. Alvarez had won the continental treble in 2023, as well as a World Cup and a Copa America title while a City player.

On 23 August, former captain İlkay Gündoğan returned to the club on a free transfer, signing a one-year deal after having spent the previous season at Barcelona.

City began their league campaign with three strong performances and victories away to Chelsea and West Ham United, and at home to newly promoted Ipswich Town. The games against Ipswich and West Ham United included Haaland's 10th and 11th hat-tricks since he joined the club, as he became the Premier League player to score the most goals (7) in the first three games of the season. The Blues led the league over Liverpool on goals scored at the first international break, with both clubs maintaining a 100% record and a goal difference of +7.

On 22 September, City played their first league game of the season against their closest title challengers from the previous two seasons and drew 2–2 at home against Arsenal. The first goal was Haaland's 100th for the club in all competitions, achieved in just 105 appearances. This equalled a record set by Cristiano Ronaldo at Real Madrid for the fastest to reach this milestone at a single club. Arsenal were able to come back to take a 2–1 lead by half time, but saw Leandro Trossard sent off for a second bookable offence shortly before the break. A resolute defensive effort with 10 men and excellent goalkeeping from David Raya was almost enough to secure the victory and three points for the Gunners, but a scrambled goal from John Stones in the eighth minute of injury time saved the point for City and ensured they remained unbeaten and at top of the league by a point from Liverpool and Aston Villa.

Rodri had limped out of the Arsenal match following a collision with Thomas Partey. On 27 September, it was confirmed that the player had ruptured his anterior cruciate ligament and would miss the rest of the season in recovery. Guardiola said Rodri was "irreplaceable" during the previous season's title run-in. Rodri missed five games the previous season and City had lost four of them.

=== Autumn period ===
Manchester City remained unbeaten in all competitions up to the October international break. In the Premier League, they were positioned just a point behind Liverpool, securing second place and edging out Arsenal on goal difference. Their form extended to the Champions League, where they held the eighth spot in the new Swiss-style league phase.

On 7 October, City's legal case against the Premier League over rules on commercial deals involving club owners concluded with a tribunal ruling. The tribunal upheld two aspects of the club's complaints but rejected others. The case, separate from the ongoing investigation into City's alleged financial breaches, found that shareholder loans should not be excluded from associated party transaction (APT) rules and that some recent rule amendments should not be retained. Both sides claimed partial victory, with City pleased about some rulings and the Premier League relieved that most rules were upheld. The ruling could impact other clubs' compliance with financial regulations.

On 14 October, Manchester City's director of football, Txiki Begiristain, announced he would be leaving the club the following June after 12 years, being replaced by Sporting Lisbon's Hugo Viana.

On 28 October, Rodri became the first current City player to win the prestigious Ballon d'Or award.

City faced an injury crisis and a series of four consecutive losses before the final international break of the year, marking their worst losing streak since 2006 under Stuart Pearce. It was also the first time Guardiola had suffered four consecutive defeats in his managerial career. During this period, they were eliminated from the EFL Cup by Tottenham and experienced their first outright Champions League loss in over two years, falling 1–4 to Sporting Lisbon in Portugal. Additionally, this streak ended their 10-month and 32-game unbeaten run in the league with away losses to Bournemouth and Brighton, leaving City in second place, trailing Liverpool by five points.

On 19 November, it was widely reported that Guardiola had extended his contract with the club for a further year to 2026, when he would be able to celebrate the completion of his tenth season at City. Later that week, the club confirmed the extension was for 2 years, until the end of the 2026–27 season.

On 23 November 2024, City lost 0–4 to Tottenham Hotspur that marked the end of their 52-game unbeaten streak at home. It was the Citizen's first home defeat since November 2022 when Brentford claimed a surprise victory at the same venue. Despite having most of the ball possession and creating 23 attempts at goal, City were made to rue wasteful chances while their opponent on the day converted their chances clinically.

=== Christmas and New Year ===
The club's poor run of form continued into December and included further league defeats to Liverpool, Manchester United and Aston Villa; and a comprehensive Champions League defeat away at Juventus. At the nadir, City had just one win in thirteen games with nine defeats.

However, their form improved somewhat in the New Year with consecutive victories against West Ham and Leicester in the league and a comprehensive 8–0 victory against League Two club Salford City in the third round of the FA Cup.

As the January transfer window opened, it was rumoured that City would be in the market for an additional central defender to cover for the reoccurring injuries to John Stones, Rúben Dias and Nathan Aké; an additional defensive midfielder to cover for the long-term injury to Rodri and an additional forward to support Erling Haaland as replacement for Julián Alvarez. On 11 January, Guardiola revealed that club captain Kyle Walker had requested an immediate transfer away from the club. He subsequently joined Milan on loan for the remainder of the season, with an option to buy at the end of the season. Kevin De Bruyne replaced Walker as club captain.

In January 2025, it was reported that Manchester City had reached an agreement with RC Lens and Palmeiras to bring Abdukodir Khusanov and Vitor Reis respectively to the City of Manchester Stadium. The deal for the former was believed to be £33.5 million while the latter £29.6 million. Both deals were confirmed on 20 and 21 January. It was also rumoured that City had agreed with Eintracht Frankfurt for the signing of forward Omar Marmoush on a five-year deal. That transfer was confirmed on 23 January.

Consecutive defeats in the Champions League league stage at Juventus and Paris Saint Germain had left City unexpectedly on the verge of elimination from the competition. They required a victory in their final league stage game home to Club Brugge to avoid this. On 29 January, City came back from a goal down to win 3–1. However, their final position in the league table at 22nd meant they would have to compete for a place in the last 16 round in a two-legged playoff game against either Bayern Munich or defending champions Real Madrid. The resulting ties against Madrid meant the two clubs were meeting for the fourth consecutive season in the competition at the knockout stages.

On 2 February, City suffered a comprehensive 1–5 defeat at the Emirates Stadium to their closest rivals of recent seasons, Arsenal. City had conceded an early goal from a defensive error, but equalised in the 55th minute thanks to Haaland. However, the Gunners went on to quickly score four unanswered goals to delight their fans and close the gap to league leaders Liverpool. The defeat left City in fifth place, two points behind Chelsea.

Before the winter transfer window closed the following day, City completed their fourth significant signing of the window, welcoming defensive midfielder Nico González from Porto for £50 million.

On 11 February, City were defeated 2–3 In the first leg of their play-off tie at home to Real Madrid. Despite having led twice with goals from Haaland, Madrid were able to equalise with strikes from Kylian Mbappé and ex-City youth player Brahim Díaz, before Jude Bellingham scored with virtually the last kick of the match to take a one-goal advantage back home for the second leg the following week; and end City's undefeated home streak in the competition which had stretched to 34 games over more than six seasons.

A 4–0 home victory over Newcastle United the following weekend provided some hope that team's performances were improving, and that the new players recruited in January were already impressing. The game was notable for a debut hat-trick from Marmoush and an impressive performance from Nico, whom Guardiola later described as a "mini-Rodri".

However, on 19 February, City suffered a further defeat in Madrid, losing 1–3 on the night through a Mbappé hat-trick, and 3–6 on aggregate. This ended City's participation in European competition for the season and was the first time the Blues had failed to reach the last 16 of the Champions League since 2012–13, when they had been knocked out at the group stages.

Defeat at home to runaway league leaders Liverpool followed by victory away to Tottenham Hotspur at the end of February put City back into fourth place and the qualification places for next season's Champions League just a point behind surprise third-placed team Nottingham Forest, and a point ahead of Chelsea in fifth.

=== Season run-in ===
The FA Cup was now City's only realistic chance of domestic silverware for the season. They faced lower-league opposition in the third, fourth and fifth rounds and duly qualified for the quarter-finals where they were drawn away to Premier League opposition for the first time that season against Bournemouth.

Otherwise, their objective was to secure Champions League qualification in the remaining league fixtures and prepare for the FIFA Club World Cup being held in June.

On 30 March, Manchester City won their FA Cup quarter-final tie against Bournemouth 2–1, coming from behind with both goals assisted by academy graduate Nico O'Reilly who came on at half-time and played at left-back rather than his usual midfield role. However, the result was marred by an ankle injury picked up by top scorer Erling Haaland, which the club later announced would rule him out for five to seven weeks and possibly the remainder of the regular season. Nevertheless, City comfortably beat Leicester City 2–0 in their next league fixture with Omar Marmoush playing as the centre forward.

On 4 April, Kevin De Bruyne announced on his social media that he would be leaving the club at the end of the season after 10 years. With a record 18 trophies and four Player of the Season awards at that time, he would be considered one of the greatest footballers to have ever played for the club.

On 6 April, the 196th Manchester derby ended in a 0–0 draw at Old Trafford to leave City in fifth place, one point behind Chelsea and a point ahead of Aston Villa, with Newcastle in seventh, two points behind but with two games in hand.

Three consecutive league victories (against Crystal Palace, Everton and Aston Villa) for the first time since October 2024 in April kept City in the race for Champions League qualification.

On 27 April, the Blues beat Nottingham Forest 2–0 at Wembley Stadium with goals from Rico Lewis and Joško Gvardiol to qualify for their third consecutive FA Cup final where they would meet Crystal Palace.

On 17 May, Palace secured their first-ever major trophy with a 1–0 victory over City in the 2025 FA Cup final at Wembley. Eberechi Eze scored the decisive goal in the 16th minute, finishing a well-crafted counterattack set up by Daniel Muñoz. Despite City's dominance in possession, Palace goalkeeper Dean Henderson, who had avoided an early red card when he handled the ball outside his area to thwart a Haaland one-on-one chance, emerged as a hero, saving a penalty from Omar Marmoush and making key stops throughout the match. City's frustration grew as they failed to claim major domestic silverware for the first time since the 2016–17 season.

The final home game against Bournemouth on 20 May was notable for a stunning goal of the season from Marmoush, the long-awaited return of Rodri from his injury and the final home appearance of Kevin De Bruyne who was honoured in a presentation after the game.

A run of 10 unbeaten league games ensured City concluded the 2024–25 Premier League season in third place, securing UEFA Champions League qualification with a 2–0 victory at Fulham on the final day. However, their 71 points collected over the season was their worst points haul since 2015–16, and the worst for Pep Guardiola as a manager over a 38-match league season.

=== End of season and FIFA Club World Cup ===
The revamped 2025 FIFA Club World Cup spanned both the official 2024–25 and 2025–26 seasons. The Premier League announced on 27 March that an additional transfer window would open from 1 to 10 June to align with the window announced by FIFA in October 2024 that would permit participants in that competition to make transfers before the competition began.

It had been anticipated that City's squad would need a major overhaul in the summer to remain competitive at the highest level after a trophyless season. While this transition began in the previous January transfer window, further changes were expected, particularly in midfield, at full-back and potentially at centre-half if the club chose to offload some of their aging and injury-prone players. Specifically, City were rumoured to be progressing their interests in left back Rayan Aït-Nouri from Wolverhampton Wanderers, and midfielders Tijjani Reijnders from Milan and Rayan Cherki from Lyon in order to complete these in time for the Club World Cup. City had also previously been linked with an interest in Bayer Leverkusen star Florian Wirtz, but had pulled out of negotiations.

These three transfers, and that of back-up goalkeeper Marcus Bettinelli from Chelsea, were duly completed between 9 and 11 June at a total estimated cost of £112 million.

On 19 June, Guardiola announced he would be breaking from the tradition of recent seasons and appointing his own club captain and leadership team instead of leaving it to a team vote. He subsequently confirmed that Bernardo Silva would take over the captaincy from De Bruyne, supported by Rodri, Dias, Haaland and Gündogan.

Manchester City comfortably won their three group games at the Club World Cup, including an impressive 5–2 victory against Juventus which ensured they would avoid some of the other major European clubs in the knock-out rounds. However, City went on to exit the competition at the round of 16 stage with a 3–4 a.e.t. defeat to Al-Hilal.

== First-team squad ==
As of 1 June 2025

| No. | Player | Position | Nationality | Date of birth (age) | Signed from | Date signed | Fee | Contract end |
Goalkeepers
| 18 | Stefan Ortega | GK | (Germany) | 6 November 1992 (aged 32) | (Germany) Arminia Bielefeld | 1 July 2022 | Free transfer | 2026 |
| 31 | Ederson | GK | (Brazil) | 17 August 1993 (aged 31) | (Portugal) Benfica | 1 July 2017 | £34.9m | 2026 |
| 33 | Scott Carson | GK | (England) | 2 September 1985 (aged 39) | Derby County | 20 July 2021 | Free transfer | 2025 |
Defenders
| 3 | Rúben Dias (VC) | CB | (Portugal) | 14 May 1997 (aged 28) | (Portugal) Benfica | 29 September 2020 | £62.0m (Note: City player Nicolás Otamendi was included in the deal, bringing the transfer fee paid to £50m.) | 2027 |
| 5 | John Stones | CB / RB / DM | (England) | 28 May 1994 (aged 31) | Everton | 9 August 2016 | £47.5m | 2026 |
| 6 | Nathan Aké | CB / LB | (Netherlands) | 18 February 1995 (aged 30) | Bournemouth | 5 August 2020 | £40.0m | 2027 |
| 22 | Vitor Reis | CB / RB | (Brazil) | 12 January 2006 (aged 19) | (Brazil) Palmeiras | 21 January 2025 | £29.6m | 2029 |
| 24 | Joško Gvardiol | CB / LB | (Croatia) | 23 January 2002 (aged 23) | (Germany) RB Leipzig | 5 August 2023 | £77.5m | 2028 |
| 25 | Manuel Akanji | CB / RB / LB / DM | (Switzerland) | 19 July 1995 (aged 29) | (Germany) Borussia Dortmund | 1 September 2022 | £15.0m | 2027 |
| 45 | Abdukodir Khusanov | CB / RB | (Uzbekistan) | 29 February 2004 (aged 21) | (France) Lens | 20 January 2025 | £33.6m | 2029 |
| 82 | Rico Lewis | RB / DM | (England) | 21 November 2004 (aged 20) | Academy | 1 July 2022 | —N/a | 2028 |
Midfielders
| 8 | Mateo Kovačić | DM / CM | (Croatia) | 6 May 1994 (aged 31) | Chelsea | 27 June 2023 | £25.0m | 2027 |
| 10 | Jack Grealish | LW / AM | (England) | 10 September 1995 (aged 29) | Aston Villa | 5 August 2021 | £100.0m | 2027 |
| 11 | Jérémy Doku | RW / LW / AM | (Belgium) | 27 May 2002 (aged 23) | (France) Rennes | 24 August 2023 | £55.5m | 2028 |
| 14 | Nico González | DM / CM | (Spain) | 3 January 2002 (aged 23) | (Portugal) Porto | 3 February 2025 | £50.0m | 2029 |
| 16 | Rodri (VC) | DM / CM | (Spain) | 22 June 1996 (aged 29) | (Spain) Atlético Madrid | 4 July 2019 | £62.8m | 2027 |
| 17 | Kevin De Bruyne (C) | CM / AM | (Belgium) | 28 June 1991 (aged 34) | (Germany) VfL Wolfsburg | 30 August 2015 | £54.5m | 2025 |
| 19 | İlkay Gündoğan (VC) | CM / DM | (Germany) | 24 October 1990 (aged 34) | (Spain) Barcelona | 23 August 2024 | Free transfer | 2026 |
| 20 | Bernardo Silva (VC) | CM / AM / LW / RW | (Portugal) | 10 August 1994 (aged 30) | (France) Monaco | 1 July 2017 | £43.5m | 2026 |
| 26 | Savinho | RW / LW | (Brazil) | 10 April 2004 (aged 21) | (France) Troyes | 18 July 2024 | £21.0m | 2029 |
| 27 | Matheus Nunes | CM / AM / DM / LW / RW / RB | (Portugal) | 27 August 1998 (aged 26) | Wolverhampton Wanderers | 1 September 2023 | £53.0m | 2028 |
| 30 | Claudio Echeverri | AM / LW | (Argentina) | 2 January 2006 (aged 19) | (Argentina) River Plate | 25 January 2024 | £12.5m | 2028 |
| 47 | Phil Foden | AM / LW / RW | (England) | 28 May 2000 (aged 25) | Academy | 1 July 2017 | —N/a | 2027 |
| 52 | Oscar Bobb | RW / ST | (Norway) | 12 July 2003 (aged 21) | (Norway) Vålerenga | 12 July 2019 | —N/a | 2029 |
| 75 | Nico O'Reilly | LB / CM / AM / LW / RW | (England) | 21 March 2005 (aged 20) | Academy | 1 July 2022 | —N/a | 2026 |
| 87 | James McAtee | CM / AM / LW / RW | (England) | 18 October 2002 (aged 22) | Academy | 1 July 2021 | —N/a | 2026 |
Forwards
| 7 | Omar Marmoush | ST / AM / LW / RW / SS | (Egypt) | 7 February 1999 (aged 26) | (Germany) Frankfurt | 23 January 2025 | £59.0m | 2029 |
| 9 | Erling Haaland | ST | (Norway) | 21 July 2000 (aged 24) | (Germany) Borussia Dortmund | 1 July 2022 | £51.2m | 2034 |

Includes first team players and EDS players who train routinely with the first team and have made at least one league appearance. Ages are as of the end of the season (30th June 2025)

Key

# – Current EDS Squad player.
† – Signed in January window.
‡ – Initially signed to Academy team.

== Transfers ==
=== Transfers in ===
| Date | Pos. | No. | Player | From | Fee | Team | Ref. |
|---|---|---|---|---|---|---|---|
| 18 July 2024 | RW | 26 | (Brazil) Savinho | (France) Troyes | £21,000,000 | First team | |
| 23 August 2024 | MF | 19 | (Germany) İlkay Gündoğan | (Spain) Barcelona | Free transfer | First team | |
| 30 August 2024 | FW | 67 | (England) Divin Mubama | West Ham United | £2,000,000 | Academy | |
| 20 January 2025 | CB | 45 | (Uzbekistan) Abdukodir Khusanov | (France) Lens | £33,600,000 | First team | |
| 21 January 2025 | CB | 22 | (Brazil) Vitor Reis | (Brazil) Palmeiras | £29,600,000 | First team | |
| 23 January 2025 | FW | 7 | (Egypt) Omar Marmoush | (Germany) Eintracht Frankfurt | £59,000,000 | First team | |
| 27 January 2025 | DF | 46 | (England) Christian McFarlane | (United States) New York City | Undisclosed | Academy | |
| 27 January 2025 | DF | – | (Sierra Leone) Juma Bah | (Spain) Valladolid | £5,100,000 | First team | |
| 3 February 2025 | MF | 14 | (Spain) Nico González | (Portugal) Porto | £50,000,000 | First team | |
| 9 June 2025 | LB | 21 | (Algeria) Rayan Aït-Nouri (Note: Transfer for the 2025–26 season, but eligible to start in 2024–25 for the 2025 FIFA Club World Cup.) | (England) Wolverhampton Wanderers | £31,800,000 | First team | |
| 10 June 2025 | GK | 13 | (England) Marcus Bettinelli (Note: Transfer for the 2025–26 season, but eligible to start in 2024–25 for the 2025 FIFA Club World Cup.) | (England) Chelsea | Undisclosed | First team | |
| 10 June 2025 | RW | 29 | (France) Rayan Cherki (Note: Transfer for the 2025–26 season, but eligible to start in 2024–25 for the 2025 FIFA Club World Cup.) | (France) Lyon | £34,000,000 | First team | |
| 11 June 2025 | CM | 4 | (Netherlands) Tijjani Reijnders (Note: Transfer for the 2025–26 season, but eligible to start in 2024–25 for the 2025 FIFA Club World Cup.) | (Italy) Milan | £46,300,000 | First team | |
| Total | | | | | £312,400,000 | | |

=== Transfers out ===
| Date | Pos. | No. | Player | To | Fee | Team | Ref. |
|---|---|---|---|---|---|---|---|
| 1 July 2024 | MF | 69 | (England) Tommy Doyle | Wolverhampton Wanderers | £4,300,000 | Academy | |
| 1 July 2024 | DF | 12 | (England) Taylor Harwood-Bellis | Southampton | £20,000,000 | Academy | |
| 1 July 2024 | MF | — | (Argentina) Darío Sarmiento | (Argentina) Tigre | £1,300,000 | City Football Group | |
| 2 July 2024 | MF | 71 | (Scotland) Lewis Fiorini | Stockport County | £1,000,000 | Academy | |
| 12 July 2024 | DF | 21 | (Spain) Sergio Gómez | (Spain) Real Sociedad | £8,400,000 | First team | |
| 13 July 2024 | FW | 48 | (England) Liam Delap | Ipswich Town | £15,000,000 | Academy | |
| 7 August 2024 | MF | 93 | (Australia) Alex Robertson | (Wales) Cardiff City | £1,000,000 | Academy | |
| 9 August 2024 | FW | 92 | (England) Micah Hamilton | Middlesbrough | £3,500,000 | Academy | |
| 12 August 2024 | FW | 96 | (England) Ben Knight | (Spain) Murcia | Free transfer | Academy | |
| 12 August 2024 | FW | 19 | (Argentina) Julián Alvarez | (Spain) Atlético Madrid | £81,500,000 (Note: Fee widely reported as £64,400,000 initially, with up to £17,100,000 in add-ons.) | First team | |
| 20 August 2024 | MF | 67 | (England) Kane Taylor | Aston Villa | £750,000 | Academy | |
| 27 August 2024 | DF | 7 | (Portugal) João Cancelo | (Saudi Arabia) Al-Hilal | £21,000,000 | First team | |
| 30 August 2024 | GK | 83 | (England) George Murray-Jones | Nottingham Forest | £1,100,000 | Academy | |
| 4 September 2024 | FW | — | (Serbia) Filip Stevanović | (Belgium) Lommel | Undisclosed | Academy | |
| 4 February 2025 | MF | 96 | (England) Dan Batty | Tottenham Hotspur | Free | Academy | |
| 4 February 2025 | MF | — | (England) Seth Chingwaro | Fulham | Free | Academy | |
| Total | | | | | £158,850,000 | | |

=== Loaned out ===
| Date | Pos. | No. | Player | Loaned to | On loan until | Team | Ref. |
|---|---|---|---|---|---|---|---|
| 10 July 2024 | GK | 88 | (England) True Grant | Buxton | End of season | Academy | |
| 3 August 2024 | DF | 39 | (Brazil) Yan Couto | (Germany) Borussia Dortmund | End of season | City Football Group | |
| 6 August 2024 | MF | 76 | (Spain) Mahamadou Susoho | Peterborough United | 17 August 2024 | Academy | |
| 6 August 2024 | DF | 86 | (England) Callum Doyle | Norwich City | End of season | Academy | |
| 7 August 2024 | DF | 74 | (Finland) Tomas Galvez | (Austria) LASK | 10 January 2025 (Note: On 10 January 2025, Galvez was recalled from his loan at LASK.) | Academy | |
| 9 August 2024 | DF | 94 | (England) Finley Burns | Hull City | End of season | Academy | |
| 12 August 2024 | DF | 79 | (England) Luke Mbete | Northampton Town | End of season | Academy | |
| 12 August 2024 | MF | 50 | (England) Kian Breckin | Crewe Alexandra | 21 January 2025 (Note: On 21 January 2025, Breckin was recalled back from his loan at Crewe.) | Academy | |
| 16 August 2024 | MF | 4 | (England) Kalvin Phillips | Ipswich Town | End of season | First team | |
| 25 August 2024 | MF | 32 | (Argentina) Máximo Perrone | (Italy) Como | End of season | First team | |
| 26 August 2024 | FW | 37 | (Brazil) Kayky | (Netherlands) Sparta Rotterdam | 6 February 2025 (Note: Kayky was recalled from his season-long loan at Sparta Rotterdam in February 2025 after making 7 appearances.) | Academy | |
| 30 August 2024 | DF | 70 | (England) Jadel Katongo | Peterborough United | End of season | Academy | |
| 1 September 2024 | DF | 78 | (Burkina Faso) Issa Kaboré | (Portugal) Benfica | 6 January 2025 (Note: Kabore was recalled from his season-long loan at Benfica in January 2025 after making 7 appearances.) | City Football Group | |
| 3 September 2024 | FW | 73 | (England) Joel Ndala | (Netherlands) PSV Eindhoven | 4 February 2025 (Note: Ndala was recalled from his season-long loan at PSV in February 2025.) | Academy | |
| 7 January 2025 | DF | 78 | (Burkina Faso) Issa Kaboré | (Germany) Werder Bremen | End of season | City Football Group | |
| 12 January 2025 | DF | 74 | (Finland) Tomas Galvez | (Netherlands) SC Cambuur | End of season | Academy | |
| 22 January 2025 | DF | 97 | (England) Josh Wilson-Esbrand | Stoke City | End of season | First team | |
| 24 January 2025 | DF | 2 | (England) Kyle Walker | (Italy) Milan | End of season | First team | |
| 27 January 2025 | DF | – | (Sierra Leone) Juma Bah | (France) Lens | End of season | First team | |
| 4 February 2025 | MF | 56 | (England) Jacob Wright | Norwich City | End of season | Academy | |
| 4 February 2025 | FW | 73 | (England) Joel Ndala | Nottingham Forest | End of season | Academy | |
| 7 February 2025 | FW | 37 | (Brazil) Kayky | (Brazil) Bahia | End of season | Academy | |
| 7 February 2025 | FW | 48 | (England) Brooklyn Nfonkeu | Leeds United | End of season | Academy | |

=== Released ===
| Date | Pos. | No. | Player | Subsequent club | Join date | Team | Ref. |
|---|---|---|---|---|---|---|---|
| 1 July 2024 | MF | 61 | (Scotland) Josh Adam | (Wales) Wrexham | 9 September 2024 | Academy | |
| 1 July 2024 | DF | — | (England) Jamal Baptiste | (England) Sheffield United | 5 November 2024 | Academy | |

=== New contracts ===
| Date | Pos. | No. | Player | Contract until | Team | Ref. |
|---|---|---|---|---|---|---|
| 8 June 2024 | GK | 18 | (Germany) Stefan Ortega | 2026 | First team | |
| 17 January 2025 | FW | 9 | (Norway) Erling Haaland | 2034 | First team | |
| 14 April 2025 | MF | 19 | (Germany) İlkay Gündoğan | 2026 | First team | |

== Pre-season and friendlies ==
On 19 March 2024, Manchester City announced they would return to the United States during pre-season, with matches against Celtic, Milan, Barcelona and Chelsea as part of the 2024 Florida Cup.

| 23 July 2024 FC Series | Manchester City | 3–4 | Celtic | Chapel Hill, United States |
| 19:30 EDT | Bobb 33'; Perrone 46'; Haaland 57' | Report | Kühn 13', 36'; Furuhashi 44'; Palma 68'; Kwon (yellow card) 76'; Lagerbielke (yellow card) 84' | Stadium: Kenan Memorial Stadium; Referee: Ted Unkel (United States) |

| 27 July 2024 FC Series; Soccer Champions Tour | Manchester City | 2–3 | Milan | New York City, United States |
| 18:00 EDT | Haaland 19'; McAtee 55' | Report | Colombo 30', 34'; Saelemaekers (yellow card) 73'; Nasti 78' | Stadium: Yankee Stadium; Attendance: 46,122; Referee: Serhiy Boyko (Ukraine) |

| 30 July 2024 FC Series; Soccer Champions Tour | Barcelona | 2–2 (4–1 p) | Manchester City | Orlando, United States |
| 20:20 EDT | Víctor 24'; Torre 45+2'; Casadó (yellow card) 55' | Report | O'Reilly 39', (yellow card) 56'; Grealish 60'; Susoho (yellow card) 70' | Stadium: Camping World Stadium; Attendance: 63,237; Referee: Tim Ford (United States) |
| | Penalties |
| | Lewandowski (penalty scored); Darvich (penalty scored); Balde (penalty scored); T. Fernández (penalty scored) | | (penalty missed) Phillips; (penalty missed) Wright; (penalty scored) Fatah |

| 3 August 2024 FC Series | Manchester City | 4–2 | Chelsea | Columbus, United States |
| 17:30 EDT | Haaland 4' (pen.), 5', 56'; McAtee (yellow card) 41'; Bobb 55' | Report | Caicedo (yellow card) 14'; Gusto (yellow card) 42'; Fernández (yellow card) 45'; Sterling 59'; Madueke 89' | Stadium: Ohio Stadium; Attendance: 71,280; Referee: Ted Unkel (United States) |

== Competitions ==
=== Overall record ===
| Competition | First match | Last match | Starting round | Final position | Record | | | | | | | |
| Competition | First match | Last match | Starting round | Final position | Pld | W | D | L | GF | GA | GD | Win % |
|---|---|---|---|---|---|---|---|---|---|---|---|---|
| Premier League | 18 August 2024 | 25 May 2025 | Matchday 1 | Third place | 38 | 21 | 8 | 9 | 72 | 44 | +28 | 55.26 |
| FA Cup | 11 January 2025 | 17 May 2025 | Third round | Runners-up | 6 | 5 | 0 | 1 | 17 | 4 | +13 | 83.33 |
| EFL Cup | 24 September 2024 | 30 October 2024 | Third round | Fourth round | 2 | 1 | 0 | 1 | 3 | 3 | +0 | 50.00 |
| FA Community Shield | 10 August 2024 | | Final | Winners | 1 | 0 | 1 | 0 | 1 | 1 | +0 | 0.00 |
| UEFA Champions League | 18 September 2024 | 19 February 2025 | League phase | Knockout phase play-offs | 10 | 3 | 2 | 5 | 21 | 20 | +1 | 30.00 |
| FIFA Club World Cup | 18 June 2025 | 30 June 2025 | Group stage | Round of 16 | 4 | 3 | 0 | 1 | 16 | 6 | +10 | 75.00 |
| Total | | | | | 61 | 33 | 11 | 17 | 130 | 78 | +52 | 54.10 |

Source: Soccerway

=== Premier League ===
==== League table ====
| Pos | Team | Pld | W | D | L | GF | GA | GD | Pts | Qualification or relegation |
|---|---|---|---|---|---|---|---|---|---|---|
| 1 | Liverpool (C) | 38 | 25 | 9 | 4 | 86 | 41 | +45 | 84 | Qualification for the Champions League league phase (Note: The Premier League gained an additional Champions League place as a result of England gaining one of the two European Performance Spots (EPS) awarded to the two associations with the highest UEFA coefficient points in 2024–25.) |
| 2 | Arsenal | 38 | 20 | 14 | 4 | 69 | 34 | +35 | 74 | Qualification for the Champions League league phase |
| 3 | Manchester City | 38 | 21 | 8 | 9 | 72 | 44 | +28 | 71 | Qualification for the Champions League league phase |
| 4 | Chelsea | 38 | 20 | 9 | 9 | 64 | 43 | +21 | 69 | Qualification for the Champions League league phase |
| 5 | Newcastle United | 38 | 20 | 6 | 12 | 68 | 47 | +21 | 66 | Qualification for the Champions League league phase |

Source: Premier League
Rules for classification: 1) Points; 2) Goal difference; 3) Goals scored; 4) If the champions, relegated teams or qualified teams for UEFA competitions cannot be determined by rules 1 to 3, rules 4.1 to 4.3 are applied – 4.1) Points gained in head-to-head record between such teams; 4.2) Away goals scored in head-to-head record between such teams; 4.3) Play-offs
(C) Champions

==== Results summary ====
| Overall | | | | | | | | Home | | | | | | Away | | | | | |
| Pld | W | D | L | GF | GA | GD | Pts | W | D | L | GF | GA | GD | W | D | L | GF | GA | GD |
|---|---|---|---|---|---|---|---|---|---|---|---|---|---|---|---|---|---|---|---|
| 38 | 21 | 8 | 9 | 72 | 44 | +28 | 71 | 13 | 3 | 3 | 43 | 23 | +20 | 8 | 5 | 6 | 29 | 21 | +8 |

Source: Soccerway

==== Results by round ====
| Round | 1 | 2 | 3 | 4 | 5 | 6 | 7 | 8 | 9 | 10 | 11 | 12 | 13 | 14 | 15 | 16 | 17 | 18 | 19 | 20 | 21 | 22 | 23 | 24 | 25 | 26 | 27 | 28 | 29 | 30 | 31 | 32 | 33 | 34 | 35 | 36 | 37 | 38 |
|---|---|---|---|---|---|---|---|---|---|---|---|---|---|---|---|---|---|---|---|---|---|---|---|---|---|---|---|---|---|---|---|---|---|---|---|---|---|---|
| Ground | A | H | A | H | H | A | H | A | H | A | A | H | A | H | A | H | A | H | A | H | A | A | H | A | H | H | A | A | H | H | A | H | A | H | H | A | H | A |
| Result | W | W | W | W | D | D | W | W | W | L | L | L | L | W | D | L | L | D | W | W | D | W | W | L | W | L | W | L | D | W | D | W | W | W | W | D | W | W |
| Position | 4 | 1 | 1 | 1 | 1 | 2 | 2 | 2 | 1 | 2 | 2 | 2 | 5 | 4 | 4 | 5 | 7 | 7 | 6 | 6 | 6 | 5 | 4 | 5 | 4 | 4 | 4 | 5 | 5 | 5 | 6 | 5 | 5 | 4 | 3 | 4 | 3 | 3 |
| Points | 3 | 6 | 9 | 12 | 13 | 14 | 17 | 20 | 23 | 23 | 23 | 23 | 23 | 26 | 27 | 27 | 27 | 28 | 31 | 34 | 35 | 38 | 41 | 41 | 44 | 44 | 47 | 47 | 48 | 51 | 52 | 55 | 58 | 61 | 64 | 65 | 68 | 71 |

Source: Premier League
W = Win; D = Draw; L = Loss; P = Postponed

==== Matches ====
The league fixtures were released on 18 June 2024.

Note: Home attendance figures have been sourced from Manchester City F.C. programmes and have been validated by the MCFC Communications Department. Erroneous figures of '55,017' as released by the Premier League are estimated crowds based upon an outdated capacity.

Win Draw Loss

| 18 August 2024 1 | Chelsea | 0–2 | Manchester City | Fulham |
| 16:30 BST | Caicedo (yellow card) 89' | Report | Haaland 18', (yellow card) 66'; Kovačić 84' | Stadium: Stamford Bridge; Attendance: 39,818; Referee: Anthony Taylor |

| 24 August 2024 2 | Manchester City | 4–1 | Ipswich Town | Manchester |
| 15:00 BST | Haaland 12' (pen.), 16', 88'; De Bruyne 14'; Dias (yellow card) 59'; Grealish (yellow card) 90+5' | Report | Szmodics 7', (yellow card) 55'; Morsy (yellow card) 36'; Al-Hamadi (yellow card) 90+4' | Stadium: City of Manchester Stadium; Attendance: 52,811; Referee: Michael Salisbury |

| 31 August 2024 3 | West Ham United | 1–3 | Manchester City | Stratford |
| 17:30 BST | Dias 19' (o.g.); Emerson (yellow card) 61'; Kilman (yellow card) 63'; Rodríguez (yellow card) 75' | Report | Haaland 10', 30', 83'; De Bruyne (yellow card) 44'; Akanji (yellow card) 90+1' | Stadium: London Stadium; Attendance: 62,469; Referee: Michael Oliver |
Note: Fixture was initially scheduled for a 15:00 kick-off, but was moved for live Sky Sports broadcast.

| 14 September 2024 4 | Manchester City | 2–1 | Brentford | Manchester |
| 15:00 BST | Haaland 19', 32'; Kovačić (yellow card) 42'; Savinho (yellow card) 47'; Stones (yellow card) 79' | Report | Wissa 1'; Collins (yellow card) 82' | Stadium: City of Manchester Stadium; Attendance: 52,142; Referee: Darren Bond |

| 22 September 2024 5 | Manchester City | 2–2 | Arsenal | Manchester |
| 16:30 BST | Haaland 9'; Ederson (yellow card) 23'; Dias (yellow card) 45+1'; Silva (yellow card) 90+1'; Stones 90+8' | Report | Calafiori 22'; Trossard (yellow card) 34' (yellow-red card) 45+8'; Gabriel 45+1'; Partey (yellow card) 45+7'; Lewis-Skelly (yellow card) 65'; Rice (yellow card) 83'; Gabriel Jesus (yellow card) 90+6' | Stadium: City of Manchester Stadium; Attendance: 52,846; Referee: Michael Oliver |
Note: Fixture was initially scheduled for a 15:00 kick-off, but was moved for live Sky Sports broadcast.

| 28 September 2024 6 | Newcastle United | 1–1 | Manchester City | Newcastle upon Tyne |
| 12:30 BST | Schär (yellow card) 26'; Bruno Guimarães (yellow card) 32'; Gordon 58' (pen.); Tonali (yellow card) 62'; Joelinton (yellow card) 63' | Report | Gvardiol 35'; Ederson (yellow card) 56'; Kovačić (yellow card) 60'; Grealish (yellow card) 62'; Dias (yellow card) 90' | Stadium: St James' Park; Attendance: 52,248; Referee: Jarred Gillett |
Note: Fixture was initially scheduled for a 15:00 kick-off, but was moved for live TNT Sports broadcast.

| 5 October 2024 7 | Manchester City | 3–2 | Fulham | Manchester |
| 15:00 BST | Kovačić 32', 47'; Doku 82'; Ederson (yellow card) 90+3'; Silva (yellow card) 90+5' | Report | Pereira 26'; Bassey (yellow card) 64'; Muniz 88' | Stadium: City of Manchester Stadium; Attendance: 52,719; Referee: Peter Bankes |

| 20 October 2024 8 | Wolverhampton Wanderers | 1–2 | Manchester City | Wolverhampton |
| 14:00 BST | Larsen 7'; Toti (yellow card) 14'; Semedo (yellow card) 20'; João Gomes (yellow card) 63'; Sarabia (yellow card) 90+8' | Report | Gvardiol 33'; Savinho (yellow card) 39'; Stones 90+5' | Stadium: Molineux Stadium; Attendance: 31,319; Referee: Chris Kavanagh |
Note: Fixture was initially scheduled for 19 October, but was moved for live Sky Sports broadcast.

| 26 October 2024 9 | Manchester City | 1–0 | Southampton | Manchester |
| 15:00 BST | Haaland 5'; Kovačić (yellow card) 88' | Report | Downes (yellow card) 42'; Armstrong (yellow card) 48'; Lallana (yellow card) 56' | Stadium: City of Manchester Stadium; Attendance: 52,844; Referee: Tony Harrington |

| 2 November 2024 10 | Bournemouth | 2–1 | Manchester City | Bournemouth |
| 15:00 GMT | Christie (yellow card) 6'; Semenyo 9'; Evanilson 64'; Adams (yellow card) 90+1' | Report | Walker (yellow card) 71'; Gvardiol 82' | Stadium: Dean Court; Attendance: 11,231; Referee: Michael Oliver |

| 9 November 2024 11 | Brighton & Hove Albion | 2–1 | Manchester City | Brighton and Hove |
| 17:30 GMT | Ayari (yellow card) 19'; Igor (yellow card) 44'; João Pedro 78'; O'Riley 83'; Van Hecke (yellow card) 90+10' | Report | Haaland 23', (yellow card) 90+10'; Lewis (yellow card) 37'; Simpson-Pusey (yellow card) 77' | Stadium: Falmer Stadium; Attendance: 31,715; Referee: Sam Barrott |
Note: Fixture was initially scheduled for a 15:00 kick-off, but was moved for live Sky Sports broadcast.

| 23 November 2024 12 | Manchester City | 0–4 | Tottenham Hotspur | Manchester |
| 17:30 GMT | Lewis (yellow card) 55'; Silva (yellow card) 78'; De Bruyne (yellow card) 80'; Akanji (yellow card) 90+2' | Report | Bissouma (yellow card) 1'; Maddison 13', 20'; Porro 52'; Sarr (yellow card) 80'; Johnson 90+3' | Stadium: City of Manchester Stadium; Attendance: 52,478; Referee: John Brooks |
Note: Fixture was initially scheduled for a 15:00 kick-off, but was moved for live Sky Sports broadcast.

| 1 December 2024 13 | Liverpool | 2–0 | Manchester City | Liverpool |
| 16:00 GMT | Gakpo 12'; Gravenberch (yellow card) 36'; Salah 78' (pen.) | Report | Nunes (yellow card) 24'; Foden (yellow card) 32'; Akanji (yellow card) 45+1' | Stadium: Anfield; Attendance: 60,248; Referee: Chris Kavanagh |
Note: Fixture was initially scheduled for 30 November, but was moved for live Sky Sports broadcast.

| 4 December 2024 14 | Manchester City | 3–0 | Nottingham Forest | Manchester |
| 19:30 GMT | Silva 8', (yellow card) 69'; De Bruyne 31'; Gündoğan (yellow card) 52'; Doku 57' | Report | Domínguez (yellow card) 45+1'; Gibbs-White (yellow card) 52'; Murillo (yellow card) 54'; Milenković (yellow card) 76' | Stadium: City of Manchester Stadium; Attendance: 51,764; Referee: Michael Oliver |

| 7 December 2024 15 | Crystal Palace | 2–2 | Manchester City | Selhurst |
| 15:00 GMT | Muñoz 4'; Lacroix 56'; Nketiah (yellow card) 90+3' | Report | Haaland 30'; Lewis 68', (yellow card) 70' (yellow-red card) 84' | Stadium: Selhurst Park; Attendance: 25,142; Referee: Robert Jones |

| 15 December 2024 16 | Manchester City | 1–2 | Manchester United | Manchester |
| 16:30 GMT | Gvardiol 36'; Walker (yellow card) 40' | Report | Højlund (yellow card) 40'; Fernandes 88' (pen.); Amad 90' | Stadium: City of Manchester Stadium; Attendance: 52,788; Referee: Anthony Taylor |

| 21 December 2024 17 | Aston Villa | 2–1 | Manchester City | Birmingham |
| 12:30 GMT | Durán 16'; Cash (yellow card) 37'; Martínez (yellow card) 45+2'; Rogers 65'; McGinn (yellow card) 90+4' | Report | Lewis (yellow card) 47'; Gvardiol (yellow card) 84'; Grealish (yellow card) 87'; Foden 90+3' | Stadium: Villa Park; Attendance: 42,345; Referee: Peter Bankes |

| 26 December 2024 18 | Manchester City | 1–1 | Everton | Manchester |
| 12:30 GMT | Silva 14'; Haaland (penalty missed) 53'; Foden (yellow card) 90+4' | Report | Ndiaye 36'; Mykolenko (yellow card) 42'; Coleman (yellow card) 52'; Mangala (yellow card) 79'; Branthwaite (yellow card) 87' | Stadium: City of Manchester Stadium; Attendance: 52,527; Referee: Simon Hooper |

| 29 December 2024 19 | Leicester City | 0–2 | Manchester City | Leicester |
| 14:30 GMT | Soumaré (yellow card) 56'; El Khannouss (yellow card) 65' | Report | Savinho 21'; Haaland 74'; Ortega (yellow card) 78' | Stadium: King Power Stadium; Attendance: 32,057; Referee: Michael Oliver |
Note: Fixture was initially scheduled for a 15:00 kick-off, but was moved for live Sky Sports broadcasting.

| 4 January 2025 20 | Manchester City | 4–1 | West Ham United | Manchester |
| 15:00 GMT | Coufal 10' (o.g.); Kovačić (yellow card) 28'; Haaland 42', 55'; Foden 58'; Walker (yellow card) 64' | Report | Füllkrug (yellow card) 14', (goal) 71' | Stadium: City of Manchester Stadium; Attendance: 52,737; Referee: Michael Salisbury |

| 14 January 2025 21 | Brentford | 2–2 | Manchester City | Brentford |
| 19:30 GMT | Wissa 82'; Nørgaard 90+2' | Report | Foden 66', 78' | Stadium: Brentford Community Stadium; Attendance: 17,048; Referee: Anthony Taylor |
Note: Fixture was broadcast live on TNT Sports.

| 19 January 2025 22 | Ipswich Town | 0–6 | Manchester City | Ipswich |
| 16:30 GMT | | Report | Foden 27', 42'; Kovačić 30'; Doku 49'; Haaland 57'; McAtee 69'; Nunes (yellow card) 79' | Stadium: Portman Road; Attendance: 29,841; Referee: Sam Barrott |

| 25 January 2025 23 | Manchester City | 3–1 | Chelsea | Manchester |
| 17:30 GMT | Khusanov (yellow card) 4'; Gvardiol 42'; Haaland 68'; Silva (yellow card) 79'; Kovačić (yellow card) 83'; Foden 87' | Report | Madueke 3'; Colwill (yellow card) 25'; Caicedo (yellow card) 58' | Stadium: City of Manchester Stadium; Attendance: 52,793; Referee: John Brooks |
Note: Fixture was initially scheduled for a 15:00 kick-off, but was moved for live Sky Sports broadcast.

| 2 February 2025 24 | Arsenal | 5–1 | Manchester City | Holloway |
| 16:30 GMT | Ødegaard 2', (yellow card) 71'; Timber (yellow card) 25'; Partey 56'; Lewis-Skelly 62'; Havertz 76'; Nwaneri 90+3' | Report | Haaland 55' | Stadium: Emirates Stadium; Attendance: 60,355; Referee: Peter Bankes |
Note: Fixture was initially scheduled for 1 February, but was moved for live Sky Sports broadcasting.

| 15 February 2025 25 | Manchester City | 4–0 | Newcastle United | Manchester |
| 15:00 GMT | Marmoush 19', 24', 33'; McAtee 84' | Report | Bruno Guimarães (yellow card) 50' | Stadium: City of Manchester Stadium; Attendance: 52,432; Referee: Andrew Madley |

| 23 February 2025 26 | Manchester City | 0–2 | Liverpool | Manchester |
| 16:30 GMT | | Report | Salah 14'; Szoboszlai 37' | Stadium: City of Manchester Stadium; Attendance: 52,803; Referee: Anthony Taylor |
Note: Fixture was initially scheduled for 22 February, but was moved for live Sky Sports broadcasting.

| 26 February 2025 27 | Tottenham Hotspur | 0–1 | Manchester City | Tottenham |
| 19:30 GMT | Bentancur (yellow card) 31'; Maddison (yellow card) 57'; Sarr (yellow card) 87' | Report | Haaland 12' | Stadium: Tottenham Hotspur Stadium; Attendance: 60,820; Referee: Jarred Gillett |
Note: Fixture was initially scheduled for 25 February, but was moved for live TNT Sports broadcasting.

| 8 March 2025 28 | Nottingham Forest | 1–0 | Manchester City | West Bridgford |
| 12:30 GMT | Gibbs-White (yellow card) 27'; Yates (yellow card) 76'; Hudson-Odoi 83', (yellow card) 84' | Report | González (yellow card) 32'; Nunes (yellow card) 56' | Stadium: City Ground; Attendance: 30,252; Referee: Chris Kavanagh |
Note: Fixture was initially scheduled for a 15:00 kick-off, but was moved for live TNT Sports broadcasting.

| 15 March 2025 29 | Manchester City | 2–2 | Brighton & Hove Albion | Manchester |
| 15:00 GMT | Haaland 11' (pen.); Savinho (yellow card) 15'; Marmoush 39'; Doku (yellow card) 61' | Report | João Pedro (yellow card) 10'; Mitoma (yellow card) 18'; Estupiñán 21'; Baleba (yellow card) 26'; Khusanov 48' (o.g.); Wieffer (yellow card) 89'; Verbruggen (yellow card) 90+1' | Stadium: City of Manchester Stadium; Attendance: 52,471; Referee: Simon Hooper |

| 2 April 2025 30 | Manchester City | 2–0 | Leicester City | Manchester |
| 19:45 BST | Grealish 2'; Marmoush 29'; González (yellow card) 80' | Report | Vardy (yellow card) 34'; Justin (yellow card) 71'; Thomas (yellow card) 77'; Skipp (yellow card) 89' | Stadium: City of Manchester Stadium; Attendance: 51,983; Referee: Darren England |

| 6 April 2025 31 | Manchester United | 0–0 | Manchester City | Manchester |
| 16:30 BST | Dalot (yellow card) 67'; Mount (yellow card) 75'; Yoro (yellow card) 84' | Report | Dias (yellow card) 1'; Silva (yellow card) 46' | Stadium: Old Trafford; Attendance: 73,738; Referee: John Brooks |
Note: Fixture was initially scheduled for 5 April, but was moved for live Sky Sports broadcasting.

| 12 April 2025 32 | Manchester City | 5–2 | Crystal Palace | Manchester |
| 12:30 BST | De Bruyne 33'; Marmoush 36'; González (yellow card) 40'; Kovačić 47'; McAtee 56', (yellow card) 68'; O'Reilly 79' | Report | Eze 8'; Richards 21'; Kamada (yellow card) 31'; Lacroix (yellow card) 54'; Lerma (yellow card) 90+4' | Stadium: City of Manchester Stadium; Attendance: 52,489; Referee: Jarred Gillett |
Note: Fixture was initially scheduled for a 15:00 kick-off, but was moved for live TNT Sports broadcasting.

| 19 April 2025 33 | Everton | 0–2 | Manchester City | Liverpool |
| 15:00 BST | Keane (yellow card) 55'; Gueye (yellow card) 62'; Iroegbunam (yellow card) 86'; Pickford (yellow card) 90+1' | Report | O'Reilly 84'; Kovačić 90+2' | Stadium: Goodison Park; Attendance: 39,332; Referee: Simon Hooper |

| 22 April 2025 34 | Manchester City | 2–1 | Aston Villa | Manchester |
| 20:00 BST | Silva 7', (yellow card) 86'; Gvardiol (yellow card) 70'; Nunes (yellow card) 77', (goal) 90+4' | Report | Rashford 18' (pen.); Digne (yellow card) 35'; Rogers (yellow card) 50'; Watkins (yellow card) 85' | Stadium: City of Manchester Stadium; Attendance: 52,192; Referee: Craig Pawson |
Note: Fixture was initially scheduled for 26 April, but was then moved for live Sky Sports broadcasting and subsequently moved again due to the teams' involvement in the FA Cup semi-finals.

| 2 May 2025 35 | Manchester City | 1–0 | Wolverhampton Wanderers | Manchester |
| 20:00 BST | De Bruyne 35' | Report | | Stadium: City of Manchester Stadium; Attendance: 52,563; Referee: Peter Bankes |
Note: Fixture was initially scheduled for 3 May, but was moved for live Sky Sports broadcasting.

| 10 May 2025 36 | Southampton | 0–0 | Manchester City | Southampton |
| 15:00 BST | Ugochukwu (yellow card) 43'; Downes (yellow card) 56' | Report | | Stadium: St Mary's Stadium; Attendance: 30,937; Referee: Tim Robinson |

| 20 May 2025 37 | Manchester City | 3–1 | Bournemouth | Manchester |
| 20:00 BST | Marmoush 14'; Silva 38'; Kovačić (red card) 67'; Ederson (yellow card) 68'; González 89' | Report | Huijsen (yellow card) 36'; Araujo (yellow card) 44'; Cook (red card) 73'; Tavernier (yellow card) 88'; Jebbison 90+6' | Stadium: City of Manchester Stadium; Attendance: 52,487; Referee: Thomas Bramall |
Note: Fixture was initially scheduled for 18 May, but was postponed due to Manchester City's involvement in the FA Cup final.

| 25 May 2025 38 | Fulham | 0–2 | Manchester City | Fulham |
| 16:00 BST | | Report | Gündoğan 21'; Haaland 72' (pen.) | Stadium: Craven Cottage; Attendance: 27,671; Referee: Andrew Madley |

=== FA Cup ===
As a Premier League side, Manchester City entered the FA Cup at the third round stage, and were drawn at home to EFL League Two side Salford City. In the fourth round draw, they were handed an away tie against League One side Leyton Orient. The draw for the fifth round was held on 10 February. City were drawn at home to Championship side Plymouth Argyle. The quarter-final draw was made on 2 March, handing City an away trip to face Premier League side Bournemouth.

Win Draw Loss Fixtures

| 11 January 2025 Third round | Manchester City | 8–0 | Salford City | Manchester |
| 17:45 GMT | Doku 8', 69' (pen.); Mubama 20'; O'Reilly 43'; Grealish 49' (pen.); McAtee 62', 72', 81' | Report | Shephard (yellow card) 21'; Tilt (yellow card) 60' | Stadium: City of Manchester Stadium; Attendance: 52,056; Referee: Josh Smith |

| 8 February 2025 Fourth round | Leyton Orient | 1–2 | Manchester City | Leyton |
| 12:15 GMT | Ortega 16' (o.g.); Cooper (yellow card) 77'; Obiero (yellow card) 88' | Report | McAtee (yellow card) 42'; Khusanov 56'; De Bruyne 79' | Stadium: Brisbane Road; Attendance: 8,749; Referee: Darren Bond |

| 1 March 2025 Fifth round | Manchester City | 3–1 | Plymouth Argyle | Manchester |
| 17:45 GMT | O'Reilly 45+1', 76'; De Bruyne 90' | Report | Talovierov 38' | Stadium: City of Manchester Stadium; Attendance: 50,044; Referee: Craig Pawson |

| 30 March 2025 Quarter-finals | Bournemouth | 1–2 | Manchester City | Bournemouth |
| 16:30 BST | Evanilson 21'; Christie (yellow card) 62'; Cook (yellow card) 70'; Kluivert (yellow card) 77' | Report | Haaland (penalty missed) 14', 49'; Khusanov (yellow card) 37'; Marmoush 63'; Nunes (yellow card) 86'; McAtee (yellow card) 90+5' | Stadium: Dean Court; Attendance: 10,954; Referee: Stuart Attwell |
Note: Fixture was broadcast live on ITV1.

| 27 April 2025 Semi-finals | Nottingham Forest | 0–2 | Manchester City | Wembley |
| 16:30 BST | Gibbs-White (yellow card) 65'; Sosa (yellow card) 90+3' | Report | Lewis 2'; Gvardiol 51'; Grealish (yellow card) 55'; O'Reilly (yellow card) 78'; Ortega (yellow card) 87' | Stadium: Wembley Stadium; Attendance: 72,976; Referee: Michael Oliver |
Note: Fixture was broadcast live on ITV One.

| 17 May 2025 Final | Crystal Palace | 1–0 | Manchester City | Wembley |
| 16:30 BST | Eze 16'; Henderson (yellow card) 90+1' | Report | Marmoush (penalty missed) 36'; O'Reilly (yellow card) 66'; Silva (yellow card) 75'; Dias (yellow card) 82'; De Bruyne (yellow card) 85'; Echeverri (yellow card) 90+4' | Stadium: Wembley Stadium; Attendance: 84,163; Referee: Stuart Attwell |

=== EFL Cup ===
As a Premier League team involved in European competition, Manchester City entered the EFL Cup in the third round, and were drawn at home against EFL Championship side Watford. In the fourth round, they were drawn away to fellow Premier League side Tottenham Hotspur.

| 24 September 2024 Third round | Manchester City | 2–1 | Watford | Manchester |
| 19:45 BST | Doku 5'; Nunes 38' | Report | Ince 86' | Stadium: City of Manchester Stadium; Attendance: 40,584; Referee: David Webb |

| 30 October 2024 Fourth round | Tottenham Hotspur | 2–1 | Manchester City | Tottenham |
| 20:15 GMT | Werner 5'; Sarr (yellow card) 23', (goal) 25'; Bissouma (yellow card) 53'; Gray (yellow card) 90' | Report | Nunes 45+4' | Stadium: Tottenham Hotspur Stadium; Attendance: 60,797; Referee: Robert Jones |

=== FA Community Shield ===
As the defending Premier League champions, Manchester City faced reigning FA Cup winners Manchester United in the traditional season opener. United previously defeated City in the FA Cup final earlier that year.

| 10 August 2024 Final | Manchester City | 1–1 (7–6 p) | Manchester United | Wembley |
| 15:00 BST | Nunes (yellow card) 68'; Silva (yellow card) 85', (goal) 89' | Report | Garnacho 82', (yellow card) 85' | Stadium: Wembley Stadium; Attendance: 78,146; Referee: Jarred Gillett |
| | Penalties |
| | Silva (penalty missed); De Bruyne (penalty scored); Haaland (penalty scored); Savinho (penalty scored); Ederson (penalty scored); Nunes (penalty scored); Dias (penalty scored); Akanji (penalty scored) | | (penalty scored) Fernandes; (penalty scored) Dalot; (penalty scored) Garnacho; (penalty missed) Sancho; (penalty scored) Casemiro; (penalty scored) McTominay; (penalty scored) Martínez; (penalty missed) Evans |

=== UEFA Champions League ===
==== League phase ====
The league phase draw was held on 29 August 2024.

| Pos | Team | Pld | W | D | L | GF | GA | GD | Pts | Qualification |
|---|---|---|---|---|---|---|---|---|---|---|
| 20 | (Italian Football Federation) Juventus | 8 | 3 | 3 | 2 | 9 | 7 | +2 | 12 | Advance to knockout phase play-offs (unseeded) |
| 21 | (Scottish Football Association) Celtic | 8 | 3 | 3 | 2 | 13 | 14 | −1 | 12 | Advance to knockout phase play-offs (unseeded) |
| 22 | (The Football Association) Manchester City | 8 | 3 | 2 | 3 | 18 | 14 | +4 | 11 | Advance to knockout phase play-offs (unseeded) |
| 23 | (Portuguese Football Federation) Sporting CP | 8 | 3 | 2 | 3 | 13 | 12 | +1 | 11 | Advance to knockout phase play-offs (unseeded) |
| 24 | (Royal Belgian Football Association) Club Brugge | 8 | 3 | 2 | 3 | 7 | 11 | −4 | 11 | Advance to knockout phase play-offs (unseeded) |

Source: UEFA
Rules for classification: League phase tiebreakers

| Round | 1 | 2 | 3 | 4 | 5 | 6 | 7 | 8 |
|---|---|---|---|---|---|---|---|---|
| Ground | H | A | H | A | H | A | A | H |
| Result | D | W | W | L | D | L | L | W |
| Position | 16 | 8 | 3 | 10 | 17 | 22 | 25 | 22 |
| Points | 1 | 4 | 7 | 7 | 8 | 8 | 8 | 11 |

Source: UEFA
A = Away; H = Home; W = Win; D = Draw; L = Loss

| 18 September 2024 1 | Manchester City (England) | 0–0 | (Italy) Inter Milan | Manchester, England |
| 20:00 BST | Dias (yellow card) 33' | Report | | Stadium: City of Manchester Stadium; Attendance: 50,922; Referee: Glenn Nyberg (Sweden) |

| 1 October 2024 2 | Slovan Bratislava (Slovakia) | 0–4 | (England) Manchester City | Bratislava, Slovakia |
| 21:00 CEST | | Report | Gündoğan 8'; Foden 15'; Haaland 58'; McAtee 74' | Stadium: Tehelné pole Attendance: 22,500; Referee: Davide Massa (Italy) |

| 23 October 2024 3 | Manchester City (England) | 5–0 | (Czech Republic) Sparta Prague | Manchester, England |
| 20:00 BST | Foden 3'; Stones (yellow card) 7', (goal) 64'; Haaland 58', 68'; Nunes 88' (pen.) | Report | Preciado (yellow card) 87' | Stadium: City of Manchester Stadium; Attendance: 50,116; Referee: Maurizio Mariani (Italy) |

| 5 November 2024 4 | Sporting CP (Portugal) | 4–1 | (England) Manchester City | Lisbon, Portugal |
| 20:00 WET | Gyökeres 38', 49' (pen.), 81' (pen.); Araújo 46', (yellow card) 73'; Gonçalves (yellow card) 55'; Hjulmand (yellow card) 88' | Report | Foden 4'; Kovačić (yellow card) 45'; Haaland (penalty missed) 69'; Savinho (yellow card) 73'; Nunes (yellow card) 79' | Stadium: Estádio José Alvalade; Attendance: 47,453; Referee: Daniel Siebert (Germany) |

| 26 November 2024 5 | Manchester City (England) | 3–3 | (Netherlands) Feyenoord | Manchester, England |
| 20:00 GMT | Haaland 44' (pen.), 53'; Gündoğan 50'; McAtee (yellow card) 88' | Report | Carranza (yellow card) 57'; Hadj Moussa 75'; Giménez 82'; Hancko 89' | Stadium: City of Manchester Stadium; Attendance: 47,011; Referee: Radu Petrescu (Romania) |

| 11 December 2024 6 | Juventus (Italy) | 2–0 | (England) Manchester City | Turin, Italy |
| 21:00 CET | Vlahović 53'; McKennie 75'; Di Gregorio (yellow card) 85' | Report | Grealish (yellow card) 84'; Silva (yellow card) 86' | Stadium: Juventus Stadium; Attendance: 40,890; Referee: Clément Turpin (France) |

| 22 January 2025 7 | Paris Saint-Germain (France) | 4–2 | (England) Manchester City | Paris, France |
| 21:00 CET | Mendes (yellow card) 23'; Dembélé 56'; Barcola 60'; Neves 78'; Ramos 90+3' | Report | Dias (yellow card) 9'; Grealish 50'; Haaland 53' | Stadium: Parc des Princes; Attendance: 47,818; Referee: Szymon Marciniak (Poland) |

| 29 January 2025 8 | Manchester City (England) | 3–1 | (Belgium) Club Brugge | Manchester, England |
| 20:00 GMT | Kovačić 53'; Ordóñez 62' (o.g.); Savinho 77' | Report | Onyedika 45' | Stadium: City of Manchester Stadium; Attendance: 51,237; Referee: José María Sánchez Martínez (Spain) |

==== Knockout phase ====
===== Knockout phase play-offs =====
By finishing 22nd in the league phase, Manchester City entered the knockout phase play-offs instead of qualifying directly for the round of 16. They were unseeded and would be drawn against one of the sides that finished in 11th or 12th place, namely Real Madrid or Bayern Munich, respectively. The draw on 31 January confirmed Madrid as their opponents. The two teams would meet for the fourth consecutive season in the knockout stages.

| 11 February 2025 First leg | Manchester City (England) | 2–3 | (Spain) Real Madrid | Manchester, England |
| 20:00 GMT | Haaland 19', 80' (pen.) | Report | Mbappé 60'; Brahim 86'; Bellingham 90+2' | Stadium: City of Manchester Stadium; Attendance: 52,081; Referee: Clément Turpin (France) |

| 19 February 2025 Second leg | Real Madrid (Spain) | 3–1 (6–3 agg.) | (England) Manchester City | Madrid, Spain |
| 21:00 CET | Mbappé 4', 33', 61'; Bellingham (yellow card) 38' | Report | Gündoğan (yellow card) 28'; González (yellow card) 47', (goal) 90+2' | Stadium: Santiago Bernabéu; Attendance: 77,023; Referee: István Kovács (Romania) |

=== FIFA Club World Cup ===
Manchester City qualified for the revamped tournament as winners of the 2022–23 UEFA Champions League. Their opponents were confirmed on 5 December, with the fixture dates announced two days later.

==== Group stage ====
The group stage draw was held on 5 December 2024.

| Pos | Team | Pld | W | D | L | GF | GA | GD | Pts | Qualification |
|---|---|---|---|---|---|---|---|---|---|---|
| 1 | (England) Manchester City | 3 | 3 | 0 | 0 | 13 | 2 | +11 | 9 | Advance to knockout stage |
| 2 | (Italy) Juventus | 3 | 2 | 0 | 1 | 11 | 6 | +5 | 6 | Advance to knockout stage |
| 3 | (United Arab Emirates) Al Ain | 3 | 1 | 0 | 2 | 2 | 12 | −10 | 3 | |
| 4 | (Morocco) Wydad AC | 3 | 0 | 0 | 3 | 2 | 8 | −6 | 0 | |

Source: FIFA
Rules for classification: Group stage tiebreakers

| 18 June 2025 1 | Manchester City (England) | 2–0 | (Morocco) Wydad AC | Philadelphia, United States |
| 12:00 EDT | Foden 2'; Doku 42'; Lewis (red card) 88' | Report | Mailula (yellow card) 16' | Stadium: Lincoln Financial Field; Attendance: 37,446; Referee: Ramon Abatti (Brazil) |

| 22 June 2025 2 | Manchester City (England) | 6–0 | (United Arab Emirates) Al Ain | Atlanta, United States |
| 21:00 EDT | Gündoğan 8', 73'; Echeverri 27'; Haaland 45+5' (pen.); Khusanov (yellow card) 58'; Bobb 84'; Cherki 89' | Report | Zabala (yellow card) 25'; Rabia (yellow card) 45+4' | Stadium: Mercedes-Benz Stadium; Attendance: 40,392; Referee: Mustapha Ghorbal (Algeria) |

| 26 June 2025 3 | Juventus (Italy) | 2–5 | (England) Manchester City | Orlando, United States |
| 15:00 EDT | Koopmeiners 11'; Kalulu (yellow card) 64'; Vlahović 84' | Report | Doku 9'; Kalulu 26' (o.g.); Haaland 52'; Foden 69'; Savinho 75' | Stadium: Camping World Stadium; Attendance: 54,320; Referee: Clément Turpin (France) |

==== Knockout stage ====
| 30 June 2025 Round of 16 | Manchester City (England) | 3–4 (a.e.t.) | (Saudi Arabia) Al-Hilal | Orlando, United States |
| 21:00 EDT | Silva 9'; Gvardiol (yellow card) 27'; Nunes (yellow card) 39'; Haaland 55'; Foden 104'; Akanji (yellow card) 105+1' | Report | Marcos Leonardo 46', 112', (yellow card) 113'; Malcom 52'; Koulibaly 94' | Stadium: Camping World Stadium; Attendance: 42,311; Referee: Jesús Valenzuela (Venezuela) |

== Statistics ==
=== Overall ===
As of match played 30 June 2025

Appearances numbers are for appearances in competitive games only, including substitute appearances.
Red card numbers denote: numbers in parentheses represent red cards overturned for wrongful dismissal.
Source for all stats:

| No. | Player | Pos. | Premier League | | | | FA Cup | | | | EFL Cup | | | | UEFA Champions League | | | | Other competitions (Note: Includes the FA Community Shield and FIFA Club World Cup.) | | | | Total | | | |
| No. | Player | Pos. | 👕 | Goal | Yellow card | Red card | 👕 | Goal | Yellow card | Red card | 👕 | Goal | Yellow card | Red card | 👕 | Goal | Yellow card | Red card | 👕 | Goal | Yellow card | Red card | 👕 | Goal | Yellow card | Red card |
|---|---|---|---|---|---|---|---|---|---|---|---|---|---|---|---|---|---|---|---|---|---|---|---|---|---|---|
| 3 | (Portugal) Rúben Dias | DF | 27 | | 4 | | 5 | | 1 | | 1 | | | | 7 | | 2 | | 4 | | | | 44 | | 7 | |
| 4 | (Netherlands) Tijjani Reijnders | MF | | | | | | | | | | | | | | | | | 3 | | | | 3 | | | |
| 5 | (England) John Stones | DF | 11 | 2 | 1 | | 1 | | | | 2 | | | | 6 | 1 | 1 | | | | | | 20 | 3 | 2 | |
| 6 | (Netherlands) Nathan Aké | DF | 10 | | | | 2 | | | | 1 | | | | 4 | | | | 3 | | | | 20 | | | |
| 7 | (Egypt) Omar Marmoush | FW | 16 | 7 | | | 4 | 1 | 1 | | | | | | 2 | | | | 3 | | | | 25 | 8 | 1 | |
| 8 | (Croatia) Mateo Kovačić | MF | 31 | 6 | 5 | 1 | 3 | | | | 1 | | | | 6 | 1 | 1 | | 1 | | | | 43 | 7 | 6 | 1 |
| 9 | (Norway) Erling Haaland | FW | 31 | 22 | 2 | | 3 | 1 | | | | | | | 9 | 8 | | | 5 | 3 | | | 48 | 34 | 2 | |
| 10 | (England) Jack Grealish | MF | 20 | 1 | 3 | | 5 | 1 | 1 | | 1 | | | | 6 | 1 | 1 | | | | | | 32 | 3 | 5 | |
| 11 | (Belgium) Jérémy Doku | MF | 29 | 3 | 1 | | 6 | 3 | | | 1 | 1 | | | 4 | | | | 4 | 2 | | | 40 | 9 | 1 | |
| 13 | (England) Marcus Bettinelli | GK | | | | | | | | | | | | | | | | | | | | | | | | |
| 14 | (Spain) Nico González | MF | 11 | 1 | 3 | | 4 | | | | | | | | 1 | 1 | 1 | | 1 | | | | 17 | 2 | 4 | |
| 16 | (Spain) Rodri | MF | 3 | | | | | | | | | | | | 1 | | | | 4 | | | | 8 | | | |
| 17 | (Belgium) Kevin De Bruyne | MF | 28 | 4 | 2 | | 4 | 2 | 1 | | | | | | 8 | | | | 1 | | | | 39 | 6 | 3 | |
| 18 | (Germany) Stefan Ortega | GK | 13 | | 1 | | 4 | | 1 | | 2 | | | | 2 | | | | 1 | | | | 22 | | 2 | |
| 19 | (Germany) İlkay Gündoğan | MF | 33 | 1 | 1 | | 6 | | | | 1 | | | | 10 | 2 | 1 | | 3 | 2 | | | 53 | 5 | 2 | |
| 20 | (Portugal) Bernardo Silva | MF | 33 | 4 | 7 | | 5 | | 1 | | 1 | | | | 9 | | 1 | | 4 | 2 | 1 | | 52 | 6 | 10 | |
| 21 | (Algeria) Rayan Aït-Nouri | DF | | | | | | | | | | | | | | | | | 3 | | | | 3 | | | |
| 22 | (Brazil) Vitor Reis | DF | 1 | | | | 2 | | | | | | | | | | | | 1 | | | | 4 | | | |
| 24 | (Croatia) Joško Gvardiol | DF | 37 | 5 | 2 | | 3 | 1 | | | 2 | | | | 10 | | | | 3 | | 1 | | 55 | 6 | 3 | |
| 25 | (Switzerland) Manuel Akanji | DF | 26 | | 3 | | 2 | | | | | | | | 8 | | | | 2 | | 1 | | 40 | | 4 | |
| 26 | (Brazil) Savinho | MF | 29 | 1 | 4 | | 4 | | | | 2 | | | | 9 | 1 | 1 | | 4 | 1 | | | 48 | 3 | 4 | |
| 27 | (Portugal) Matheus Nunes | MF | 26 | 1 | 4 | | 3 | | 1 | | 2 | 2 | | | 7 | 1 | 1 | | 5 | | 2 | | 43 | 4 | 8 | |
| 29 | (France) Rayan Cherki | MF | | | | | | | | | | | | | | | | | 4 | 1 | | | 4 | 1 | | |
| 30 | (Argentina) Claudio Echeverri | MF | 1 | | | | 1 | | 1 | | | | | | | | | | 1 | 1 | | | 3 | 1 | 1 | |
| 31 | (Brazil) Ederson | GK | 26 | | 4 | | 2 | | | | | | | | 8 | | | | 4 | | | | 40 | | 4 | |
| 33 | (England) Scott Carson | GK | | | | | | | | | | | | | | | | | | | | | | | | |
| 45 | (Uzbekistan) Abdukodir Khusanov | DF | 6 | | 1 | | 2 | 1 | 1 | | | | | | 1 | | | | 1 | | 1 | | 10 | 1 | 3 | |
| 47 | (England) Phil Foden | MF | 28 | 7 | 2 | | 6 | | | | 2 | | | | 9 | 3 | | | 4 | 3 | | | 49 | 13 | 2 | |
| 52 | (Norway) Oscar Bobb | MF | 3 | | | | | | | | | | | | | | | | 3 | 1 | | | 6 | 1 | | |
| 56 | (England) Jacob Wright | MF | | | | | | | | | 2 | | | | | | | | | | | | 2 | | | |
| 61 | (England) Kaden Braithwaite | DF | | | | | | | | | 1 | | | | | | | | | | | | 1 | | | |
| 66 | (England) Jahmai Simpson-Pusey | DF | 2 | | 1 | | 1 | | | | 1 | | | | 2 | | | | | | | | 6 | | 1 | |
| 67 | (England) Divin Mubama | FW | 1 | | | | 1 | 1 | | | | | | | | | | | | | | | 2 | 1 | | |
| 75 | (England) Nico O'Reilly | MF | 9 | 2 | | | 5 | 3 | 2 | | 2 | | | | 1 | | | | 3 | | | | 20 | 5 | 2 | |
| 82 | (England) Rico Lewis | DF | 28 | 1 | 3 | 1 | 3 | 1 | | | 2 | | | | 9 | | | | 2 | | | 1 | 44 | 2 | 3 | 2 |
| 87 | (England) James McAtee | MF | 15 | 3 | 1 | | 4 | 3 | 2 | | 2 | | | | 5 | 1 | 1 | | 1 | | | | 27 | 7 | 4 | |
| Loan | (England) Kyle Walker | DF | 15 | | 3 | | | | | | 1 | | | | 2 | | | | | | | | 18 | | 3 | |
| Own goals | | | | 1 | | | | 0 | | | | 0 | | | | 1 | | | | 1 | | | | 3 | | |
| Totals | | | | 72 | 57 | 2 | | 17 | 12 | 0 | | 3 | 0 | 0 | | 21 | 11 | 0 | | 17 | 6 | 1 | | 130 | 86 | 3 |

=== Goalscorers ===
As of match played 30 June 2025

Includes all competitive matches. The list is sorted alphabetically by surname when total goals are equal.

| Rank | No. | Pos. | Player | Premier League | FA Cup | EFL Cup | FA Community Shield | UEFA Champions League | FIFA Club World Cup | Total |
|---|---|---|---|---|---|---|---|---|---|---|
| 1 | 9 | FW | (Norway) Erling Haaland | 22 | 1 | 0 | 0 | 8 | 3 | 34 |
| 2 | 47 | MF | (England) Phil Foden | 7 | 0 | 0 | 0 | 3 | 3 | 13 |
| 3 | 11 | MF | (Belgium) Jérémy Doku | 3 | 2 | 1 | 0 | 0 | 2 | 8 |
| 3 | 7 | FW | (Egypt) Omar Marmoush | 7 | 1 | 0 | 0 | 0 | 0 | 8 |
| 5 | 8 | MF | (Croatia) Mateo Kovačić | 6 | 0 | 0 | 0 | 1 | 0 | 7 |
| 5 | 87 | MF | (England) James McAtee | 3 | 3 | 0 | 0 | 1 | 0 | 7 |
| 7 | 17 | MF | (Belgium) Kevin De Bruyne | 4 | 2 | 0 | 0 | 0 | 0 | 6 |
| 7 | 24 | DF | (Croatia) Joško Gvardiol | 5 | 1 | 0 | 0 | 0 | 0 | 6 |
| 7 | 20 | MF | (Portugal) Bernardo Silva | 4 | 0 | 0 | 1 | 0 | 1 | 6 |
| 10 | 19 | MF | (Germany) İlkay Gündoğan | 1 | 0 | 0 | 0 | 2 | 2 | 5 |
| 10 | 75 | MF | (England) Nico O'Reilly | 2 | 3 | 0 | 0 | 0 | 0 | 5 |
| 12 | 27 | MF | (Portugal) Matheus Nunes | 1 | 0 | 2 | 0 | 1 | 0 | 4 |
| 13 | 10 | MF | (England) Jack Grealish | 1 | 1 | 0 | 0 | 1 | 0 | 3 |
| 13 | 26 | FW | (Brazil) Savinho | 1 | 0 | 0 | 0 | 1 | 1 | 3 |
| 13 | 5 | DF | (England) John Stones | 2 | 0 | 0 | 0 | 1 | 0 | 3 |
| 16 | 14 | MF | (Spain) Nico González | 1 | 0 | 0 | 0 | 1 | 0 | 2 |
| 16 | 82 | DF | (England) Rico Lewis | 1 | 1 | 0 | 0 | 0 | 0 | 2 |
| 18 | 52 | MF | (Norway) Oscar Bobb | 0 | 0 | 0 | 0 | 0 | 1 | 1 |
| 18 | 29 | MF | (France) Rayan Cherki | 0 | 0 | 0 | 0 | 0 | 1 | 1 |
| 18 | 30 | MF | (Argentina) Claudio Echeverri | 0 | 0 | 0 | 0 | 0 | 1 | 1 |
| 18 | 45 | DF | (Uzbekistan) Abdukodir Khusanov | 0 | 1 | 0 | 0 | 0 | 0 | 1 |
| 18 | 67 | FW | (England) Divin Mubama | 0 | 1 | 0 | 0 | 0 | 0 | 1 |
| Own goals | | | | 1 | 0 | 0 | 0 | 1 | 1 | 3 |
| Totals | | | | 72 | 17 | 3 | 1 | 21 | 16 | 130 |

=== Assists ===
As of match played 30 June 2025

Includes all competitive matches. The list is sorted alphabetically by surname when assists are equal.

| Rank | No. | Pos. | Player | Premier League | FA Cup | EFL Cup | FA Community Shield | UEFA Champions League | FIFA Club World Cup | Total |
|---|---|---|---|---|---|---|---|---|---|---|
| 1 | 27 | MF | (Portugal) Matheus Nunes | 6 | 1 | 0 | 0 | 3 | 1 | 11 |
| 1 | 26 | FW | (Brazil) Savinho | 8 | 0 | 1 | 0 | 1 | 1 | 11 |
| 3 | 11 | MF | (Belgium) Jérémy Doku | 6 | 2 | 0 | 0 | 1 | 0 | 9 |
| 4 | 17 | FW | (Belgium) Kevin De Bruyne | 7 | 1 | 0 | 0 | 0 | 0 | 8 |
| 5 | 19 | MF | (Germany) İlkay Gündoğan | 6 | 0 | 0 | 0 | 0 | 1 | 7 |
| 6 | 47 | MF | (England) Phil Foden | 2 | 2 | 0 | 0 | 1 | 1 | 6 |
| 7 | 10 | MF | (England) Jack Grealish | 1 | 3 | 1 | 0 | 0 | 0 | 5 |
| 7 | 9 | FW | (Norway) Erling Haaland | 3 | 1 | 0 | 0 | 0 | 1 | 5 |
| 7 | 82 | DF | (England) Rico Lewis | 2 | 1 | 1 | 0 | 1 | 0 | 5 |
| 7 | 20 | MF | (Portugal) Bernardo Silva | 4 | 0 | 0 | 0 | 0 | 1 | 5 |
| 11 | 31 | GK | (Brazil) Ederson | 4 | 0 | 0 | 0 | 0 | 0 | 4 |
| 12 | 8 | MF | (Croatia) Mateo Kovačić | 2 | 1 | 0 | 0 | 0 | 0 | 3 |
| 13 | 75 | MF | (England) Nico O'Reilly | 0 | 2 | 0 | 0 | 0 | 0 | 2 |
| 13 | 5 | DF | (England) John Stones | 0 | 0 | 0 | 0 | 2 | 0 | 2 |
| 15 | 21 | DF | (Algeria) Rayan Aït-Nouri | 0 | 0 | 0 | 0 | 0 | 1 | 1 |
| 15 | 25 | DF | (Switzerland) Manuel Akanji | 0 | 0 | 0 | 0 | 1 | 0 | 1 |
| 15 | 52 | MF | (Norway) Oscar Bobb | 0 | 0 | 0 | 1 | 0 | 0 | 1 |
| 15 | 29 | MF | (France) Rayan Cherki | 0 | 0 | 0 | 0 | 0 | 1 | 1 |
| 15 | 24 | DF | (Croatia) Joško Gvardiol | 0 | 0 | 0 | 0 | 1 | 0 | 1 |
| 15 | 7 | FW | (Egypt) Omar Marmoush | 0 | 1 | 0 | 0 | 0 | 0 | 1 |
| 15 | 16 | MF | (Spain) Rodri | 0 | 0 | 0 | 0 | 0 | 1 | 1 |
| Totals | | | | 49 | 15 | 3 | 1 | 12 | 9 | 89 |

=== Disciplinary record ===
As of match played 30 June 2025

Includes all competitive matches. The list is sorted alphabetically by surname when total cards are equal.

| Rank | No. | Pos. | Player | Premier League | | | FA Cup | | | EFL Cup | | | FA Community Shield | | | UEFA Champions League | | | FIFA Club World Cup | | | Total | | |
| Rank | No. | Pos. | Player | Yellow card | (yellow card) (yellow-red card) | Red card | Yellow card | (yellow card) (yellow-red card) | Red card | Yellow card | (yellow card) (yellow-red card) | Red card | Yellow card | (yellow card) (yellow-red card) | Red card | Yellow card | (yellow card) (yellow-red card) | Red card | Yellow card | (yellow card) (yellow-red card) | Red card | Yellow card | (yellow card) (yellow-red card) | Red card |
|---|---|---|---|---|---|---|---|---|---|---|---|---|---|---|---|---|---|---|---|---|---|---|---|---|
| 1 | 20 | MF | (Portugal) Bernardo Silva | 7 | 0 | 0 | 1 | 0 | 0 | 0 | 0 | 0 | 1 | 0 | 0 | 1 | 0 | 0 | 0 | 0 | 0 | 10 | 0 | 0 |
| 2 | 27 | MF | (Portugal) Matheus Nunes | 4 | 0 | 0 | 1 | 0 | 0 | 0 | 0 | 0 | 1 | 0 | 0 | 1 | 0 | 0 | 1 | 0 | 0 | 8 | 0 | 0 |
| 3 | 3 | DF | (Portugal) Rúben Dias | 5 | 0 | 0 | 1 | 0 | 0 | 0 | 0 | 0 | 0 | 0 | 0 | 1 | 0 | 0 | 0 | 0 | 0 | 7 | 0 | 0 |
| 4 | 10 | MF | (Croatia) Mateo Kovačić | 5 | 0 | 1 | 0 | 0 | 0 | 0 | 0 | 0 | 0 | 0 | 0 | 1 | 0 | 0 | 0 | 0 | 0 | 6 | 0 | 1 |
| 5 | 10 | MF | (England) Jack Grealish | 3 | 0 | 0 | 1 | 0 | 0 | 0 | 0 | 0 | 0 | 0 | 0 | 2 | 0 | 0 | 0 | 0 | 0 | 6 | 0 | 0 |
| 6 | 25 | DF | (Switzerland) Manuel Akanji | 3 | 0 | 0 | 0 | 0 | 0 | 0 | 0 | 0 | 0 | 0 | 0 | 0 | 0 | 0 | 1 | 0 | 0 | 4 | 0 | 0 |
| 6 | 31 | GK | (Brazil) Ederson | 4 | 0 | 0 | 0 | 0 | 0 | 0 | 0 | 0 | 0 | 0 | 0 | 0 | 0 | 0 | 0 | 0 | 0 | 4 | 0 | 0 |
| 6 | 14 | MF | (Spain) Nico González | 3 | 0 | 0 | 0 | 0 | 0 | 0 | 0 | 0 | 0 | 0 | 0 | 1 | 0 | 0 | 0 | 0 | 0 | 4 | 0 | 0 |
| 6 | 87 | MF | (England) James McAtee | 1 | 0 | 0 | 2 | 0 | 0 | 0 | 0 | 0 | 0 | 0 | 0 | 1 | 0 | 0 | 0 | 0 | 0 | 4 | 0 | 0 |
| 6 | 26 | MF | (Brazil) Savinho | 3 | 0 | 0 | 0 | 0 | 0 | 0 | 0 | 0 | 0 | 0 | 0 | 1 | 0 | 0 | 0 | 0 | 0 | 4 | 0 | 0 |
| 11 | 82 | DF | (England) Rico Lewis | 3 | 1 | 0 | 0 | 0 | 0 | 0 | 0 | 0 | 0 | 0 | 0 | 0 | 0 | 0 | 0 | 0 | 1 | 3 | 1 | 1 |
| 12 | 17 | FW | (Belgium) Kevin De Bruyne | 2 | 0 | 0 | 1 | 0 | 0 | 0 | 0 | 0 | 0 | 0 | 0 | 0 | 0 | 0 | 0 | 0 | 0 | 3 | 0 | 0 |
| 12 | 24 | DF | (Croatia) Joško Gvardiol | 2 | 0 | 0 | 0 | 0 | 0 | 0 | 0 | 0 | 0 | 0 | 0 | 0 | 0 | 0 | 1 | 0 | 0 | 3 | 0 | 0 |
| 12 | 45 | DF | (Uzbekistan) Abdukodir Khusanov | 1 | 0 | 0 | 1 | 0 | 0 | 0 | 0 | 0 | 0 | 0 | 0 | 0 | 0 | 0 | 1 | 0 | 0 | 3 | 0 | 0 |
| 12 | 2 | DF | (England) Kyle Walker | 3 | 0 | 0 | 0 | 0 | 0 | 0 | 0 | 0 | 0 | 0 | 0 | 0 | 0 | 0 | 0 | 0 | 0 | 3 | 0 | 0 |
| 16 | 47 | MF | (England) Phil Foden | 2 | 0 | 0 | 0 | 0 | 0 | 0 | 0 | 0 | 0 | 0 | 0 | 0 | 0 | 0 | 0 | 0 | 0 | 2 | 0 | 0 |
| 16 | 19 | MF | (Germany) İlkay Gündoğan | 1 | 0 | 0 | 0 | 0 | 0 | 0 | 0 | 0 | 0 | 0 | 0 | 1 | 0 | 0 | 0 | 0 | 0 | 2 | 0 | 0 |
| 16 | 9 | FW | (Norway) Erling Haaland | 2 | 0 | 0 | 0 | 0 | 0 | 0 | 0 | 0 | 0 | 0 | 0 | 0 | 0 | 0 | 0 | 0 | 0 | 2 | 0 | 0 |
| 16 | 18 | GK | (Germany) Stefan Ortega | 1 | 0 | 0 | 1 | 0 | 0 | 0 | 0 | 0 | 0 | 0 | 0 | 0 | 0 | 0 | 0 | 0 | 0 | 2 | 0 | 0 |
| 16 | 75 | MF | (England) Nico O'Reilly | 0 | 0 | 0 | 2 | 0 | 0 | 0 | 0 | 0 | 0 | 0 | 0 | 0 | 0 | 0 | 0 | 0 | 0 | 2 | 0 | 0 |
| 16 | 5 | DF | (England) John Stones | 1 | 0 | 0 | 0 | 0 | 0 | 0 | 0 | 0 | 0 | 0 | 0 | 1 | 0 | 0 | 0 | 0 | 0 | 2 | 0 | 0 |
| 22 | 11 | MF | (Belgium) Jérémy Doku | 1 | 0 | 0 | 0 | 0 | 0 | 0 | 0 | 0 | 0 | 0 | 0 | 0 | 0 | 0 | 0 | 0 | 0 | 1 | 0 | 0 |
| 22 | 30 | MF | (Argentina) Claudio Echeverri | 0 | 0 | 0 | 1 | 0 | 0 | 0 | 0 | 0 | 0 | 0 | 0 | 0 | 0 | 0 | 0 | 0 | 0 | 1 | 0 | 0 |
| 22 | 66 | DF | (England) Jahmai Simpson-Pusey | 1 | 0 | 0 | 0 | 0 | 0 | 0 | 0 | 0 | 0 | 0 | 0 | 0 | 0 | 0 | 0 | 0 | 0 | 1 | 0 | 0 |
| Total | | | | 57 | 1 | 1 | 12 | 0 | 0 | 0 | 0 | 0 | 2 | 0 | 0 | 11 | 0 | 0 | 4 | 0 | 1 | 86 | 1 | 2 |

=== Hat-tricks ===
As of match played 30 June 2025

| Player | Against | Result | Date | Competition | Ref. |
|---|---|---|---|---|---|
| (Norway) Erling Haaland | Ipswich Town (H) | 4–1 | 24 August 2024 | Premier League | |
| (Norway) Erling Haaland | West Ham United (A) | 3–1 | 31 August 2024 | Premier League | |
| (England) James McAtee | Salford City (H) | 8–0 | 11 January 2025 | FA Cup | |
| (Egypt) Omar Marmoush | Newcastle United (H) | 4–0 | 15 February 2025 | Premier League | |

=== Clean sheets ===
As of match played 30 June 2025

The list is sorted by shirt number when total clean sheets are equal. Numbers in parentheses represent matches where both goalkeepers participated and both kept a clean sheet; the number in parentheses is awarded to the goalkeeper who was substituted on, whilst a full clean sheet is awarded to the goalkeeper who was on the field at the start of play.

| | | | | Clean sheets | | | | | | |
| No. | Player | Apps | Goals against | Premier League | FA Cup | EFL Cup | FA Community Shield | UEFA Champions League | FIFA Club World Cup | Total |
|---|---|---|---|---|---|---|---|---|---|---|
| 31 | (Brazil) Ederson | 40 | 54 | 10 | 1 | 0 | 0 | 1 | 1 | 13 |
| 18 | (Germany) Stefan Ortega | 21 (1) | 24 | 3 | 1 | 0 | 0 | 2 | 1 | 7 |
| Totals | | | 78 | 13 | 2 | 0 | 0 | 3 | 2 | 20 |

== Awards ==
=== Etihad Player of the Year ===
| Player | Ref. |
|---|---|
| (Croatia) Joško Gvardiol | |

=== Premier League Player of the Month ===
Awarded by an online vote of supporters on the official Premier League website.

| Month | Player | Ref. |
|---|---|---|
| August | (Norway) Erling Haaland | |

=== Premier League Goal of the Season ===
| Player | Score | Opponents | Ref. |
|---|---|---|---|
| (Egypt) Omar Marmoush | 1–0 | Bournemouth | |

=== Etihad Player of the Month ===
Awarded by an online vote of supporters on the official Manchester City F.C. website.

| Month | Player | Ref. |
|---|---|---|
| August | (Norway) Erling Haaland | |
| September | (Norway) Erling Haaland | |
| October | (England) John Stones | |
| November | (Portugal) Matheus Nunes | |
| December | (Brazil) Savinho | |
| January | (England) Phil Foden | |
| February | (Uzbekistan) Abdukodir Khusanov | |
| March | (Egypt) Omar Marmoush | |
| April | (England) Nico O'Reilly | |
