= James McAtee =

English footballer (born 2002)

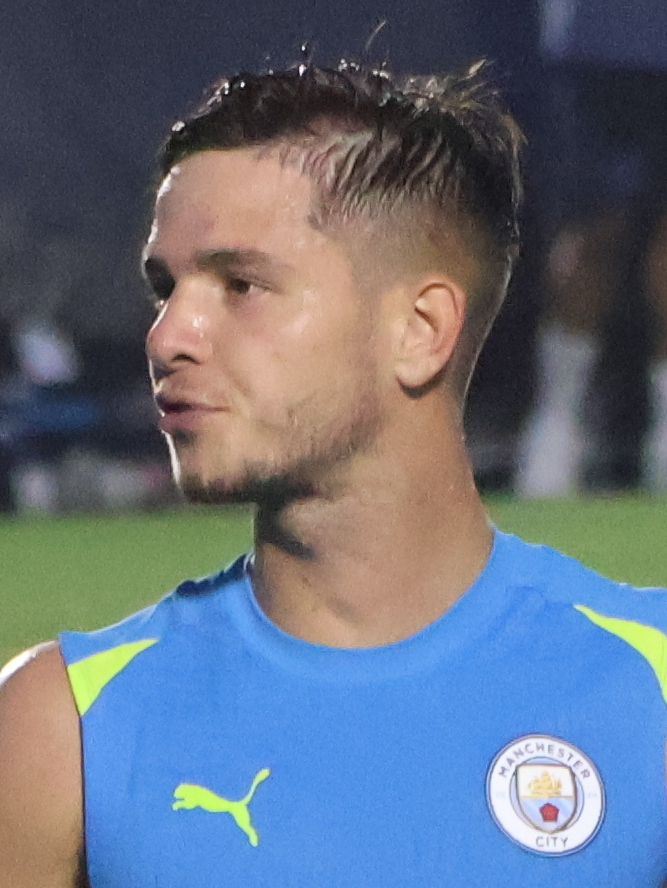
- McAtee with Manchester City in 2025

Personal information
- Full name: James John McAtee
- Date of birth: 18 October 2002 (age 24)
- Place of birth: Salford, England
- Height: 5 ft 11 in (1.80 m)
- Positions: Midfielder; winger

Team information
- Current team: Nottingham Forest
- Number: 24

Youth career
- 2013–2021: Manchester City

Senior career*
Years	Team	Apps	(Gls)
2021–2025	Manchester City	18	(3)
2022–2024	→ Sheffield United (loan)	67	(12)
2025–	Nottingham Forest	23	(0)

International career^{‡}
2019	England U18	3	(2)
2021–2022	England U20	5	(2)
2022–2025	England U21	24	(8)
Medal record
Men's football
Representing England
UEFA European Under-21 Championship
Winner	2025 Slovakia
- * Club domestic league appearances and goals as of 17:02, 31 October 2026 (UTC) ‡ National team caps and goals as of 21:37, 28 June 2025 (UTC)

James John McAtee (born 18 October 2002) is an English professional footballer who plays as a midfielder or winger for Premier League club Nottingham Forest.

== Club career ==
=== Early career ===
McAtee made his first appearance against a senior team for Manchester City's EDS squad in the EFL Trophy defeat against Bolton Wanderers on 29 October 2019. During the 2020–21 season McAtee also played in the EFL Trophy victories over Scunthorpe United, in which he played against his older brother John and Mansfield Town as well as the defeat against Tranmere Rovers. On 24 August 2021, he scored in a 3–0 victory over Scunthorpe United. In the 2021–22 season, he made 28 appearances for the Elite Development Squad (EDS), earning him the Players' Player of the Year award.

In November 2020, McAtee scored in a 3–2 victory against Chelsea in the final of the FA Youth Cup and subsequently scored eight goals with nine assists in twenty-three appearances as City were champions of 2020–21 Premier League 2.

On 21 September 2021, McAtee made his senior debut as a substitute for Josh Wilson-Esbrand in City's 6–1 home win over Wycombe Wanderers in the EFL Cup. On 21 November 2021, McAtee made his Premier League debut as a substitute for Cole Palmer in a 3–0 home win over Everton.

=== Loans to Sheffield United ===
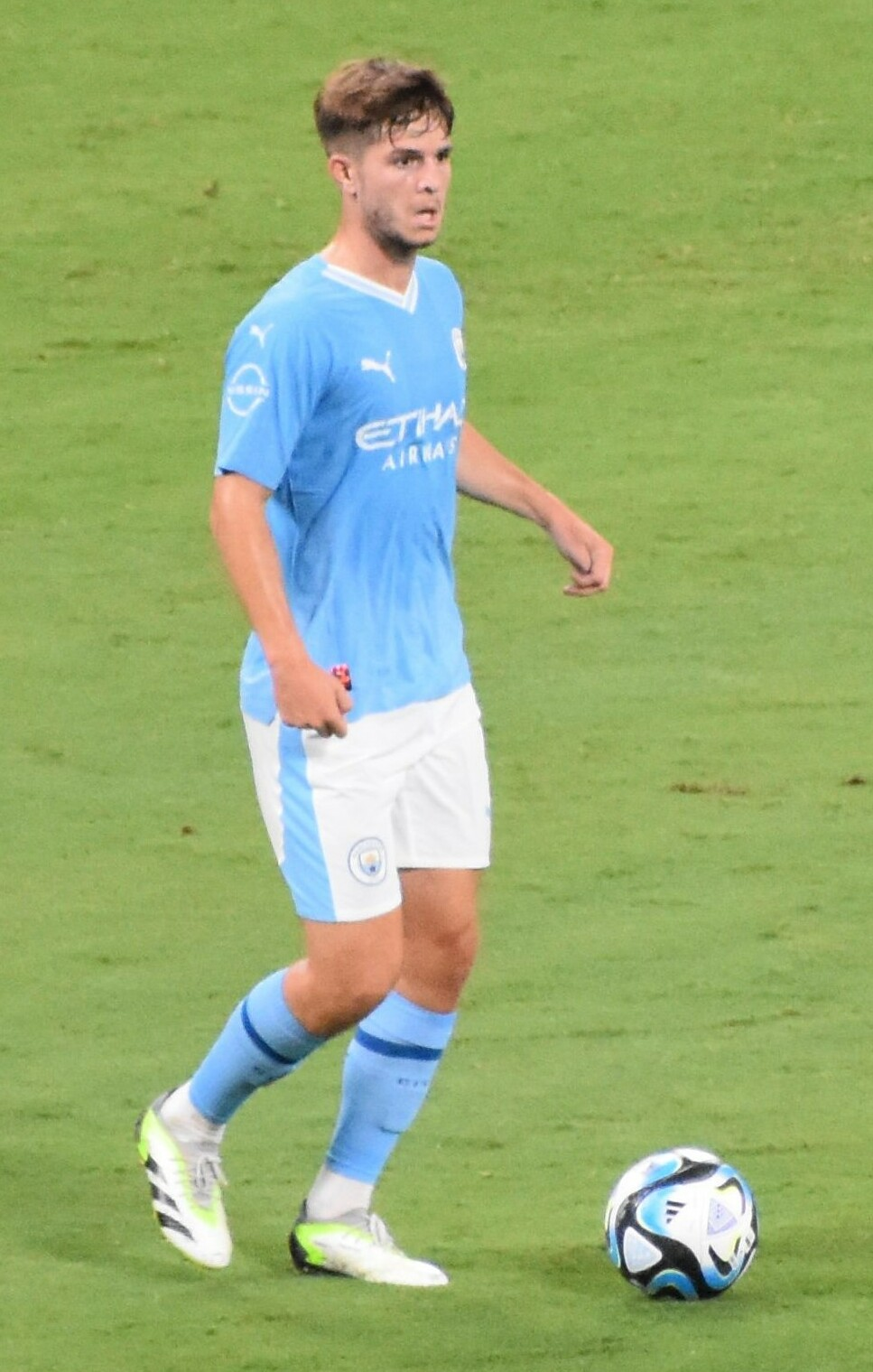
McAtee playing for Manchester City in 2023

On 4 July 2022, McAtee joined Championship club Sheffield United on a season-long loan alongside Manchester City teammate Tommy Doyle. Sheffield United would progress to the FA Cup semi-final to face Manchester City, alongside Doyle, he was unable to play in the semi-final against his parent club due to FA competition rules forbidding loan players from facing their parent clubs.

During pre-season, McAtee returned to City and was part of the first team's squad that travelled to Asia. On 11 August 2023 he came on as an 89th-minute substitute for Kyle Walker in City's opening day Premier League victory at Burnley. On 27 August he was an unused substitute in the 2–1 win away at Sheffield United. Five days later on 1 September, he re-joined Sheffield United on a season-long loan. On 9 December 2023, McAtee scored his first Premier League goal against Brentford, the solo goal in Sheffield United's 1–0 win.

=== Return to Manchester City ===
For the 2024–25 season, McAtee rejoined City and featured in their USA pre-season tour. On 1 October 2024, McAtee scored his first City goal in the UEFA Champions League in a 4–0 win over Slovan Bratislava after coming on as a substitute for Erling Haaland.

On 11 January 2025, McAtee scored the first hat-trick of his career in an 8–0 home victory over Salford City in the FA Cup third round. On 19 January, McAtee scored his first Premier League goal for Manchester City, scoring the sixth goal of a 6–0 away victory at Ipswich Town.

=== Nottingham Forest ===
On 16 August 2025, Premier League club Nottingham Forest announced the signing of McAtee on a five-year contract for a fee close to £30 million.

== International career ==
In November 2019, McAtee made his international debut for England U18 and scored twice in a 4–4 draw with Norway. On 6 September 2021, he scored one of England U20's goals in a 6–1 win over Romania.

On 6 June 2022, McAtee received his first call up to the England U21s. On 10 June 2022, he made his U21 debut during a 2023 UEFA European Under-21 Championship qualification 5–0 victory away to Kosovo. In October 2024 McAtee scored the winning goal during a qualifier against Ukraine.

On 6 June 2025, it was confirmed that McAtee would captain England at the 2025 UEFA European Under-21 Championship. He scored the opening goal of their quarter-final victory over Spain. McAtee was named player of the match in the final as England defeated Germany after extra time to lift the trophy. His performances during the competition resulted in him being chosen by the UEFA Technical Observer panel for their team of the tournament.

== Personal life ==
McAtee is the younger brother of Bolton Wanderers striker John McAtee. They are from Walkden. Their father, paternal grandfather and great-uncles played rugby league professionally, and the football players and managers Alan Ball Sr. and Alan Ball Jr. are their maternal great-grandfather and great-uncle respectively.

== Career statistics ==
As of match played 31 October 2026

Appearances and goals by club, season and competition
Club	Season	League			FA Cup		EFL Cup		Europe		Other		Total	
Club	Season	Division	Apps	Goals	Apps	Goals	Apps	Goals	Apps	Goals	Apps	Goals	Apps	Goals
Manchester City	2021–22	Premier League	2	0	2	0	1	0	1 (Note: Appearance(s) in UEFA Champions League)	0	0	0	6	0
Manchester City	2023–24	Premier League	1	0	—		—		—		0	0	1	0
Manchester City	2024–25	Premier League	15	3	4	3	2	0	5	1	1 (Note: Appearance in FA Community Shield)	0	27	7
Manchester City	Total		18	3	6	3	3	0	6	1	1	0	34	7
Sheffield United (loan)	2022–23	Championship	37	9	5	0	1	0	—		—		43	9
Sheffield United (loan)	2023–24	Premier League	30	3	2	2	—		—		—		32	5
Sheffield United (loan)	Total		67	12	7	2	1	0	—		—		75	14
Nottingham Forest	2025–26	Premier League	14	0	1	0	1	0	10 (Note: Appearances in UEFA Europa League)	1	—		26	1
Nottingham Forest	2026–27	Premier League	9	0	0	0	0	0	—		—		9	0
Nottingham Forest	Total		23	0	1	0	1	0	10	1	—		35	1
Career total			108	15	14	5	5	0	16	2	1	0	144	22

== Honours ==
Manchester City Youth

- FA Youth Cup: 2019–20

Manchester City

- FA Community Shield: 2024
- UEFA Super Cup: 2023

England U21

- UEFA European Under-21 Championship: 2025

Individual

- Manchester City EDS Players' Player of the Year: 2021–22
- Premier League 2 Player of the Month: August 2021
- Premier League 2 Player of the Season: 2021–22
- Sheffield United Young Player of the Year: 2022–23
- UEFA European Under-21 Championship Team of the Tournament: 2025
