= 2024 FA Community Shield =

- The match programme cover
Manchester City	Manchester United
1	1
- Manchester City won 7–6 on penalties
- Date: 10 August 2024
- Venue: Wembley Stadium, London
- Man of the Match: Oscar Bobb (Manchester City)
- Referee: Jarred Gillett
- Attendance: 78,146

The 2024 FA Community Shield was the 102nd FA Community Shield, an annual association football match contested by the winners of the previous season's Premier League and FA Cup competitions. It was played at Wembley Stadium in London on 10 August 2024, and featured the 2023–24 Premier League champions Manchester City and the 2023–24 FA Cup winners Manchester United, who had defeated City in the final.

Arsenal were the holders, having won the 2023 edition, but they did not qualify for this match, having been knocked out of the FA Cup in the third round and having finished second in the league.

Manchester City beat Manchester United 7–6 on penalties after a 1–1 draw in normal time, winning their first Community Shield title since 2019, which they also won on penalties after a 1–1 draw. This was United's first Shield defeat since 2009, when they were beaten by Chelsea, also on penalties.

== Background ==
Manchester City and Manchester United qualified for the 2024 FA Community Shield as the winners of the 2023–24 Premier League and the 2023–24 FA Cup, respectively. It was the 194th Manchester derby to take place in all competitions and the third to take place in the Community Shield; Manchester United won both previous meetings in 1956 (when the competition was known as the Charity Shield) and 2011.

Manchester United had both appeared in and won the most Community Shield matches, winning 21 of their 30 appearances, although this included four shared titles in 1965, 1967, 1977 and 1990; their most recent title came in 2016. Manchester City had appeared in 15 Community Shield matches, winning six titles, the most recent coming in 2019. It was their fourth Community Shield appearance in a row, with the previous three resulting in defeats, making City the first team to lose three straight Community Shields since United in 2001, when they lost a competition record fourth in a row.

== Pre-match ==
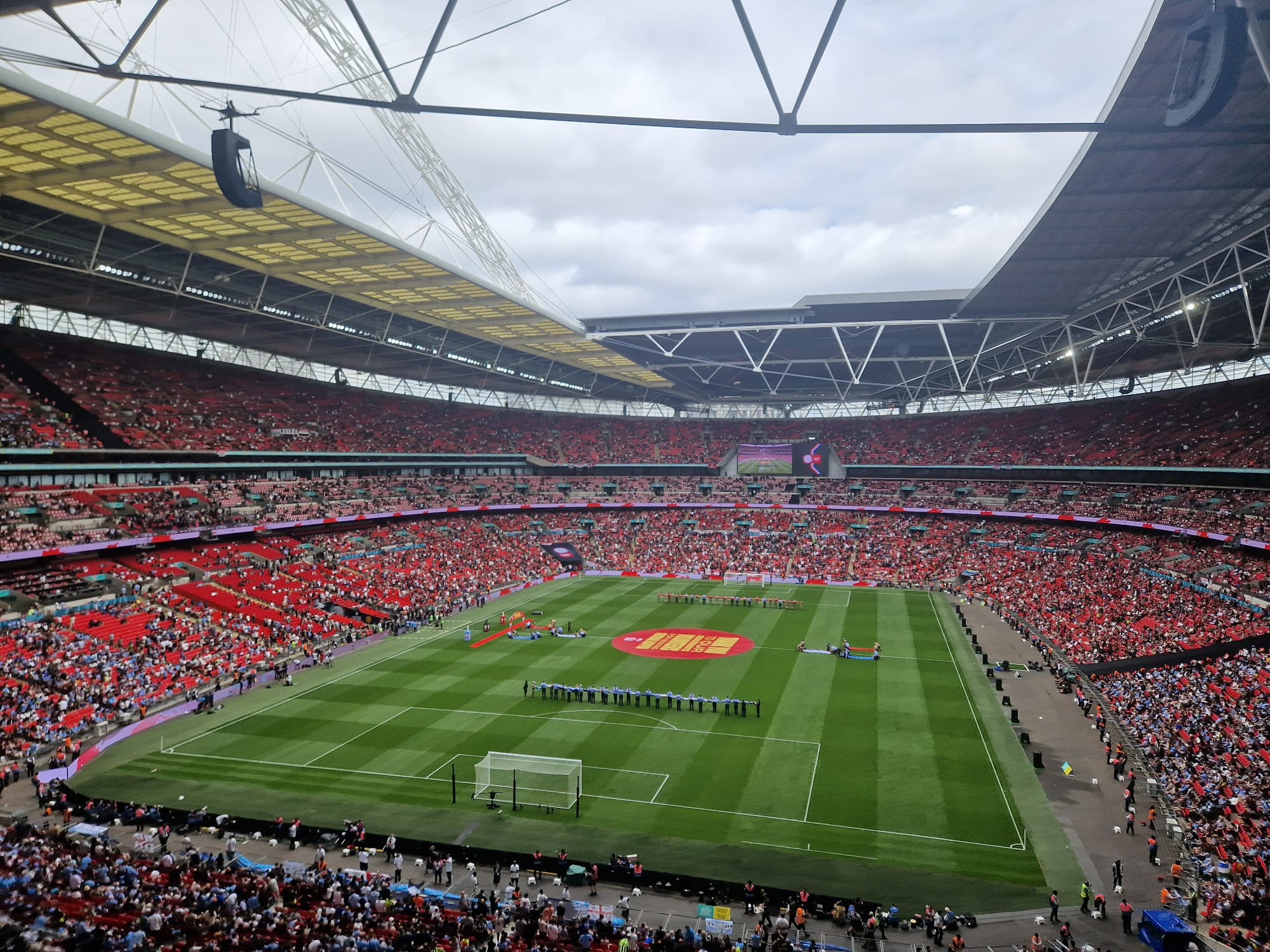
Wembley Stadium before the game

=== Officials ===
John Brooks was originally named as the referee for the Community Shield; however, after Brooks suffered a minor injury in the week before the match, he was replaced by fourth official Jarred Gillett, and Sam Barrott was named as Gillett's replacement. Adrian Holmes and Nick Greenhalgh were named as the assistant referees. The video assistant referee (VAR) was named as Peter Bankes, with Sian Massey-Ellis as the assistant VAR and Tim Robinson as the support VAR.

== Match ==
=== Summary ===
The first half went goalless after City midfielder James McAtee hit the post with a curling shot and United forward Marcus Rashford failed to hit the target after being found unmarked in the box. United thought they had opened the scoring early in the second half, when captain Bruno Fernandes beat Ederson with a dipping shot from the edge of the box; however, he was ruled to have been offside in the build-up. Rashford hit the post with just over 15 minutes left after being played in by substitute Alejandro Garnacho, but the Argentine winger opened the scoring seven minutes later, cutting inside off the right wing and beating Ederson with a left-footed strike into the bottom corner. With just under two minutes left in normal time, though, Bernardo Silva – on his 30th birthday – headed in a cross from Oscar Bobb, forcing the match to go to a penalty shoot-out.

After Fernandes put United 1–0 up in the shoot-out, Silva himself stepped up to take City's first kick, only to see it saved by André Onana. Diogo Dalot and Garnacho then scored for United, while Kevin De Bruyne and Erling Haaland kept City in it, the score 3–2 after three kicks each. With their fourth attempt, United winger and former City academy player Jadon Sancho had his penalty saved by Ederson, allowing Savinho to equalise. After Casemiro scored for United, Ederson himself took City's fifth penalty and scored to take the shoot-out to sudden death. Scott McTominay and Lisandro Martínez both scored for United, matched by efforts from Matheus Nunes and Rúben Dias, but when Jonny Evans put his kick over the bar, that allowed Manuel Akanji to score the winning penalty. That gave City their first Community Shield in five years, avoiding the club a joint-record of four consecutive Shield losses, as well as Pep Guardiola's third victory in the competition.

=== Details ===
10 August 2024
15:00 BST

Manchester City	1–1	Manchester United
Silva 89'	Report	Garnacho 82'
Penalties
Silva (penalty missed); De Bruyne (penalty scored); Haaland (penalty scored); Savinho (penalty scored); Ederson (penalty scored); Nunes (penalty scored); Dias (penalty scored); Akanji (penalty scored)	7–6	(penalty scored) Fernandes; (penalty scored) Dalot; (penalty scored) Garnacho; (penalty missed) Sancho; (penalty scored) Casemiro; (penalty scored) McTominay; (penalty scored) Martínez; (penalty missed) Evans

Wembley Stadium, London
Attendance: 78,146
Referee: Jarred Gillett

Manchester City	Manchester United

GK	31	(Brazil) Ederson
RB	82	(England) Rico Lewis
CB	3	(Portugal) Rúben Dias (c)
CB	25	(Switzerland) Manuel Akanji
LB	24	(Croatia) Joško Gvardiol		(substituted off) 90+1'
CM	75	(England) Nico O'Reilly		(substituted off) 63'
CM	8	(Croatia) Mateo Kovačić
RW	52	(Norway) Oscar Bobb		(substituted off) 90+1'
AM	87	(England) James McAtee		(substituted off) 80'
LW	11	(Belgium) Jérémy Doku		(substituted off) 63'
CF	9	(Norway) Erling Haaland
Substitutes:
GK	18	(Germany) Stefan Ortega
GK	33	(England) Scott Carson
DF	6	(Netherlands) Nathan Aké		(substituted on) 90+1'
DF	78	(Burkina Faso) Issa Kaboré
MF	4	(England) Kalvin Phillips
MF	17	(Belgium) Kevin De Bruyne		(substituted on) 90+1'
MF	20	(Portugal) Bernardo Silva	(yellow card) 85'	(substituted on) 80'
MF	27	(Portugal) Matheus Nunes	(yellow card) 68'	(substituted on) 63'
FW	26	(Brazil) Savinho		(substituted on) 63'
Manager:
(Spain) Pep Guardiola

GK	24	(Cameroon) André Onana
RB	20	(Portugal) Diogo Dalot
CB	5	(England) Harry Maguire	(substituted off) 59'
CB	35	(Northern Ireland) Jonny Evans
LB	6	(Argentina) Lisandro Martínez
CM	7	(England) Mason Mount	(substituted off) 58'
CM	18	(Brazil) Casemiro
CM	37	(England) Kobbie Mainoo	(substituted off) 59'
RF	16	(Ivory Coast) Amad Diallo	(substituted off) 59'
CF	8	(Portugal) Bruno Fernandes (c)
LF	10	(England) Marcus Rashford	(substituted off) 83'
Substitutes:
GK	1	(Turkey) Altay Bayındır
MF	14	(Denmark) Christian Eriksen
MF	39	(Scotland) Scott McTominay	(substituted on) 58'
MF	43	(England) Toby Collyer	(substituted on) 59'
FW	11	(Netherlands) Joshua Zirkzee
FW	17	(Argentina) Alejandro Garnacho	(substituted on) 59'
FW	21	(Brazil) Antony
FW	25	(England) Jadon Sancho	(substituted on) 83'
FW	28	(Uruguay) Facundo Pellistri	(substituted on) 59'
Manager:
(Netherlands) Erik ten Hag

Man of the Match:
Oscar Bobb (Manchester City)

Assistant referees:
Adrian Holmes
Nick Greenhalgh
Fourth official:
Sam Barrott

Reserve Assistant Referee:
Craig Taylor

Video assistant referee:
Peter Bankes
Assistant video assistant referee:
Sian Massey-Ellis
Support video assistant referee:
Tim Robinson

Match rules

- 90 minutes
- Penalty shoot-out if scores level
- Nine named substitutes, of which six may be used

== Broadcasting ==
The match was broadcast on television in the United Kingdom on ITV and its on-demand streaming counterparts, ITVX and STV Player. On radio, it was broadcast on BBC Radio 5 Live, BBC Radio Manchester, the BBC World Service, Talksport and Talksport International.
