= Oscar Bobb =

Norwegian footballer (born 2003)

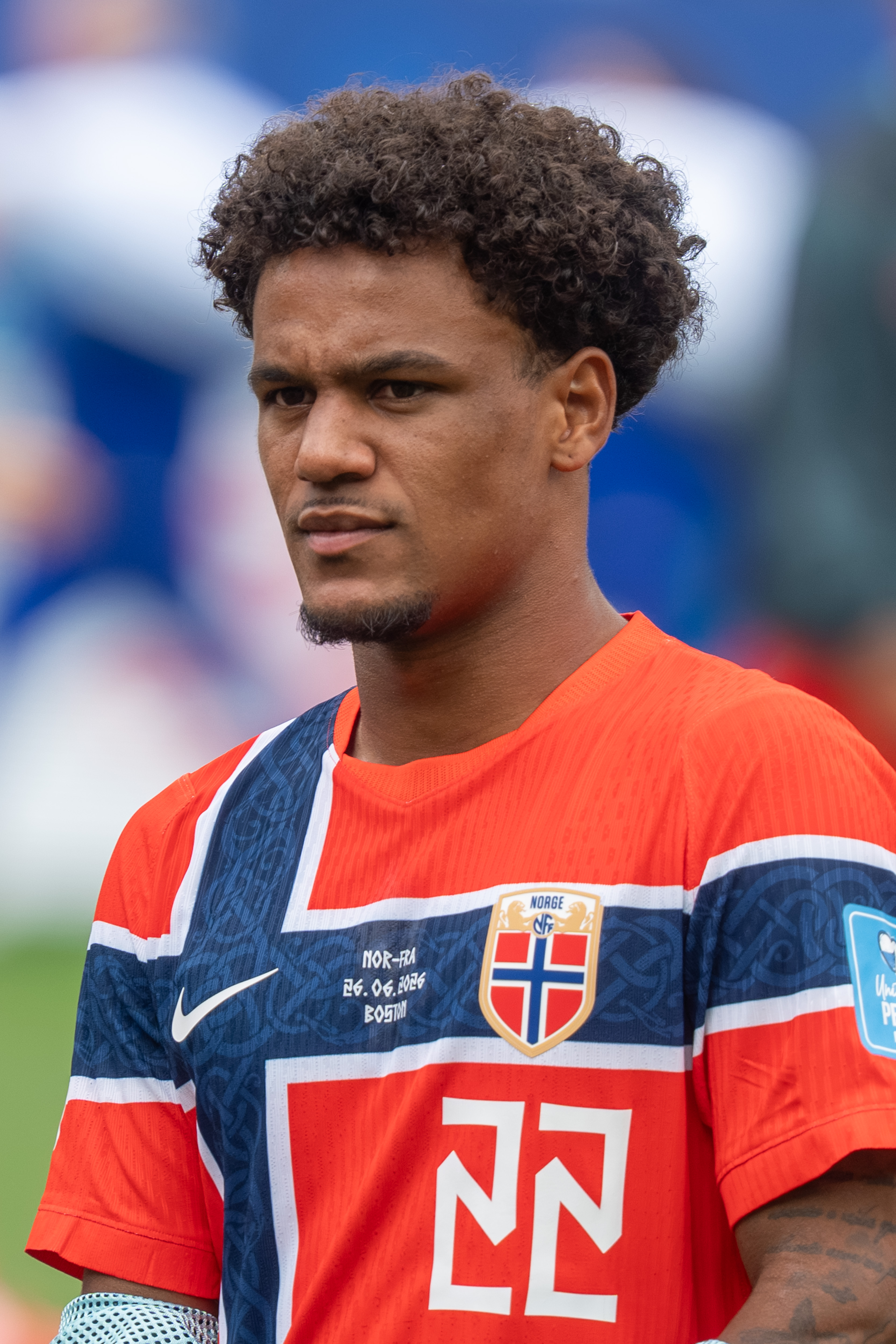
- Bobb with Norway in 2026

Personal information
- Full name: Oscar Bobb
- Date of birth: 12 July 2003 (age 23)
- Place of birth: Oslo, Norway
- Height: 1.74 m (5 ft 9 in)
- Position: Right winger

Team information
- Current team: Fulham
- Number: 14

Youth career
- –2015: Lyn
- 2017–2019: Vålerenga
- 2019–2023: Manchester City

Senior career*
Years	Team	Apps	(Gls)
2023–2026	Manchester City	26	(1)
2026–	Fulham	25	(1)

International career^{‡}
2019	Norway U16	12	(0)
2020	Norway U17	1	(0)
2021	Norway U18	9	(3)
2022	Norway U19	4	(1)
2022–2023	Norway U21	8	(2)
2023–	Norway	32	(4)
- * Club domestic league appearances and goals as of 21:41, 21 November 2026 (UTC) ‡ National team caps and goals as of 17 November 2026

Oscar Bobb (born 12 July 2003) is a Norwegian professional footballer who plays as a right winger for Premier League club Fulham and the Norway national team.

== Early life ==
Bobb was born in Oslo on 12 July 2003. He has Gambian and Norwegian heritage. His father is Abdou Bobb, a Gambian-Norwegian. Bobb was largely raised by his mother, Norwegian actress Turid Gunnes, who had sole custody of him. Bobb began showing prowess for football at an early age.

== Club career ==
=== Early career and move to Portugal ===
Bobb played for Lyn at youth level. In 2013, he began being linked with Portuguese club Porto at the age of 10, after performing well at a youth tournament in Algarve. Porto reached out to Bobb's mother to convince the young footballer to sign with them, even going as far as to pay for the two of them to visit the club in Porto. In October 2015, his mother moved to Portugal on her own, before signing documentation in November of the same year for Bobb to be enrolled in the Portuguese Football Federation.

Despite the documentation being rejected by FIFA in January 2016, Bobb and his mother remained in Porto, and in January 2017 he attempted to sign with Escola de Futebol Hernâni Gonçalves. However, FIFA were neither convinced that Bobb's mother had moved to Portugal of her own volition, to pursue an acting career, nor that the Escola de Futebol Hernâni Gonçalves were independent from Porto, and consequently refused Bobb an international transfer certificate.

The case reached the Court of Arbitration for Sport, who sided with FIFA, and Bobb was told to return to Norway. He would go on to sign for fellow Oslo-based club Vålerenga.

=== Manchester City ===
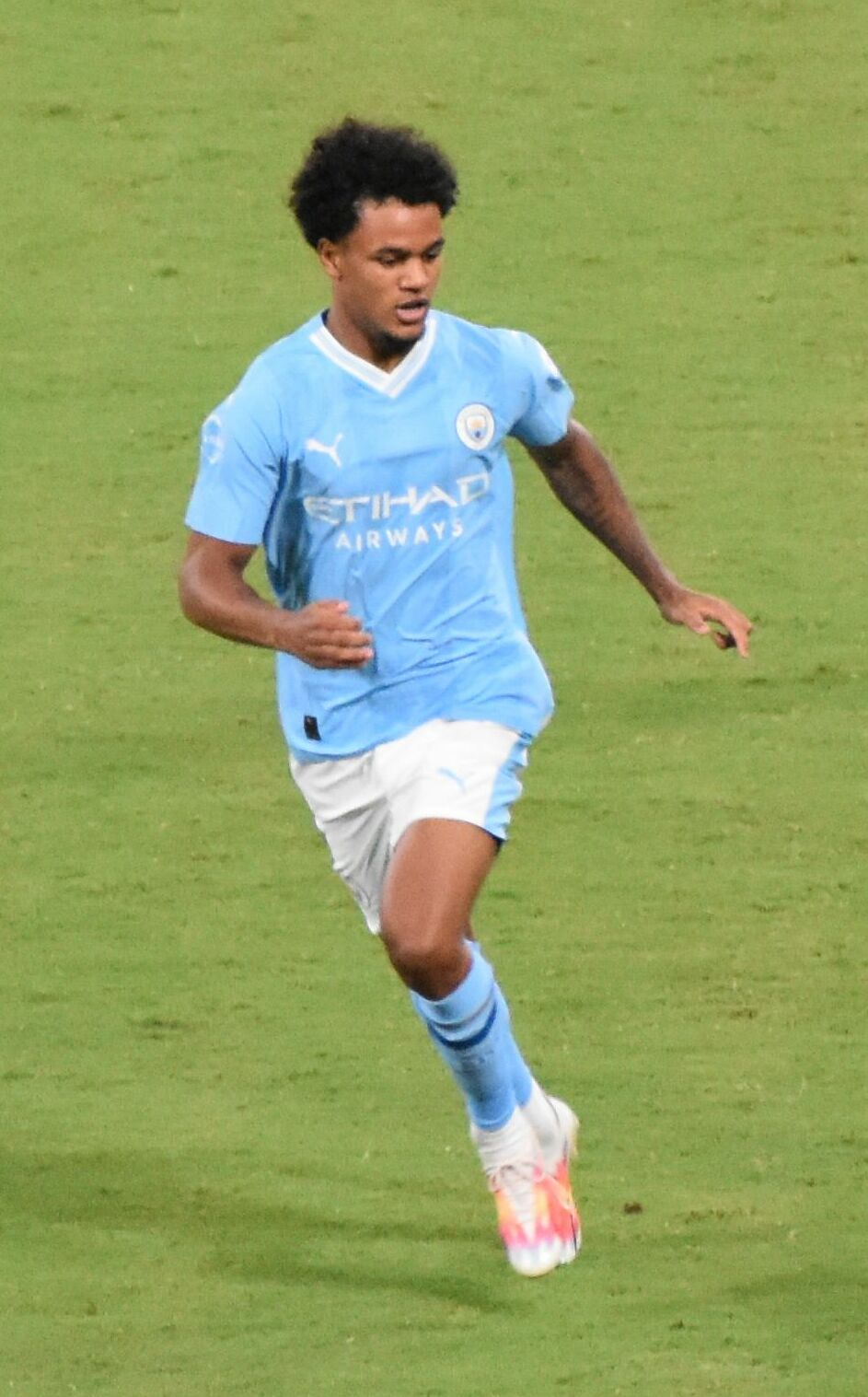
Bobb playing for Manchester City in 2023

Bobb joined Premier League club Manchester City in July 2019. In October of the same year, he was named by English newspaper The Guardian as the best young talent at Manchester City of his age group.

After a relatively slow start, compared to other youth players brought in at the same time, Bobb cemented his place in Manchester City's under-23 side, notching a number of assists in his first full season. As a reward for his fine form for the reserve side, Bobb was named on the Manchester City bench for the first time, in an FA Cup third round tie against Swindon Town on 7 January 2022, though he did not feature.

On 2 September 2023, Bobb was given his Premier League debut against Fulham coming on as an 88th minute substitute for Phil Foden, where he was involved in the buildup leading to the 5th goal scored by fellow Norwegian Erling Haaland. On 19 September, he made his Champions League debut against Red Star Belgrade, replacing Phil Foden in the 83rd minute in a 3–1 win. On 13 December also against Red Star Belgrade, Bobb scored his first Champions League goal in a 3–2 victory. On 13 January 2024, he scored his first Premier League goal in the 91st minute, securing a 3–2 comeback away win over Newcastle United, after a Kevin De Bruyne cross. A month later, on 26 February, he signed a new long-term contract at the club until 2029.

In August 2024, during pre-season training with Manchester City, Bobb suffered a fractured leg that required surgery. The injury was initially expected to sideline him for up to four months. However, manager Pep Guardiola later confirmed that while the fracture had healed, Bobb was not yet ready to return to matches and was only taking part in partial team training by January 2025.

In late April 2025, Bobb suffered a hamstring injury in training, forcing him to miss the FA Cup semi-final and several matches late in the season. He returned to team training at the end of the season and rejoined the squad for the 2025 FIFA Club World Cup. On 22 June, he scored his first goal since his return from injury in City's 6–0 group stage win against Al Ain after coming on as a substitute.

=== Fulham ===
Bobb joined Premier League club Fulham in January 2026, agreeing a five-and-a-half-year deal for £27m. He made his Fulham debut as an 83rd-minute substitute during a 2–1 league defeat to Everton at Craven Cottage on 7 February 2026.

On 15 September 2026, Bobb scored his first Fulham goal, scoring the winner in a 3–2 EFL Cup third round victory over West Ham United at the London Stadium.

== International career ==
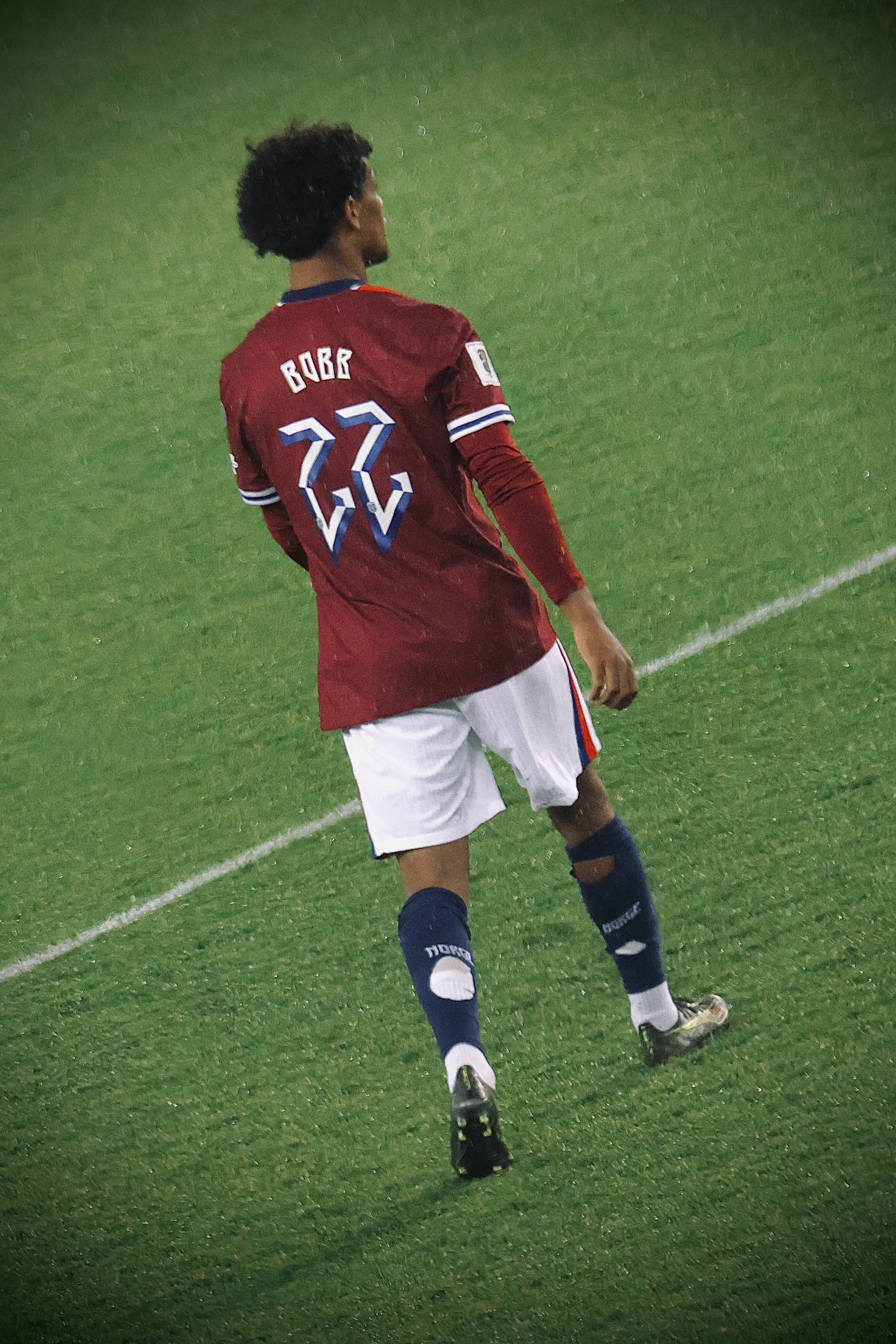
Bobb with Norway in 2025

Until 2023, he was a youth international for Norway, having played up to the Norway U21.

Bobb received his first call-up for the Norway men's team for the October 2023 international fixtures. On 12 October, he made his senior debut as a substitute at the 63rd minute, in the team's 4–0 UEFA Euro 2024 qualifying victory against Cyprus. On 16 November, Bobb scored his first goal for Norway in a home friendly match against the Faroe Islands.

On 21 May 2026, Bobb was included in the 26-man squad selected by Norway national team manager Ståle Solbakken for the 2026 FIFA World Cup.

== Personal life ==
Bobb speaks fluent Portuguese and enjoys taking holidays in Portugal.

== Career statistics ==
=== Club ===
As of match played 21 November 2026

Appearances and goals by club, season and competition
Club	Season	League			FA Cup		EFL Cup		Europe		Other		Total	
Club	Season	Division	Apps	Goals	Apps	Goals	Apps	Goals	Apps	Goals	Apps	Goals	Apps	Goals
Manchester City	2023–24	Premier League	14	1	5	0	1	0	4 (Note: Appearances in UEFA Champions League)	1	2 (Note: Appearances in FIFA Club World Cup)	0	26	2
Manchester City	2024–25	Premier League	3	0	0	0	0	0	0	0	3 (Note: One appearance in FA Community Shield, two appearances and one goal in FIFA Club World Cup)	1	6	1
Manchester City	2025–26	Premier League	9	0	0	0	3	0	3	0	—		15	0
Manchester City	Total		26	1	5	0	4	0	7	1	5	1	47	3
Fulham	2025–26	Premier League	14	0	2	0	—		—		—		16	0
Fulham	2026–27	Premier League	11	1	0	0	3	1	—		—		14	2
Fulham	Total		25	1	2	0	3	1	—		—		30	2
Career total			51	2	7	0	7	1	7	1	5	1	77	5

=== International ===
As of match played 17 November 2026

Appearances and goals by national team and year
National team	Year	Apps	Goals
Norway	2023	4	1
Norway	2024	4	1
Norway	2025	8	0
Norway	2026	16	2
Total		32	4

As of match played 4 October 2026
Norway score listed first, score column indicates score after each Bobb goal

List of international goals scored by Oscar Bobb
No.	Date	Venue	Cap	Opponent	Score	Result	Competition
1	16 November 2023	Ullevaal Stadion, Oslo, Norway	3	Faroe Islands	2–0	2–0	Friendly
2	22 March 2024	Ullevaal Stadion, Oslo, Norway	5	Czech Republic	1–0	1–2	Friendly
3	24 September 2026	Ullevaal Stadion, Oslo, Norway	27	Denmark	1–0	3–2	2026–27 UEFA Nations League A
4	1 October 2026	Cardiff City Stadium, Cardiff, Wales	29	Wales	1–0	1–2	2026–27 UEFA Nations League A

== Honours ==
Manchester City

- Premier League: 2023–24
- FA Community Shield: 2024
- UEFA Super Cup: 2023
- FIFA Club World Cup: 2023
- FA Cup runner-up: 2023–24

Individual

- Premier League Goal of the Month: January 2024
