= 2019 FA Community Shield =

- The match programme cover
Liverpool	Manchester City
1	1
- Manchester City won 5–4 on penalties
- Date: 4 August 2019
- Venue: Wembley Stadium, London
- Man of the Match: Kevin De Bruyne (Manchester City)
- Referee: Martin Atkinson (West Yorkshire)
- Attendance: 77,565

The 2019 FA Community Shield (also known as The FA Community Shield supported by McDonald's for sponsorship reasons) was the 97th FA Community Shield, an annual football match played between the winners of the previous season's Premier League and FA Cup. As Manchester City won both competitions in 2019, their opponents were the 2018–19 Premier League runners-up, Liverpool.

The match was played at Wembley Stadium on 4 August 2019. Manchester City retained the trophy they won in 2018, winning 5–4 on penalties.

== Background ==
In the 2018–19 season, Liverpool and Manchester City were in a heated title race, each going unbeaten in their first 15 league matches, and never more than three points apart in the table after the end of February. Despite being nine points behind Liverpool at Christmas, Manchester City won the league with 98 points, a point ahead of Liverpool. Manchester City also won the 2018–19 FA Cup and the 2018–19 EFL Cup, beating Watford 6–0 in the former, and defeating Chelsea 4–3 in a penalty shoot-out after a 0–0 draw in 2019 EFL Cup final.

During 2018–19 the two teams only met in the league, playing out a goalless draw at Anfield on 24 October, as City's Riyad Mahrez missed a crucial penalty kick in the 84th minute, before Manchester City won 2–1 at the City of Manchester Stadium on 3 January, with goals from Sergio Agüero and Leroy Sané for City either side of Roberto Firmino's effort for Liverpool. That game was Liverpool's only loss during the 2018–19 Premier League season.

This is the third super cup in which Liverpool's Jürgen Klopp and Manchester City's Pep Guardiola have faced each other. While they were each managing Der Klassiker rivals Borussia Dortmund and Bayern Munich respectively, they played against each other in the 2013 and 2014 DFL-Supercups, the German equivalent of the Community Shield. Klopp's side won on both occasions, with scores of 4–2 and 2–0 respectively. Both matches were played at Westfalenstadion, Dortmund's home stadium.

Manchester City wore a commemorative kit with no sponsor for the match, marking their 125th anniversary season.

== Match ==
=== Summary ===
Manchester City took the lead after 12 minutes when Kevin De Bruyne knocked the ball into the penalty area from the left to David Silva who flicked it to Raheem Sterling who scored from six yards out, hitting the ball with his left foot under Liverpool goalkeeper Alisson who almost managed to keep it out of the net. In the second half Virgil van Dijk had a shot from close range on the turn which came back off the underside of the bar and bounced out to safety. Liverpool equalized in the 77th minute when Joël Matip scored with a header from three yards out after a cross from the left by Virgil van Dijk. Mohamed Salah had a late chance to win the game but his initial shot was saved by Claudio Bravo with Salah following up with a header which was hooked off the line by Kyle Walker. The match went to a penalty shoot-out with Georginio Wijnaldum the only player to miss, Claudio Bravo saving to his right. Gabriel Jesus scored the winning penalty shooting to the left past Alisson to decide the match.

=== Details ===
4 August 2019
15:00 BST

Liverpool	1–1	Manchester City
Matip 77'	Report	Sterling 12'
Penalties
Shaqiri (penalty scored); Wijnaldum (penalty missed); Lallana (penalty scored); Oxlade-Chamberlain (penalty scored); Salah (penalty scored)	4–5	(penalty scored) Gündoğan; (penalty scored) B. Silva; (penalty scored) Foden; (penalty scored) Zinchenko; (penalty scored) Gabriel Jesus

Wembley Stadium, London
Attendance: 77,565
Referee: Martin Atkinson (West Yorkshire)

Liverpool	Manchester City

GK	1	(Brazil) Alisson
RB	66	(England) Trent Alexander-Arnold	(substituted off) 67'
CB	12	(England) Joe Gomez
CB	4	(Netherlands) Virgil van Dijk
LB	26	(Scotland) Andy Robertson
CM	14	(England) Jordan Henderson (c)	(substituted off) 79'
CM	3	(Brazil) Fabinho	(substituted off) 67'
CM	5	(Netherlands) Georginio Wijnaldum
RF	11	(Egypt) Mohamed Salah
CF	9	(Brazil) Roberto Firmino	(substituted off) 79'
LF	27	(Belgium) Divock Origi	(substituted off) 79'
Substitutes:
GK	22	(Belgium) Simon Mignolet
DF	6	(Croatia) Dejan Lovren
DF	32	(Cameroon) Joël Matip	(substituted on) 67'
MF	8	(Guinea) Naby Keïta	(substituted on) 67'
MF	15	(England) Alex Oxlade-Chamberlain	(substituted on) 79'
MF	20	(England) Adam Lallana	(substituted on) 79'
MF	23	(Switzerland) Xherdan Shaqiri	(substituted on) 79'
Manager:
(Germany) Jürgen Klopp

GK	1	(Chile) Claudio Bravo
RB	2	(England) Kyle Walker
CB	5	(England) John Stones
CB	30	(Argentina) Nicolás Otamendi
LB	11	(Ukraine) Oleksandr Zinchenko
CM	17	(Belgium) Kevin De Bruyne	(yellow card) 33'	(substituted off) 89'
CM	16	(Spain) Rodri
CM	21	(Spain) David Silva (c)		(substituted off) 61'
RF	20	(Portugal) Bernardo Silva
CF	7	(England) Raheem Sterling
LF	19	(Germany) Leroy Sané		(substituted off) 13'
Substitutes:
GK	31	(Brazil) Ederson
DF	12	(Spain) Angeliño
DF	50	(Spain) Eric García
MF	8	(Germany) İlkay Gündoğan		(substituted on) 61'
MF	47	(England) Phil Foden		(substituted on) 89'
FW	9	(Brazil) Gabriel Jesus		(substituted on) 13'
FW	10	(Argentina) Sergio Agüero
Manager:
(Spain) Pep Guardiola			(yellow card) 42'

Man of the Match:
Kevin De Bruyne (Manchester City)

Assistant referees:
Sian Massey-Ellis (Birmingham)
Dan Cook (Hampshire)
Fourth official:
Stuart Attwell (Birmingham)
Reserve assistant referee:
Neil Davies (London)
Video assistant referee:
Anthony Taylor (Cheshire)
Assistant video assistant referee:
Steve Child (London)

Match rules

- 90 minutes
- Penalty shoot-out if scores level
- Seven named substitutes, of which six may be used
