= Ralf Rangnick =

German football manager (born 1958)

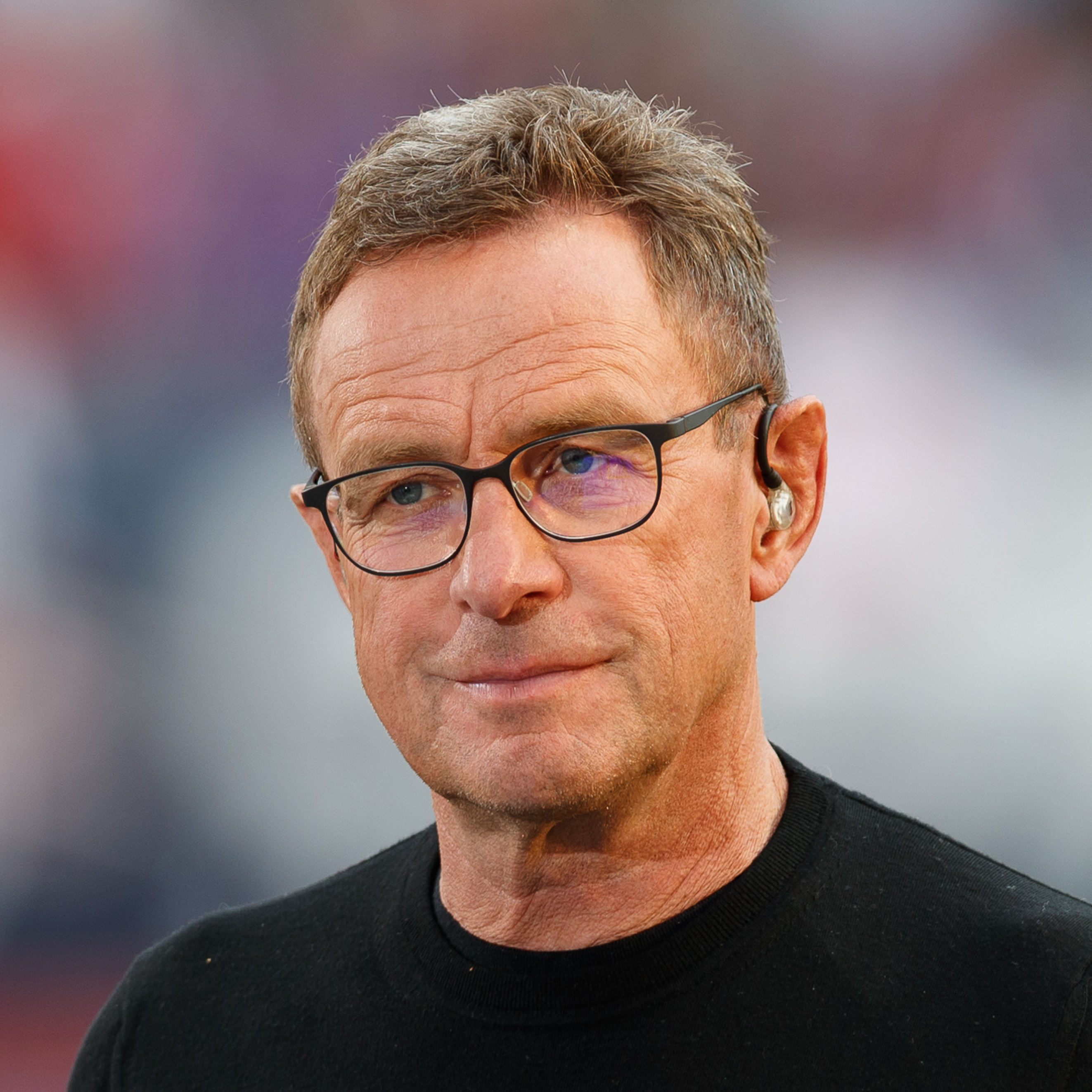
- Rangnick in 2022

Personal information
- Full name: Ralf Dietrich Rangnick
- Date of birth: 29 June 1958 (age 68)
- Place of birth: Backnang, West Germany
- Height: 1.81 m (5 ft 11 in)
- Position: Defensive midfielder

Team information
- Current team: Austria (head coach)

Senior career*
Years	Team	Apps	(Gls)
1976–1979	VfB Stuttgart II		
1979–1980	Southwick		
1980–1982	VfR Heilbronn	66	(6)
1982–1983	Ulm 1846	32	(0)
1983–1985	Viktoria Backnang		
1987–1988	TSV Lippoldsweiler		

Managerial career
- 1983–1985: Viktoria Backnang
- 1985–1987: VfB Stuttgart II
- 1987–1988: TSV Lippoldsweiler
- 1988–1990: SC Korb
- 1995–1997: Reutlingen 05
- 1997–1999: Ulm 1846
- 1999–2001: VfB Stuttgart
- 2001–2004: Hannover 96
- 2004–2005: Schalke 04
- 2006–2011: TSG Hoffenheim
- 2011: Schalke 04
- 2015–2016: RB Leipzig
- 2018–2019: RB Leipzig
- 2021–2022: Manchester United (interim)
- 2022–: Austria
- * Club domestic league appearances and goals

Ralf Dietrich Rangnick (German: [ʁalf ˈdiːtʁɪç ˈʁaŋnɪk]; born 29 June 1958) is a German football coach, executive, and former player who is the head coach of the Austria national team.

Rangnick began his coaching career in 1983, succeeding his career as a player, at age 25. In 1997, he was hired by former club Ulm 1846, with whom he won the Regionalliga Süd in his debut season. Rangnick was then appointed by Bundesliga club VfB Stuttgart, winning the UEFA Intertoto Cup in 2000, but was dismissed in 2001. He subsequently joined Hannover 96, winning the 2. Bundesliga, but was dismissed in 2004. After a brief period with Schalke 04, Rangnick joined TSG Hoffenheim in 2006, and achieved successive promotions to the Bundesliga. He departed the club in 2011 and returned to Schalke 04, where he won the 2011 DFB-Pokal and reached the semi-finals of the UEFA Champions League. He later served as head coach at RB Leipzig across two periods between 2015 and 2019.

Rangnick joined Red Bull as director of football in 2012, helping oversee their expansion into European football, emphasising the recruitment of unproven players and developing youth systems with a worldwide scouting base and an attacking on-pitch philosophy across their clubs. As a result, Red Bull clubs rose in market value from €120 million to €1.2 billion during his tenure. Their clubs have also seen sustained domestic success and generated sizable profits with player transfers, which led to Rangnick's promotion to head of sport and development in 2019. He resigned from Red Bull in 2020 and joined Russian club Lokomotiv Moscow as manager of sports and development in 2021. Later that year, Rangnick was appointed as interim manager of Manchester United until the end of the 2021–22 season, following which he took charge of the Austria national team.

Rangnick is credited with developing the Gegenpressing tactic, whereby the team, after losing possession, immediately attempts to win back possession, rather than falling back to regroup. His sides have been noted for their pressing and high attacking output, as well as for popularising zonal marking. He is credited for influencing Thomas Tuchel, Julian Nagelsmann and Jürgen Klopp, among others.

== Early life and playing career ==
Ralf Dietrich Rangnick was born and raised in Backnang. His parents, Dietrich and Erika Rangnick, met in 1945 in Lichtenstein, Saxony, in the Ore Mountains. His mother is from Breslau (now Wrocław, Poland) and his father is from Königsberg (now Kaliningrad, Russia).

Rangnick began his playing career at VfB Stuttgart, but was noted for his strategic talents and was added as player-coach. His playing career was short-lived and was primarily concentrated in Germany, but included a stint at English club Southwick while studying at the University of Sussex.

== Coaching career ==
Rangnick was one of the first coaches to publicise football tactics, notably during a ZDF SportsStudio TV broadcast in December 1998. As a result, Rangnick became known as the "professor"; a title initially used to jeer him, which then grew to be used to show respect.

=== Early career ===
Rangnick began his coaching career in the 1980s, first as player-coach at his hometown club Viktoria Backnang, then continuing on to play and coach at VfB Stuttgart II and TSV Lippoldsweiler.

In 1988, he became the head coach at SC Korb, remaining for two seasons before returning to VfB Stuttgart for four seasons to manage the Under 19 team. In 1991, he won the U-19 Bundesliga (German: A-Junioren Bundesliga), the highest honor in German U-19 football. Rangnick then returned to first team management in 1995 with two seasons as head coach at Reutlingen 05. He took the club to a fourth-place finish in his first season. They began the following campaign strong, with the club in the midst of the promotion push by Christmas. However, Rangnick would not see the season to its finish as he was sought after by his former club Ulm in January 1997. Reutlingen were in fifth position when Rangnick left the club.

His first match in charge of Ulm finished in a 2–0 loss to Greuther Fürth. Ulm were also positioned in the Regionalliga Süd, and although Rangnick could only manage a sixth-place position from the remainder of the 1996–97 season, they started the following season with a 3–1 win against Karlsruhe II. They won the Regionalliga Süd Championship in 1998. Rangnick adapted well to life in the 2. Bundesliga, and Ulm mounted a strong promotion push that led them to the Bundesliga for the first time in their history in 2000.

During the winter break of his second season, he signed a deal to move to top flight VfB Stuttgart for the next season. This was supposed to remain secret until the end of the season, but in February it was leaked out into public knowledge. This caused an outcry, especially as the team began to lose ground in the table, and by the end of March, Rangnick resigned from the post prematurely and, on 3 May 1999, took control of Stuttgart for the club's final five matches. His final match was a 2–0 loss to Unterhaching.

=== VfB Stuttgart ===
On 3 May 1999, Rangnick took control of VfB Stuttgart, for the final five games and saw the club finish 1998–99 season in eleventh place. He won two out of the club's five final matches. His first match was a 2–0 loss to Bayern Munich. Rangnick was now first team coach at the club he had served as a player and coached at amateur and under 19 level previously. His first full season in the 1999–2000 Bundesliga saw the club finish in a respectable eighth position. The following season was much tougher, however the team succeeded in making the round of 16 in the 2000–01 UEFA Cup after winning the UEFA Intertoto Cup, and the semi-finals of the DFB-Pokal. Nonetheless, Stuttgart's Bundesliga form left them hovering in the relegation zone by the halfway point. After their European exit in February 2001, Stuttgart dismissed Rangnick. His final match was 2–1 loss to Celta Vigo in the UEFA Cup on 22 February 2001. Stuttgart were in 17th place at the time of his sacking. Rangnick finished with a record of 36 wins, 16 draws and 34 losses.

=== Hannover 96 ===
The next season brought a new post, as Rangnick took over 2. Bundesliga side Hannover 96 on 23 May 2001. His first match was a 1–1 draw against Union Berlin on 30 July 2001. His first season was a complete success as they romped home as champions and were promoted to the Bundesliga after a 13-year absence. Their first season back at the top level saw them consolidate with an 11th-place finish, but, as their form nosedived in the second half of the 2003–04 season, Rangnick was dismissed following a 0–1 defeat at Borussia Mönchengladbach in March 2004. Hannover were in 15th place at the time of his sacking. Rangnick finished with a record of 44 wins, 22 draws and 32 losses.

=== Schalke 04 ===
After missing out on the role as assistant manager for the Germany national team to Joachim Löw, Rangnick was hired by Schalke 04 on 28 September 2004, after Jupp Heynckes left just weeks into the 2004–05 season. Rangnick again tasted European action as the club had earned a UEFA Cup spot via the UEFA Intertoto Cup. His first match was in the UEFA Cup. Schalke won 4–0 against Metalurgs Liepājas. He led them through the group phase, but they exited in the knockout rounds to Shakhtar Donetsk. However, the DFB-Pokal was to prove more successful, as Rangnick took the club to the final, where they fell 2–1 to Bayern Munich. Bayern would also pip Rangnick's side in the league, as Schalke ended as runners-up.

The next season started well, with Rangnick defeating former club VfB Stuttgart 1–0 and securing the 2005 DFL-Ligapokal. Their second-place league finish of the previous year had also qualified them for the 2005–06 UEFA Champions League, Rangnick's first entry into the prestigious competition. However, the team would fail to progress beyond the group stage, and sat ten points off the pace in the Bundesliga, as well as having crashed 0–6 in the DFB-Pokal to Eintracht Frankfurt. Shortly before the winter break, these results prompted the club to dismiss Rangnick on 12 December 2005. He left with a record of 36 wins, 15 draws and 14 losses.

=== TSG Hoffenheim ===
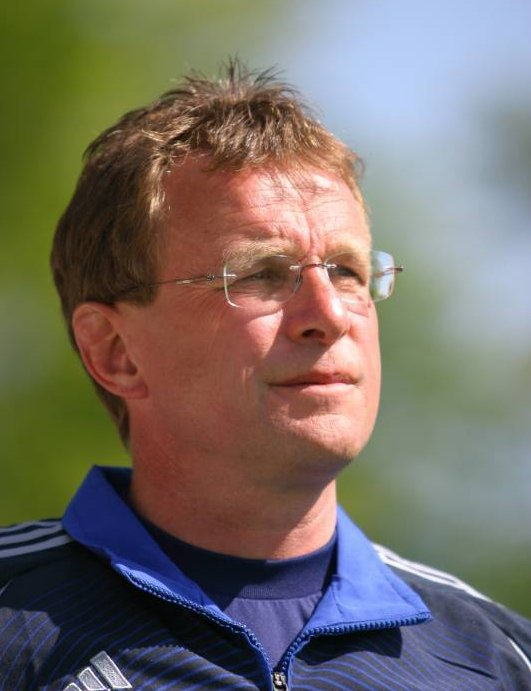
Rangnick with TSG Hoffenheim in 2007

Rangnick's next appointment as head coach was at TSG Hoffenheim of the Regionalliga Süd for the 2006–07 season. His first match was a 2–2 draw against 1860 Munich II on 5 August 2006. The team instantly won promotion and played the 2007–08 season in the 2. Bundesliga for their first time in their history. The stay in the 2. Bundesliga was short, as a second-place finish for Hoffenheim in 2007–08 earned the club, and Rangnick, promotion to the Bundesliga for the 2008–09 season. They also reached the quarter-finals of the DFB-Pokal. During the 2008–09 season, Hoffenheim reached the second round of the DFB-Pokal. In the first half of the season, Hoffenheim won 35 out of 51 available points, however in the second half, the club won only 20 out of 51 points to drop down to seventh place.

During the 2009–10 season, Hoffenheim reached the quarter-finals of the DFB-Pokal. Hoffenheim finished in eleventh place in the Bundesliga. On 2 January 2011, Rangnick resigned as head coach of Hoffenheim, citing the sale of midfielder Luiz Gustavo to Bayern Munich, of which he had not been informed, as his reason for resigning from the club. Rangnick's final match was a 2–0 win against Borussia Mönchengladbach on 21 December 2010 in the DFB-Pokal. Hoffenheim were in eighth place when Rangnick left the club. Rangnick finished with a record of 79 wins, 43 draws and 44 losses.

=== Return to Schalke 04 ===
In March 2011, Rangnick was named as the replacement for Felix Magath as coach of Schalke 04. His first match was a 2–0 forfeit win against St. Pauli on 1 April 2011. The game was stopped in the 89th minute, after a beer mug was thrown at the assistant, overshadowing Rangnick's successful debut at Millerntor. At the time of the cancellation, Schalke was leading 2–0. Just weeks after being named the new Schalke coach, Rangnick led his old club to their first UEFA Champions League semi-finals by defeating holders Inter Milan 7–3 on aggregate. However, Schalke were eliminated by Manchester United in the semi-finals.

Schalke began the 2011–12 season by defeating Borussia Dortmund in a shootout in the 2011 DFL-Supercup. On 22 September 2011, Rangnick stepped down as Schalke's coach due to chronic fatigue syndrome, stating he did not have "the necessary energy to be successful and to develop the team and the club". He finished with a record of ten wins, three draws and ten losses.

=== RB Leipzig ===
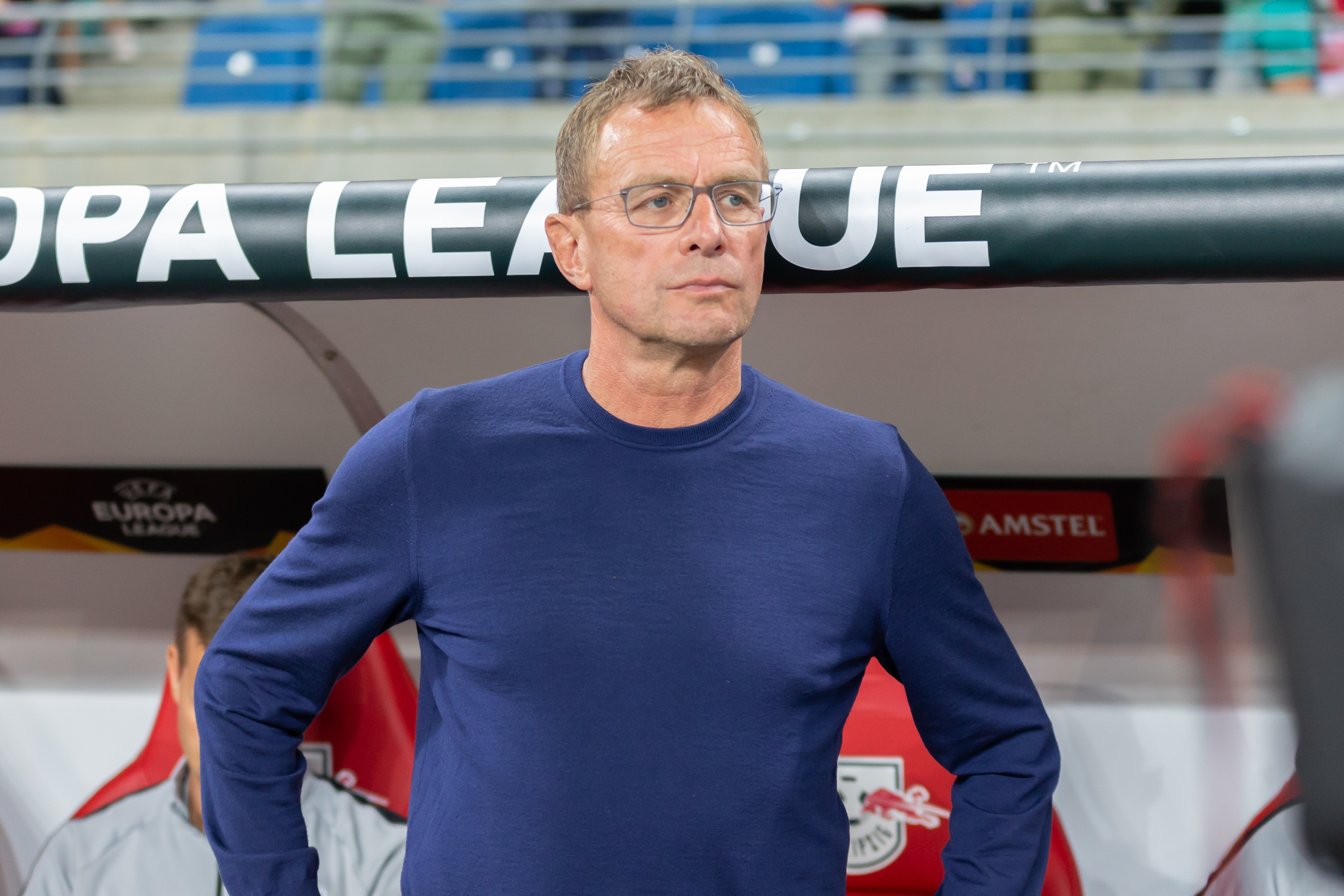
Rangnick managing RB Leipzig in 2018

In February 2015, Rangnick announced he would be taking over as coach at RB Leipzig for the 2015–16 season. Achim Beierlorzer took over until the end of the season following the immediate resignation of Alexander Zorniger. In addition, Rangnick resigned as director of football of Red Bull Salzburg. His first match was a 1–0 win against Frankfurt on 25 July, and Rangnick secured promotion to the Bundesliga with the win against Karlsruher SC on 8 May 2016. On 16 May, Leipzig announced Ralph Hasenhüttl would take over from Rangnick. Rangnick finished with a record of 21 wins, seven draws and eight losses.

On 9 July 2018, Rangnick took over, once again, as coach of RB Leipzig. He won his first match on his return 4–0 against Swedish club Häcken in the second qualifying round of the Europa League. Leipzig eventually won the tie 5–1 on aggregate. They then eliminated Universitatea Craiova in the third qualifying round. The first domestic match (and victory) came against Viktoria Köln in the German Cup, as Leipzig won the match 3–1. Leipzig's first Bundesliga match took place on 26 August 2018. Leipzig lost to Borussia Dortmund 4–1. Leipzig qualified for the Europa League group stage after knocking out Zorya Luhansk with a 3–2 aggregate score in the play-off round. In the group stage, they were drawn against Red Bull Salzburg, Celtic and Rosenborg, finishing in third in the group stage.

Notwithstanding, the club ended the season third in Bundesliga, qualified to the UEFA Champions League for the 2019–20 season, and reached the DFB-Pokal final, losing to Bayern Munich. Rangnick finished his second term as coach with a record of 29 wins, 13 draws and ten losses.

=== Manchester United ===
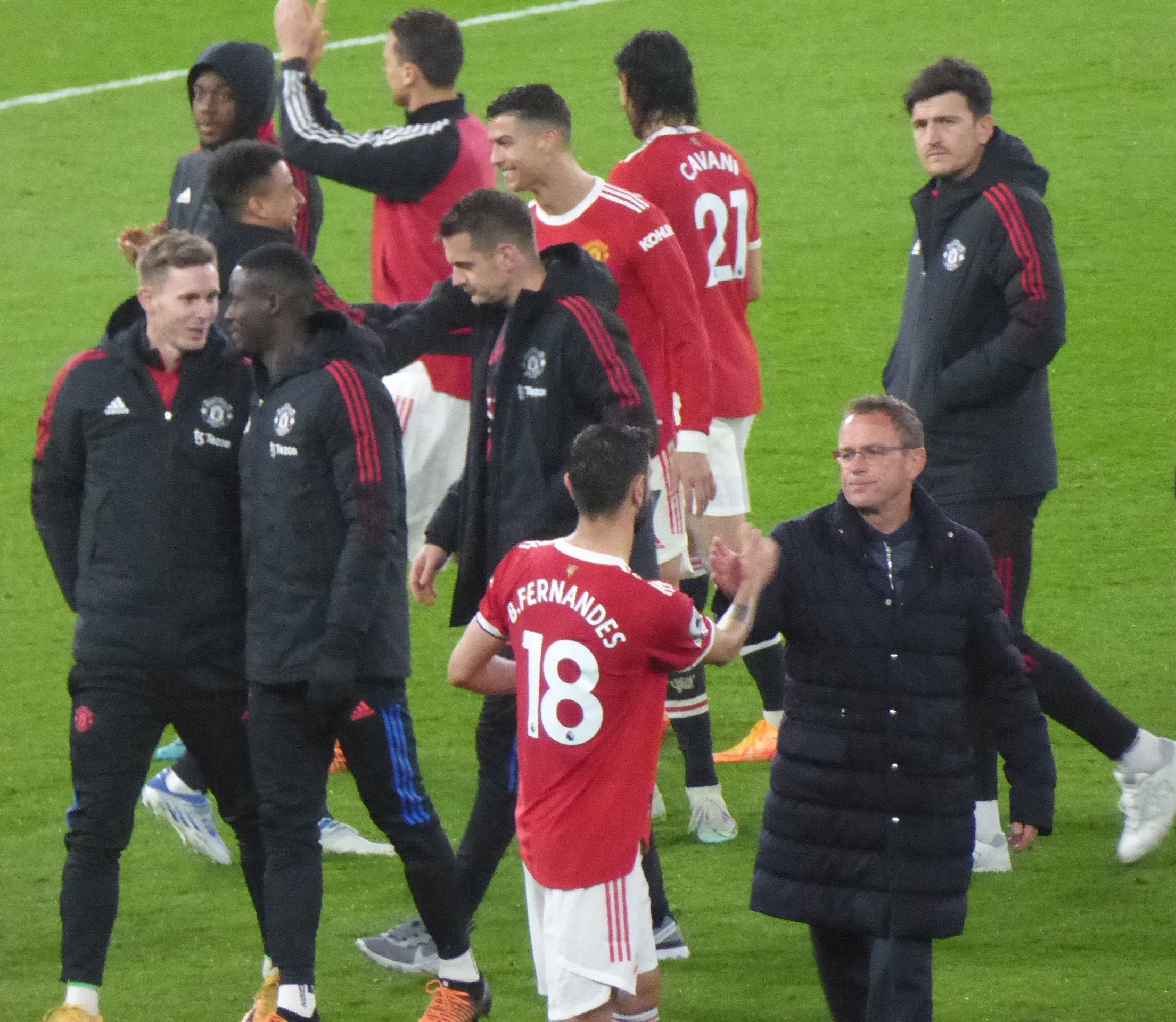
Rangnick managing Manchester United in May 2022

Following the dismissal of Ole Gunnar Solskjær after a poor run of results in the first few months of the 2021–22 season, Rangnick was shortlisted as a potential short term manager by Manchester United. Although the board had initially decided to give caretaker manager Michael Carrick a longer run of games while scouting replacements, Rangnick quickly emerged as the outstanding candidate during interviews, and was appointed as interim manager until the end of the season on 29 November 2021. Following this period, it was stated he would continue in a consultancy role for a further two years. He officially took charge a few days later on 2 December, following the approval of his work permit. His first match saw the club victorious against Crystal Palace 1–0 with a goal from Fred.

Rangnick quite often talked about intensity, physicality, energy as all the technical qualities being necessary to be successful. Results under Rangnick were good until a Champions League game against Atlético Madrid in February, but the first signs were visible that the temporary nature of the spell and having no long-term plan caused uncertainty. After overseeing United lose 4–0 to rivals Liverpool in April 2022, Rangnick suggested that Liverpool were "six years ahead" of United, and outlined the club's need to invest in the upcoming transfer window. The German expressed his frustration with his spell at Manchester United as it came to a close at the end of the season, stating: "In the end, I'm not happy with the results". United finished the season in sixth place with 58 points, which was until the 2024–25 season the worst points-total record in their Premier League history. The club and Rangnick decided that he would not continue with his planned consultancy role with the club, due to the demands of his new role at the Austria national team.

=== Austria national team ===
On 29 April 2022, Rangnick was appointed manager of the Austria national team on a two-year deal, starting in June. Austria had just failed to qualify for the 2022 FIFA World Cup, finishing fourth behind Denmark, Scotland, and Israel, and then losing the play off against Wales. One of his goals is to bring back the fans by entertaining football, and showing team spirit. On 3 June, Rangnick's first game in charge finished in a 3–0 win over Croatia in the UEFA Nations League A. However, that remained Austria's only victory of the season and, following a 3–1 defeat to Croatia on 25 September, they got relegated to League B. On 16 October 2023, the team qualified for UEFA Euro 2024. As a result, his contract with Austria national team was automatically extended through to the 2026 FIFA World Cup. In April 2024, Rangnick was approached by Bayern Munich, but despite holding talks with the club he turned down their interest and reaffirmed his commitment to Austria.

Rangnick's first game at Euro 2024 ended in a 1–0 loss to France. However, Austria won their next two group games with a 3–1 win against Poland and a 3–2 win against the Netherlands to finish top of the group. Austria were subsequently eliminated in the round of 16, losing 2–1 to Turkey. Afterwards, he led Austria to the top of their 2026 World Cup qualifying group, securing the country's first World Cup qualification since 1998. Ahead of the tournament, he extended his contract through to 2028.

== Executive career ==
=== Red Bull ===
In June 2012, Rangnick became the director of football for both Red Bull Salzburg and RB Leipzig. Under Rangnick's leadership, by 2018, RB Leipzig saw promotion from regional league (tier IV) to the Bundesliga (tier I), and reached the UEFA Champions League; their highest domestic finish was runners-up in the 2016–17 season, while their highest European finish was reaching the semi-finals in the 2019–20 season. Despite consistent on-field success, RB Leipzig only won one trophy, the Saxony Cup, with Rangnick. Meanwhile, Red Bull Salzburg won Austrian Bundesliga and Austrian Cup multiple times, and reached the Champions League and UEFA Europa League.

In 2019, Rangnick was promoted to head of sport and development for Red Bull, thus overseeing global football initiatives, including the New York Red Bulls and their takeover of Red Bull Bragantino. Under Rangnick's tenure, the New York Red Bulls won the Supporters Shield in 2013, 2015 and 2018, while Red Bull Bragantino gained promotion to Série A in 2020. He resigned from Red Bull in 2020, with a reported move to Milan failing during negotiations. While at Red Bull, their clubs rose in market value from €120 million to €1.2 billion during his tenure, with its largest club, RB Leipzig, peaking in value to €270 million in 2019. Red Bull also generated sizable profits with player transfers.

=== Lokomotiv Moscow ===
On 6 July 2021, he signed a three-year contract as manager of sports and development for Russian Premier League club Lokomotiv Moscow. He left the post on 29 November 2021 to become interim manager of Manchester United.

== Style of management ==
"He was one of the very first to implement a back four in Germany and introduce the style of not man-marking and still being aggressive, and was one of the pioneers to introduce a 4-4-2 and high pressing. Still he is one of the leaders of this development in German football so tactically for sure he is an elite coach."

— Thomas Tuchel praised Rangnick’s influence on German football, November 2021

Rangnick is regarded as the "godfather" of modern German football. He is credited with developing Gegenpressing, whereby the team, after losing possession, immediately attempts to win back possession, rather than falling back to regroup together with evolving player's spatial coverage by increasing memory space and processing pace. He developed this after playing a friendly against Dynamo Kyiv in 1984, being inspired by the pressing philosophy of Valeriy Lobanovskyi. His sides have been noted for their pressing and high attacking output, as well as for popularising zonal marking.

Rangnick has cited his main coaching influences as Ernst Happel, Valeriy Lobanovskyi, Arrigo Sacchi and Zdeněk Zeman, and is credited for influencing Thomas Tuchel, Jürgen Klopp, Julian Nagelsmann, Ralph Hasenhüttl, Marco Rose, Roger Schmidt, Adi Hütter, Oliver Glasner and Matthias Jaissle.

Rangnick has said that a parental seminar about "raising kids with love and consequence" influenced his relationship with the people he works with.

== Philanthropy ==
In 2018, Rangnick established the Ralf Rangnick Foundation which aims to support children in their development and enable their personalities to flourish.

== Managerial statistics ==
As of match played 17 November 2026

Managerial record by team and tenure
Team	Nat.	From	To	Record					Ref.
Team	Nat.	From	To	G	W	D	L	Win %	Ref.
VfB Stuttgart II	(Germany)	1 July 1985	30 June 1987	70	28	16	26	40.00	
Reutlingen 05	(Germany)	1 July 1995	31 December 1996	51	26	12	13	50.98	
Ulm 1846	(Germany)	1 January 1997	16 March 1999	75	36	18	21	48.00	
VfB Stuttgart	(Germany)	3 May 1999	24 February 2001	86	36	16	34	41.86	
Hannover 96	(Germany)	23 May 2001	8 March 2004	98	44	22	32	44.90	
Schalke 04	(Germany)	28 September 2004	12 December 2005	65	36	15	14	55.38	
TSG Hoffenheim	(Germany)	22 June 2006	2 January 2011	166	79	43	44	47.59	
Schalke 04	(Germany)	21 March 2011	22 September 2011	23	10	3	10	43.48	
RB Leipzig	(Germany)	29 May 2015	16 May 2016	36	21	7	8	58.33	
RB Leipzig	(Germany)	9 July 2018	30 June 2019	52	29	13	10	55.77	
Manchester United (interim)	(England)	2 December 2021	22 May 2022	29	11	10	8	37.93	
Austria	(Austria)	24 May 2022	Present	56	32	12	12	57.14	
Career Total				807	388	187	232	48.08	

== Honours ==
=== Manager ===
Ulm 1846

- Regionalliga Süd: 1997–98

VfB Stuttgart

- UEFA Intertoto Cup: 2000
- Under 19 Bundesliga: 1990–91

Hannover 96

- 2. Bundesliga: 2001–02

Schalke 04

- DFB-Pokal: 2010–11; runner-up: 2004–05
- DFL-Supercup: 2011
- DFL-Ligapokal: 2005
