= Lars Dendoncker =

Belgian footballer

Personal information
- Date of birth: 3 April 2001 (age 25)
- Place of birth: Passendale, Belgium
- Position: Defender

Youth career
- Club Brugge
- 2020–2021: Brighton & Hove Albion

Senior career*
Years	Team	Apps	(Gls)
2021–2022	Brighton & Hove Albion	0	(0)
2021–2022	→ St Johnstone (loan)	6	(0)
- * Club domestic league appearances and goals as of 22:30, 2 January 2022 (UTC)

Lars Dendoncker (born 3 April 2001) is a Belgian former professional footballer who played as a defender.

== Club career ==
After beginning his career in the youth system of Club Brugge, Dendoncker joined the academy of Premier League club Brighton & Hove Albion on a two-year contract in 2020.

In August 2021, Dendoncker signed for Scottish Premiership club St Johnstone on a season-long loan. He made his debut for the club the following month, starting in a 3–1 win over Dundee. Dendoncker returned to his parent club in January 2022. He was released by Brighton in May 2022. Having not found a new club, he retired at age 22 in July 2023, due to a heart condition.

== Personal life ==
Dendoncker is the youngest of three brothers. The middle child Leander played in the Premier League for Wolverhampton Wanderers and Aston Villa while being a senior international for Belgium, while eldest Andres played local football before becoming the agent of the other two.

== Career statistics ==
As of 26 December 2021

Appearances and goals by club, season and competition
Club	Season	League			National cup		League cup		Other		Total	
Club	Season	Division	Apps	Goals	Apps	Goals	Apps	Goals	Apps	Goals	Apps	Goals
Brighton & Hove Albion	2021–22	Premier League	0	0	0	0	0	0	—		0	0
St Johnstone (loan)	2021–22	Scottish Premiership	6	0	0	0	1	0	—		7	0
Career total			6	0	0	0	1	0	0	0	7	0
