= Reece Devine =

English footballer (born 2001)

Personal information
- Full name: Reece Devine
- Date of birth: 18 December 2001 (age 24)
- Place of birth: Stourbridge, England
- Height: 1.84 m (6 ft 0 in)
- Position: Left-back

Team information
- Current team: Kidderminster Harriers
- Number: 5

Youth career
- Wolverhampton Wanderers
- Manchester City
- 2018–2021: Manchester United

Senior career*
Years	Team	Apps	(Gls)
2021–2022	Manchester United	0	(0)
2021–2022	→ St Johnstone (loan)	6	(0)
2022	→ Walsall (loan)	8	(0)
2022–2024	Swindon Town	1	(0)
2024–	Kidderminster Harriers	50	(2)
- * Club domestic league appearances and goals as of 22:26, 10 December 2025 (UTC)

Reece Devine (born 18 December 2001) is an English professional footballer who plays as a left-back for National League club Kidderminster Harriers.

== Career ==
=== Manchester United ===
After playing youth football with Wolverhampton Wanderers, Manchester City and Manchester United, Devine moved on loan to Scottish club St Johnstone in July 2021. He returned to his parent club in January 2022.

On 28 January 2022, Devine joined League Two side Walsall on a loan deal until the end of the 2021–22 season.

=== Swindon Town ===
After his release from Manchester United, it was announced in June 2022 that he would sign for Swindon Town on 1 July 2022. In March 2023, he was ruled out for 4 months due following a hamstring injury. In March 2023, he was ruled out for approximately four months with a hamstring injury.

He was released by the club at the end of the 2023–24 season.

=== Kidderminster Harriers ===
In August 2024, Devine signed with Kidderminster Harriers after a summer trial. In December 2024, he signed a contract extension with the club until 2026.

== Career statistics ==
As of 9 March 2023

Appearances and goals by club, season and competition
Club	Season	League			National cup		League cup		Other		Total	
Club	Season	Division	Apps	Goals	Apps	Goals	Apps	Goals	Apps	Goals	Apps	Goals
Manchester United U21	2019–20	—	—		—		—		3 (Note: Appearance(s) in the EFL Trophy)	0	3	0
Manchester United U21	2020–21	—	—		—		—		2	0	2	0
Manchester United U21	Total		—		—		—		5	0	5	0
Manchester United	2021–22	Premier League	0	0	0	0	0	0	0	0	0	0
St Johnstone (loan)	2021–22	Scottish Premiership	6	0	0	0	1	0	3 (Note: Two appearances in the UEFA Europa League, one in the UEFA Europa Conference League)	0	10	0
Walsall (loan)	2021–22	League Two	8	0	0	0	0	0	0	0	8	0
Swindon Town	2022–23	League Two	1	0	0	0	0	0	1	0	2	0
Swindon Town	2023–24	League Two	0	0	0	0	0	0	0	0	0	0
Swindon Town	Total		1	0	0	0	0	0	1	0	2	0
Kidderminster Harriers	2024–25	National League North	0	0	0	0	0	0	0	0	0	0
Career total			15	0	0	0	1	0	9	0	25	0

== Honours ==
Kidderminster Harriers

- National League North play-offs: 2026
