= 2021–22 Manchester United F.C. season =

English football club season

Manchester United
2021–22 season
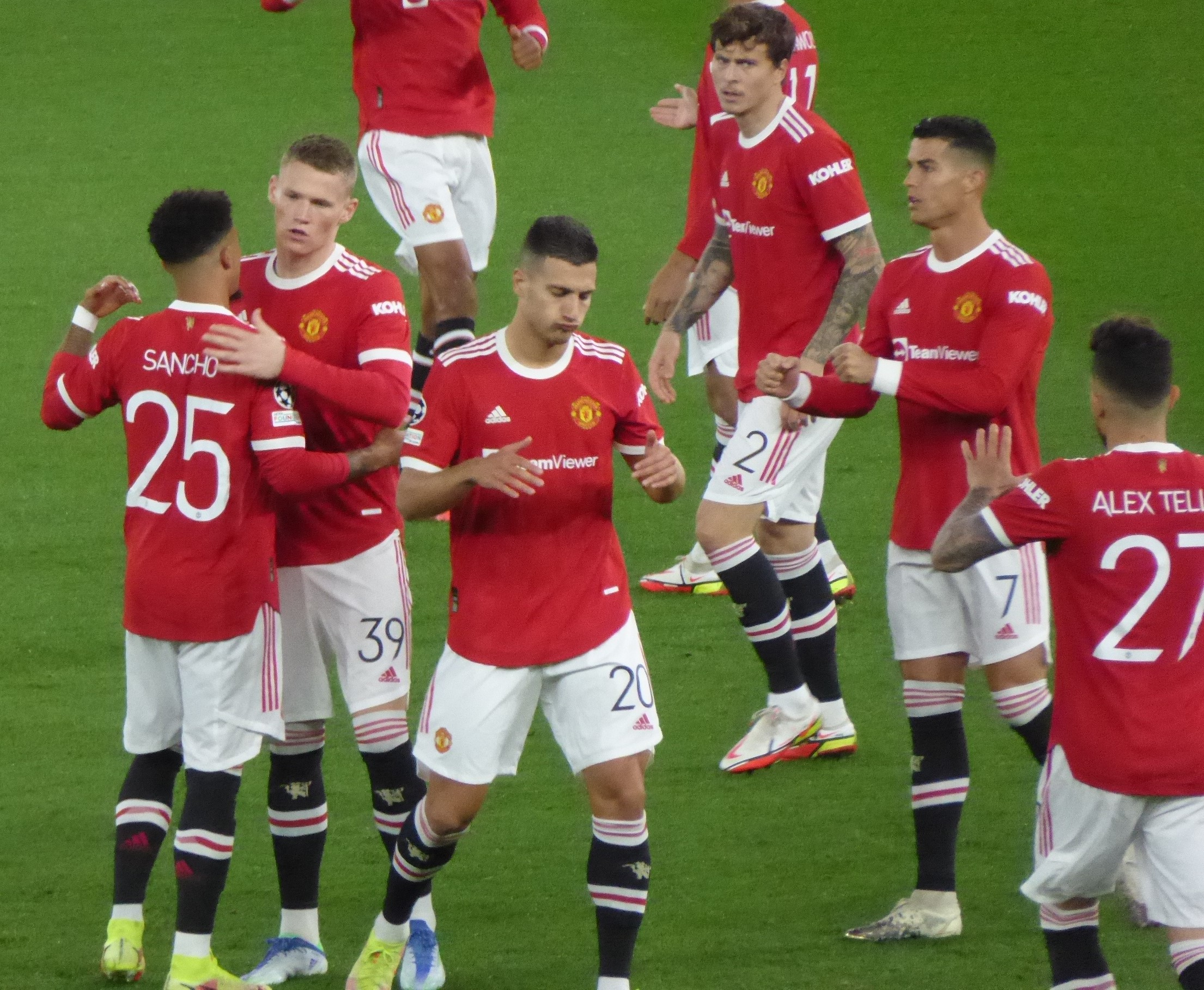
- Manchester United players during a UEFA Champions League match against Villarreal CF in September 2021
- Co-chairmen: Joel and Avram Glazer
- Manager: Ole Gunnar Solskjær (until 21 November); Michael Carrick (caretaker; 21 November – 2 December); Ralf Rangnick (interim; from 3 December)
- Stadium: Old Trafford
- Premier League: 6th
- FA Cup: Fourth round
- EFL Cup: Third round
- UEFA Champions League: Round of 16
- Top goalscorer: League: Cristiano Ronaldo (18); All: Cristiano Ronaldo (24)
- Highest home attendance: 73,564 (v. Chelsea, 28 April 2022)
- Lowest home attendance: 71,871 (v. Middlesbrough, 4 February 2022)
- Average home league attendance: 73,150
Home colours	Away colours	Third colours

The 2021–22 season was Manchester United's 30th season in the Premier League and their 47th consecutive season in the top flight of English football.

On 27 August 2021, Cristiano Ronaldo returned to the club from Juventus, 12 years after leaving for Real Madrid in 2009 for a world-record transfer fee.

Manager Ole Gunnar Solskjær began his third full season in charge following a second-place finish the previous season and a loss in the Europa League final. Despite a strong start, he was sacked on 21 November after winning just one league game in seven. First-team coach Michael Carrick took charge as caretaker for three games, after which Ralf Rangnick was appointed interim manager on 3 December and oversaw the team until the end of the season. Erik ten Hag was appointed Solskjær's permanent successor on 21 April and took over following the final game of the campaign.

This was United's fifth consecutive trophyless season, their longest drought since a six-season run between 1968–69 and 1973–74. They recorded their worst points tally in the Premier League era, finishing with just 58 points. Despite this, they placed sixth and qualified for the UEFA Europa League. United were knocked out of the EFL Cup in the third round by West Ham United, and out of the FA Cup in the fourth round by Middlesbrough on penalties. United were eliminated from the UEFA Champions League in the Round of 16 by Atlético Madrid.

== Pre-season and friendlies ==
Due to the COVID-19 pandemic, Manchester United did not go on an overseas tour in the 2021–22 pre-season. Instead, they played matches in England, beginning with an away match against Championship side Derby County – managed by United's record goalscorer, Wayne Rooney – on 18 July 2021. Tahith Chong, who was playing despite having agreed to join Birmingham City on loan for the season, scored the first goal in the 18th minute. He was substituted at half-time by Facundo Pellistri, who added a second on the hour mark. Colin Kazim-Richards pulled a goal back for Derby, but United held on to win 2–1. United's next game was against Queens Park Rangers on 24 July. Jesse Lingard opened the scoring in the third minute, but Charlie Austin equalised four minutes later. QPR then scored three goals in the space of eight minutes in the second half to give them a 4–1 lead with half an hour to play. Anthony Elanga pulled a goal back for Manchester United in the 73rd minute, but it was not enough to prevent defeat.

On 28 July, United returned to Old Trafford to play Premier League debutants Brentford. Elanga scored his second goal in two games in the 12th minute, only for Shandon Baptiste to equalise eight minutes later. Andreas Pereira then put United in front again with a volley from 25 yards out that went in off the underside of the crossbar; however, Bryan Mbeumo equalised for Brentford with 12 minutes left to play, and the visitors left with a draw. United were scheduled to play an away game against another Championship club, Preston North End, on 31 July, but the match was cancelled due to a number of suspected positive COVID-19 tests within the Manchester United team. The final pre-season game was at home to fellow Premier League side Everton on 7 August; United were 3–0 up by half-time via goals from Mason Greenwood, Harry Maguire and Bruno Fernandes, before Diogo Dalot scored a fourth in the second half.

Date	Opponents	H / A	Result F–A	Scorers	Attendance
18 July 2021	Derby County	A	2–1	Chong 18', Pellistri 60'	
24 July 2021	Queens Park Rangers	A	2–4	Lingard 3', Elanga 73'	
28 July 2021	Brentford	H	2–2	Elanga 12', Pereira 50'	30,000
31 July 2021	Preston North End	A	Cancelled		
7 August 2021	Everton	H	4–0	Greenwood 8', Maguire 15', Fernandes 29', Dalot 90+2'	55,000

== Premier League ==
=== Matches ===
The 2021–22 Premier League fixtures were released on 16 June 2021.

The league season started with a home match against Roses rival Leeds United on 14 August 2021. Bruno Fernandes scored a hat-trick, and Mason Greenwood and Fred scored the other two goals in a 5–1 win, as Paul Pogba equalled a Premier League record with four assists. Luke Ayling scored the only goal for the visitors. The following week, United travelled to face Southampton, and went behind on the half-hour mark, when Fred deflected Ché Adams' shot past David de Gea for an own goal. Greenwood equalised 10 minutes into the second half, but United were unable to find a winner and the game finished 1–1, extending United's unbeaten away run to 27 league matches, equalling the record set by Arsenal in 2004. That record was broken the following week, when on 29 August 2021, United travelled to face Wolverhampton Wanderers in the final match before the first international break of the season. Raphaël Varane made his debut following his move from Real Madrid, and provided the assist as Greenwood scored the only goal of the game to secure a 1–0 win.

United's first game after the international break was at home to Newcastle United on 11 September and marked Cristiano Ronaldo's second debut for the club after re-signing from Juventus. It took him until injury time at the end of the first half to open the scoring, turning home the rebound after Newcastle goalkeeper Freddie Woodman spilled a long-range shot from Greenwood. Javier Manquillo equalised for Newcastle in the 56th minute, but Ronaldo restored United's lead six minutes later with a shot through Woodman's legs following a through-ball from Luke Shaw. Fernandes then scored a third with a long-range strike 10 minutes from full time, before Jesse Lingard scored his first goal for the club since August 2020, as United won 4–1 to return to the top of the table. In the next match away to West Ham United on 19 September, United went behind on the half-hour when a shot from Saïd Benrahma was deflected past De Gea off Varane; however, less than five minutes later, Ronaldo scored the equaliser, following up after his original shot was saved by Łukasz Fabiański. A minute from the end of normal time, Lingard put United in front with a curling shot into the top corner from just inside the penalty area, but deep into injury time, West Ham were awarded a penalty after Shaw was deemed to have handled the ball in his own area. Mark Noble was brought on specifically to take the kick, but De Gea dived the right way to make the save; it was his first penalty save in the league since October 2014. United then played host to Aston Villa on 25 September, and lost defenders Harry Maguire and Shaw to injury either side of half-time. The match remained goalless until the 88th minute, when Kortney Hause headed in a corner. The Villa defender then gave away a penalty in injury time when he handled the ball after an Edinson Cavani flick-on; however, Fernandes' shot went over the bar, giving Villa their first win at Old Trafford in any competition since December 2009.

United took the lead just before half-time in their first fixture in October, at home to Everton, when Anthony Martial scored his first club goal since the 9–0 win over Southampton in February; however, Andros Townsend equalised for the visitors 20 minutes into the second half. Yerry Mina thought he had scored the winning goal in the 86th minute, but it was ruled out for offside by the video assistant referee (VAR). Following the international break, United travelled to the King Power Stadium two weeks later to face Leicester City. Greenwood opened the scoring, but Youri Tielemans pulled Leicester level just after the half-hour, before Çağlar Söyüncü put them in front with 12 minutes to go in the match. Marcus Rashford levelled the scores again in his first appearance since the UEFA Euro 2020 final, but Jamie Vardy restored Leicester's lead a minute later and Patson Daka added a fourth in injury time to end United's record-breaking away Premier League unbeaten streak at 29. The following week, United hosted arch-rivals Liverpool; Naby Keïta opened the scoring in the fifth minute, before Diogo Jota doubled the lead eight minutes later. Mohamed Salah scored two more before half-time to put United four goals down at the break for only the second time in a Premier League game, before completing his hat-trick five minutes into the second half. Pogba was then sent off for a two-footed tackle on Keïta as United suffered their worst ever home defeat to Liverpool. With United on the verge of losing three league games in a row for the first time since December 2015, they travelled to play Tottenham Hotspur on 30 October. Playing with five at the back following the return of Varane from injury and with Cavani starting up front alongside Ronaldo, United won the match 3–0. Ronaldo opened the scoring six minutes before half-time before providing an assist for Cavani's first goal of the season almost 20 minutes into the second half, and Rashford completed the scoring four minutes from the end.

November began with Manchester United playing host to their local rivals Manchester City at Old Trafford. Eric Bailly started in place of Varane, who had been injured in the Champions League match against Atalanta four days earlier, and it was the Ivorian defender who opened the scoring, albeit for the away side, as he put João Cancelo's cross into his own net. Bernardo Silva doubled City's lead just before half-time, when Bailly was substituted by Jadon Sancho. City remained the more likely of the two sides to score in the second half, but De Gea was able to keep them out for the remainder of the game, and United went into the international break nine points behind league leaders Chelsea as City won a league match against United for the first time since 24 April 2019. On 20 November 2021, United suffered a 4–1 defeat to newly promoted Watford, leaving the Red Devils seventh in the table. United academy graduate Joshua King opened the scoring before De Gea saved a penalty from Ismaïla Sarr (as well as the original, which had to be retaken for encroachment); however, Sarr did eventually score just before half-time. Donny van de Beek scored his first goal of the season five minutes into the second half, but Maguire was sent off for a second yellow card midway through the period. As United searched for an equaliser, João Pedro and Emmanuel Dennis scored in added time to confirm Watford's victory. It was announced the following day that Solskjær had left his role by mutual consent and that Michael Carrick had replaced him as caretaker manager. In Carrick's first Premier League match in charge, which made him the first English manager to lead United in a league match since Ron Atkinson in November 1986, United visited Chelsea at Stamford Bridge. United opened the scoring after Jorginho miscontrolled a long clearance from Fernandes, allowing Sancho to take advantage of a two-on-one with Édouard Mendy and score his first league goal for United; however, Jorginho made up for his mistake from the penalty spot, after Aaron Wan-Bissaka had fouled Thiago Silva in the penalty area, and the match finished 1–1, making Chelsea still seeking their first league win against United since November 2017.

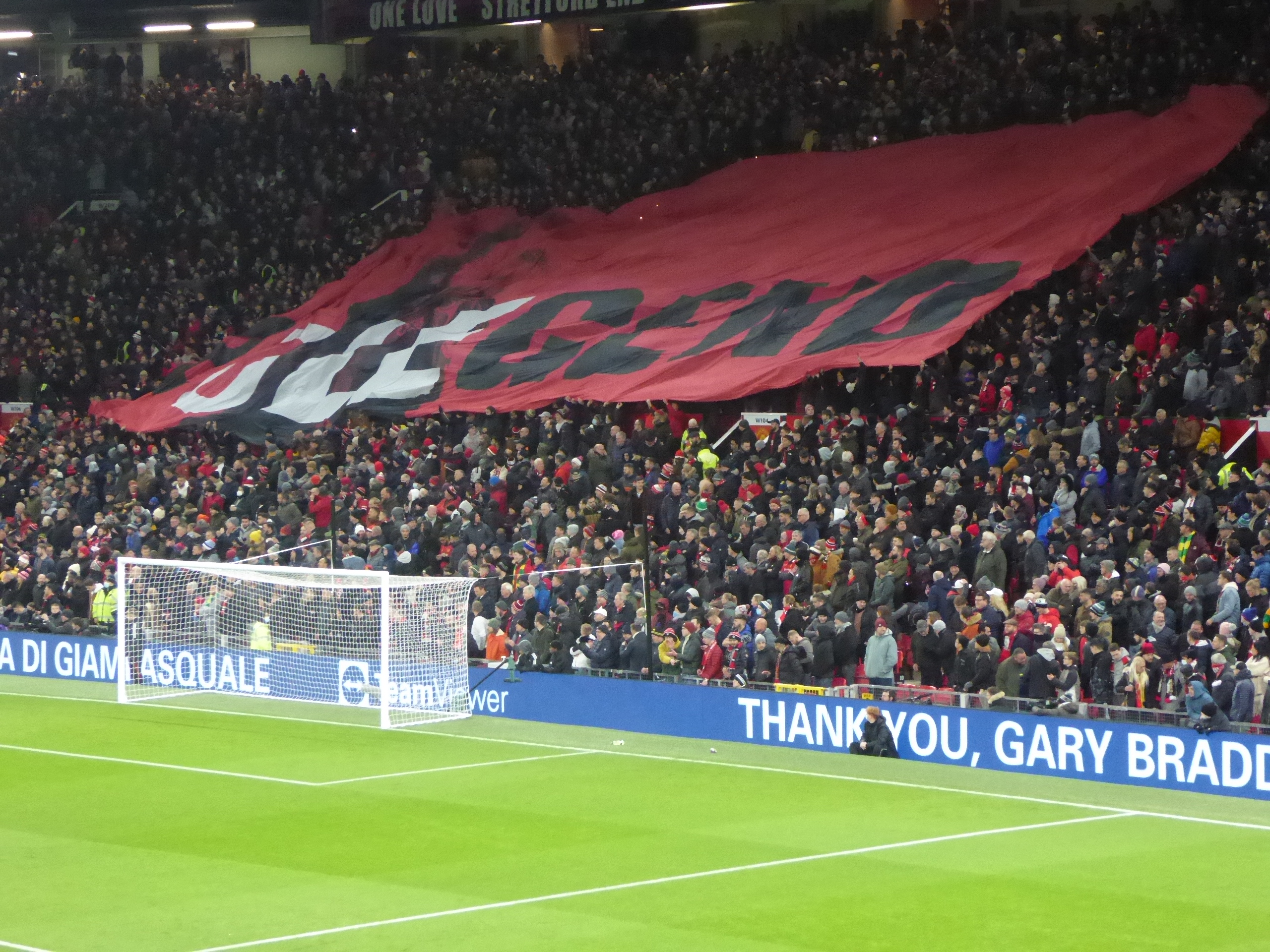
United fans hold up a banner in tribute to recently sacked manager Ole Gunnar Solskjær during the match against Arsenal on 2 December 2021.

United began December with a home encounter against old foes Arsenal. Emile Smith Rowe opened the scoring for Arsenal in the 13th minute with a volley from just outside the penalty area while De Gea lay injured in the middle of the goal after Fred had trodden on his ankle. After a VAR check, the goal was given after initially being disallowed. United equalised 31 minutes later when Fernandes scored for the first time in nearly three months. Ronaldo slotted home seven minutes after the break to bring United into the lead, scoring his 800th career goal in the process. Martin Ødegaard drew Arsenal level again two minutes later before giving away a penalty with a foul on Fred. Ronaldo sent the penalty down the middle of the goal to give United their first league win against Arsenal since 2018. Carrick left the club immediately after the match, and Ralf Rangnick took over for the game against Crystal Palace on 5 December, having been waiting to receive his work permit since his appointment on 29 November. United won 1–0 thanks to a goal from Fred in the 77th minute, and kept their first clean sheet at home in the league since beating West Ham 1–0 on 14 March. In their next match, United visited Norwich City and won 1–0 thanks to a penalty from Ronaldo in the 75th minute. Due to a COVID-19 outbreak in the United camp, the club's training ground was closed on 13 December for 24 hours and the match against Brentford scheduled for the next day was postponed; on 16 December, the home match against Brighton & Hove Albion was also postponed. The team played their first match post-outbreak on 27 December away to Newcastle. Allan Saint-Maximin scored within seven minutes before Cavani equalised in the second half. Three days later, United played the last Premier League match of 2021 against Burnley at home. Scott McTominay scored his first goal in nearly 11 months inside seven minutes. Ben Mee then scored an own goal after deflecting Sancho's shot slightly into the net. Ronaldo then scored the third goal three minutes before Aaron Lennon scored his first ever goal against United at the 38th minute as the hosts won 3–1 and finished the year in sixth place.

United started the year at home to Wolverhampton. Phil Jones was included in the starting line-up, playing a senior match for the first time in 23 months. Ronaldo's header was disallowed for offside before João Moutinho scored the winner at the 82nd minute to earn Wolves their first win at Old Trafford since 9 February 1980, when Wolverhampton also won 1–0. Twelve days later, they played away to Aston Villa. Fernandes scored twice to give United a 2–0 lead, before Jacob Ramsey scored the first on the 77th minute and assisted the equaliser for substitute Philippe Coutinho, who scored in the 81st minute to mark his Villa debut. The postponed match against Brentford was held on 19 January; Anthony Elanga scored his first competitive goal of the season seven minutes before Greenwood scored his first league goal since the defeat at Leicester on 16 October. Fifteen minutes later, Rashford made his first goal in all competitions since scoring at Tottenham on 30 October, eight minutes before Ivan Toney scored the consolation for the hosts as United became the first ever club to win 300 Premier League away matches. On 22 January, West Ham came to visit in United's final game prior to the Premier League winter break which took place during the non-European international break. Rashford scored the winning goal with just seconds of added time to go following an onside positioning and assist from Cavani.

Visiting Burnley on 8 February, United went ahead at 12th minute via Varane but the goal was ruled out after Maguire fouled Jay Rodriguez in the build-up. Six minutes later, they went ahead for real as Paul Pogba scored his first goal of the season following a pass from Shaw. An own goal from Josh Brownhill was disallowed before Rodriguez then levelled the scores just two minutes into the second half with an assist from Wout Weghorst. The next match saw Southampton's visit to Old Trafford for the first time since the 0–9 defeat a year and 10 days prior. Sancho opened the scoring in the first half but United conceded an early second-half goal again as Ché Adams levelled in the 48th minute. In the midweek United played at home against Brighton, a match that was postponed from December. After a goalless first half, Ronaldo scored his first goal in the new year following an assist from McTominay. Fernandes later scored a very late goal – his first at home this year, sealing the win for the hosts. Five days later, United visited Elland Road to face Roses rival Leeds. Maguire and Fernandes put the visitors two ahead in the first half before Rodrigo and Raphinha – the latter following an assist from former United player Daniel James – equalised via goals at the 53rd and 54th minutes. Two substitutes later scored the winners for Manchester United through Fred and Elanga as United scored more than three goals for the first time since September's win against Newcastle and the first time in the season that it was done away from home. Six days later United hosted Watford but eventually got their first goalless draw of the season.

United opened March with a visit to the City of Manchester Stadium for the Manchester derby. It took only five minutes for the league champions to score via Kevin De Bruyne. City academy graduate Sancho then equalised on his first match at City since his departure to Borussia Dortmund. However De Bruyne scored again six minutes later to hand City a half-time lead. Riyad Mahrez scored at 68th and 90th minutes to finish the match 4–1. This was the first time since 2018–19 league season that City won home and away against United, United's first defeat at City since 11 November 2018, and their heaviest away defeat against City since the 2013–14 season, when they were defeated by the same scoreline. On the next match against Tottenham Hotspur, Ronaldo scored his only second ever hat-trick for United, and the first since January 2008. Each of his goals sandwiched Harry Kane's 35th-minute penalty and Maguire's 72nd-minute own goal.

On 2 April, United faced Leicester at home. Kelechi Iheanacho struck first three minutes before Fred's equaliser. The next week, a single goal from Anthony Gordon secured a 1–0 win for the relegation-threatened Everton. Seven days later, Ronaldo scored two before goals from Kieran Dowell and Teemu Pukki equalised for Norwich. A Ronaldo free-kick secured his hat-trick and a 3–2 win. The following week, United lost 4–0 to rivals Liverpool on the Tuesday – Luis Díaz and Sadio Mané scored once each and Salah scored two – and 3–1 to Arsenal on the Saturday, in which Ronaldo scored his 100th Premier League goal; however, it was not enough to earn a point due to the goals from Nuno Tavares, Bukayo Saka and Granit Xhaka, as well as a missed penalty by Fernandes. United lost four straight away league matches for the first time since the 1980–81 season as a result. The last match of the month saw Chelsea came to visit. Marcos Alonso scored for the world champions at the hour mark before Ronaldo equalised and salvaged one point for United. The draw extended United's unbeaten league run against Chelsea, with the last time Chelsea won over United in the league was on 5 November 2017. However, with a maximum of nine points from three remaining games having just earned 55, United were assured of a maximum 64 points, which was already their lowest in the Premier League era, earned in the 2013–14 season. They also required to win all those three games to avoid a club record for the fewest wins in a Premier League season, set at 18 in 2016–17 and 2019–20.

In United's last home game of the season on 2 May against Brentford, Fernandes scored his 50th goal for the club after just nine minutes. Ronaldo scored a penalty before Varane sealed a 3–0 win with his first United goal. The next match saw United suffer their worst ever defeat against Brighton & Hove Albion by a score of 4–0, which meant they failed to qualify for the UEFA Champions League for the first time in three years. Moisés Caicedo, Marc Cucurella, Pascal Groß and Leandro Trossard scored one each without any reply as United broke the club record for fewest wins in a Premier League season. On the last match of the season, former United player Wilfried Zaha scored the game's only goal for Crystal Palace as United lost at Palace for the first time since May 1991. With 16 wins, 58 points, and a goal difference of zero, this was United's worst season since recording 13 wins, 48 points, and a −1 goal difference in 1989–90, when they finished 13th. They conceded 57 goals during the season, the most since the 1978–79 season, when they conceded 63.

Date	Opponents	H / A	Result F–A	Scorers	Attendance	League position
14 August 2021	Leeds United	H	5–1	Fernandes (3) 30', 54', 60', Greenwood 52', Fred 68'	72,732	1st
22 August 2021	Southampton	A	1–1	Greenwood 55'	29,485	5th
29 August 2021	Wolverhampton Wanderers	A	1–0	Greenwood 80'	30,621	3rd
11 September 2021	Newcastle United	H	4–1	Ronaldo (2) 45+2', 62', Fernandes 80', Lingard 90+2'	72,732	1st
19 September 2021	West Ham United	A	2–1	Ronaldo 35', Lingard 89'	59,958	3rd
25 September 2021	Aston Villa	H	0–1		72,922	4th
2 October 2021	Everton	H	1–1	Martial 43'	73,128	4th
16 October 2021	Leicester City	A	2–4	Greenwood 19', Rashford 82'	32,219	5th
24 October 2021	Liverpool	H	0–5		73,088	7th
30 October 2021	Tottenham Hotspur	A	3–0	Ronaldo 39', Cavani 64', Rashford 86'	60,356	5th
6 November 2021	Manchester City	H	0–2		73,086	5th
20 November 2021	Watford	A	1–4	Van de Beek 50'	21,087	7th
28 November 2021	Chelsea	A	1–1	Sancho 50'	40,041	8th
2 December 2021	Arsenal	H	3–2	Fernandes 44', Ronaldo (2) 52', 70' (pen.)	73,123	7th
5 December 2021	Crystal Palace	H	1–0	Fred 77'	73,172	6th
11 December 2021	Norwich City	A	1–0	Ronaldo 75' (pen.)	27,606	5th
27 December 2021	Newcastle United	A	1–1	Cavani 71'	52,178	7th
30 December 2021	Burnley	H	3–1	McTominay 8', Mee 27' (o.g.), Ronaldo 35'	73,121	6th
3 January 2022	Wolverhampton Wanderers	H	0–1		73,045	7th
15 January 2022	Aston Villa	A	2–2	Fernandes (2) 6', 67'	41,968	7th
19 January 2022 (Note: The Premier League matches away to Brentford on 14 December 2021 and at home to Brighton & Hove Albion on 18 December 2021 were postponed due to an outbreak of COVID-19 in the Manchester United squad.)	Brentford	A	3–1	Elanga 55', Greenwood 62', Rashford 77'	17,094	7th
22 January 2022	West Ham United	H	1–0	Rashford 90+3'	73,130	4th
8 February 2022	Burnley	A	1–1	Pogba 18'	21,233	6th
12 February 2022	Southampton	H	1–1	Sancho 21'	73,084	5th
15 February 2022	Brighton & Hove Albion	H	2–0	Ronaldo 51', Fernandes 90+7'	73,012	4th
20 February 2022	Leeds United	A	4–2	Maguire 34', Fernandes 45+5', Fred 70', Elanga 88'	36,715	4th
26 February 2022	Watford	H	0–0		73,152	4th
6 March 2022	Manchester City	A	1–4	Sancho 22'	53,165	5th
12 March 2022	Tottenham Hotspur	H	3–2	Ronaldo (3) 12', 38', 81'	73,458	5th
2 April 2022	Leicester City	H	1–1	Fred 66'	73,444	7th
9 April 2022	Everton	A	0–1		39,080	7th
16 April 2022	Norwich City	H	3–2	Ronaldo (3) 7', 32', 76'	73,381	5th
19 April 2022 (Note: The Premier League match away to Liverpool, originally scheduled for 20 March 2022, was postponed due to Liverpool's involvement in the FA Cup quarter-finals.)	Liverpool	A	0–4		52,686	6th
23 April 2022	Arsenal	A	1–3	Ronaldo 34'	60,223	6th
28 April 2022 (Note: The Premier League match at home to Chelsea, originally scheduled for 15 May 2022, was brought forward due to Chelsea's involvement in the FA Cup final.)	Chelsea	H	1–1	Ronaldo 62'	73,564	6th
2 May 2022	Brentford	H	3–0	Fernandes 9', Ronaldo 61' (pen.), Varane 72'	73,482	6th
7 May 2022	Brighton & Hove Albion	A	0–4		31,637	6th
22 May 2022	Crystal Palace	A	0–1		25,434	6th

=== League table ===
Pos	Team	Pld	W	D	L	GF	GA	GD	Pts	Qualification or relegation
4	Tottenham Hotspur	38	22	5	11	69	40	+29	71	Qualification for the Champions League group stage
5	Arsenal	38	22	3	13	61	48	+13	69	Qualification for the Europa League group stage (Note: Since the winners of the 2021–22 FA Cup and the 2021–22 EFL Cup, Liverpool, qualified for the Champions League, the spot given to the FA Cup winners (Europa League group stage) was passed to the sixth-placed team and the spot given to the League Cup winners (Europa Conference League play-off round) was passed to the seventh-placed team.)
6	Manchester United	38	16	10	12	57	57	0	58	Qualification for the Europa League group stage
7	West Ham United	38	16	8	14	60	51	+9	56	Qualification for the Europa Conference League play-off round
8	Leicester City	38	14	10	14	62	59	+3	52	

Source: Premier League
Rules for classification: 1) Points; 2) Goal difference; 3) Goals scored; 4) If the champions, relegated teams or qualified teams for UEFA competitions cannot be determined by rules 1 to 3, rules 4.1 to 4.3 are applied – 4.1) Points gained in head-to-head record between such teams; 4.2) Away goals scored in head-to-head record between such teams; 4.3) Play-offs

== FA Cup ==
As a Premier League side, Manchester United entered the FA Cup in the third round proper. The draw took place on 6 December, and United were given a home draw with Aston Villa. The match was played on 10 January 2022. Villa had two goals disallowed for offside as Scott McTominay scored the only goal in a 1–0 win for United. United drew Championship side Middlesbrough in the fourth round proper. Cristiano Ronaldo missed a penalty five minutes before Jadon Sancho opened the scoring. A handball by former United academy player Duncan Watmore was ruled accidental by referee Anthony Taylor and video assistant referee Stuart Attwell per the new IFAB rule, meaning the 64th-minute equaliser from Matt Crooks, who also formerly a United academy player, stood. After going through extra time, United and Middlesbrough scored all their first seven penalties in the shoot-out, including one from former United defender Paddy McNair. Lee Peltier scored the eighth penalty before Anthony Elanga missed his and condemned United to their earliest FA Cup exit since the third round defeat in the 2013–14 season and the first time in the fourth round since 2011–12. This was also United's first FA Cup elimination by a lower division side since their elimination by Leeds United, then a Championship side as well, in the 2009–10 third round and the first FA Cup defeat on penalties since the 2008–09 semi-finals, as they are yet to win an FA Cup match shoot-out. For Middlesbrough, this was their second consecutive cup triumph over United, having also won on penalties at Old Trafford in the 2015–16 League Cup fourth round.

Date	Opponents	H / A	Result F–A	Scorers	Attendance
10 January 2022	Aston Villa	H	1–0	McTominay 8'	72,911
4 February 2022	Middlesbrough	H	1–1 (a.e.t.) (7–8p)	Sancho 25'	71,871

== EFL Cup ==
As one of the seven English clubs competing in UEFA competitions in 2021–22, United entered the 2021–22 EFL Cup in the third round. The draw took place on 25 August and United were drawn at home to West Ham United; the match was played on 22 September, just three days after the two sides met in the league. Manuel Lanzini scored the only goal of the game in the ninth minute, giving West Ham their first win at Old Trafford in all competitions since the last day of the 2006–07 FA Premier League season. This was Manchester United's first League Cup third round exit since the 2018–19 season.

Date	Opponents	H / A	Result F–A	Scorers	Attendance
22 September 2021	West Ham United	H	0–1		72,468

== UEFA Champions League ==
=== Group stage ===
Having finished in second place in the 2020–21 Premier League, Manchester United qualified automatically for the group stage of the 2021–22 UEFA Champions League. The group stage draw took place on 26 August 2021. They were drawn against Swiss champions Young Boys, Atalanta from Italy and Villarreal of Spain. United had faced Villarreal in the 2021 UEFA Europa League Final, as well as the 2005–06 and 2008–09 Champions League group stages; all ended as draws. United faced Young Boys in the 2018–19 UEFA Champions League group stage, during which United won both matches.

In the first match, United were away to Young Boys and took the lead in the 13th minute when Cristiano Ronaldo shot through the goalkeeper's legs after a cross from Bruno Fernandes. In the 35th minute, Aaron Wan-Bissaka was sent off for stamping on Christopher Martins' ankle. Moumi Ngamaleu equalised for Young Boys in the 66th minute, before a back-pass from Jesse Lingard in the 95th minute allowed Jordan Pefok to score the winner for the home side. Wan-Bissaka was given a two-match suspension for his red card and missed the next game against Villarreal at Old Trafford, along with fellow defenders Shaw and Maguire. Villarreal's Paco Alcácer opened the scoring in the 53rd minute, United's left-back Alex Telles – starting in place of Shaw – equalised with a long-range shot seven minutes later, scoring his first goal for United. Ronaldo, who broke the record for most Champions League appearances on the night, then scored the winning goal in the fifth minute of added time to give United their first ever win against Villarreal.

Three weeks later, United hosted Atalanta for the first time at Old Trafford, and the away side were 2–0 up within the first half-hour, as Mario Pašalić scored in the 15th minute before Merih Demiral doubled their lead in the 28th. Marcus Rashford scored eight minutes after the interval to halve the deficit before captain Harry Maguire scored the equaliser with 15 minutes left in normal time. Ronaldo then scored the winner for the second match in a row, heading home Luke Shaw's cross nine minutes from time. United again went behind early in the return match away to Atalanta, as Josip Iličić put the Italian side ahead in the 12th minute. Ronaldo equalised in first-half injury time, assisted by a backheel from Fernandes, making him the first Manchester United player to score in four consecutive Champions League matches since Ruud van Nistelrooy in 2003. Atalanta went back in front just over 10 minutes into the second half through Duván Zapata, only for Ronaldo to score another late goal to save a point for United. United then visited Villarreal in caretaker manager Carrick's first game in charge. Ronaldo opened the scoring 12 minutes from time, before Jadon Sancho scored his first goal for the club as they secured qualification for the round of 16 for the first time since the 2018–19 season. Atalanta's 3–3 draw with Young Boys later that night secured top spot for United. The final group game saw Rangnick change all 11 starters from the league game against Crystal Palace – including Ronaldo who was left out of the matchday squad, denying him the opportunity to become the first player to score in all six Champions League group stage matches for a second time. Rangnick named just seven of a possible 11 substitutes and gave three academy graduates their first-team debuts: Tom Heaton, Zidane Iqbal and Charlie Savage. Another academy graduate Mason Greenwood open the scoring inside nine minutes before Donny van de Beek made a mistake that allowed Fabian Rieder to equalise and end the match at 1–1.

Date	Opponents	H / A	Result F–A	Scorers	Attendance	Group position
14 September 2021	Young Boys	A	1–2	Ronaldo 13'	31,120	4th
29 September 2021	Villarreal	H	2–1	Telles 60', Ronaldo 90+5'	73,130	3rd
20 October 2021	Atalanta	H	3–2	Rashford 53', Maguire 75', Ronaldo 81'	72,279	1st
2 November 2021	Atalanta	A	2–2	Ronaldo (2) 45+1', 90+1'	14,443	1st
23 November 2021	Villarreal	A	2–0	Ronaldo 78', Sancho 90'	20,875	1st
8 December 2021	Young Boys	H	1–1	Greenwood 9'	73,156	1st

Group F
Pos	Team	Pld	W	D	L	GF	GA	GD	Pts	Qualification
1	(England) Manchester United	6	3	2	1	11	8	+3	11	Advance to knockout phase
2	(Spain) Villarreal	6	3	1	2	12	9	+3	10	Advance to knockout phase
3	(Italy) Atalanta	6	1	3	2	12	13	−1	6	Transfer to Europa League
4	(Switzerland) Young Boys	6	1	2	3	7	12	−5	5	

Source: UEFA
Rules for classification: Group stage tiebreakers

=== Knockout phase ===
The draw for the round of 16 was held on 13 December 2021 at the UEFA headquarters in Nyon, Switzerland. Having finishing top of their group, United could be drawn against one of the non-English clubs that finished second in another group: Paris Saint-Germain, Atlético Madrid, Sporting CP, Internazionale, Benfica or Red Bull Salzburg. United were originally drawn against Paris Saint-Germain, whom they had met in the previous season's group stage and in the round of 16 two seasons before that; however, technical issues during the original draw meant it was declared void and would be redone entirely at 15:00 CET. United were then redrawn against Atlético Madrid, who won the only previous meeting between the two clubs in the 1991–92 European Cup Winners' Cup.

On 23 February, United visited the Metropolitano Stadium for the first time ever; the previous meeting between the two having been played at the now-demolished Vicente Calderón Stadium. João Félix opened the scoring for Atlético with a diving header past former Atlético goalkeeper David de Gea in the 7th minute, before Anthony Elanga scored the equaliser following a pass from Bruno Fernandes 10 minutes from time; this made Fernandes the first player in Champions League history to assist in six consecutive appearances for an English club, breaking the record held by David Beckham – also for United – since 1998, while Elanga became United's youngest ever goalscorer in the Champions League knockout stage at 19 years 302 days. In the second leg at home, a 41st-minute header from Renan Lodi was enough to eliminate United in the round of 16 for the first time since the 2017–18 season.

Date	Round	Opponents	H / A	Result F–A	Scorers	Attendance
23 February 2022	Round of 16; First leg	Atlético Madrid	A	1–1	Elanga 80'	63,273
15 March 2022	Round of 16; Second leg	Atlético Madrid	H	0–1		73,008

== Squad statistics ==
As of 22 May 2022

No.	Pos.	Name	League		FA Cup		EFL Cup		Europe		Total		Discipline	
No.	Pos.	Name	Apps	Goals	Apps	Goals	Apps	Goals	Apps	Goals	Apps	Goals	Yellow card	Red card
1	GK	(Spain) David de Gea	38	0	1	0	0	0	7	0	46	0	0	0
2	DF	(Sweden) Victor Lindelöf	26(2)	0	1	0	1	0	5	0	33(2)	0	5	0
3	DF	(Ivory Coast) Eric Bailly	3(1)	0	0	0	1	0	2	0	6(1)	0	1	0
4	DF	(England) Phil Jones	2(2)	0	0(1)	0	0	0	0	0	2(3)	0	0	0
5	DF	(England) Harry Maguire (c)	28(2)	1	1	0	0	0	6	1	35(2)	2	9	1
6	MF	(France) Paul Pogba	16(4)	1	1	0	0	0	4(2)	0	21(6)	1	8	1
7 (Note: Edinson Cavani wore number 7 until 2 September 2021, following the departure of Daniel James to Leeds United, whom Cavani replaced as number 21; Cristiano Ronaldo replaced him as number 7.)	FW	(Portugal) Cristiano Ronaldo	27(3)	18	1	0	0	0	7	6	35(3)	24	9	0
8	MF	(Spain) Juan Mata	2(5)	0	0(1)	0	1	0	1(2)	0	4(8)	0	0	0
9	FW	(France) Anthony Martial	2(6)	1	0	0	1	0	1(1)	0	4(7)	1	0	0
10	FW	(England) Marcus Rashford	13(12)	4	2	0	0	0	3(2)	1	18(14)	5	3	0
11	FW	(England) Mason Greenwood	16(2)	5	1	0	0(1)	0	3(1)	1	20(4)	6	2	0
13	GK	(England) Lee Grant	0	0	0	0	0	0	0	0	0	0	0	0
14	MF	(England) Jesse Lingard	2(14)	2	0(1)	0	1	0	1(3)	0	4(18)	2	1	0
15	MF	(Brazil) Andreas Pereira	0	0	0	0	0	0	0	0	0	0	0	0
16	FW	(Ivory Coast) Amad Diallo	0	0	0	0	0	0	1	0	1	0	0	0
17	MF	(Brazil) Fred	24(4)	4	1(1)	0	0	0	5(1)	0	30(6)	4	8	0
18	MF	(Portugal) Bruno Fernandes	35(1)	10	2	0	0(1)	0	6(1)	0	43(3)	10	10	0
19	DF	(France) Raphaël Varane	20(2)	1	2	0	0	0	4(1)	0	26(3)	1	1	0
20	DF	(Portugal) Diogo Dalot	19(5)	0	2	0	1	0	2(1)	0	24(6)	0	6	0
21	MF	(Wales) Daniel James	2	0	0	0	0	0	0	0	2	0	0	0
21	FW	(Uruguay) Edinson Cavani	7(8)	2	1	0	0	0	0(4)	0	8(12)	2	1	0
22	GK	(England) Tom Heaton	0	0	0	0	0	0	0(1)	0	0(1)	0	0	0
23	DF	(England) Luke Shaw	19(1)	0	2	0	0	0	5	0	26(1)	0	11	0
25	FW	(England) Jadon Sancho	20(9)	3	1	1	1	0	5(2)	1	27(11)	5	0	0
26	GK	(England) Dean Henderson	0	0	1	0	1	0	1	0	3	0	0	0
27	DF	(Brazil) Alex Telles	18(3)	0	0	0	1	0	3(1)	1	22(4)	1	2	0
29	DF	(England) Aaron Wan-Bissaka	20	0	0	0	0	0	5(1)	0	25(1)	0	2	1
31	MF	(Serbia) Nemanja Matić	16(7)	0	0	0	1	0	1(7)	0	18(14)	0	5	0
33	DF	(England) Brandon Williams	0	0	0	0	0	0	0	0	0	0	0	0
34	MF	(Netherlands) Donny van de Beek	0(8)	1	0(1)	0	1	0	3(1)	0	4(10)	1	1	0
36	FW	(Sweden) Anthony Elanga	14(7)	2	0(2)	0	0(1)	0	2(1)	1	16(11)	3	0	0
37	MF	(England) James Garner	0	0	0	0	0	0	0	0	0	0	0	0
39	MF	(Scotland) Scott McTominay	28(2)	1	2	1	0	0	5	0	35(2)	2	10	0
43	DF	(England) Teden Mengi	0	0	0	0	0	0	0(1)	0	0(1)	0	0	0
46	MF	(Tunisia) Hannibal Mejbri	1(1)	0	0	0	0	0	0	0	1(1)	0	2	0
47	FW	(England) Shola Shoretire	0(1)	0	0	0	0	0	0(1)	0	0(2)	0	1	0
51	GK	(Czech Republic) Matěj Kovář	0	0	0	0	0	0	0	0	0	0	0	0
72	MF	(Wales) Charlie Savage	0	0	0	0	0	0	0(1)	0	0(1)	0	0	0
73	MF	(Iraq) Zidane Iqbal	0	0	0	0	0	0	0(1)	0	0(1)	0	0	0
75	FW	(Argentina) Alejandro Garnacho	0(2)	0	0	0	0	0	0	0	0(2)	0	0	0
Own goals			–	1	–	0	–	0	–	0	–	1	N/A	

== Transfers ==
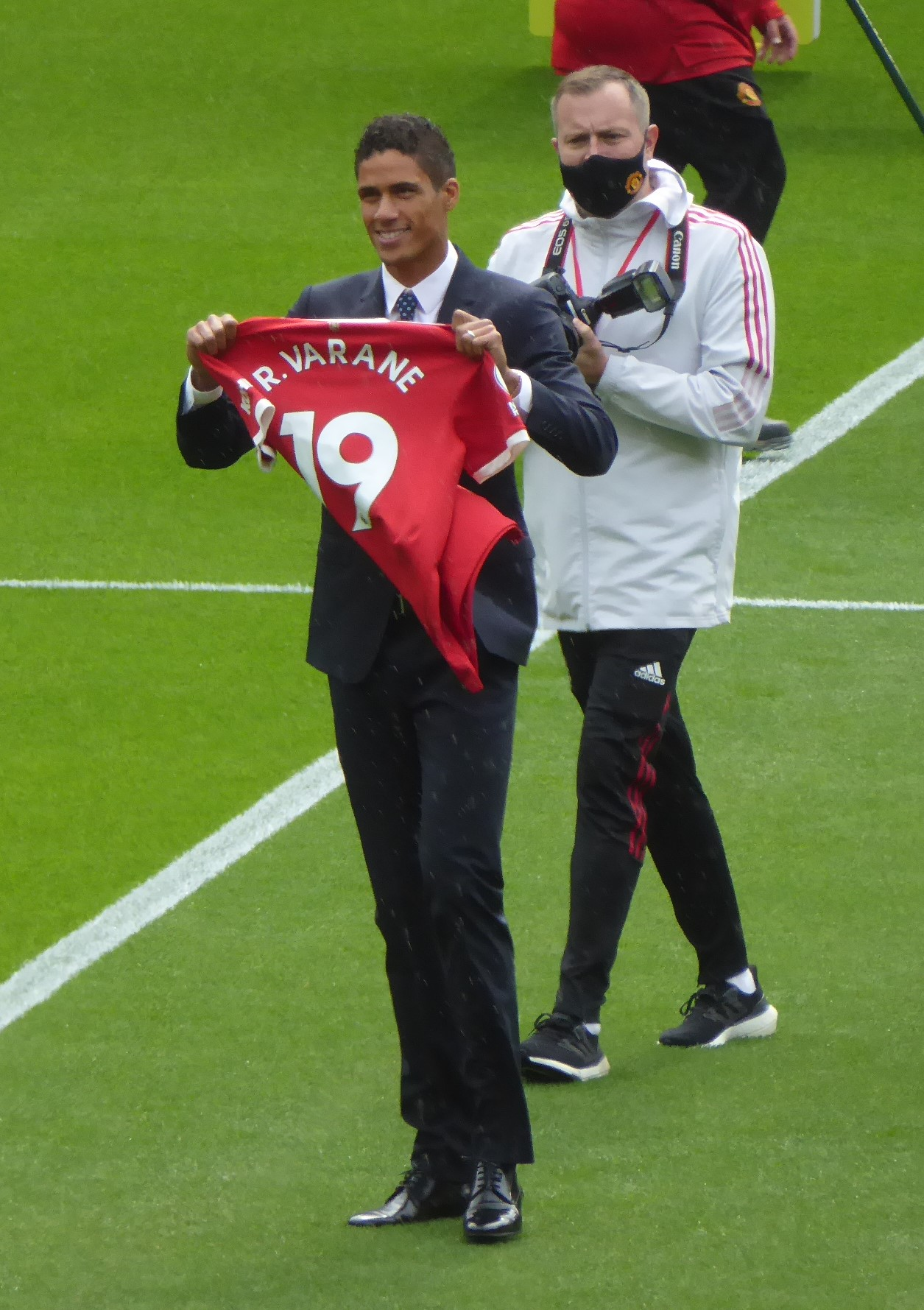
Raphaël Varane was announced as a Manchester United player ahead of the Roses derby on the opening day of the season.

=== In ===
Date	Pos.	Name	From	Fee	Ref.
2 July 2021	GK	(England) Tom Heaton	Unattached (Note: Most recently played for Aston Villa)	Free	
23 July 2021	FW	(England) Jadon Sancho	(Germany) Borussia Dortmund	€85 million	
23 July 2021	DF	(Republic of Ireland) Paul McShane	(England) Rochdale	Undisclosed	
14 August 2021	DF	(France) Raphaël Varane	(Spain) Real Madrid	€34 Million (Note: Fee reported as £34 million, plus £8 million in add-ons)	
31 August 2021	FW	(Portugal) Cristiano Ronaldo	(Italy) Juventus	€15 million (Note: Rising to €23 million if all additional clauses met)	

=== Out ===
Date	Pos.	Name	To	Fee	Ref.
7 June 2021	DF	(England) Oliver Kilner	(England) Oldham Athletic	Undisclosed	
29 June 2021	GK	(Sweden) Johan Guadagno	(Denmark) Copenhagen	Undisclosed	
30 June 2021	GK	(England) Jacob Carney	Released (Note: Joined Sunderland after release)		
30 June 2021	MF	(England) Mark Helm	Released (Note: Joined Burnley after release)		
30 June 2021	DF	(Wales) Iestyn Hughes	Released (Note: Joined Leicester City after release)		
30 June 2021	GK	(Portugal) Joel Castro Pereira	Released (Note: Joined RKC Waalwijk after release)		
30 June 2021	MF	(Spain) Arnau Puigmal	Released (Note: Joined Almería after release)		
30 June 2021	GK	(Argentina) Sergio Romero	Released (Note: Joined Venezia after release)		
30 June 2021	DF	(England) Max Taylor	Released (Note: Joined Rochdale after release)		
30 June 2021	MF	(France) Aliou Traoré	Released (Note: Joined Parma after release)		
30 July 2021	MF	(Republic of Ireland) Charlie McCann	(Scotland) Rangers	Undisclosed	
31 August 2021	MF	(Wales) Daniel James	(England) Leeds United	Undisclosed (Note: Fee reported as £25 million)	
31 January 2022	FW	(Netherlands) Dillon Hoogewerf	(Germany) Borussia Mönchengladbach	Undisclosed	
23 March 2022	GK	(England) Paul Woolston	Retired		

=== Loan out ===
Date from	Date to	Pos.	Name	To	Ref.
1 July 2021	End of season	GK	(England) Nathan Bishop	(England) Mansfield Town	
2 July 2021	28 January 2022	DF	(England) Reece Devine	(Scotland) St Johnstone	
9 July 2021	End of season	FW	(Netherlands) Tahith Chong	(England) Birmingham City	
23 July 2021	7 January 2022	DF	(England) Will Fish	(England) Stockport County	
30 July 2021	End of season	DF	(England) Di'Shon Bernard	(England) Hull City	
5 August 2021	End of season	MF	(Uruguay) Facundo Pellistri	(Spain) Alavés	
8 August 2021	8 January 2022	DF	(England) Axel Tuanzebe	(England) Aston Villa	
13 August 2021	End of season	MF	(Northern Ireland) Ethan Galbraith	(England) Doncaster Rovers	
16 August 2021	6 January 2022	DF	(England) Ethan Laird	(Wales) Swansea City	
20 August 2021	End of season	MF	(Wales) Dylan Levitt	(Scotland) Dundee United	
21 August 2021	End of season	MF	(Brazil) Andreas Pereira	(Brazil) Flamengo	
22 August 2021	End of season	MF	(England) James Garner	(England) Nottingham Forest	
23 August 2021	End of season	DF	(England) Brandon Williams	(England) Norwich City	
28 August 2021	19 January 2022	FW	(England) D'Mani Mellor	(England) Salford City	
4 January 2022	End of season	DF	(England) Teden Mengi	(England) Birmingham City	
6 January 2022	End of season	DF	(England) Ethan Laird	(England) Bournemouth	
8 January 2022	End of season	DF	(England) Axel Tuanzebe	(Italy) Napoli	
25 January 2022	End of season	FW	(France) Anthony Martial	(Spain) Sevilla	
27 January 2022	End of season	FW	(Ivory Coast) Amad Diallo	(Scotland) Rangers	
28 January 2022	End of season	DF	(England) Reece Devine	(England) Walsall	
31 January 2022	End of season	MF	(Netherlands) Donny van de Beek	(England) Everton	
31 January 2022	End of season	GK	(Czech Republic) Matěj Kovář	(England) Burton Albion	
