= 2021–22 St Johnstone F.C. season =

Football club season review

St Johnstone
2021–22 season
- Chairman: Steve Brown
- Manager: Callum Davidson
- Stadium: McDiarmid Park
- Premiership: 11th
- Premiership play-off: Winners
- Scottish Cup: Fourth round
- League Cup: Semi-finals
- Europa League: Third qualifying round
- Conference League: Play-off round
- Top goalscorer: League: Callum Hendry (9); All: Callum Hendry (9)
- Highest home attendance: 9,106 vs. Galatasaray, Europa League, 12 August 2021
- Lowest home attendance: 500 vs. Celtic, 26 December 2021
- Average home league attendance: 3,500
- Biggest win: 4–0 v Inverness CT (home), 23 May 2022
- Biggest defeat: 0–7 v Celtic (away), 9 April 2022
Home colours	Away colours

The 2021–22 season was St Johnstone's ninth season in the Scottish Premiership and their 13th consecutive season (following four in the former Scottish Premier League) in the top flight of Scottish football. The club also competed in the Scottish Cup, the League Cup, and the UEFA Europa League, having won both domestic cups the previous season.

Under the continued management of Callum Davidson, St Johnstone were confident of building upon the previous season's success but the departures of some key players left the team in transition and results through the autumn of 2021 were poor. Avoiding relegation became the priority and Saints were ultimately successful in that, although they finished eleventh (out of twelve) and had to overcome the challenge of Inverness Caledonian Thistle in the two-leg Premiership playoff. There were hopes that the team might retain the League Cup as they reached the semi-final but they went down by a single goal to eventual winners Celtic. Saints fared less well in the Scottish Cup, losing on their first appearance to League Two club Kelty Hearts.

In Europe, Saints played in the UEFA Europa League against Galatasaray and the inaugural UEFA Europa Conference League against Linzer ASK. They played well away from home to gain draws in the first legs of both these matches, only to be well beaten at home in the second leg.

== Season summary ==
Still managed by Callum Davidson, St Johnstone hoped to build upon their double success in the 2020–21 domestic cup competitions. The team underwent some changes, however, particularly the departures of Jason Kerr and Ali McCann in August 2021. In the league, the team struggled to avoid relegation and eventually finished eleventh, six points adrift of Aberdeen in tenth place but six points clear of bottom club Dundee, who were automatically relegated.

By finishing eleventh, St Johnstone had to take part in the Premiership playoff where they met Inverness CT over two legs (home and away). The first leg was played at Caley Thistle's Caledonian Stadium on 20 May and ended in a 2–2 draw after Saints had led 2–0 at half-time. In the home leg at McDiarmid Park three days later, Saints were clear winners by 4–0, the team's biggest victory of the whole season. They thus won the playoff with a 6–2 aggregate to retain Premiership status in the 2022–23 season.

Hoping to repeat their domestic cup successes of the previous season, Saints reached the semi-final of the League Cup with victories over Arbroath and Dundee. They met Celtic in the semi-final at Hampden Park on 20 November and lost 1–0 to the eventual tournament winners. The defeat by Celtic ended an 11-game unbeaten run by Saints in domestic cup football. Saints entered the Scottish Cup in the fourth round with an away tie at League Two club Kelty Hearts, who had been newly promoted to the SPFL that season. The match was played at New Central Park on 22 January before a full house of 2,183. Having been goalless at full time, the match went into extra time and Kelty achieved a surprise victory over the cupholders with a goal in the 103rd minute.

St Johnstone's domestic cup wins in 2020–21 qualified the team for the 2021–22 UEFA Europa League. They joined the competition in the third qualifying round with a two-legged tie against Galatasaray. The first leg was played in Istanbul on 5 August. Saints took the lead after 58 minutes with a penalty goal by Jason Kerr, who left the club soon afterwards. Two minutes later, Sacha Boey equalised for Galatasaray and the match ended 1–1. The second leg was played in Perth on 12 August and attracted a crowd of 9,106, the highest attendance of the season at McDiarmid Park. Saints played well with a hard-fought performance but were overcome by three second half goals which consigned them to a 4–2 defeat (5–3 aggregate). The defeat meant Saints could enter the inaugural UEFA Europa Conference League which they joined in the playoff round with a tie against Austria's Linzer ASK (aka LASK). The matches were on 19 and 26 August. In the first leg at the Wörthersee Stadion, Saints drew 1–1 after taking a 17th minute lead with a goal by Chris Kane. As with Galatasaray, however, the home leg ended in defeat. Both David Wotherspoon and Shaun Rooney were sent off. Linz scored twice in the last twenty minutes to win 2–0 and take the tie 3–1 on aggregate.

Following the Premiership playoff victory over Caley Thistle which ended the season, Callum Davidson commented that Saints "have a lot of work to do" to compete with the best in 2022–23 and "need to make sure we're up competing just to stay in the league". He pointed out that many of the rival clubs "are spending money", including newly promoted Kilmarnock.

== Competitions ==
Win Draw Loss Postponed

=== Scottish Premiership ===
31 July 2021 1	Ross County	0–0	St Johnstone	Dingwall
15:00 BST	White (yellow card) 31'; Samuel (yellow card) 52'; Spittal (yellow card) 67'; Donaldson (yellow card) 70'	Report	McCann (penalty missed) 70; Rooney (yellow card) 71'	Stadium: Victoria Park; Attendance: 1,990; Referee: Colin Steven

8 August 2021 2	St Johnstone	1–1	Motherwell	Perth
15:00 BST	O'Donnell 34' (o.g.); Wotherspoon (yellow card) 62'; Craig (yellow card) 67'	Report	Watt 80'; O'Donnell (yellow card) 90'	Stadium: McDiarmid Park; Attendance: 2,169; Referee: Nick Walsh

21 August 2021 3	St Johnstone	0–1	Dundee United	Perth
15:00 BST	Rooney (yellow card) 79'	Report	Robson (yellow card) 21'; Pawlett 60', (yellow card) 61' (yellow-red card) 78'; McNulty (yellow card) 75'	Stadium: McDiarmid Park; Attendance: 5,716; Referee: Don Robertson

28 August 2021 4	St Mirren	0–0	St Johnstone	Paisley
15:00 BST	Erhahon (yellow card) 73' (yellow-red card) 90+2'; Shaughnessy (yellow card) 89'	Report	McCann (yellow card) 26'; Craig (yellow card) 45'; Wotherspoon (yellow card) 61'	Stadium: St Mirren Park; Attendance: 4,326; Referee: David Dickinson

11 September 2021 5	St Johnstone	1–2	Rangers	Perth
12:30 BST	Muller (yellow card) 41'; O'Halloran 51'; Rooney (yellow card) 59'; Craig (yellow card) 59'	Report	McLaughlin (yellow card) 10'; Roofe 58' (pen.), (yellow card) 59'; Morelos (yellow card) 59'; Tavernier 79'	Stadium: McDiarmid Park; Attendance: 7,319; Referee: Willie Collum

18 September 2021 6	Aberdeen	0–1	St Johnstone	Aberdeen
15:00 BST	Emmanuel-Thomas (yellow card) 32'	Report	O'Halloran (yellow card) 8'; Brown (yellow card) 35'; Davidson (yellow card) 56'; May 84'	Stadium: Pittodrie Stadium; Attendance: 13,007; Referee: Bobby Madden

26 September 2021 7	Hibernian	1–0	St Johnstone	Edinburgh
15:00 BST	Boyle 61' (pen.)	Report		Stadium: Easter Road; Attendance: 13,263; Referee: John Beaton

2 October 2021 8	St Johnstone	3–1	Dundee	Perth
15:00	Kane 31', 39'; May 46'	Report	Sweeney 74'	Stadium: McDiarmid Park; Attendance: 5,097; Referee: Greg Aitken

16 October 2021 9	St Johnstone	0–3	Livingston	Perth
15:00 BST		Report	Bailey 3'; Anderson 29'; Pittman 66'	Stadium: McDiarmid Park; Attendance: 4,274; Referee: Grant Irvine

23 October 2021 10	Celtic	2–0	St Johnstone	Glasgow
15:00 BST	Giakoumakis 34'; Juranovic 80' (pen.)	BBC Sport; Celtic Report		Stadium: Celtic Park; Referee: Nick Walsh

27 October 2021 11	St Johnstone	1–1	Heart of Midlothian	Perth
19:45 BST	Gordon 11'	BBC Sport	Ginnelly 40'	Stadium: McDiarmid Park; Attendance: 6,083; Referee: Steven McLean

30 October 2021 12	Dundee United	0–1	St Johnstone	Dundee
15:00 BST		BBC Sport	Ali Crawford 17'	Stadium: Tannadice Park; Attendance: 7,580; Referee: Grant Irvine

6 November 2021 13	St Johnstone	0–0	St Mirren	Perth
15:00 GMT	Kane (yellow card) 54' (yellow-red card) 86'	BBC Sport		Stadium: McDiarmid Park; Attendance: 3,482; Referee: Greg Aitken

27 November 2021 14	St Johnstone	1–2	Hibernian	Perth
15:00 GMT	Porteous 40' (o.g.); Bryson (yellow card) 27' (yellow-red card) 45+1'	BBC Sport	Nisbet 83'; Murphy 86'	Stadium: McDiarmid Park; Attendance: 3,362; Referee: Euan Anderson

1 December 2021 15	Dundee	1–0	St Johnstone	Dundee
19:45 GMT	Mullen 39'	BBC Sport		Stadium: Dens Park; Attendance: 5,196; Referee: Andrew Dallas

11 December 2021 16	St Johnstone	0–1	Aberdeen	Perth
15:00 GMT		BBC Sport	Jenks 83'	Stadium: McDiarmid Park; Attendance: 3,791; Referee: Greg Aitken

15 December 2021 17	Rangers	2–0	St Johnstone	Glasgow
19:45 GMT	Morelos 43'; Kent 49'	BBC Sport		Stadium: Ibrox Stadium; Attendance: 47,561; Referee: Euan Anderson

18 December 2021 18	Motherwell	2–0	St Johnstone	Motherwell
15:00 GMT	Cornelius 17' van Veen 55'	BBC Sport		Stadium: Fir Park; Attendance: 3,920; Referee: Nick Walsh

22 December 2021 19	St Johnstone	1–2	Ross County	Perth
19:45 GMT	Butterfield 19'	BBC Sport	Charles-Cook 15'; Callachan 69'	Stadium: McDiarmid Park; Attendance: 2,249; Referee: Willie Collum

26 December 2021 20	St Johnstone	1–3	Celtic	Perth
19:45 GMT	Kane 69'	BBC Sport	Abada 9', 22'; Bitton 82'	Stadium: McDiarmid Park; Attendance: 500; Referee: Bobby Madden

18 January 2022 21	Heart of Midlothian	2–0	St Johnstone	Edinburgh
19:45 GMT	Ginnelly 46', 75'	BBC Sport		Stadium: Tynecastle Park; Attendance: 16,589; Referee: Nick Walsh

26 January 2022 22	St Johnstone	0–0	Dundee	Perth
19:45 GMT		BBC Sport		Stadium: McDiarmid Park; Attendance: 4,135; Referee: Bobby Madden

1 February 2022 23	Livingston	1–2	St Johnstone	Livingston
19:45 GMT	Anderson 34'; Nouble (red card) 90+2'	BBC Sport	Hendry 11'; Crawford 90'	Stadium: Almondvale Stadium; Referee: Craig Napier

5 February 2022 24	St Johnstone	0–0	Dundee United	Perth
19:45 GMT	Hallberg (red card) 53'	BBC Sport		Stadium: McDiarmid Park; Attendance: 5,005; Referee: Colin Steven

9 February 2022 25	St Mirren	2–1	St Johnstone	Paisley
19:45 GMT	Ronan 42' (pen.); Greive 49'	BBC Sport	Hendry 28' (pen.)	Stadium: St Mirren Park; Referee: David Dickinson

15 February 2022 26	Aberdeen	1–1	St Johnstone	Aberdeen
19:45 GMT	Ferguson 71' (pen.)	BBC Sport	Hendry 6'	Stadium: Pittodrie Stadium; Attendance: 12,973; Referee: Gavin Duncan

19 February 2022 27	St Johnstone	2–1	Heart of Midlothian	Perth
15:00 GMT	Crawford 1'; McCart 56'	BBC Sport	Atkinson 6'	Stadium: McDiarmid Park; Attendance: 4,409; Referee: Grant Irvine

26 February 2022 28	Ross County	3–1	St Johnstone	Dingwall
15:00 GMT	Charles-Cook 35', 53'; Hungbo 66'	BBC Sport	Hendry 24'	Stadium: Victoria Park; Referee: Nick Walsh

2 March 2022 29	St Johnstone	0–1	Rangers	Perth
19:45 GMT		BBC Sport	Kamara 3'	Stadium: McDiarmid Park; Attendance: 6,869; Referee: William Collum

5 March 2022 30	Hibernian	0–0	St Johnstone	Edinburgh
15:00 GMT		BBC Sport		Stadium: Easter Road; Attendance: 19,585; Referee: Craig Napier

19 March 2022 31	St Johnstone	2–1	Motherwell	Perth
15:00 GMT	Hendry 21', 90+1'	BBC Sport	van Veen 12'	Stadium: McDiarmid Park; Attendance: 3,772; Referee: David Munro

2 April 2022 32	St Johnstone	1–0	Livingston	Perth
15:00 GMT	Hendry 3' (pen.)	BBC Sport		Stadium: McDiarmid Park; Attendance: 3,321; Referee: Kevin Clancy

9 April 2022 33	Celtic	7–0	St Johnstone	Glasgow
15:00 GMT	Hatate 8'; Giakoumakis 22'; Maeda 36'; Juranovic 51' (pen.); O'Riley 70', 73'; Abada 78'	BBC Sport		Stadium: Celtic Park; Referee: Andrew Dallas

23 April 2022 34	Dundee	1–1	St Johnstone	Dundee
15:00 GMT	Marshall 10'	BBC Sport	Rooney 68'	Stadium: Dens Park; Attendance: 7,937; Referee: Bobby Madden

30 April 2022 35	St Johnstone	0–1	St Mirren	Perth
15:00 GMT		BBC Sport	Kiltie 53'	Stadium: McDiarmid Park; Attendance: 4,253; Referee: Andrew Dallas

7 May 2022 36	Livingston	1–1	St Johnstone	Livingston
15:00 GMT	Fitzwater 90'	BBC Sport	Middleton 76'	Stadium: Tony Macaroni Arena; Referee: William Collum

11 May 2022 37	St Johnstone	1–0	Aberdeen	Perth
19:30 GMT	Hendry 17'	BBC Sport		Stadium: McDiarmid Park; Attendance: 3,421; Referee: David Munro

15 May 2022 38	Hibernian	4–0	St Johnstone	Edinburgh
12:00 GMT	McGinn 44'; Scott 48', 61', 88'	BBC Sport		Stadium: Easter Road; Attendance: 14,233; Referee: David Dickinson

=== Premiership play-off ===
20 May 2022 Final 1st Leg	Inverness CT	2–2	St Johnstone	Inverness
19:45 GMT	McAlear 73', 80'	BBC Sport	Rooney 18'; Hallberg 24'	Stadium: Caledonian Stadium; Attendance: 4,811; Referee: Bobby Madden

23 May 2022 Final 2nd Leg	St Johnstone	4–0 (6 – 2 agg.)	Inverness CT	Perth
19:45 GMT	May 46'; MacPherson 53'; Hendry 87'; Rooney 90'	BBC Sport		Stadium: McDiarmid Park; Attendance: 7,355; Referee: Nick Walsh

=== Scottish League Cup ===
15 August 2021 Second round	Arbroath	2–2 (a.e.t.) (2–3 p)	St Johnstone	Arbroath
14:00	Nouble 31'; O'Brien 93'	BBC Sport	Middleton 59'; McCart 105'	Stadium: Gayfield Park; Attendance: 1,842; Referee: Colin Steven
	Penalties
	Little (penalty missed); Henderson (penalty scored); Hilson (penalty missed); Low (penalty scored); Linn (penalty missed)		(penalty scored) Craig; (penalty scored) Hendry; (penalty missed) Booth; (penalty missed) Kerr; (penalty scored) McCann

22 September 2021 Quarter-finals	Dundee	0–2	St Johnstone	Dundee
19:45		BBC Sport	Rooney 70'; Crawford 84'	Stadium: Dens Park; Attendance: 4,707; Referee: Steven McLean

20 November 2021 Semi-finals	Celtic	1–0	St Johnstone	Glasgow
17:15	Forrest 73'	BBC Sport		Stadium: Hampden Park; Attendance: 42,298; Referee: Nick Walsh

=== Scottish Cup ===
22 January 2022 Fourth round	Kelty Hearts	1–0 (a.e.t.)	St Johnstone	Kelty
15:00 GMT	Higginbotham 103'	BBC Sport		Stadium: New Central Park; Attendance: 2,183; Referee: Kevin Clancy

=== UEFA Europa League ===
==== Third qualifying round ====
5 August 2021 First leg	Galatasaray (Turkey)	1–1	(Scotland) St Johnstone	Basaksehir Fatih Terim Stadium, Istanbul
20:00 (21:00 TRT)	Boey 60'	Report	Kerr 58' (pen.)	Attendance: 6,216; Referee: Sandro Schärer (Switzerland)

12 August 2021 Second leg	St Johnstone (Scotland)	2–4 (3–5 agg.)	(Turkey) Galatasaray	McDiarmid Park, Perth
20:45 (19:45 BST)	Kerr 36'; O'Halloran 90+3'	Report	Diagne 29'; Aktürkoglu 64'; Feghouli 70'; Kilinç 90+2'	Attendance: 9,106; Referee: Andris Treimanis (Latvia)

=== UEFA Europa Conference League ===
==== Play-off round ====
19 August 2021 First leg	LASK (Austria)	1–1	(Scotland) St Johnstone	Wörthersee Stadion, Klagenfurt
21:00	Karamoko 60' (pen.)	Report	Kane 17'	Attendance: 550; Referee: Glenn Nyberg (Sweden)

26 August 2021 Second leg	St Johnstone (Scotland)	0–2 (1–3 agg.)	(Austria) LASK	McDiarmid Park, Perth
20:45 (19:45 BST)		Report	Balic 72'; Raguž 85' (pen.)	Attendance: 8,845; Referee: Daniel Siebert (Germany)

== Squad statistics ==
=== Appearances ===
As of 23 May 2022

No.	Pos	Nat	Player	Total		Premiership		Scottish Cup		League Cup		Europa League		Conference League	
No.	Pos	Nat	Player	Apps	Goals	Apps	Goals	Apps	Goals	Apps	Goals	Apps	Goals	Apps	Goals
1	GK	(Scotland) SCO	Zander Clark	42	0	34	0	1	0	2+1	0	2	0	2	0
2	DF	(Malta) MLT	James Brown	30	0	18+6	0	1	0	2	0	1+1	0	1	0
3	DF	(Scotland) SCO	Tony Gallacher	10	0	7+2	0	1	0	0	0	0+0	0	0+0	0
4	DF	(Scotland) SCO	Jamie McCart	46	2	38	1	1	0	3	1	2	0	2	0
5	DF	(Republic of Ireland) IRL	Dan Cleary	18	0	17+0	0	1	0	0+0	0	0	0	0	0
6	DF	(Scotland) SCO	Liam Gordon	38	0	32+1	0	1	0	1	0	2	0	1	0
7	FW	(Scotland) SCO	Stevie May	40	3	13+20	3	0+1	0	1+1	0	0+2	0	0+2	0
8	MF	(Scotland) SCO	Murray Davidson	30	0	20+4	0	0	0	1+1	0	2	0	2	0
9	FW	(Scotland) SCO	Chris Kane	24	4	12+5	3	1	0	2	0	2	0	2	1
10	MF	(Canada) CAN	David Wotherspoon	14	0	9+1	0	0	0	2	0	1	0	0+1	0
11	FW	(Scotland) SCO	Michael O'Halloran	28	2	13+7	1	0+1	0	1+2	0	2	1	2	0
12	GK	(England) ENG	Elliot Parish	8	0	6+1	0	0	0	1	0	0	0	0	0
13	MF	(Scotland) SCO	Craig Bryson	10	0	8+1	0	0	0	1	0	0	0	0	0
14	FW	(Scotland) SCO	Glenn Middleton	35	2	18+12	1	0+1	0	2	1	0	0	2	0
15	MF	(Scotland) SCO	Charlie Gilmour	9	0	1+5	0	1	0	0+1	0	0	0	0+1	0
16	DF	(Republic of Ireland) IRL	John Mahon	4	0	2+2	0	0	0	0+0	0	0	0	0	0
17	FW	(Canada) CAN	Theo Bair	7	0	0+7	0	0	0	0+0	0	0	0	0	0
18	MF	(Scotland) SCO	Cammy MacPherson	22	1	13+8	1	0	0	1	0	0	0	0	0
19	DF	(Scotland) SCO	Shaun Rooney	32	4	24+1	3	0	0	3	1	1+1	0	2	0
20	GK	(Scotland) SCO	Ross Sinclair	0	0	0	0	0	0	0	0	0	0	0	0
21	MF	(Scotland) SCO	Ali Crawford	32	3	24+4	2	1	0	2+1	1	0	0	0	0
22	FW	(Scotland) SCO	Callum Hendry	26	9	20+1	9	0	0	1+1	0	0+2	0	0+1	0
23	FW	(Turkey) TUR	Nadir Çiftçi	12	0	8+3	0	1	0	0	0	0	0	0	0
24	DF	(Scotland) SCO	Callum Booth	34	0	26+1	0	0	0	2+1	0	1+1	0	2	0
26	MF	(Scotland) SCO	Liam Craig	22	0	9+7	0	0+1	0	2+1	0	1	0	0+1	0
27	DF	(England) ENG	Tom Sang	9	0	7+2	0	0	0	0	0	0	0	0	0
29	MF	(Sweden) SWE	Melker Hallberg	16	1	16	1	0	0	0	0	0	0	0	0
33	FW	(England) ENG	Jahmal Hector-Ingram	0	0	0	0	0	0	0	0	0	0	0	0
34	MF	(England) ENG	Jacob Butterfield	18	2	11+7	1	0	1	0	0	0	0	0+0	0
Departures
3	DF	(England) ENG	Reece Devine	10	0	4+2	0	0	0	1	0	1+1	0	0+1	0
5	DF	(Scotland) SCO	Jason Kerr	10	2	4	0	0	0	2	0	2	2	2	0
5	DF	(Belgium) BEL	Lars Dendoncker	6	0	4+1	0	0	0	0+1	0	0	0	0	0
16	DF	(England) ENG	Hayden Muller	8	0	7+1	0	0	0	0	0	0	0	0	0
17	FW	(Finland) FIN	Eetu Vertainen	8	0	3+4	0	0	0	0+1	0	0	0	0	0
18	MF	(Northern Ireland) NIR	Ali McCann	10	0	4+1	0	0	0	1	0	2	0	2	0
23	MF	(Scotland) SCO	Cammy Ballantyne	1	0	0	0	0	0	0+1	0	0	0	0	0
25	DF	(Nigeria) NGR	Efe Ambrose	8	0	5+2	0	0	0	1	0	0	0	0	0
27	MF	(Nigeria) NGR	Viv Solomon-Otabor	7	0	2+5	0	0	0	0	0	0	0	0+0	0

== Team statistics ==
=== League table ===
Pos	Team	Pld	W	D	L	GF	GA	GD	Pts	Qualification or relegation (Note: Teams play each other three times (33 matches), before the league is split into two groups (the top six and the bottom six).)
8	Hibernian	38	11	12	15	38	42	−4	45	
9	St Mirren	38	10	14	14	33	51	−18	44	
10	Aberdeen	38	10	11	17	41	46	−5	41	
11	St Johnstone (O)	38	8	11	19	24	51	−27	35	Qualification for the Premiership play-off final
12	Dundee (R)	38	6	11	21	34	64	−30	29	Relegation to Championship

Rules for classification: 1) Points; 2) Goal difference; 3) Goals scored; 4) Head-to-head points; 5) Head-to-Head goal difference; 6) Play-off (only if deciding champion, UEFA competitions qualification, second stage group allocation or relegation).
(O) Play-off winners; (R) Relegated

=== Overall record ===
Competition	First match	Last match	Starting round	Final position	Record							
Competition	First match	Last match	Starting round	Final position	Pld	W	D	L	GF	GA	GD	Win %
Premiership	31 July 2021	15 May 2022	Matchday 1	11th	38	8	11	19	24	51	−27	21.05
League Cup	15 August 2021	20 November 2021	Second round	Semi-finals	3	1	1	1	4	1	+3	33.33
Scottish Cup	22 January 2022	22 January 2022	Fourth round	Fourth round	1	0	0	1	0	1	−1	0.00
UEFA Europa League	5 August 2021	12 August 2021	Third qualifying round	Third qualifying round	2	0	1	1	3	5	−2	0.00
UEFA Europa Conference League	19 August 2021	26 August 2021	Play-off round	Play-off round	2	0	1	1	1	3	−2	0.00
Total					46	9	14	23	32	61	−29	19.57

Last updated: 15 May 2022
Source: Soccerway

== Transfers ==
=== In ===
Date	Player	Transferred from	Fee	Source
30 June 2021	(England) Hayden Muller	(England) Millwall	Loan	
1 July 2021	(Malta) James Brown	(England) Millwall	Free	
2 July 2021	(England) Reece Devine	(England) Manchester United	Loan	
6 August 2021	(Scotland) Glenn Middleton	(Scotland) Rangers	Loan	
31 August 2021	(Scotland) Ali Crawford	(England) Bolton Wanderers	Loan	
31 August 2021	(Belgium) Lars Dendoncker	(England) Brighton & Hove Albion	Loan	
31 August 2021	(Scotland) Cammy MacPherson	(Scotland) St Mirren	Loan	
1 September 2021	(Finland) Eetu Vertainen	(Finland) Ilves	Free	
10 September 2021	(Nigeria) Efe Ambrose	(Scotland) Livingston	Free	
24 November 2021	(Nigeria) Viv Solomon-Otabor	Unattached	Free	
13 December 2021	(England) Jacob Butterfield	Unattached	Free	
1 January 2022	(Republic of Ireland) Dan Cleary	(Republic of Ireland) Dundalk	Free	
3 January 2021	(Scotland) Ali Crawford	(England) Bolton Wanderers	Free	
4 January 2022	(Scotland) Tony Gallacher	(England) Liverpool	Free	
5 January 2022	(Turkey) Nadir Çiftçi	(Turkey) Ankaragücü	Free	
23 January 2022	(Republic of Ireland) John Mahon	(Republic of Ireland) Sligo Rovers	Undisclosed	
24 January 2022	(Scotland) Cammy MacPherson	(Scotland) St Mirren	Undisclosed	
24 January 2022	(Sweden) Melker Hallberg	(Scotland) Hibernian	Free	
31 January 2022	(Canada) Theo Bair	(Canada) Vancouver Whitecaps	Undisclosed	
31 January 2022	(England) Tom Sang	(Wales) Cardiff City	Loan	
1 February 2022	(England) Jahmal Hector-Ingram	(England) Derby County	Free	

=== Out ===
Date	Player	Transferred to	Fee	Source
1 June 2021	(Israel) Guy Melamed	Free agent	Free	
1 June 2021	(Scotland) Craig Conway	Free agent	Free	
1 June 2021	(Scotland) Olly Hamilton	Free agent	Free	
1 June 2021	(Scotland) Lennon Smith	Free agent	Free	
1 June 2021	(Scotland) Aiden Walsh	Free agent	Free	
1 June 2021	(Scotland) Aaron Steele	(Scotland) East Fife	Free	
7 June 2021	(England) Scott Tanser	(Scotland) St Mirren	Free	
22 June 2021	(Scotland) Alex Ferguson	(Scotland) Edinburgh City	Loan	
29 June 2021	(Scotland) Michael MacFarlane	(Scotland) Edinburgh City	Free	
30 July 2021	(Scotland) John Robertson	(Scotland) Edinburgh City	Free	
3 August 2021	(Scotland) Ben Finnan	(Scotland) Kelty Hearts	Free	
31 August 2021	(Northern Ireland) Ali McCann	(England) Preston North End	£1.2 Million	
31 August 2021	(Scotland) Jason Kerr	(England) Wigan Athletic	£600,000	
28 September 2021	(Scotland) Cammy Ballantyne	(Scotland) Montrose	Loan	
29 September 2021	(Scotland) Callum Hendry	(Scotland) Kilmarnock	Loan	
1 January 2022	(Scotland) Spencer Moreland	(Scotland) Stenhousemuir	Loan	
10 January 2022	(Nigeria) Viv Solomon-Otabor	(Ukraine) Rukh Lviv	Free	
4 February 2022	(Nigeria) Efe Ambrose	(Scotland) Dunfermline Athletic	Loan	
7 February 2022	(Finland) Eetu Vertainen	(Northern Ireland) Linfield	Loan	

== See also ==
- List of St Johnstone F.C. seasons
