= 2022–23 Manchester City F.C. season =

English football club season

Manchester City
2022–23 season
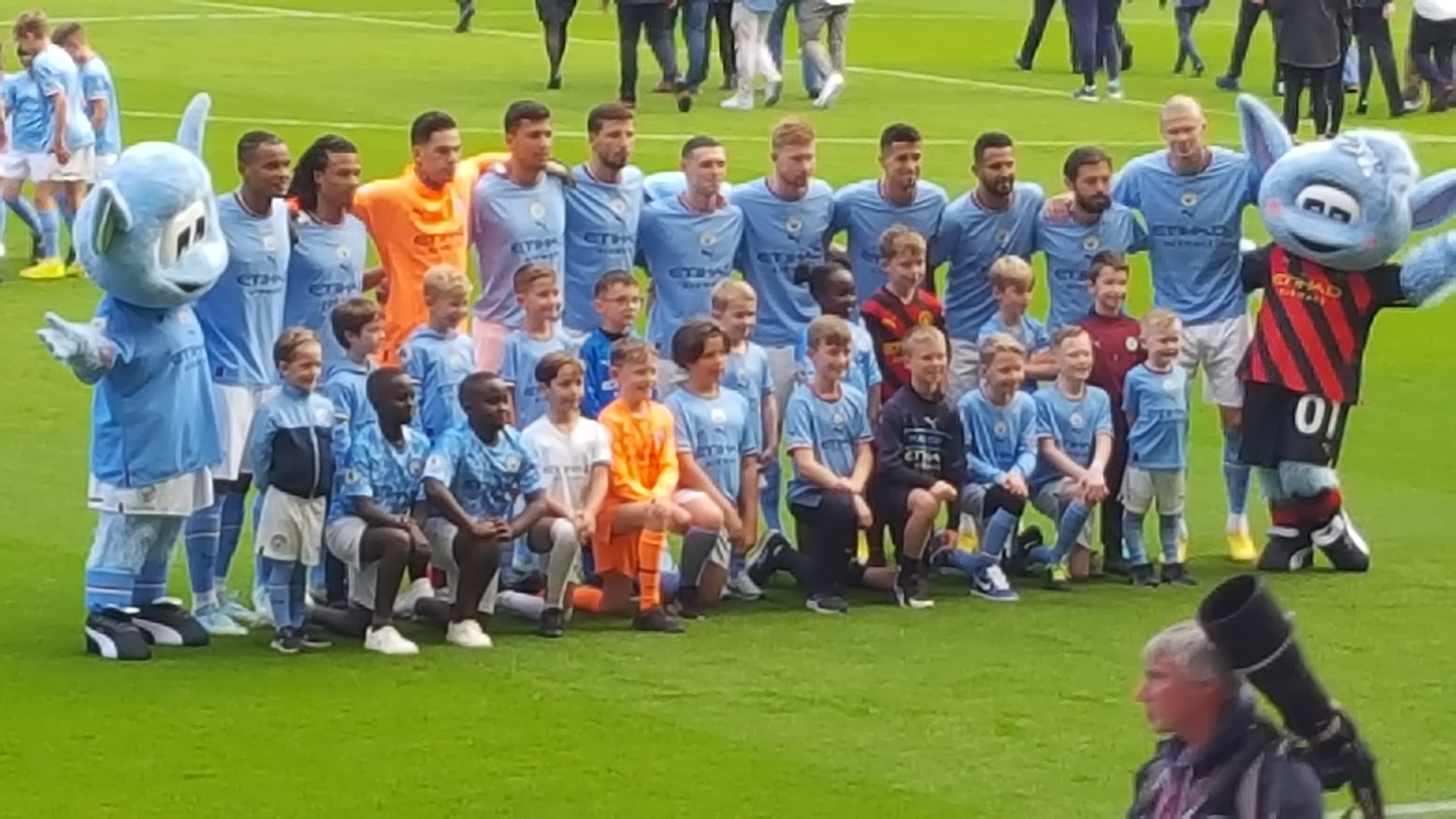
- Manchester City players lining up before their Premier League match against Southampton, 8 October 2022
- Owner: City Football Group
- Chairman: Khaldoon Al Mubarak
- Manager: Pep Guardiola
- Stadium: City of Manchester Stadium
- Premier League: 1st
- FA Cup: Winners
- EFL Cup: Quarter-finals
- FA Community Shield: Runners-up
- UEFA Champions League: Winners
- Top goalscorer: League: Erling Haaland (36); All: Erling Haaland (52)
- Highest home attendance: 53,490 v Chelsea, Premier League, 21 May 2023
- Lowest home attendance: 47,149 v Liverpool, EFL Cup, 22 December 2022
- Average home league attendance: 53,249
- Biggest win: 7–0 v RB Leipzig (H), Champions League, 14 March 2023
- Biggest defeat: 1–3 v Liverpool (N), Community Shield, 30 July 2022; 0–2 v Southampton (A), EFL Cup, 11 January 2023
Home colours	Away colours	Third colours

The 2022–23 season was the 128th season in the existence of Manchester City Football Club and their 21st consecutive season in the top flight of English football, where they were competing as two-time defending champions. In addition to the Premier League, Manchester City also participated in this season's editions of the FA Cup, EFL Cup, Community Shield and UEFA Champions League, entering the latter for the 12th consecutive season. The season was unusual in that the fixture dates of domestic and European competitions were altered to accommodate the FIFA World Cup played in November and December 2022 in Qatar.

Manchester City kicked off the season by losing the Community Shield to Liverpool 1–3 and were knocked out of the EFL Cup by Southampton at the quarter-final stage in January 2023. On 20 May, City mathematically clinched their third consecutive Premier League title following an exciting title race with closest rivals Arsenal, who had been leading the standings for the large part of the season. On 3 June, City defeated rivals Manchester United 2–1 in the FA Cup final to win their second trophy of the season. Furthermore, the Blues had advanced to their second Champions League final in three years, where they defeated Inter Milan on 10 June in Istanbul to clinch the club's first-ever European Cup, their first European trophy since 1970, and complete only the second continental treble by an English men's team, after Manchester United in 1998–99. Manchester City ended the season topping the UEFA coefficient rankings.

One of this season's individual highlights were the goalscoring feats of City's new striker Erling Haaland in his debut season in English football. He broke several club, league, and European records after scoring 52 goals in his first 53 games at City, going on to win multiple individual awards, including the European Golden Shoe.

This was the first season since 2012–13 without former team captain Fernandinho, who left at the end of the previous season to return to Brazil, and the first since 2014–15 not to feature English forward Raheem Sterling, who moved to Chelsea in the summer of 2022.

== Kits ==
Supplier: Puma / Sponsor: Etihad Airways (Front) / Nexen Tire (Sleeves)

Home	Home alt. (Note: Used in the away game against Sevilla on matchday 1 of the Champions League.)	Away	Third	Home 2023–24 (Note: Used in the away game against Brentford on matchday 38 of the Premier League.)
Goalkeeper 1	Goalkeeper 2	Goalkeeper 3

== Season summary ==
=== Pre-season ===
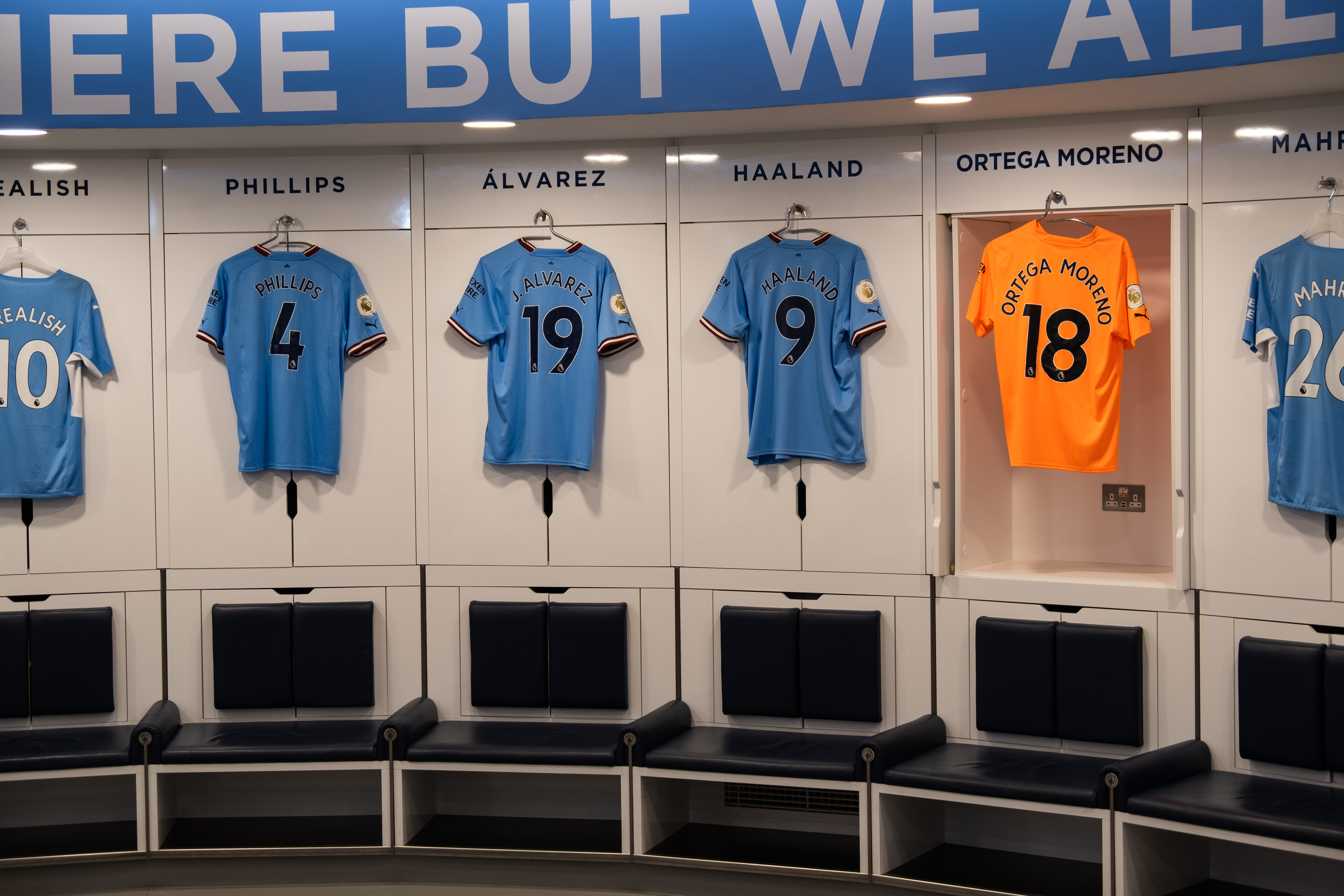
2022–23 shirts of City's new players hang alongside 2021–22 shirts of others before presentation

Manchester City had already resolved their most pressing squad issue before the end of the previous season, having announced their agreement to recruit a prolific centre-forward in Erling Haaland from Borussia Dortmund. This transfer was confirmed on 13 June 2022, with Haaland formally joining the first team on 1 July. Julián Álvarez would also join from River Plate, having been transferred in January 2022 and then temporarily loaned back.

City were expected to purchase a defensive midfielder to replace former captain Fernandinho. Kalvin Phillips was duly signed from Leeds United for a reported fee of £42 million plus add-ons on 4 July, and took the number 4 shirt previously worn by Vincent Kompany. City were also reported to be in the market for a new specialist left-back, with rumours that Marc Cucurella of Brighton was their number one target.

City's first player sales of the season were the transfer out of Pedro Porro to Sporting CP through a loan-to-buy deal for £7.2 million, and of Gavin Bazunu to Southampton for £12 million initially, up to £15 million after add-ons. Neither player had made a first-team appearance for City.

City began pre-season with several key first-team players entering the final years of their contract amidst rumours that they might leave the club for a fee rather than renew. Of these, it seemed the most speculation concerned Gabriel Jesus and his possible transfer to Arsenal, Tottenham Hotspur or Real Madrid after five years at City, and Raheem Sterling, who was also rumoured to be a Real Madrid target. Both players would, in theory, compete with the incoming Haaland and Álvarez for playing time if they remained. Jesus left City for Arsenal for a reported fee of £45 million on 4 July. Sterling went on to join Chelsea on 13 July for a fee reported to be about £47.5 million, with £2.5 million of add-ons. He had won eleven domestic titles in seven seasons at Manchester City, scoring 131 goals in 339 appearances, and was the club's 11th-highest scorer of all time.

Another significant transfer was the move of versatile Ukrainian left-back/midfielder Oleksandr Zinchenko to Arsenal for a fee of around £30 million after six seasons at City on 22 July. This left Pep Guardiola with just two senior specialist full-backs in his squad at the start of the new season, both of whom were natural right-backs, meaning City did not have a first team left-back. The club had refused to offer the minimum £50 million fee demanded by Brighton for Cucurella and he was eventually transferred to Chelsea on 5 August for a reported fee in excess of £60 million.

Manchester City opted to start pre-season training a week later than most of their rivals, and scheduled only two friendly warm-up games as part of their tour of the United States, in order to ensure their players would have sufficient rest. They would also begin the new season with a relatively small squad of just twenty senior players. Both of these were considered to be strong preferences by Guardiola.

=== Start of season ===
City won both their pre-season tour games in the United States. However, they tasted defeat in their first competitive match of the season, losing 1–3 to a more-prepared Liverpool side in the Community Shield held at Leicester City's King Power Stadium. Debutant Julián Álvarez scored the sole goal for the Blues.

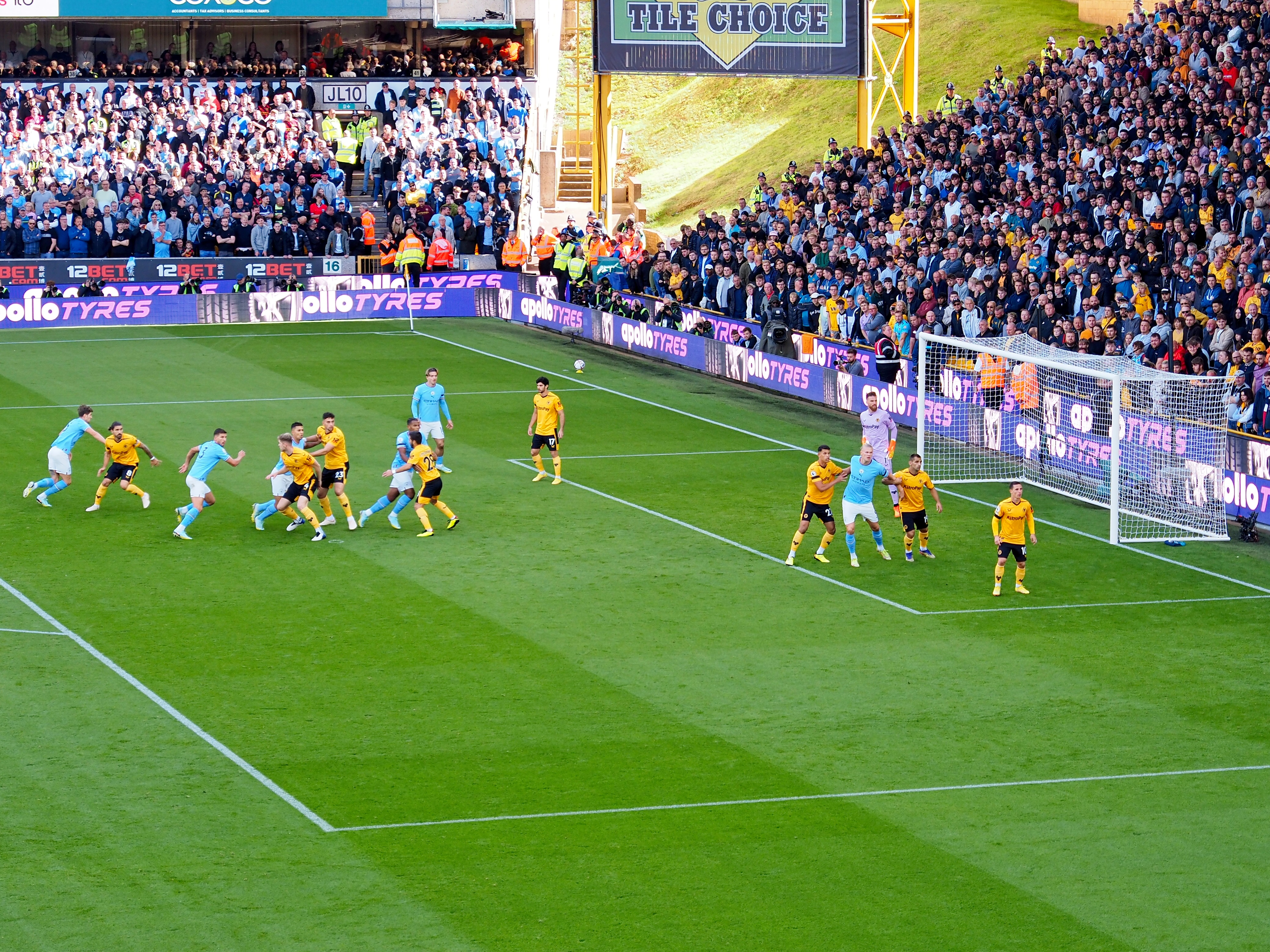
Manchester City players in an away Premier League match against Wolves in September 2022

In their first league game on 7 August, City beat West Ham United 2–0 away, with Haaland recording his first two competitive goals for the club; he became the first City player to score a brace on their league debut since Sergio Agüero did so against Swansea City in 2011. The following weekend, City announced that İlkay Gündoğan had been appointed club captain, with Rodri and Kyle Walker joining the vice-captain leadership group, shortly after City won their first league game at home 4–0 against Bournemouth.

City finally recruited a specialist left-back on 16 August, signing Spanish under-21 defender Sergio Gómez for £11 million plus add-ons from Anderlecht, where he had previously played under the management of former City defender and captain Vincent Kompany.

On 21 August, City played Newcastle United in an even match at St James' Park, and fought out another two-goal comeback to snatch a 3–3 draw. With seven points after three games, City were second in the league standings, two points behind Arsenal.

On 27 August, City fell behind by two goals for the fourth time in six league matches, this time against Crystal Palace at home, only to recover to a 4–2 victory in a second half comeback, with Erling Haaland scoring his first home goals and first hat-trick for the club.

On 31 August, Haaland became the first City player in the Premier League era to score a hat-trick in consecutive league games, scoring a "perfect" one in a 6–0 home rout of newly promoted Nottingham Forest. He had scored nine goals in his first five league games, another Premier League record.

City were estimated to have earnt a Premier League record of about £180 million from transfer sales during the single summer 2022 window, thus demonstrating the success of the team's academy programme (sales included several youth players sold for seven- or eight-figure fees), and the increasing market value for footballers (such as Zinchenko and Jesus) gained from playing under Guardiola and his coaching team for several seasons. City's overall net-spend in both 2022 transfer windows was estimated to be around £100 million or more.

In their opening UEFA Champions League group game, Manchester City thrashed Sevilla 4–0 in Spain, with a Haaland brace that brought his tally up to twelve goals in eight games for City and 25 goals in just twenty total Champions League appearances. This was Sevilla's largest ever defeat at home in the Champions League and their first defeat in an opening fixture since their debut season; this was also the sixth time in seven seasons that City had won their opening fixture in the competition.

City's home league fixture against Tottenham Hotspur, which originally was due to be played on 10 September, was postponed a day beforehand along with the entire weekend's English football league programme as a mark of respect following the death of Queen Elizabeth II. The following week, the away league fixture against Arsenal, due to be played on 19 October, was also postponed indirectly due to events following the Queen's death.

By late September, and the first international break of the season, City were second in the league, one point behind Arsenal and ahead of Spurs on goal difference, with a record of five wins and two draws. By that point, Haaland had already scored fourteen goals in ten games across all competitions and become the first player in Premier League history to score in all of his first four away fixtures. City had also extended their unbeaten away run in the league to 22 games and well over a year since their last defeat.

=== Autumn period ===
On 2 October, City beat Manchester United 6–3 in the first Manchester derby of the season at the City of Manchester Stadium, making it the highest scoring derby match of all time. Both Haaland and Phil Foden scored the first City derby hat-tricks in 52 years and only the third and fourth of all time. Haaland also became the first Premier League player to score a hat-trick in three consecutive home games, and City became the first team since Tottenham in 1965 to win eight consecutive league home games while scoring three goals or more. With his performance, the Norwegian pushed his output to seventeen goals in eleven appearances, as well as fourteen Premier League goals in eight appearances.

A 4–0 home league victory against Southampton the following week included another goal from Haaland and meant he had now scored in ten consecutive fixtures overall and seven in the Premier League. The latter record matched a feat accomplished only once before by a City player in the Premier League, namely Sergio Agüero in 2019. Haaland also reached the milestone of twenty goals for the season after playing only thirteen matches, another league record. Moreover, City matched the previous all-time English record set by Wolves in 1959 of nine consecutive home league wins while scoring three or more goals. In the league standings, the Blues maintained their second place with 23 points, just one behind surprise leaders Arsenal and already three ahead of third-placed Spurs.

City qualified for the last 16 of the Champions League for the tenth consecutive season on 11 October. Although they could only draw 0–0 away to Copenhagen that night, a 1–1 draw between Borussia Dortmund and Sevilla ensured their progression. City's match included three first-half VAR decisions: a 25-yard Rodri strike ruled out because of a Riyad Mahrez handball in the build-up, a penalty awarded to City, also for handball, taken by Mahrez and saved, and a red card shown to City's left back Sergio Gómez for a professional foul, which left the Blues playing with ten men for over an hour.

City suffered their first league defeat in a hard-fought match against Liverpool at Anfield on 16 October. Mohamed Salah scored the only goal off of a second-half breakaway, after Foden had seen his effort earlier in the contest ruled out by VAR for a foul on Fabinho by Haaland in the build-up.

A second consecutive 0–0 Champions League away draw, to Dortmund on 25 October, was sufficient to ensure City would qualify for the last 16 as group winners with one game to spare, although Mahrez again missed a penalty. On 2 November, Rico Lewis scored his first senior goal in a 3–1 win against Sevilla; he became the all-time youngest scorer on a first start in a Champions League match and City's youngest ever Champions League scorer, aged 17 years and 346 days. Three days later, City beat Fulham 2–1 in the league at the City of Manchester Stadium, having played for over an hour with ten men after João Cancelo had been sent off when adjudged to have deliberately denied Harry Wilson a goal-scoring opportunity with a shoulder charge. City's winner was scored in the fifth minute of injury time by Haaland, netting a penalty after De Bruyne had been fouled. This led to ecstatic scenes afterwards with Guardiola encouraging his players to thank the crowd with a lap of honour.

The Blues lost their final game before the mid-season break for the World Cup on 12 November, having been beaten 1–2 at home to Brentford with a brace, including a 98th-minute winner, from Ivan Toney. City therefore ended the first part of the season in second place in the league, five points behind Arsenal and two points ahead of Newcastle, but with a game in hand; the Blues also advanced in the Champions League with an unbeaten record and reached the fourth round of the EFL Cup.

Sixteen of City's players were called up in squads to play in the World Cup finals, second only to Barcelona (seventeen) in world football, and the most in the club's history. This left just eight players remaining at home until the season resumed the week before Christmas with a home EFL Cup tie against Liverpool. Just two of City's World Cup participants played for teams eliminated after the group stage of the competition; the other fourteen would remain for the knockout phase. However, only Julián Álvarez reached the final week of the competition in the Argentina squad, while the others were eliminated either in the round of 16 or quarter-finals. Álvarez went on to become the fifth player to participate on the pitch in a World Cup final while playing at City (after Nigel de Jong in 2010, and Sergio Agüero, Pablo Zabaleta and Martin Demichelis in 2014), and only the second to become a World Cup winner as a City player.

The club announced on 23 November that Pep Guardiola had signed a new contract to remain as manager for an additional two years until summer 2025.

=== Christmas and New Year ===
All but two of City's first team players had been able to return to training by the time of the first competitive fixture after the resumption of the season. Ederson had been delayed by flight problems returning from Brazil, and Álvarez was permitted an extended break to enjoy the victory celebrations in Argentina. In their first match back on 22 December, City beat Liverpool for the first time in two seasons with a 3–2 win in the fourth round of the EFL Cup, thus knocking out the current holders and qualifying for the quarter-finals.

Another brace from Haaland in City's 3–1 away victory over Leeds in their first league game after the World Cup moved him to twenty league goals for the season, as he became the fastest player since the formation of the Premier League to reach this milestone (after only fourteen appearances).

City suffered from inconsistent form in early January 2023. They were knocked out of the EFL Cup by Southampton in a 2–0 defeat at St Mary's Stadium, and dropped league points against Everton and Manchester United to allow Arsenal to open up an eight-point gap at the top of the table. The latter derby defeat included a controversial equalising goal for their rivals, which many observers deemed should have been ruled out for offside. However, the Blues also convincingly beat Chelsea 4–0 in the FA Cup to reach the fourth round.

Haaland scored his fourth hat-trick of the season in City's 3–0 victory over Wolves on 22 January. This set a new club record for the most hat-tricks scored in a single season and a new national record for the fewest games to achieve the milestone. It also moved Haaland to 31 goals in all competitions for the season, only seven behind City's all-time record, as he became only the thirteenth player in the club's history to score more than thirty.

On winter transfer deadline day, João Cancelo moved on loan to Bayern Munich for the remainder of the season with an option for a later permanent transfer, amid rumours he had fallen out with Pep Guardiola. Until then Cancelo had played the most minutes of any of the squad's defenders but had found game time more limited since the World Cup with the emergence of teenage academy graduate Rico Lewis and the form of Nathan Aké.

On 6 February, the Premier League announced that, after a four-year investigation, they were charging Manchester City with committing more than 100 breaches of financial rules, referring the club to an independent commission for breaches made between 2009 and 2018. City were also accused of not co-operating with the investigation. The punishments that the commission could impose ranged from fines to points deduction or even expulsion from the Premier League.

Despite this, City went back to top of the league on 15 February when they beat Arsenal 3–1 at the Emirates Stadium to move ahead of them on goal difference, although their opponents that day still had a game in hand. However, this lead was brief as City's inconsistency and wasteful finishing again cost them two points in their following match away at Nottingham Forest, as the Blues were held to a 1–1 draw with a late equaliser by Chris Wood for the hosts; Arsenal won their game in hand to again stretch their lead to five points by early March.

Haaland scored his 27th goal of the league season against Bournemouth on 25 February, breaking the club record that Sergio Agüero set in 2014–15 for most Premier League goals in a season.

On 28 February, City defeated Bristol City away from home 3–0, advancing to the FA Cup quarter-finals.

=== Season run-in ===
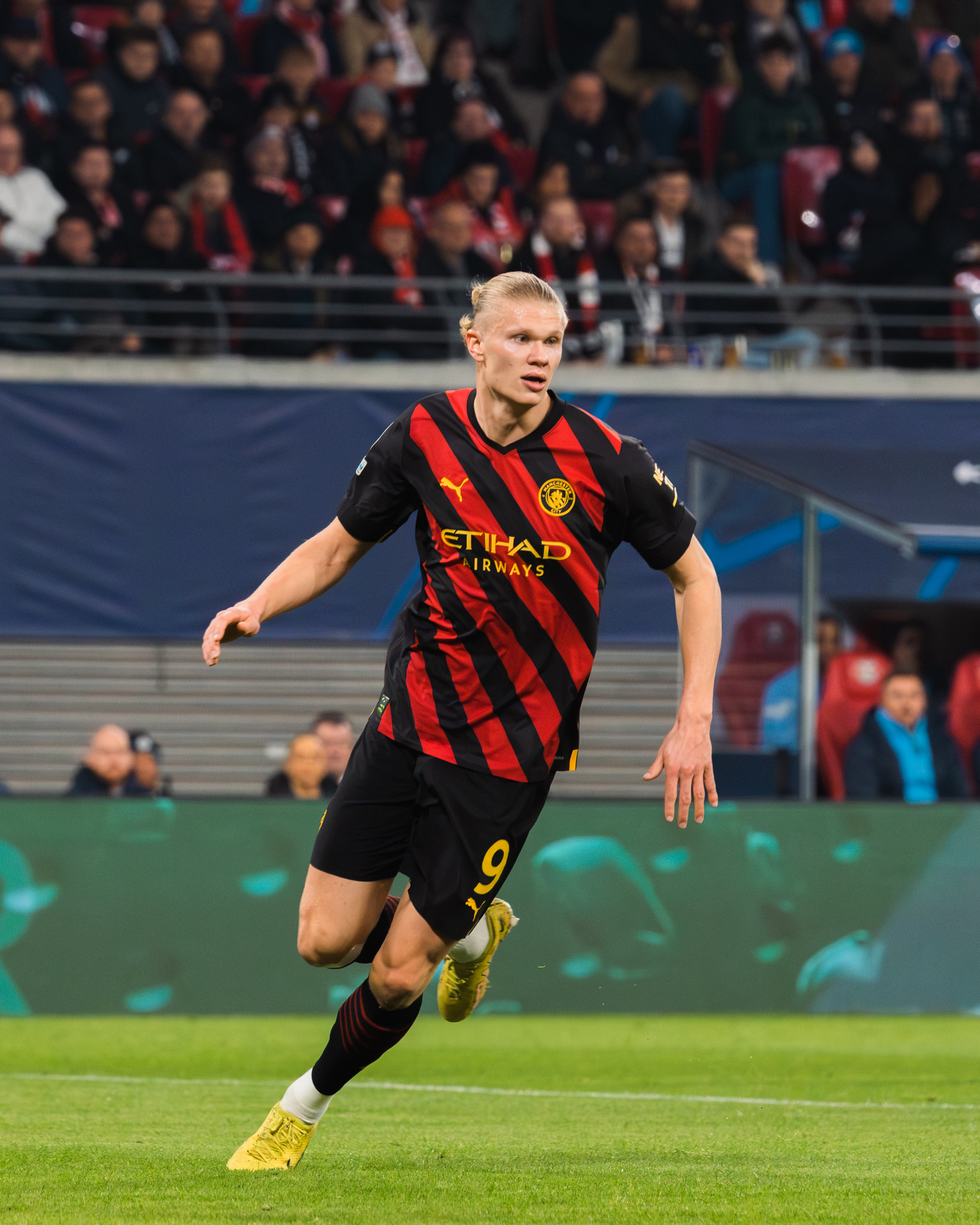
Erling Haaland in action against RB Leipzig in the Champions League round of 16

On 14 March, on a record breaking night, City defeated RB Leipzig 7–0 at home (8–1 on aggregate) in their Champions League round of 16 second leg tie to advance to the quarter-finals of the competition. This equalled City's record scoreline in the Champions League, but the match was particularly notable for the five goals scored by Haaland, who in recording his 39th goal of the season broke the 94-year-old club record of Tommy Johnson. It was also the first time a City player had scored five goals in a single continental match, and broke the record for the most number of continental goals scored in a season.

Prior to the final international break of the season, the Blues displayed an impressive offensive showing against Burnley, recording a 6–0 home win in the FA Cup quarter-finals with another Haaland hat-trick.

Following the resumption of domestic football, City convincingly beat Liverpool 4–1 at home on 1 April, despite going a goal behind and missing the injured Haaland and Foden from their matchday squad. However, Arsenal matched the result later that day by beating Leeds United. Thus, with just ten games remaining, City remained seven points behind the Gunners as league leaders, but still had a game in hand and a home fixture against their league rivals to help bolster their chances of retaining their title.

On 8 April, in a 4–1 away win against Southampton, Haaland brought his tally to thirty league goals with a brace, becoming only the fifth player to reach this milestone and the fastest ever to do so. De Bruyne also became the fastest player to reach 100 Premier League assists.

Arsenal dropped points the following day, drawing 2–2 away to Liverpool after they had led by two goals. This reduced the deficit to six points with City still having a game in hand, yet to play their rivals at home and with a superior goal difference.

On 11 April, Manchester City faced ten-time defending Bundesliga champions Bayern Munich at home in the first leg of their Champions League quarter-final, and earned a convincing 3–0 victory. Rodri, Bernardo Silva and Haaland each scored, and the Blues had multiple chances to further increase their advantage.

A dominant first-half performance against Leicester City in the next league game saw City run out as 3–1 winners. Another brace from Haaland brought his league goals tally to 32, equalling the record held by Mohamed Salah for goals in a 38-game Premier League season. The following day, Arsenal once again dropped points after holding a two-goal lead, drawing 2–2 at West Ham and thus decreasing their lead at the top of the table to only four points with an extra game played.

On 19 April, the Blues secured safe passage to the Champions League semi-finals for the third year in a row after a 1–1 draw with Bayern at the Allianz Arena. Haaland had sent a penalty over the crossbar at the end of the first half, but atoned by converting a one-on-one chance early into the second period. Late in the game, Bayern managed to equalise with a penalty from Joshua Kimmich. City would next face holders Real Madrid in a rematch of the previous year's semi-finals, where the Spanish giants had dramatically won 6–5 on aggregate after extra time en route to their 14th European crown.

Later that week, Arsenal hosted the league's bottom club Southampton and drew 3–3 unexpectedly, coming back from a two-goal deficit. Their lead in first place was now five points, having played two more matches, than City, and due to meet them at the City of Manchester Stadium in their next game in what was billed as a league decider.

On 22 April, Riyad Mahrez scored City's first ever Wembley hat-trick, and the first in a FA Cup semi-final since 1958, to beat Sheffield United 3–0 and reach the club's twelfth FA Cup final.

On 26 April, City convincingly beat Arsenal 4–1 at home, with a brace from De Bruyne and a goal and two assists from Haaland, with his goal breaking the Premier League scoring record for a 38-game season. This meant City moved to within two points of their opponents with two games in hand, leaving the destiny of the league title in City's hands with only seven games remaining.

=== End of season ===
On 3 May, Haaland became the sole record holder for the most Premier League goals scored in a single season, netting City's second goal in a 3–0 home victory against West Ham. The third goal, scored by Phil Foden, was also the 1,000th under Guardiola's reign as City manager, achieved in just 404 games.

Further victories away at Fulham and at home to Leeds United stretched City's winning streak in the league to ten games and ensured that they would likely require a maximum of eight points from their four remaining fixtures to retain the league title, thanks to a significantly better goal difference than their closest rivals.

On 9 May, the Blues secured a 1–1 draw at the Santiago Bernabéu Stadium in the first leg of their Champions League semi-final against Real Madrid, with Kevin De Bruyne netting a long-range equaliser and becoming the first player to score in separate Champions League away knockout games against Real Madrid, having previously done so against Los Blancos in the round of 16 of the 2019–20 edition. City had controlled much of the game and frustrated the title holders in many periods of the match. However, both goalkeepers had to make several saves to keep the scores level. The result stretched City's unbeaten run to 21 matches in all competitions over the past three months.

On 12 May, Haaland was named FWA Footballer of the Year, the season's first top level award.

City extended their unbeaten run to 22 games and their league winning streak to eleven as they defeated Everton 3–0 at Goodison Park on 14 May, with captain İlkay Gündoğan scoring a brace for the second league match in a row. This win, coupled with Arsenal's home defeat to Brighton later the same day, meant that City could become league champions if they were victorious against Chelsea at home in their next league game, or if Arsenal lost against Nottingham Forest in their next fixture the day before. The latter scenario subsequently materialised, as Arsenal lost 0–1 at Forest on 20 May, with Manchester City thus securing a third consecutive league title, and fifth in six years, with three games to spare.

On 17 May, in one of their best performances of the Guardiola era, City thrashed Real Madrid 4–0 at home in the second leg of the Champions League semi-finals for a convincing 5–1 aggregate victory. Bernardo Silva scored a first-half brace and Manuel Akanji and Julián Álvarez further extended their lead in the second half. Once again, the Blues had an abundance of chances to score more, but, similarly to last season, Madrid goalkeeper Thibaut Courtois's prolific performance kept his side in the game, this time until City's third goal. Manchester City therefore advanced to their second Champions League final in three years, having lost to Chelsea in the 2021 final; they would meet Inter Milan in Istanbul on 10 June 2023, attempting to clinch their first European Cup and first European trophy since 1970.

With the title already secured, City ended their league campaign with a home win, an away draw and an away defeat against Chelsea, Brighton and Brentford, respectively, as Guardiola rotated his squad to rest players ahead of their two upcoming finals. In the end of season awards, Haaland became the first player to win both the Premier League Player of the Season and Young Player of the Season awards, as well as the Golden Boot. De Bruyne won the Playmaker of the Season award, while Guardiola won both the Premier League Manager of the Season and LMA Manager of the Year awards.

==== The treble ====
On 3 June, City secured the league and FA Cup double for the second time in their history by beating city rivals Manchester United 2–1 in the first-ever Manchester derby cup final. İlkay Gündoğan scored both goals for the Blues, the first one after just 12 seconds, making it the fastest in FA Cup final history.

On 10 June, Manchester City faced Inter Milan in the Champions League final, aiming to end the 53-year European trophy drought and secure the continental treble, and the match was a tense and close affair. City began the final with Kyle Walker unexpectedly left on the bench in favour of Nathan Aké; Inter retained the same starting line-up that had played in previous rounds. The two sides had scoring chances early in the first half, but Inter's André Onana made two saves to prevent City from taking the lead. A misplayed pass from Ederson in the 26th minute was stolen by Nicolò Barella, but his shot over the goalkeeper missed. De Bruyne would leave the match in the 36th minute with a hamstring injury, and he was replaced by Phil Foden. The first half ended scoreless, with Inter playing more defensively to prevent City from gaining momentum.

Romelu Lukaku was brought on to replace former City striker Edin Džeko early in the second half and immediately produced a chance from a header. In the 59th minute, Ederson did not anticipate a backpass from Akanji which was found by Inter's Lautaro Martínez; his shot from near the touchline was blocked by Ederson. Rodri scored the opening goal for City in the 68th minute, finishing a pulled-back pass that Bernardo Silva sent from near the goal to the top of the penalty area. Inter had a chance to equalise three minutes later through a header by defender Federico Dimarco that hit the crossbar. Dimarco tried to capitalise on the rebound as well, but his shot was blocked by Lukaku. The Belgian striker had his own chance to score from a close-range header in the 89th minute, which Ederson blocked with his legs. The Brazilian made an additional save in stoppage time off of a Robin Gosens header to preserve a 1–0 victory for City.

Rodri, who scored the lone goal and was instrumental in City's midfield, was named man of the match by UEFA. For Manchester City, this was their first-ever European Cup, and first European trophy since 1970. Having earlier won the Premier league and FA Cup titles, they achieved a continental treble, becoming only the second English and eighth European men's club to have done so. As winners, City earned the right to play against Sevilla, the champions of the 2022–23 UEFA Europa League, in the UEFA Super Cup, as well as qualifying for both the 2023 and 2025 FIFA Club World Cups.

City's players and staff later received multiple prestigious awards in recognition of their achievements. Haaland was named the UEFA Men's Player of the Year, and Pep Guardiola won the UEFA Men's Coach of the Year award. Seven City players were included in the Champions League team of the season, with Rodri being named the most valuable player of the tournament.

== First-team squad ==
No.	Player	Nat.	Position(s)	Date of birth (age)	Signed	Signed from	Transfer fee	Contract until
Goalkeepers
18	Stefan Ortega	(Germany)	GK	6 November 1992 (aged 30)	2022	(Germany) Arminia Bielefeld	Free	2025
31	Ederson	(Brazil)	GK	17 August 1993 (aged 29)	2017	(Portugal) Benfica	£34.9m	2026
33	Scott Carson	(England)	GK	2 September 1985 (aged 37)	2021 (Note: Carson was on loan from Derby in 2019–2021, before joining Man City permanently in 2021.)	Derby County	Free	2023
Defenders
2	Kyle Walker (VC)	(England)	RB / CB	28 May 1990 (aged 33)	2017	Tottenham Hotspur	£45m	2024
3	Rúben Dias (VC)	(Portugal)	CB	14 May 1997 (aged 26)	2020	(Portugal) Benfica	£62m (Note: City player Nicolás Otamendi was included in the deal, bringing the transfer fee paid to £50m.)	2027
5	John Stones	(England)	CB / RB / DM	28 May 1994 (aged 29)	2016	Everton	£47.5m	2026
6	Nathan Aké	(Netherlands)	CB / LB	18 February 1995 (aged 28)	2020	Bournemouth	£40m	2025
14	Aymeric Laporte	(Spain)	CB / LB	27 May 1994 (aged 29)	2018†	(Spain) Athletic Bilbao	£57m	2025
21	Sergio Gómez	(Spain)	LB / AM	4 September 2000 (aged 22)	2022	(Belgium) Anderlecht	£11m	2026
25	Manuel Akanji	(Switzerland)	CB / RB / LB	19 July 1995 (aged 27)	2022	(Germany) Borussia Dortmund	£15m	2027
62^{#}	Shea Charles	(Northern Ireland)	DM / CB	5 November 2003 (aged 19)	2023	Manchester City Academy	Academy Player	2025
82	Rico Lewis	(England)	RB / DM	21 November 2004 (aged 18)	2022	Manchester City Academy	Academy Player	2025
Midfielders
4	Kalvin Phillips	(England)	DM / CM	5 December 1995 (aged 27)	2022	Leeds United	£42m	2028
8	İlkay Gündoğan (C)	(Germany)	CM / DM	14 October 1990 (aged 32)	2016	(Germany) Borussia Dortmund	£20m	2023
10	Jack Grealish	(England)	LW / AM	10 September 1995 (aged 27)	2021	Aston Villa	£100m (Note: Record transfer fee for an English player.)	2027
16	Rodri (VC)	(Spain)	DM	23 June 1996 (aged 27)	2019	(Spain) Atlético Madrid	£62.8m	2027
17	Kevin De Bruyne (VC)	(Belgium)	CM / AM	28 June 1991 (aged 32)	2015	(Germany) VfL Wolfsburg	£54.5m	2025
20	Bernardo Silva	(Portugal)	CM / AM / RW	10 August 1994 (aged 28)	2017	(France) Monaco	£43.5m	2025
32	Máximo Perrone	(Argentina)	DM / CM	5 January 2003 (aged 20)	2023†	(Argentina) Vélez Sarsfield	£8.2m	2028
47	Phil Foden	(England)	AM / CM / LW / RW / FW	28 May 2000 (aged 23)	2017	Manchester City Academy	Academy Player	2027
80	Cole Palmer	(England)	AM / RW / LW	6 May 2002 (aged 21)	2020	Manchester City Academy	Academy Player	2026
Forwards
9	Erling Haaland	(Norway)	ST	21 July 2000 (aged 22)	2022	(Germany) Borussia Dortmund	£51.2m	2027
19	Julián Álvarez	(Argentina)	ST / LW / RW	31 January 2000 (aged 23)	2022†	(Argentina) River Plate	£14.1m	2028
26	Riyad Mahrez	(Algeria)	RW	21 February 1991 (aged 32)	2018	Leicester City	£60m	2025

Includes first team players and EDS players who train routinely with the first team and have made at least one league appearance in the first team. Ages are stated as of the end of the 2022–23 season (10 June 2023).

Key

# – Current EDS squad player.
† – Signed in January window.
‡ – Initially signed to Academy team.

== Transfers ==
=== Transfers in ===
Date	Pos.	No.	Player	From	Fee	Team	Ref.
1 July 2022	FW	9	(Norway) Erling Haaland	(Germany) Borussia Dortmund	£51,200,000	First team	
1 July 2022	GK	18	(Germany) Stefan Ortega	(Germany) Arminia Bielefeld	Free transfer	First team	
4 July 2022	MF	4	(England) Kalvin Phillips	Leeds United	£42,000,000	First team	
1 August 2022	MF	99	(England) Terrell Agyemang	Charlton Athletic	Free transfer	Academy	
16 August 2022	DF	21	(Spain) Sergio Gómez	(Belgium) Anderlecht	£11,000,000	First team	
31 August 2022	FW	–	(Germany) Farid Alfa-Ruprecht	(Germany) Hamburger SV	Undisclosed	Academy	
1 September 2022	DF	25	(Switzerland) Manuel Akanji	(Germany) Borussia Dortmund	£15,000,000	First team	
23 January 2023	MF	32	(Argentina) Máximo Perrone	(Argentina) Vélez Sarsfield	£8,200,000	First team	
Total					£127,400,000		

=== Transfers out ===
Date	Pos.	No.	Player	To	Fee	Team	Ref.
17 June 2022	GK	55	(Republic of Ireland) Gavin Bazunu	Southampton	£12,000,000	Academy	
1 July 2022	FW	–	(Ghana) Thomas Agyepong	Unattached	End of contract	Academy	
1 July 2022	MF	–	(Ghana) Mohammed Aminu	(Greece) AEP Kozani	End of contract	Academy	
1 July 2022	FW	73	(Netherlands) Jayden Braaf	(Germany) Borussia Dortmund	End of contract	Academy	
1 July 2022	MF	25	(Brazil) Fernandinho	(Brazil) Athletico Paranaense	End of contract	First team	
1 July 2022	DF	95	(Ghana) Kwaku Oduroh	Derby County	End of contract	Academy	
1 July 2022	DF	–	(Peru) Kluiverth Aguilar	(Belgium) Lommel	Undisclosed	City Football Group	
1 July 2022	DF	–	(Spain) Pedro Porro	(Portugal) Sporting CP	£7,200,000	City Football Group	
1 July 2022	DF	56	(England) CJ Egan-Riley	Burnley	£350,000	Academy	
2 July 2022	DF	–	(Japan) Ko Itakura	(Germany) Borussia Mönchengladbach	£4,300,000	City Football Group	
4 July 2022	FW	9	(Brazil) Gabriel Jesus	Arsenal	£45,000,000	First team	
4 July 2022	FW	89	(England) Darko Gyabi	Leeds United	£5,000,000	Academy	
6 July 2022	MF	90	(Belgium) Roméo Lavia	Southampton	£10,500,000	Academy	
8 July 2022	FW	–	(Japan) Ryotaro Meshino	(Japan) Gamba Osaka	Undisclosed	City Football Group	
13 July 2022	LW	7	(England) Raheem Sterling	Chelsea	£47,500,000	First team	
22 July 2022	GK	49	(Kosovo) Arijanet Muric	Burnley	£2,500,000	First team	
22 July 2022	DF	11	(Ukraine) Oleksandr Zinchenko	Arsenal	£30,000,000	First team	
26 July 2022	MF	–	(Australia) Daniel Arzani	(Australia) Macarthur	Undisclosed	City Football Group	
31 July 2022	FW	41	(Spain) Pablo Moreno	(Portugal) Marítimo	Undisclosed	City Football Group	
1 August 2022	MF	68	(Spain) Oscar Tarensi	(Spain) Celta C-Gran Peña	Undisclosed	Academy	
11 August 2022	DF	–	(England) Testimony Igbinoghene	Wolverhampton Wanderers	Free transfer	Academy	
12 August 2022	MF	–	(England) Luca Barrington	Brighton & Hove Albion	Undisclosed	Academy	
31 August 2022	MF	–	(Croatia) Ante Palaversa	(France) Troyes	Undisclosed	City Football Group	
1 September 2022	FW	29	(Colombia) Marlos Moreno	(France) Troyes	Undisclosed	City Football Group	
1 September 2022	MF	81	(France) Claudio Gomes	(Italy) Palermo	Undisclosed	Academy	
1 September 2022	MF	53	(England) Samuel Edozie	Southampton	£10,000,000	Academy	
1 September 2022	DF	99	(Spain) Juan Larios	Southampton	£6,000,000	Academy	
6 September 2022	DF	57	(England) Yeboah Amankwah	(Belgium) Lommel	Undisclosed	Academy	
14 January 2023	DF	–	(Brazil) Diego Rosa	(Brazil) Bahia	Undisclosed	City Football Group	
1 February 2023	FW	54	(Scotland) Liam Smith	(Wales) Swansea City	Undisclosed	Academy	
7 February 2023	MF	66	(Spain) Iker Pozo	(Croatia) Šibenik	Undisclosed	Academy	
Total					£180,350,000		

=== Loans out ===
Date	Pos.	No.	Player	Loaned to	On loan until	Team	Ref.
15 June 2022	GK	85	(England) James Trafford	Bolton Wanderers	End of season	Academy	
1 July 2022	DF	12	(England) Taylor Harwood-Bellis	Burnley	End of season	Academy	
4 July 2022	MF	69	(England) Tommy Doyle	Sheffield United	End of season	Academy	
8 July 2022	MF	–	(Brazil) Diego Rosa	(Portugal) Vizela	14 January 2023 (Note: Rosa's loan was terminated prior to him being sold to Bahia. Manchester City had not announced the original length of the loan.)	City Football Group	
11 July 2022	DF	86	(England) Callum Doyle	Coventry City	End of season	Academy	
16 July 2022	MF	71	(Scotland) Lewis Fiorini	Blackpool	End of season	Academy	
19 July 2022	GK	13	(United States) Zack Steffen	Middlesbrough	End of season	First team	
22 July 2022	FW	–	(Argentina) Darío Sarmiento	(Uruguay) Montevideo City Torque	Unknown	City Football Group	
25 July 2022	DF	39	(Brazil) Yan Couto	(Spain) Girona	End of season	City Football Group	
29 July 2022	GK	84	(Scotland) Cieran Slicker	Rochdale	11 January 2023 (Note: On 11 January, Slicker was recalled from his season-long loan at Rochdale.)	Academy	
2 August 2022	DF	–	(Venezuela) Yangel Herrera	(Spain) Girona	End of season	City Football Group	
4 August 2022	MF	87	(England) James McAtee	Sheffield United	End of season	Academy	
4 August 2022	FW	–	(Serbia) Slobodan Tedić	Barnsley	End of season	City Football Group	
5 August 2022	FW	–	(Argentina) Nahuel Bustos	(Brazil) São Paulo	27 December 2022 (Note: On 27 December, Bustos was recalled from his loan at São Paulo, which had been scheduled to last until 30 June 2023, and was subsequently loaned to Talleres de Córdoba.)	City Football Group	
13 August 2022	FW	37	(Brazil) Kayky	(Portugal) Paços de Ferreira	10 December 2022 (Note: On 10 December, Kaky was recalled from his season-long loan at Paços de Ferreira and was subsequently loaned to Bahia.)	Academy	
13 August 2022	DF	–	(Venezuela) Nahuel Ferraresi	(Brazil) São Paulo	End of season (Note: Nahuel Ferraresi was initially loaned to São Paulo until 30 June 2023, with an extension option through 31 December 2023.)	City Football Group	
17 August 2022	DF	–	(Burkina Faso) Issa Kaboré	(France) Marseille	End of season	City Football Group	
18 August 2022	FW	48	(England) Liam Delap	Stoke City	12 January 2023 (Note: On 12 January, Delap was recalled from his season-long loan at Stoke and was subsequently loaned to Preston.)	Academy	
1 September 2022	DF	79	(England) Luke Mbete	Huddersfield Town	31 January 2023 (Note: On 31 January, Mbete was recalled from his season-long loan at Huddersfield and was subsequently loaned to Bolton.)	Academy	
3 September 2022	FW	–	(Serbia) Filip Stevanović	(Portugal) Santa Clara	End of season	City Football Group	
27 December 2022	FW	–	(Argentina) Nahuel Bustos	(Argentina) Talleres de Córdoba	End of 2023	City Football Group	
4 January 2023	FW	72	(England) Morgan Rogers	Blackpool	End of season	Academy	
10 January 2023	DF	97	(England) Josh Wilson-Esbrand	Coventry City	End of season	First team	
12 January 2023	FW	48	(England) Liam Delap	Preston North End	End of season	Academy	
13 January 2023	FW	37	(Brazil) Kayky	(Brazil) Bahia	End of 2023	Academy	
31 January 2023	DF	7	(Portugal) João Cancelo	(Germany) Bayern Munich	End of season	First team	
31 January 2023	DF	79	(England) Luke Mbete	Bolton Wanderers	End of season	Academy	

=== New contracts ===
Date	Pos.	No.	Player	Contract until	Team	Ref.
14 Jun 2022	GK	33	(England) Scott Carson	2023	First team	
24 June 2022	DF	79	(England) Luke Mbete	2027	Academy	
8 July 2022	MF	64	(England) Rowan McDonald	2023	Academy	
8 July 2022	GK	85	(England) James Trafford	2027	Academy	
12 July 2022	MF	16	(Spain) Rodri	2027	First team	
15 July 2022	FW	26	(Algeria) Riyad Mahrez	2025	First team	
14 October 2022	MF	47	(England) Phil Foden	2027	First team	
25 January 2023	DF	86	(England) Callum Doyle	2027	Academy	
16 March 2023	FW	19	(Argentina) Julián Álvarez	2028	First team	
26 May 2023	GK	33	(England) Scott Carson	2024	First team	

== Pre-season and friendlies ==
On 25 April, Manchester City announced they would travel to the United States for two pre-season friendlies in preparation for the new season, starting with a fixture against Club América on 20 July. The second fixture against Bayern Munich on 23 July was announced a week later. On 7 December, City announced they would play a friendly match against fellow CFG team Girona on 17 December at their Academy Stadium as a warm-up to the resumption of the post-World Cup season.

20 July 2022 Friendly	Manchester City	2–1	América	Houston, United States
19:30 CDT	De Bruyne 30', 45+1'; Cancelo (yellow card) 41'	Report	Lara (yellow card) 18'; Martín 43'; Valdez (yellow card) 59'; Layún (yellow card) 61'	Stadium: NRG Stadium; Attendance: 61,223; Referee: Armando Villarreal (United States)

23 July 2022 Friendly	Bayern Munich	0–1	Manchester City	Green Bay, United States
18:15 CDT	Kimmich (yellow card) 36'; Pavard (yellow card) 56'; Hernandez (yellow card) 68'	Report	Haaland 12'; Cancelo (yellow card) 64'; Phillips (yellow card) 66'	Stadium: Lambeau Field; Attendance: 78,128; Referee: Matthew Thompson (United States)
Note: The start of the match was postponed by 15 minutes due to lightning. The length of the match was then shortened to 80 minutes after a second lightning delay in the first half.

24 August 2022 ALS Charity Friendly	Barcelona	3–3	Manchester City	Barcelona, Spain
21:30 CEST	Aubameyang 29'; De Jong 66'; Depay 79'	Report	Álvarez 21'; Palmer 70', (yellow card) 74'; Mahrez 90+9' (pen.)	Stadium: Camp Nou; Attendance: 91,062; Referee: José María Sánchez Martínez (Spain)

17 December 2022 Friendly	Manchester City	2–0	Girona	Manchester, England
13:00 GMT	De Bruyne 5'; Haaland 18'	Report		Stadium: Academy Stadium; Attendance: 4,500; Referee: Craig Pawson (England)

== Competitions ==
=== Overall record ===
Competition	First match	Last match	Starting round	Final position	Record							
Competition	First match	Last match	Starting round	Final position	Pld	W	D	L	GF	GA	GD	Win %
Premier League	7 August 2022	28 May 2023	Matchday 1	Winners	38	28	5	5	94	33	+61	73.68
FA Cup	8 January 2023	3 June 2023	Third round	Winners	6	6	0	0	19	1	+18	100.00
EFL Cup	9 November 2022	11 January 2023	Third round	Quarter-finals	3	2	0	1	5	4	+1	66.67
FA Community Shield	30 July 2022		Final	Runners-up	1	0	0	1	1	3	−2	0.00
UEFA Champions League	6 September 2022	10 June 2023	Group stage	Winners	13	8	5	0	32	5	+27	61.54
Total					61	44	10	7	151	46	+105	72.13

Source: Soccerway

=== Premier League ===
==== League table ====
Pos	Team	Pld	W	D	L	GF	GA	GD	Pts	Qualification or relegation
1	Manchester City (C)	38	28	5	5	94	33	+61	89	Qualification to Champions League group stage
2	Arsenal	38	26	6	6	88	43	+45	84	Qualification to Champions League group stage
3	Manchester United	38	23	6	9	58	43	+15	75	Qualification to Champions League group stage
4	Newcastle United	38	19	14	5	68	33	+35	71	Qualification to Champions League group stage
5	Liverpool	38	19	10	9	75	47	+28	67	Qualification to Europa League group stage (Note: Since the winners of the 2022–23 FA Cup, Manchester City, qualified for the Champions League, the spot given to the FA Cup winners (Europa League group stage) was passed to the sixth-placed team.)

Source: Premier League
Rules for classification: 1) Points; 2) Goal difference; 3) Goals scored; 4) If the champions, relegated teams or qualified teams for UEFA competitions cannot be determined by rules 1 to 3, rules 4.1 to 4.3 are applied – 4.1) Points gained in head-to-head record between such teams; 4.2) Away goals scored in head-to-head record between such teams; 4.3) Play-offs
(C) Champions

==== Results summary ====
Overall								Home						Away					
Pld	W	D	L	GF	GA	GD	Pts	W	D	L	GF	GA	GD	W	D	L	GF	GA	GD
38	28	5	5	94	33	+61	89	17	1	1	60	17	+43	11	4	4	34	16	+18

Source: Premier League

==== Results by matchday ====
Matchday	1	2	3	4	5	6	8	9	10	11	13	14	15	16	17	18	19	20	7^{1}	21	22	23	12^{2}	24	25	26	27	29	30	31	33	34	28^{3}	35	36	37	32^{4}	38
Ground	A	H	A	H	H	A	A	H	H	A	H	A	H	H	A	H	A	A	H	H	A	H	A	A	A	H	A	H	A	H	H	A	H	H	A	H	A	A
Result	W	W	D	W	W	D	W	W	W	L	W	W	W	L	W	D	W	L	W	W	L	W	W	D	W	W	W	W	W	W	W	W	W	W	W	W	D	L
Position	4	1	2	2	2	2	2	2	2	2	2	2	2	2	2	2	2	2	2	2	2	2	1	2	2	2	2	2	2	2	2	2	1	1	1	1	1	1
Points	3	6	7	10	13	14	17	20	23	23	26	29	32	32	35	36	39	39	42	45	45	48	51	52	55	58	61	64	67	70	73	76	79	82	85	88	89	89

Source: Premier League
A = Away; H = Home; W = Win; D = Draw; L = Loss; P = Postponed
Notes:
- Positions show the situation at the end of the corresponding Game Weeks (GW), not the position at the conclusion of matches or game days.
- ^{1} Matchday 7 (vs Tottenham Hotspur) was postponed, alongside all other matches in the Premier League, due to the death and state funeral of Queen Elizabeth II.
- ^{2} Matchday 12 (vs Arsenal) was postponed to accommodate Arsenal's rearranged Europa League fixture against PSV Eindhoven.
- ^{3} Matchday 28 (vs West Ham United) was postponed to accommodate City's FA Cup quarter-final fixture against Burnley.
- ^{4} Matchday 32 (vs Brighton & Hove Albion) was postponed to accommodate City's FA Cup semi-final fixture against Sheffield United.

==== Matches ====
The league fixtures were announced on 16 June 2022.

Win Draw Loss

7 August 2022 1	West Ham United	0–2	Manchester City	Stratford
16:30 BST		Report	Haaland 36' (pen.), 65'; Cancelo (yellow card) 45+3'	Stadium: London Stadium; Attendance: 62,443; Referee: Michael Oliver

13 August 2022 2	Manchester City	4–0	Bournemouth	Manchester
15:00 BST	Gündogan 19'; De Bruyne 31'; Foden 37'; Lerma 79' (o.g.)	Report	Stacey (yellow card) 5'; Mepham (yellow card) 56'; Smith (yellow card) 90+2'	Stadium: City of Manchester Stadium; Attendance: 53,453; Referee: David Coote

21 August 2022 3	Newcastle United	3–3	Manchester City	Newcastle upon Tyne
16:30 BST	Bruno Guimarães (yellow card) 8'; Almirón 28'; Schär (yellow card) 34'; Wilson 39'; Trippier 54', (yellow card) 76'; Joelinton (yellow card) 90+2'	Report	Gündoğan 5'; Cancelo (yellow card) 18'; Stones (yellow card) 52'; Haaland 60'; Silva 64'	Stadium: St James' Park; Attendance: 52,258; Referee: Jarred Gillett

27 August 2022 4	Manchester City	4–2	Crystal Palace	Manchester
15:00 BST	Silva 53'; Haaland 62', 70', 81'; Foden (yellow card) 86'	Report	Stones 4' (o.g.); Andersen 21'; Mateta (yellow card) 81'; Guehi (yellow card) 88'	Stadium: City of Manchester Stadium; Attendance: 53,112; Referee: Darren England

31 August 2022 5	Manchester City	6–0	Nottingham Forest	Manchester
19:30 BST	Haaland 12', 23', 38'; Cancelo 50'; Álvarez 65', 87'	Report	Dennis (yellow card) 76'	Stadium: City of Manchester Stadium; Attendance: 53,409; Referee: Paul Tierney

3 September 2022 6	Aston Villa	1–1	Manchester City	Aston
17:30 BST	Cash (yellow card) 26'; Digne (yellow card) 71'; Bailey 74'	Report	Haaland 50'	Stadium: Villa Park; Attendance: 41,830; Referee: Simon Hooper

17 September 2022 8	Wolverhampton Wanderers	0–3	Manchester City	Wolverhampton
12:30 BST	Collins (red card) 33'; Nunes (yellow card) 65'; Neves (yellow card) 66'	Report	Grealish 1'; Rodri (yellow card) 13'; Haaland 16'; Foden 69'	Stadium: Molineux; Attendance: 31,578; Referee: Anthony Taylor

2 October 2022 9	Manchester City	6–3	Manchester United	Manchester
14:00 BST	Foden 8', 44', 73'; Haaland 34', 37', 64'	Report	Dalot (yellow card) 2'; Malacia (yellow card) 23'; Antony 56'; Fernandes (yellow card) 80'; Martial 84', 90+1' (pen.)	Stadium: City of Manchester Stadium; Attendance: 53,475; Referee: Michael Oliver

8 October 2022 10	Manchester City	4–0	Southampton	Manchester
15:00 BST	Cancelo 20'; Foden 32'; Mahrez 49'; Haaland 65'	Report	Walker-Peters (yellow card) 20'	Stadium: City of Manchester Stadium; Attendance: 53,365; Referee: Andrew Madley

16 October 2022 11	Liverpool	1–0	Manchester City	Liverpool
16:30 BST	Fabinho (yellow card) 63'; Salah 76'; Thiago (yellow card) 84'; Jota (yellow card) 90'	Report	Akanji (yellow card) 78'	Stadium: Anfield; Attendance: 53,286; Referee: Anthony Taylor

22 October 2022 13	Manchester City	3–1	Brighton & Hove Albion	Manchester
15:00 BST	Haaland 22', 43' (pen.); Mahrez (yellow card) 54'; De Bruyne 75'	Report	Caicedo (yellow card) 26'; Trossard 53'; Groß (yellow card) 61'; Estupiñán (yellow card) 74'	Stadium: City of Manchester Stadium; Attendance: 53,223; Referee: Craig Pawson

29 October 2022 14	Leicester City	0–1	Manchester City	Leicester
12:30 BST		Report	De Bruyne 49'	Stadium: King Power Stadium; Attendance: 32,223; Referee: Robert Jones

5 November 2022 15	Manchester City	2–1	Fulham	Manchester
15:00 GMT	Álvarez 17'; Cancelo (red card) 26'; Silva (yellow card) 45+3'; Haaland 90+5' (pen.), (yellow card) 90+7'	Report	Pereira (yellow card) 7', (goal) 28' (pen.); Reed (yellow card) 45'; Tete (yellow card) 63'; Robinson (yellow card) 90'	Stadium: City of Manchester Stadium; Attendance: 52,395; Referee: Darren England

12 November 2022 16	Manchester City	1–2	Brentford	Manchester
12:30 GMT	Haaland (yellow card) 37'; Foden 45+1'; Cancelo (yellow card) 84'	Report	Toney 16', 90+8'; Mbeumo (yellow card) 72'; Jensen (yellow card) 90+2'	Stadium: City of Manchester Stadium; Attendance: 52,786; Referee: Peter Bankes

28 December 2022 17	Leeds United	1–3	Manchester City	Leeds
20:00 GMT	Klich (yellow card) 70'; Gnonto (yellow card) 71'; Struijk 73'; Greenwood (yellow card) 85'	Report	Rodri 45+1', (yellow card) 81'; Haaland 51', 64'; Lewis (yellow card) 62'; Palmer (yellow card) 90+2'	Stadium: Elland Road; Attendance: 36,889; Referee: Stuart Attwell

31 December 2022 18	Manchester City	1–1	Everton	Manchester
15:00 GMT	Silva (yellow card) 16'; Haaland 24', (yellow card) 44'; De Bruyne (yellow card) 30'	Report	Patterson (yellow card) 33'; Tarkowski (yellow card) 45'; Onana (yellow card) 63'; Gray 64'	Stadium: City of Manchester Stadium; Attendance: 53,444; Referee: Andrew Madley

5 January 2023 19	Chelsea	0–1	Manchester City	Fulham
20:00 GMT	Kovačić (yellow card) 89'; Koulibaly (yellow card) 90+4'	Report	Mahrez 63'	Stadium: Stamford Bridge; Attendance: 39,998; Referee: Paul Tierney

14 January 2023 20	Manchester United	2–1	Manchester City	Trafford
12:30 GMT	Eriksen (yellow card) 64'; Fernandes 78'; Rashford 82'; Fred (yellow card) 88'; Casemiro (yellow card) 89'	Report	Grealish 60'	Stadium: Old Trafford; Attendance: 75,546; Referee: Stuart Attwell

19 January 2023 7	Manchester City	4–2	Tottenham Hotspur	Manchester
20:00 GMT	Mahrez (yellow card) 21', (goal) 63', 90'; Álvarez 51'; Haaland 53'	Report	Romero (yellow card) 23'; Højbjerg (yellow card) 31'; Kulusevski 44'; Emerson 45+2'	Stadium: City of Manchester Stadium; Attendance: 53,088; Referee: Simon Hooper
Note: The match was originally scheduled to be played on 10 September 2022, but was part of the league-wide postponement of all English football following the death of Queen Elizabeth II.

22 January 2023 21	Manchester City	3–0	Wolverhampton Wanderers	Manchester
14:00 GMT	Rodri (yellow card) 25'; Haaland 40', 50' (pen.), 54'	Report	Kilman (yellow card) 10'; Lemina (yellow card) 13'	Stadium: City of Manchester Stadium; Attendance: 53,282; Referee: David Coote

5 February 2023 22	Tottenham Hotspur	1–0	Manchester City	Tottenham
16:30 GMT	Kane 15'; Bentancur (yellow card) 23'; Romero (yellow card) 26' (yellow-red card) 87'; Perišić (yellow card) 75'	Report	Ederson (yellow card) 83'; Walker (yellow card) 90+7'	Stadium: Tottenham Hotspur Stadium; Attendance: 61,747; Referee: Andrew Madley

12 February 2023 23	Manchester City	3–1	Aston Villa	Manchester
16:30 GMT	Rodri 4'; Gündoğan 39'; Dias (yellow card) 41'; Mahrez 45+1' (pen.)	Report	Digne (yellow card) 37'; Watkins 61'; Konsa (yellow card) 63'	Stadium: City of Manchester Stadium; Attendance: 53,392; Referee: Robert Jones

15 February 2023 12	Arsenal	1–3	Manchester City	Holloway
19:30 GMT	Saka 42' (pen.); Tomiyasu (yellow card) 48'; Nketiah (yellow card) 64'	Report	De Bruyne 24'; Walker (yellow card) 34'; Ederson (yellow card) 36'; Silva (yellow card) 45+2'; Grealish (yellow card) 62', (goal) 72'; Haaland 82'	Stadium: Emirates Stadium; Attendance: 60,276; Referee: Anthony Taylor
Note: Originally scheduled for 19 October 2022, this match was postponed to accommodate Arsenal's rearranged Europa League fixture against PSV Eindhoven. The latter was postponed due to the severe limitations on police resources and organisational issues related to the ongoing events surrounding the national mourning for Queen Elizabeth II.

18 February 2023 24	Nottingham Forest	1–1	Manchester City	West Bridgford
15:00 GMT	Worrall (yellow card) 14'; Wood 84'	Report	Silva 41'	Stadium: City Ground; Attendance: 29,365; Referee: Graham Scott

25 February 2023 25	Bournemouth	1–4	Manchester City	Bournemouth
17:30 GMT	Ouattara (yellow card) 48'; Mepham (yellow card) 58'; Lerma 83'	Report	Álvarez 15'; Haaland 29'; Foden 45'; Mepham 51' (o.g.); Phillips (yellow card) 60'; Akanji (yellow card) 63'	Stadium: Dean Court; Attendance: 10,481; Referee: Paul Tierney

4 March 2023 26	Manchester City	2–0	Newcastle United	Manchester
12:30 GMT	Foden 15'; Aké (yellow card) 58'; Silva 67'; Haaland (yellow card) 74'	Report	Joelinton (yellow card) 53'; Burn (yellow card) 74'; Bruno Guimarães (yellow card) 76'; Lascelles (yellow card) 90+1'	Stadium: City of Manchester Stadium; Attendance: 53,419; Referee: Simon Hooper

11 March 2023 27	Crystal Palace	0–1	Manchester City	Selhurst
17:30 GMT	Milivojević (yellow card) 30'; Andersen (yellow card) 90+3'	Report	Dias (yellow card) 59'; Aké (yellow card) 65'; Haaland 78' (pen.)	Stadium: Selhurst Park; Attendance: 25,844; Referee: Robert Jones

1 April 2023 29	Manchester City	4–1	Liverpool	Manchester
12:30 BST	Álvarez 27'; Rodri (yellow card) 33'; De Bruyne 46'; Gündoğan 53'; Grealish 74'	Report	Salah 17', (yellow card) 20'	Stadium: City of Manchester Stadium; Attendance: 52,877; Referee: Simon Hooper

8 April 2023 30	Southampton	1–4	Manchester City	Southampton
17:30 BST	Mara 72'	Report	Stones (yellow card) 36'; Haaland 45', 68', (yellow card) 56'; Grealish 58'; Álvarez 75' (pen.)	Stadium: St Mary's Stadium; Attendance: 30,963; Referee: Robert Jones

15 April 2023 31	Manchester City	3–1	Leicester City	Manchester
17:30 BST	Stones 5'; Haaland 13' (pen.), 25'; Silva (yellow card) 45'	Report	Iheanacho 75'; Söyüncü (yellow card) 89'	Stadium: City of Manchester Stadium; Attendance: 53,329; Referee: Darren England

26 April 2023 33	Manchester City	4–1	Arsenal	Manchester
20:00 BST	De Bruyne 7', 54'; Stones 45+1'; Dias (yellow card) 45+5'; Grealish (yellow card) 75'; Rodri (yellow card) 88'; Haaland 90+5'	Report	Partey (yellow card) 76'; Holding 86'	Stadium: City of Manchester Stadium; Attendance: 53,482; Referee: Michael Oliver

30 April 2023 34	Fulham	1–2	Manchester City	Fulham
14:00 BST	Carlos Vinícius 15'; Tete (yellow card) 70'	Report	Haaland 3' (pen.); Álvarez 36'; Grealish (yellow card) 70'; Ederson (yellow card) 90+6'; Walker (yellow card) 90+8'	Stadium: Craven Cottage; Attendance: 24,498; Referee: Simon Hooper

3 May 2023 28	Manchester City	3–0	West Ham United	Manchester
20:00 BST	Aké 50'; Haaland 70'; Foden 85'	Report	Downes (yellow card) 49'	Stadium: City of Manchester Stadium; Attendance: 53,305; Referee: John Brooks
Note: Originally scheduled for 18 March, the fixture was postponed due to City's participation in the FA Cup quarter-finals.

6 May 2023 35	Manchester City	2–1	Leeds United	Manchester
15:00 BST	Gündoğan 19', 27', (penalty missed) 84'	Report	Gnonto (yellow card) 45+2'; Rodrigo (yellow card) 71', (goal) 85'; McKennie (yellow card) 90+3'	Stadium: City of Manchester Stadium; Attendance: 53,406; Referee: Andrew Madley

14 May 2023 36	Everton	0–3	Manchester City	Liverpool
14:00 BST	Garner (yellow card) 49'	Report	Gündoğan 37', 51'; Haaland 39'	Stadium: Goodison Park; Attendance: 39,376; Referee: Anthony Taylor

21 May 2023 37	Manchester City	1–0	Chelsea	Manchester
16:00 BST	Álvarez 12'	Report	Havertz (yellow card) 18'; Fernández (yellow card) 66'	Stadium: City of Manchester Stadium; Attendance: 53,490; Referee: Michael Oliver

24 May 2023 32	Brighton & Hove Albion	1–1	Manchester City	Falmer
20:00 BST	Enciso 38'; Veltman (yellow card) 89'; Van Hecke (yellow card) 90+1'	Report	Foden 25'; Silva (yellow card) 41'	Stadium: Falmer Stadium; Attendance: 31,388; Referee: Simon Hooper
Note: Originally scheduled for 22 April, the fixture was postponed due to the both teams' participation in the FA Cup semi-finals.

28 May 2023 38	Brentford	1–0	Manchester City	Brentford
16:30 BST	Wissa (yellow card) 55'; Damsgaard (yellow card) 65'; Janelt (yellow card) 77'; Jørgensen (yellow card) 84'; Pinnock 85'	Report		Stadium: Brentford Community Stadium; Attendance: 17,120; Referee: John Brooks

=== FA Cup ===
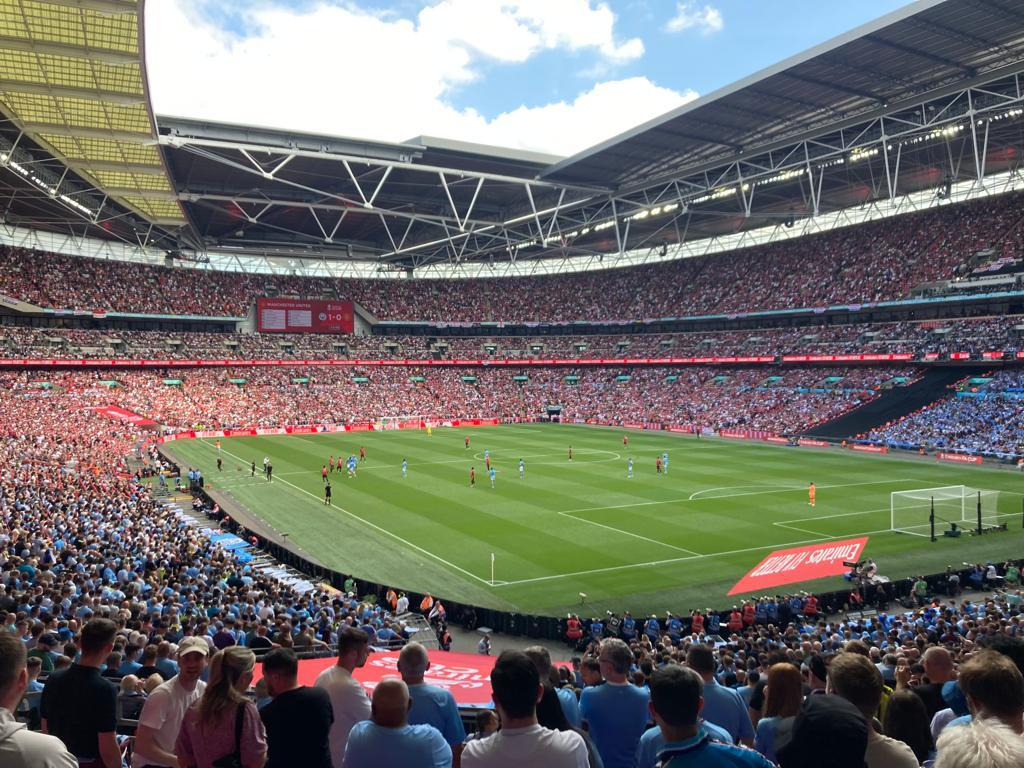
Wembley Stadium, as seen from the stands, during the 2023 FA Cup final

City entered the competition in the third round and were drawn at home to Chelsea, making it a rematch of the third round League Cup tie earlier that season. The fourth round draw was held shortly before City's third round tie against Chelsea, with the Blues drawn against the winner of the following day's Oxford United vs Arsenal tie. In the fifth round, City were drawn away to Bristol City. After their victory, the Cityzens were drawn at home to Burnley in the quarter-finals. In the semi-finals, the Blues were paired with Sheffield United with a potential derby in the final at stake. City defeated Sheffield 3–0, while Manchester United overcame Brighton on penalties after a goalless draw to set up the first-ever Manchester derby in a major cup final.

8 January 2023 Third round	Manchester City	4–0	Chelsea	Manchester
16:30 GMT	Mahrez 23', 85' (pen.); Álvarez 30' (pen.); Foden 38'; Rodri (yellow card) 54'; Silva (yellow card) 70'; Cancelo (yellow card) 87'	Report	Gallagher (yellow card) 62'	Stadium: City of Manchester Stadium; Attendance: 51,505; Referee: Robert Jones

27 January 2023 Fourth round	Manchester City	1–0	Arsenal	Manchester
20:00 GMT	Aké 64'; Gündoğan (yellow card) 90+3'	Report	Holding (yellow card) 42'; Zinchenko (yellow card) 90+2'	Stadium: City of Manchester Stadium; Attendance: 51,694; Referee: Paul Tierney

28 February 2023 Fifth round	Bristol City	0–3	Manchester City	Bristol
20:00 GMT	Williams (yellow card) 87'	Report	Foden 7', 74', (yellow card) 66'; De Bruyne 81'; Silva (yellow card) 87'	Stadium: Ashton Gate Stadium; Attendance: 25,713; Referee: Andre Marriner

18 March 2023 Quarter-finals	Manchester City	6–0	Burnley	Manchester
18:00 GMT	Haaland 32', 35', 59'; Álvarez 62', 73'; Palmer 68'	Report	Barnes (yellow card) 90+1'	Stadium: City of Manchester Stadium; Attendance: 51,688; Referee: John Brooks

22 April 2023 Semi-finals	Manchester City	3–0	Sheffield United	London
16:45 BST	Mahrez 43' (pen.), 61', 66'	Report	Norwood (yellow card) 74'	Stadium: Wembley Stadium; Attendance: 69,603; Referee: Stuart Attwell

3 June 2023 Final	Manchester City	2–1	Manchester United	London
15:00 BST	Gündoğan 1', 51'; Ortega (yellow card) 81'; Rodri (yellow card) 90'	Report	Fernandes 33' (pen.); Wan-Bissaka (yellow card) 45+4'; Fred (yellow card) 79'	Stadium: Wembley Stadium; Attendance: 83,179; Referee: Paul Tierney

=== EFL Cup ===
City entered the competition in the third round. The draw was held on 24 August 2022 after the second round fixtures were completed, and they were drawn at home to the previous season's runners-up Chelsea as one of seven all-Premier League ties. The draw for the fourth round was held after the final match of the third round between Manchester United and Aston Villa on 10 November, by Peter Schmeichel and Dion Dublin. City were drawn at home to the cup holders Liverpool. The tie would be held immediately after the World Cup final, before the resumption of league fixtures. City were handed an away tie at Southampton in the quarter-finals draw, held immediately after their fourth round victory over Liverpool.

9 November 2022 Third round	Manchester City	2–0	Chelsea	Manchester
20:00 GMT	Mahrez 53'; Álvarez 58'; Grealish (yellow card) 89'	Report	Koulibaly (yellow card) 18'; Chalobah (yellow card) 52'; Azpilicueta (yellow card) 89'	Stadium: City of Manchester Stadium; Attendance: 52,148; Referee: Simon Hooper

22 December 2022 Fourth round	Manchester City	3–2	Liverpool	Manchester
20:00 GMT	Haaland 10'; Mahrez 47'; Aké 58'; Rodri (yellow card) 79'	Report	Carvalho 20'; Bajcetic (yellow card) 35'; Salah 48'; Fabinho (yellow card) 79'; Keïta (yellow card) 83'	Stadium: City of Manchester Stadium; Attendance: 52,423; Referee: David Coote

11 January 2023 Quarter-finals	Southampton	2–0	Manchester City	Southampton
20:00 GMT	Mara 23'; Lavia (yellow card) 25'; Djenepo 28'; Diallo (yellow card) 79'	Report		Stadium: St Mary's Stadium; Attendance: 22,996; Referee: Peter Bankes

=== FA Community Shield ===
The traditional season curtain raiser was played between Manchester City and Liverpool, the previous season's league champions and FA Cup winners respectively. Normally held at Wembley Stadium, this season's edition was played at Leicester City's King Power Stadium to avoid clashes with UEFA Women's Euro 2022.

30 July 2022 Final	Liverpool	3–1	Manchester City	Leicester
17:00 BST	Alexander-Arnold 21'; Salah 83' (pen.); Núñez 90+4', (yellow card) 90+5'	Report	Álvarez 70'; Dias (yellow card) 83'	Stadium: King Power Stadium; Attendance: 28,545; Referee: Craig Pawson
Note: Live on ITV

=== UEFA Champions League ===
==== Group stage ====
The 2022–23 UEFA Champions League group stage draw took place in Istanbul, Turkey, on 25 August 2022. The first group matches were played on 6 September, and they wrapped up earlier than usual, at the start of November, to accommodate the mid-season FIFA World Cup.

Pos	Team	Pld	W	D	L	GF	GA	GD	Pts	Qualification	MCI	DOR	SEV	CPH
1	(England) Manchester City	6	4	2	0	14	2	+12	14	Advance to knockout phase	—	2–1	3–1	5–0
2	(Germany) Borussia Dortmund	6	2	3	1	10	5	+5	9	Advance to knockout phase	0–0	—	1–1	3–0
3	(Spain) Sevilla	6	1	2	3	6	12	−6	5	Transfer to Europa League	0–4	1–4	—	3–0
4	(Denmark) Copenhagen	6	0	3	3	1	12	−11	3		0–0	1–1	0–0	—

Source: UEFA
Rules for classification: Group stage tiebreakers

6 September 2022 1	Sevilla (Spain)	0–4	(England) Manchester City	Seville, Spain
21:00 CEST	Mir (yellow card) 89'	Report	Haaland 20', 67'; Foden 58'; Dias 90+2'	Stadium: Ramón Sánchez Pizjuán; Attendance: 38,764; Referee: Davide Massa (Italy)

14 September 2022 2	Manchester City (England)	2–1	(Germany) Borussia Dortmund	Manchester
20:00 BST	Rodri (yellow card) 53'; Stones 80'; Haaland 84'; Foden (yellow card) 90+4'	Report	Bellingham 56'; Malen (yellow card) 79'; Özcan (yellow card) 88'; Meunier (yellow card) 90+4'	Stadium: City of Manchester Stadium; Attendance: 50,441; Referee: Daniele Orsato (Italy)

5 October 2022 3	Manchester City (England)	5–0	(Denmark) Copenhagen	Manchester
20:00 BST	Haaland 7', 32'; Khocholava 39' (o.g.); Mahrez 55' (pen.); Álvarez 76'	Report	Stamenic (yellow card) 54'	Stadium: City of Manchester Stadium; Attendance: 51,765; Referee: Donatas Rumšas (Lithuania)

11 October 2022 4	Copenhagen (Denmark)	0–0	(England) Manchester City	Copenhagen, Denmark
18:45 CEST	Lund (yellow card) 35'; Stamenic (yellow card) 82'	Report	Mahrez (penalty missed) 25'; Gómez (red card) 30'; Dias (yellow card) 90+2'	Stadium: Parken Stadium; Attendance: 35,447; Referee: Artur Soares Dias (Portugal)

25 October 2022 5	Borussia Dortmund (Germany)	0–0	(England) Manchester City	Dortmund, Germany
21:00 CET	Hummels (yellow card) 87'	Report	Cancelo (yellow card) 7'; Álvarez (yellow card) 31'; Mahrez (penalty missed) 58'; Gündoğan (yellow card) 59'; Akanji (yellow card) 72'	Stadium: Westfalenstadion; Attendance: 81,000; Referee: Davide Massa (Italy)

2 November 2022 6	Manchester City (England)	3–1	(Spain) Sevilla	Manchester
20:00 GMT	Lewis 52'; Álvarez 73'; Mahrez 83'	Report	Mir 31'	Stadium: City of Manchester Stadium; Attendance: 51,610; Referee: Orel Grinfeld (Israel)

==== Knockout phase ====
===== Round of 16 =====
The draw for the round of 16 was held on 7 November 2022 at UEFA's headquarters in Nyon, with Manchester City being drawn against RB Leipzig.

22 February 2023 First leg	RB Leipzig (Germany)	1–1	(England) Manchester City	Leipzig, Germany
21:00 CET	Gvardiol 70'; Henrichs (yellow card) 89'	Report	Mahrez 27'	Stadium: Leipzig Stadium; Attendance: 45,228; Referee: Serdar Gözübüyük (Netherlands)

14 March 2023 Second leg	Manchester City (England)	7–0 (8–1 agg.)	(Germany) RB Leipzig	Manchester
20:00 GMT	Haaland 22' (pen.), 24', 45+2', 53', 57'; Gündoğan 49'; De Bruyne (yellow card) 67', (goal) 90+2'; Akanji (yellow card) 77'	Report	Henrichs (yellow card) 21'; Werner (yellow card) 34'	Stadium: City of Manchester Stadium; Attendance: 52,038; Referee: Slavko Vinčić (Slovenia)

===== Quarter-finals =====
The draw for the quarter-finals and semi-finals was held on 17 March 2023. City were drawn against Bayern Munich in the quarter-finals, with the winner of that tie playing either Real Madrid or Chelsea in the semi-finals.

11 April 2023 First leg	Manchester City (England)	3–0	(Germany) Bayern Munich	Manchester
20:00 BST	Rodri 27'; Silva (yellow card) 48', (goal) 70'; Haaland 76'	Report	Davies (yellow card) 49'; Pavard (yellow card) 88'	Stadium: City of Manchester Stadium; Attendance: 52,257; Referee: Jesús Gil Manzano (Spain)

19 April 2023 Second leg	Bayern Munich (Germany)	1–1 (1–4 agg.)	(England) Manchester City	Munich, Germany
21:00 CEST	Cancelo (yellow card) 11'; Upamecano (yellow card) 35'; Kimmich (yellow card) 45+2', (goal) 83' (pen.); Pavard (yellow card) 60'; Stanišić (yellow card) 88'	Report	Haaland (penalty missed) 38', 57'; Ederson (yellow card) 44'; Gündoğan (yellow card) 45+2'; Aké (yellow card) 54'; Laporte (yellow card) 86'	Stadium: Munich Football Arena; Attendance: 75,000; Referee: Clément Turpin (France)
Note: Bayern manager Thomas Tuchel was sent off in the 86th minute.

===== Semi-finals =====
9 May 2023 First leg	Real Madrid (Spain)	1–1	(England) Manchester City	Madrid, Spain
21:00 CEST	Vinícius 36'; Kroos (yellow card) 45+3'; Camavinga (yellow card) 79'	Report	De Bruyne 67'; Gündoğan (yellow card) 71'; Silva (yellow card) 86'	Stadium: Santiago Bernabéu; Attendance: 63,485; Referee: Artur Soares Dias (Portugal)

17 May 2023 Second leg	Manchester City (England)	4–0 (5–1 agg.)	(Spain) Real Madrid	Manchester
20:00 BST	Silva 23', 37'; Dias (yellow card) 50'; Gündoğan (yellow card) 62'; Akanji 76'; Grealish (yellow card) 90+1'; Álvarez 90+1'	Report	Carvajal (yellow card) 55'; Camavinga (yellow card) 75'	Stadium: City of Manchester Stadium; Attendance: 52,313; Referee: Szymon Marciniak (Poland)

===== Final =====
10 June 2023 Final	Manchester City (England)	1–0	(Italy) Inter Milan	Istanbul, Turkey
22:00 TRT (UTC+3)	Rodri 68'; Haaland (yellow card) 90+2'; Ederson (yellow card) 90+4'	Report	Barella (yellow card) 59'; Lukaku (yellow card) 83'; Onana (yellow card) 90+2'	Stadium: Atatürk Olympic Stadium; Attendance: 71,412; Referee: Szymon Marciniak (Poland)

== Statistics ==
=== Overall ===
Appearances numbers are for appearances in competitive games only, including sub appearances.
Red card numbers denote: numbers in parentheses represent red cards overturned for wrongful dismissal.
Source for all stats:

No.	Player	Pos.	Premier League				FA Cup				EFL Cup				Community Shield				Champions League				Total			
No.	Player	Pos.	👕	Goal	Yellow card	Red card	👕	Goal	Yellow card	Red card	👕	Goal	Yellow card	Red card	👕	Goal	Yellow card	Red card	👕	Goal	Yellow card	Red card	👕	Goal	Yellow card	Red card
2	(England) Kyle Walker	DF	27		3		5				1				1				5				39		3	
3	(Portugal) Rúben Dias	DF	26		3		3				1				1		1		12	1	2		43	1	6	
4	(England) Kalvin Phillips	MF	12		1		4				2								3				21		1	
5	(England) John Stones	DF	23	2	2		2				1								8	1			34	3	2	
6	(Netherlands) Nathan Aké	DF	27	1	3		3	1			3	1			1				8		1		42	3	4	
7	(Portugal) João Cancelo	DF	17	2	3	1	1		1		1				1				6		1		26	2	5	1
8	(Germany) İlkay Gündoğan	MF	31	8			3	2	1		3				1				13	1	4		51	11	5	
9	(Norway) Erling Haaland	FW	35	36	5		4	3			2	1			1				11	12	1		53	52	6	
10	(England) Jack Grealish	MF	28	5	4		5				3		1		1				13		1		50	5	6	
14	(Spain) Aymeric Laporte	DF	12				5				3								4		1		24		1	
16	(Spain) Rodri	MF	36	2	5		4		2		3		1		1				12	2	1		56	4	9	
17	(Belgium) Kevin De Bruyne	MF	32	7	1		4	1			2				1				10	2	1		49	10	2	
18	(Germany) Stefan Ortega	GK	3				6		1		3								2				14		1	
19	(Argentina) Julián Álvarez	FW	30	9			5	3			2	1			1	1			10	3	1		48	17	1	
20	(Portugal) Bernardo Silva	MF	34	4	5		5		2		2				1				12	4	2		55	7	9	
21	(Spain) Sergio Gómez	DF	12				4				2								5			1	23			1
25	(Switzerland) Manuel Akanji	DF	29		2		6				2								11	1	2		48	1	4	
26	(Algeria) Riyad Mahrez	FW	30	5	2		5	5			2	2			1				9	3			47	15	2	
31	(Brazil) Ederson	GK	35		3		1								1				11		2		48		5	
32	(Argentina) Máximo Perrone	MF	1				1																2			
33	(England) Scott Carson	GK																								
47	(England) Phil Foden	MF	32	11	1		5	3			2				1				8	1	1		48	15	2	
62	(Northern Ireland) Shea Charles	DF	1																				1			
80	(England) Cole Palmer	MF	14		1		4	1			3								4				25	1	1	
82	(England) Rico Lewis	DF	14		1		5				2								2	1			23	1	1	
97	(England) Josh Wilson-Esbrand	DF																	2				2			
Own goals				2																1				3		
Totals				94	44	1		19	8	0		5	2	0		1	1	0		32	21	1		151	76	2

=== Goalscorers ===
Includes all competitive matches. The list is sorted alphabetically by surname when total goals are equal.

Rank	No.	Pos.	Player	Premier League	FA Cup	EFL Cup	Community Shield	Champions League	Total
1	9	FW	(Norway) Erling Haaland	36	3	1	0	12	52
2	19	FW	(Argentina) Julián Álvarez	9	3	1	1	3	17
3	47	MF	(England) Phil Foden	11	3	0	0	1	15
3	26	FW	(Algeria) Riyad Mahrez	5	5	2	0	3	15
5	8	MF	(Germany) İlkay Gündoğan	8	2	0	0	1	11
6	17	MF	(Belgium) Kevin De Bruyne	7	1	0	0	2	10
7	20	MF	(Portugal) Bernardo Silva	4	0	0	0	3	7
8	10	MF	(England) Jack Grealish	5	0	0	0	0	5
9	16	MF	(Spain) Rodri	2	0	0	0	2	4
10	6	DF	(Netherlands) Nathan Aké	1	1	1	0	0	3
10	5	DF	(England) John Stones	2	0	0	0	1	3
12	7	DF	(Portugal) João Cancelo	2	0	0	0	0	2
13	25	DF	(Switzerland) Manuel Akanji	0	0	0	0	1	1
13	3	DF	(Portugal) Rúben Dias	0	0	0	0	1	1
13	82	DF	(England) Rico Lewis	0	0	0	0	1	1
13	80	MF	(England) Cole Palmer	0	1	0	0	0	1
Own goals				2	0	0	0	1	3
Totals				94	19	5	1	32	151

=== Assists ===
Includes all competitive matches. The list is sorted alphabetically by surname when total assists are equal.

Rank	No.	Pos.	Player	Premier League	FA Cup	EFL Cup	Community Shield	Champions League	Total
1	17	MF	(Belgium) Kevin De Bruyne	16	4	2	0	7	29
2	26	FW	(Algeria) Riyad Mahrez	10	1	0	0	2	13
3	10	MF	(England) Jack Grealish	7	3	0	0	1	11
4	47	MF	(England) Phil Foden	6	1	0	0	2	9
4	9	FW	(Norway) Erling Haaland	8	0	0	0	1	9
6	16	MF	(Spain) Rodri	6	0	1	0	0	7
7	20	MF	(Portugal) Bernardo Silva	5	0	0	0	1	6
7	8	MF	(Germany) İlkay Gündoğan	4	0	0	0	2	6
9	7	DF	(Portugal) João Cancelo	1	0	0	0	4	5
10	19	FW	(Argentina) Julián Álvarez	0	2	0	0	2	4
11	5	DF	(England) John Stones	2	0	0	0	1	3
12	21	DF	(Spain) Sergio Gómez	1	0	0	0	1	2
13	25	DF	(Switzerland) Manuel Akanji	1	0	0	0	0	1
13	31	GK	(Brazil) Ederson	1	0	0	0	0	1
13	80	MF	(England) Cole Palmer	1	0	0	0	0	1
13	2	DF	(England) Kyle Walker	0	1	0	0	0	1
Totals				69	12	3	0	24	108

=== Disciplinary record ===
Includes all competitive matches. The list is sorted alphabetically by surname when total cards are equal.

Rank	No.	Pos.	Player	Premier League			FA Cup			EFL Cup			Community Shield			Champions League			Total		
Rank	No.	Pos.	Player	Yellow card	(yellow card) (yellow-red card)	Red card	Yellow card	(yellow card) (yellow-red card)	Red card	Yellow card	(yellow card) (yellow-red card)	Red card	Yellow card	(yellow card) (yellow-red card)	Red card	Yellow card	(yellow card) (yellow-red card)	Red card	Yellow card	(yellow card) (yellow-red card)	Red card
1	16	MF	(Spain) Rodri	5	0	0	2	0	0	1	0	0	0	0	0	1	0	0	9	0	0
1	20	MF	(Portugal) Bernardo Silva	5	0	0	2	0	0	0	0	0	0	0	0	2	0	0	9	0	0
3	3	DF	(Portugal) Rúben Dias	3	0	0	0	0	0	0	0	0	1	0	0	2	0	0	6	0	0
3	10	MF	(England) Jack Grealish	4	0	0	0	0	0	1	0	0	0	0	0	1	0	0	6	0	0
3	9	FW	(Norway) Erling Haaland	5	0	0	0	0	0	0	0	0	0	0	0	1	0	0	6	0	0
6	7	DF	(Portugal) João Cancelo	3	0	1	1	0	0	0	0	0	0	0	0	1	0	0	5	0	1
7	31	GK	(Brazil) Ederson	3	0	0	0	0	0	0	0	0	0	0	0	2	0	0	5	0	0
7	8	MF	(Germany) İlkay Gündoğan	0	0	0	1	0	0	0	0	0	0	0	0	4	0	0	5	0	0
9	25	DF	(Switzerland) Manuel Akanji	2	0	0	0	0	0	0	0	0	0	0	0	2	0	0	4	0	0
10	3	DF	(Netherlands) Nathan Aké	2	0	0	0	0	0	0	0	0	0	0	0	1	0	0	3	0	0
10	47	MF	(England) Phil Foden	1	0	0	1	0	0	0	0	0	0	0	0	1	0	0	3	0	0
10	2	DF	(England) Kyle Walker	3	0	0	0	0	0	0	0	0	0	0	0	0	0	0	3	0	0
13	17	MF	(Belgium) Kevin De Bruyne	1	0	0	0	0	0	0	0	0	0	0	0	1	0	0	2	0	0
13	26	FW	(Algeria) Riyad Mahrez	2	0	0	0	0	0	0	0	0	0	0	0	0	0	0	2	0	0
13	5	DF	(England) John Stones	2	0	0	0	0	0	0	0	0	0	0	0	0	0	0	2	0	0
16	21	DF	(Spain) Sergio Gómez	0	0	0	0	0	0	0	0	0	0	0	0	0	0	1	0	0	1
17	19	FW	(Argentina) Julián Álvarez	0	0	0	0	0	0	0	0	0	0	0	0	1	0	0	1	0	0
17	14	DF	(Spain) Aymeric Laporte	0	0	0	0	0	0	0	0	0	0	0	0	1	0	0	1	0	0
17	82	DF	(England) Rico Lewis	1	0	0	0	0	0	0	0	0	0	0	0	0	0	0	1	0	0
17	18	GK	(Germany) Stefan Ortega	0	0	0	1	0	0	0	0	0	0	0	0	0	0	0	1	0	0
17	80	MF	(England) Kalvin Phillips	1	0	0	0	0	0	0	0	0	0	0	0	0	0	0	1	0	0
17	4	MF	(England) Cole Palmer	1	0	0	0	0	0	0	0	0	0	0	0	0	0	0	1	0	0
Total				44	0	1	8	0	0	2	0	0	1	0	0	21	0	1	76	0	2

=== Hat-tricks ===
Player	Against	Result	Date	Competition	Ref.
(Norway) Erling Haaland	Crystal Palace (H)	4–2	27 August 2022	Premier League	
(Norway) Erling Haaland	Nottingham Forest (H)	6–0	31 August 2022	Premier League	
(Norway) Erling Haaland	Manchester United (H)	6–3	2 October 2022	Premier League	
(England) Phil Foden	Manchester United (H)	6–3	2 October 2022	Premier League	
(Norway) Erling Haaland	Wolverhampton Wanderers (H)	3–0	22 January 2023	Premier League	
(Norway) Erling Haaland	RB Leipzig (H)^{5}	7–0	14 March 2023	Champions League	
(Norway) Erling Haaland	Burnley (H)	6–0	18 March 2023	FA Cup	
(Algeria) Riyad Mahrez	Sheffield United (N)	3–0	22 April 2023	FA Cup	

^{4} – Player scored four goals.

^{5} – Player scored five goals.

=== Clean sheets ===
The list is sorted by shirt number when total clean sheets are equal. Numbers in parentheses represent matches where both goalkeepers participated and both kept a clean sheet; the number in parentheses is awarded to the goalkeeper who was substituted on, whilst a full clean sheet is awarded to the goalkeeper who was on the field at the start of play.

Goalkeepers					Clean sheets					
Rank	No.	Player	Apps	Goals conceded	Premier League	FA Cup	EFL Cup	Community Shield	Champions League	Total
1	31	(Brazil) Ederson	47 (1)	39	11	0	0	0	7	18
2	18	(Germany) Stefan Ortega	14	7	2	5	1	0	1	9
3	33	(England) Scott Carson	0	0	0	0	0	0	0	0
Totals				46	13	5	1	0	8	27

== Awards ==
=== Etihad Player of the Year ===
Awarded by an online vote of supporters on the official Manchester City F.C. website.

Player	Ref.
(Norway) Erling Haaland	

=== UEFA Men's Player of the Year ===
Player	Ref.
(Norway) Erling Haaland	

=== PFA Players' Player of the Year ===
Awarded by a vote of PFA members.

Player	Ref.
(Norway) Erling Haaland	

=== Premier League Player of the Season ===
Awarded by a vote of a shortlist on the Premier League website.

Player	Ref.
(Norway) Erling Haaland	

=== Premier League Young Player of the Season ===
Awarded by a vote of a shortlist on the Premier League website

Player	Ref.
(Norway) Erling Haaland	

=== FWA Footballer of the Year ===
Player	Ref.
(Norway) Erling Haaland	

=== UEFA Champions League Player of the Season ===
Selected by the UEFA technical study group at the end of the tournament.

Player	Ref.
(Spain) Rodri	

=== European Golden Shoe ===
Awarded to the highest goalscorer of all European top-division national leagues throughout the season.

Season	Player	Goals	Points	Ref.
2022–23	(Norway) Erling Haaland	36	72	

=== Premier League Golden Boot ===
Player	Goals	Ref.
(Norway) Erling Haaland	36	

=== Premier League Playmaker of the Season ===
Player	Assists	Ref.
(Belgium) Kevin De Bruyne	16	

=== UEFA Men's Coach of the Year ===
Manager	Ref.
(Spain) Pep Guardiola	

=== Premier League Manager of the Season ===
Awarded by a vote of a shortlist on the Premier League website.

Manager	Ref.
(Spain) Pep Guardiola	

=== LMA Manager of the Year ===
Manager	Ref.
(Spain) Pep Guardiola	

=== UEFA Champions League Team of the Season ===
The UEFA technical study group selected the following City players as part of the team of the tournament.

Pos.	Player
DF	(England) Kyle Walker
DF	(Portugal) Rúben Dias
MF	(England) John Stones
MF	(Belgium) Kevin De Bruyne
MF	(Spain) Rodri
FW	(Portugal) Bernardo Silva
FW	(Norway) Erling Haaland

=== PFA Team of the Year ===
Voted for by PFA members.

Pos.	Player
DF	(Portugal) Rúben Dias
DF	(England) John Stones
MF	(Belgium) Kevin De Bruyne
MF	(Spain) Rodri
FW	(Norway) Erling Haaland

=== Premier League Player of the Month ===
Awarded by a combination of an online public vote on the EA Sports website with those of a panel of football experts.

Month	Player	Ref.
August	(Norway) Erling Haaland	
April	(Norway) Erling Haaland	

=== Etihad Player of the Month ===
Awarded by an online vote of supporters on the official Manchester City F.C. website.

Month	Player	Ref.
August	(Norway) Erling Haaland	
September	(Norway) Erling Haaland	
October	(Switzerland) Manuel Akanji	
November	(Argentina) Julián Álvarez	
December	(Algeria) Riyad Mahrez	
January	(Algeria) Riyad Mahrez	
February	(England) Jack Grealish	
March	(Norway) Erling Haaland	
April	(England) John Stones	

== See also ==
- 2022–23 in English football
- List of Manchester City F.C. seasons
