= John Stones =

English footballer (born 1994)

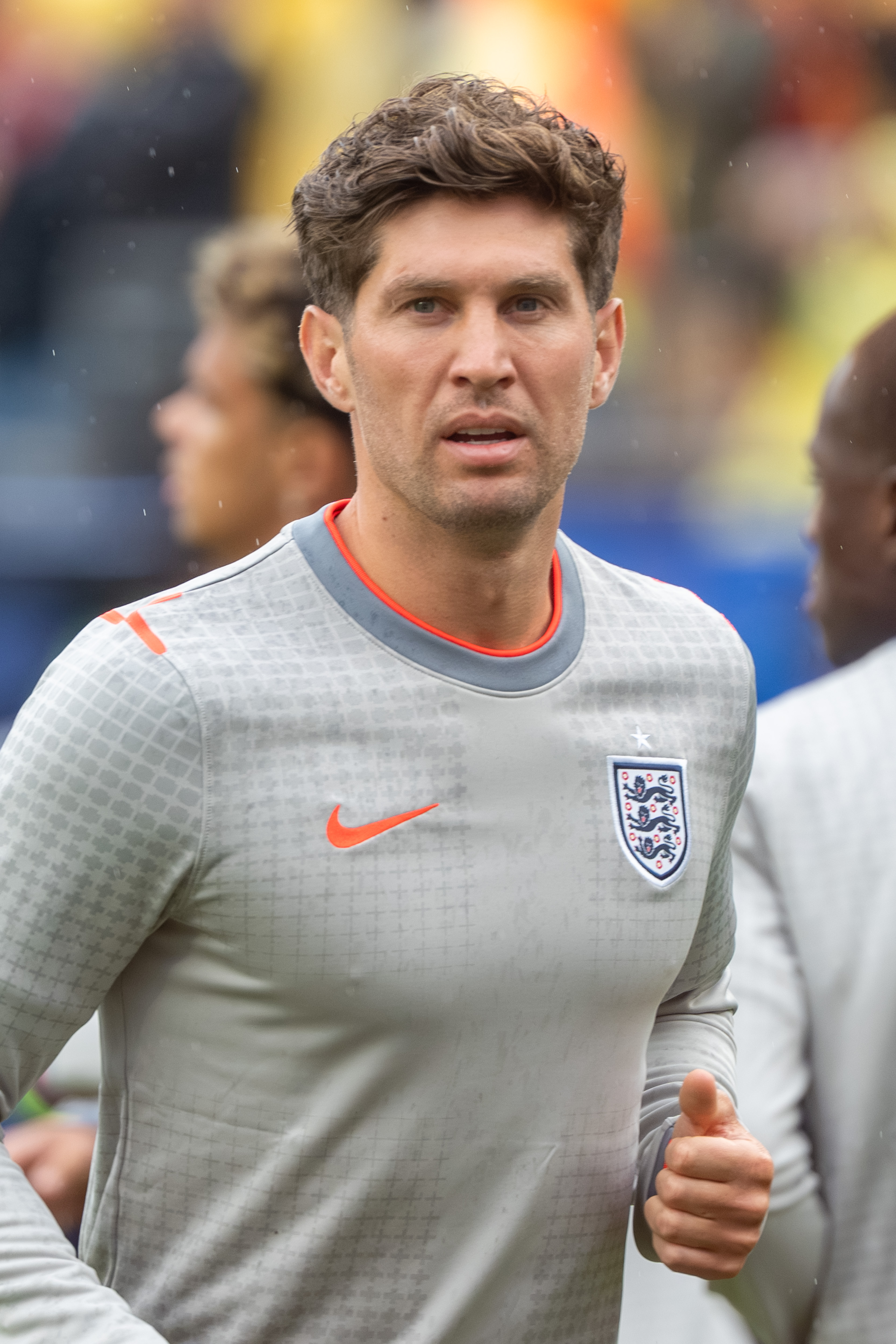
- Stones with England in 2026

Personal information
- Full name: John Stones
- Date of birth: 28 May 1994 (age 32)
- Place of birth: Barnsley, South Yorkshire, England
- Height: 6 ft 2 in (1.88 m)
- Positions: Centre-back; defensive midfielder

Team information
- Current team: Inter Milan
- Number: 6

Youth career
- 2001–2012: Barnsley

Senior career*
Years	Team	Apps	(Gls)
2012–2013	Barnsley	24	(0)
2013–2016	Everton	77	(1)
2016–2026	Manchester City	180	(10)
2026–	Inter Milan	3	(0)

International career^{‡}
2012–2013	England U19	3	(0)
2013	England U20	2	(0)
2013–2015	England U21	13	(0)
2014–	England	94	(3)
Medal record
Men's football
Representing England
FIFA World Cup
Third place	2026 Canada–Mexico–US
UEFA European Championship
Runner-up	2020 Europe
Runner-up	2024 Germany
UEFA Nations League
Third place	2019 Portugal
- * Club domestic league appearances and goals as of 22:10, 14 September 2026 (UTC) ‡ National team caps and goals as of 15:20, 16 July 2026 (UTC)

John Stones (born 28 May 1994) is an English professional footballer who plays as a centre-back for Serie A club Inter Milan and the England national team. He is known for his technical ability and physical presence on the pitch.

Stones began his career with Barnsley, making his first-team debut in the Championship in March 2012 as a 17-year-old. He joined Premier League club Everton for around £3 million in January 2013 and amassed 95 appearances over four seasons. In August 2016, he signed for Manchester City for an initial £47.5 million with add-ons. With the club, he won six Premier League titles, three FA Cups, five EFL Cups, and the UEFA Champions League as part of a historic continental treble in the 2022–23 season. After ten years with the side, Stones joined Italian club Inter Milan in 2026.

Stones made his senior debut for England in May 2014 after previously being capped by England youth teams at under-19, under-20, and under-21 levels. He was chosen in England's squads for the UEFA European Championship in 2016, 2020, and 2024, reaching the final of the latter two tournaments, and the FIFA World Cup in 2018, 2022, and 2026.

== Early life ==
John Stones was born on 28 May 1994 in Barnsley, a town in the county of South Yorkshire in England, to parents Janet and Peter Stones. He grew up in Thurlstone and attended Penistone Grammar School.

== Club career ==
=== Barnsley ===
Stones came through the Barnsley youth academy to sign a professional contract in December 2011. He made his first-team debut in the Championship on 17 March 2012, in a 4–0 defeat to Reading at Oakwell, replacing Scott Wiseman after 52 minutes. He scored his only goal for Barnsley on his first start, equalising before half time in a League Cup first round match away to Rochdale on 11 August 2012, which resulted in a 4–3 victory after extra time. A week later, he made his first league start, in a 1–0 victory against Middlesbrough.

=== Everton ===
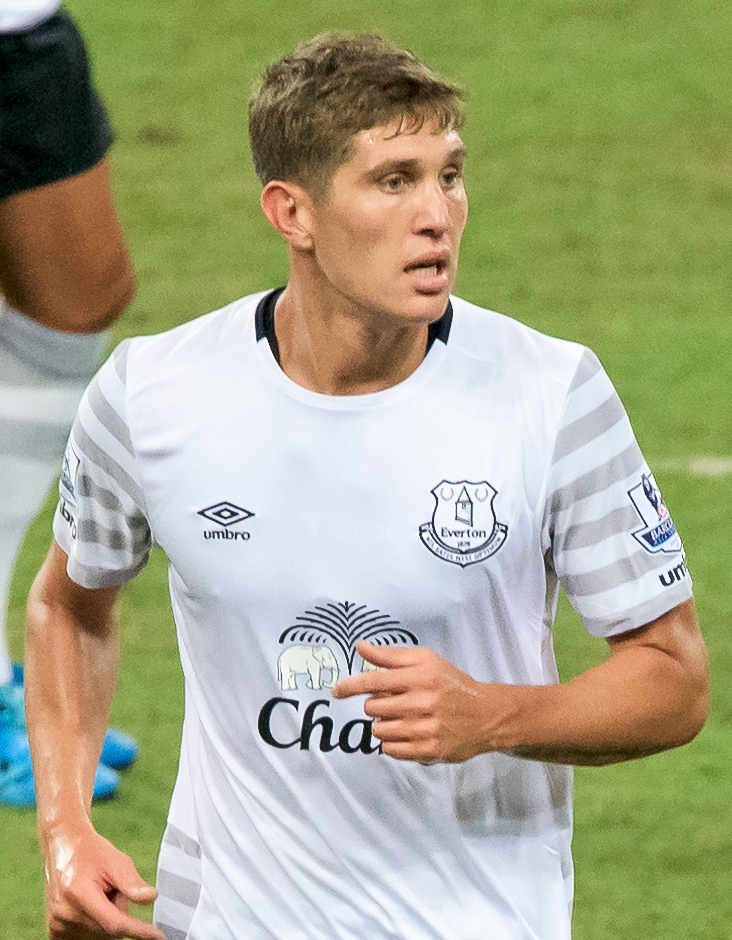
Stones playing for Everton in 2015

Stones signed a five-and-a-half-year contract with Everton on 31 January 2013, for a transfer fee reported to be in the region of £3 million. He was an unused substitute for three Premier League matches that season, beginning on 10 February in a 2–0 defeat to Manchester United at Old Trafford. Stones made his debut for Everton against Stevenage in the League Cup second round on 28 August 2013, a 2–1 win after extra time at Goodison Park. He made his league debut as a late substitute for Steven Naismith in a 1–0 home win over Chelsea on 14 September 2013. He started his first Premier League game for Everton in a 1–1 draw away to Stoke City on 1 January 2014.

On 7 August 2014, Stones signed a new five-year contract to keep him with Everton until 2019. He suffered an ankle injury against Manchester United on 5 October, ruling him out for between 10 and 14 weeks. Despite the injury, Stones was listed among the nominees for the Golden Boy 2014 Award alongside fellow Everton winger Gerard Deulofeu and fellow England internationals Calum Chambers, Luke Shaw and eventual winner Raheem Sterling.

Stones was sent off in Everton's 4–1 away win at Young Boys in the last 32 of the UEFA Europa League on 19 February 2015, for conceding a penalty kick with a foul on Guillaume Hoarau, who went on to miss the spot-kick. He scored his first goal for Everton in a 3–0 home win against Manchester United on 26 April 2015, heading in the team's second goal of the game. In July and August 2015, Stones was reportedly the subject of three bids from Chelsea – of £20 million, £26 million and £30 million – all of which were rejected by Everton. Stones was reported to have handed in a request to leave Everton, but this was also refused.

=== Manchester City ===
==== 2016–2018 ====
On 9 August 2016, Manchester City completed the signing of Stones for £47.5 million on a six-year contract with a potential extra £2.5 million in add-ons, making him the world's second most expensive defender in history, behind David Luiz. The announcement followed shortly after the leaking of his arrival, having been included in City's Champions League play-off round squad registration list which UEFA had published on their website prior to confirmation of the move. Through a 15% sell-on clause, Barnsley received £6.78 million from Stones' transfer to Manchester City, an amount larger than any transfer fee they had received in their history.

Stones made his debut for City four days later as they began the new season with a 2–1 home win over Sunderland, partnering Aleksandar Kolarov in Pep Guardiola's first competitive game in charge. On 6 January 2017, he scored his first goal for the Citizens, heading the last goal of a 5–0 win over West Ham United at London Stadium in the third round of the FA Cup. He scored again on 21 February to give them the lead in a 5–3 comeback win over Monaco in the last 16 of the UEFA Champions League, but after losing the tie on away goals he spoke of his disappointment with the team's defending. Stones was subject to criticism from the media for his performances over the season. In interviews at the end of the season, he said that he was disappointed to have not won any trophies and was keen to improve.

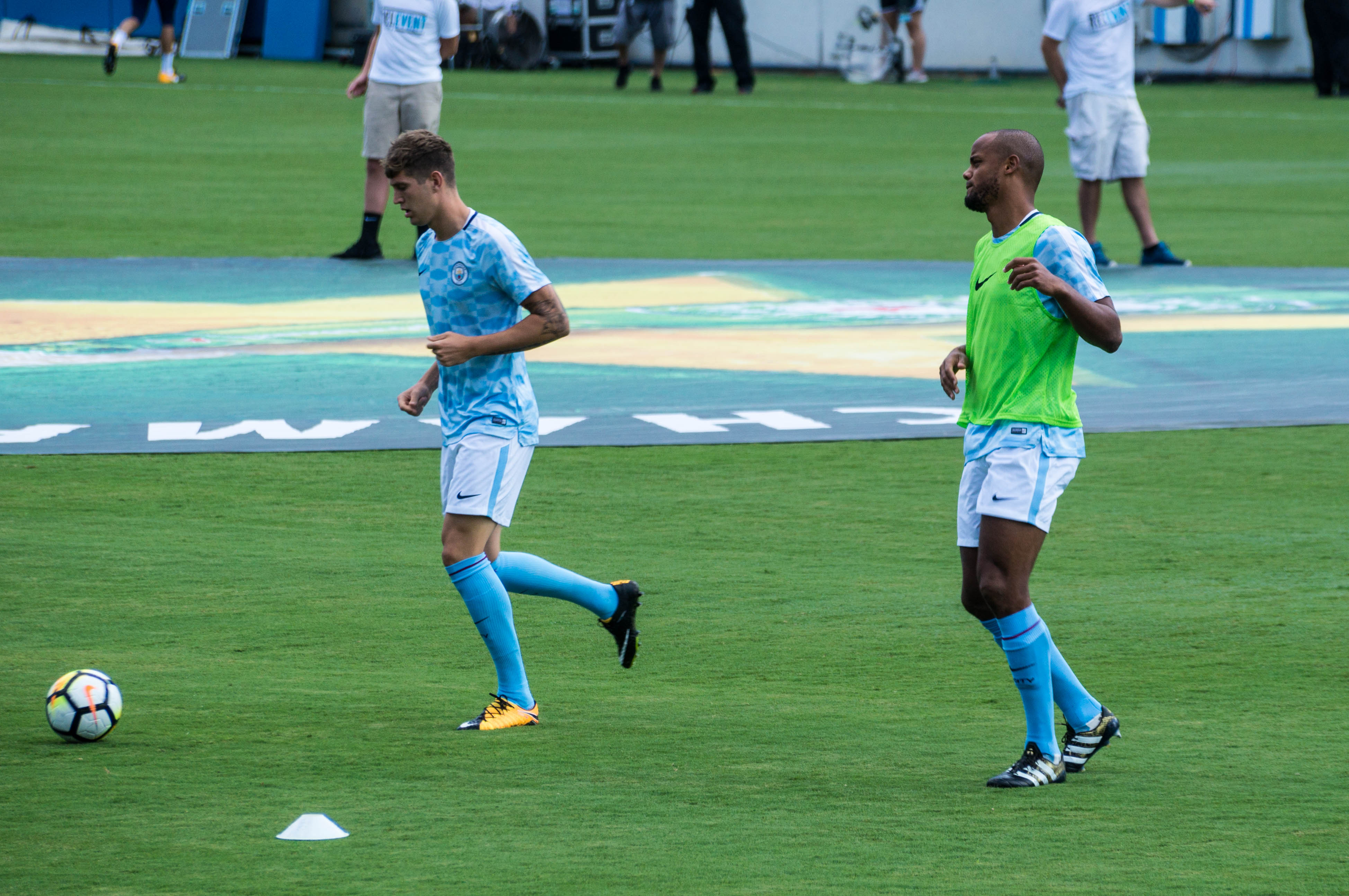
Stones (left) warming up for Manchester City in 2017

On 13 September 2017, Stones scored twice in a 4–0 Champions League group win away to Feyenoord, including a second-minute header that was City's fastest goal in the competition's history. He added another header on 1 November in a 4–2 win at Napoli that put his team into the last 16 with two games remaining. Seventeen days later, he withdrew after half an hour of the match away to Leicester City with a hamstring injury that ruled him out for the next six weeks. Stones suffered another injury in March 2018 while on international duty, and in April, Guardiola strongly denied press rumours that he was looking to sell the defender.

==== 2018–2023 ====
On 3 January 2019, in City's 2–1 victory over Liverpool, Stones made a crucial goal-line clearance which would end up being the decider in City's victory over Liverpool in the Premier League title race. In the summer of 2020, City signed centre-backs Rúben Dias and Nathan Aké, pushing Stones down the pecking order. Nevertheless, Guardiola stated that Stones would still be given "the chance to show his quality in this team".

On 6 January 2021, Stones scored the opening goal in a 2–0 away win at Old Trafford against Manchester United in the League Cup semi-final. He was named Man of the Match and was heavily praised by manager Pep Guardiola after an impressive streak of performances alongside Rúben Dias in defence. Just one day later, Stones was announced as the Manchester City Player of the Month for December 2020. On 17 January 2021, Stones scored his first and second Premier League goals for City, coming in a 4–0 home win over Crystal Palace. His performances earned him a place in the PFA Team of the Year for the 2020–21 season. On 10 August, Stones signed a new five-year contract with City, keeping him at the club until 2026.

In the 2022–23 season, Stones was converted from a centre-back to a defensive midfielder and found great success in this new position. On 14 March 2023, Stones was highly praised for his performance in a 7–0 win over RB Leipzig. On 17 May, Stones was a standout performer as Manchester City beat Real Madrid 4–0 at the Etihad Stadium in the second leg of the 2022–23 UEFA Champions League semi-finals, being described by Jamie Jackson of The Guardian as being in "Franz Beckenbauer mode". Manchester City were crowned champions of the Premier League once again in the 2022–23 season. On 3 June, Stones won the FA Cup final against Manchester United. On 10 June, Stones was in the starting line-up for the 2023 UEFA Champions League final against Inter Milan in Istanbul, which City went on to win 1–0 for their maiden European Cup. Stones was widely praised for his performance in the final and was named as Man of the Match by Manchester Evening News and by users of BBC Sport. He was selected in the 2022–23 UEFA Champions League team of the tournament. Stones was recognised by analysts as one of the most influential contributors to Manchester City's continental treble. He was also named in the Premier League PFA Team of the Year for his performances.

==== 2023–2026 ====
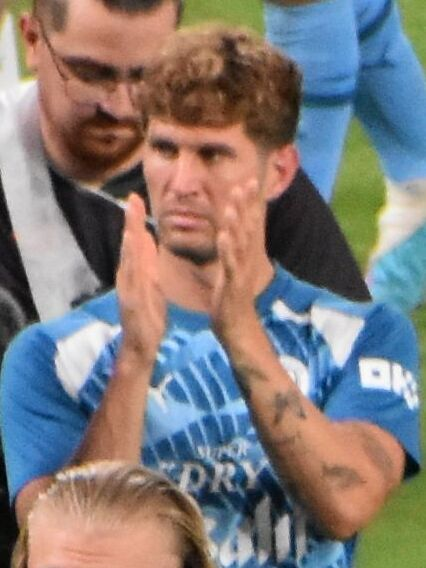
Stones with Manchester City in 2023

During the pre-season, ahead of the 2023–24 campaign, Stones suffered a muscle injury. On 16 August 2023, Stones was an unused substitute as City won the 2023 UEFA Super Cup after beating Sevilla 5–4 in a penalty shoot-out after a 1–1 extra-time draw.

On 28 April 2026, Stones announced that he would leave Manchester City when his contract expired in the summer.

=== Inter Milan ===
On 30 July 2026, Stones joined Serie A club Inter Milan on a free transfer, signing a two-year contract until 2028.

== International career ==
=== Youth ===
Stones was named in manager Peter Taylor's 21-man squad for the 2013 FIFA U-20 World Cup in May 2013. He made his England U20 debut on 16 June, in a 3–0 win in a warm-up game against Uruguay. He made his under-21s debut against Scotland on 13 August 2013, playing the entire 90 minutes of a 6–0 win for England at Bramall Lane.

=== Senior ===
==== 2014–2015: Beginnings ====
Stones was named as a standby player for England's 2014 FIFA World Cup squad, but was not included in the final squad. Stones made his England debut on 30 May in a 3–0 friendly win over Peru at Wembley, replacing Everton teammate Leighton Baines for the final 15 minutes. On 3 September 2014, Stones made his first England start in a friendly against Norway at Wembley Stadium. Five days later, in England's first match of UEFA Euro 2016 qualification, Stones made his competitive debut in a 2–0 victory away to Switzerland at St. Jakob-Park, Basel.

==== 2016–2019: First Euro, FIFA World Cup, and UEFA Nations League ====
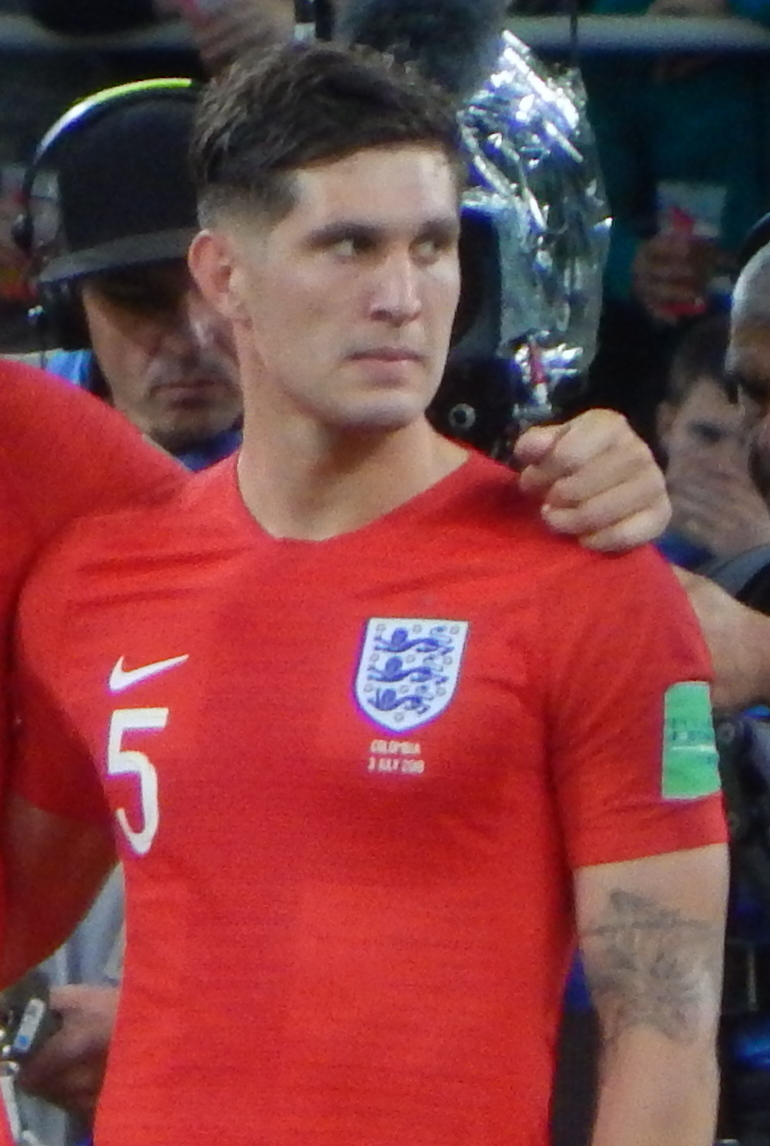
Stones playing for England at the 2018 FIFA World Cup

Stones was selected in Roy Hodgson's 23-man squad for Euro 2016 but did not play any of England's four games in the tournament. He was named in the 23-man England squad for the 2018 World Cup. On 24 June, Stones scored his first two international goals in a 6–1 victory over Panama during their second group stage match of the tournament. He became the first Manchester City player to score for England at a World Cup finals since Trevor Francis in 1982. At the 2019 UEFA Nations League Finals in Portugal, Stones made an error in the semi-final against the Netherlands, when he gave away possession to Memphis Depay in extra time, leading to one of the goals that defeated England 3–1. Manager Gareth Southgate dropped him from the third-place match against Switzerland, saying that Stones made his mistake because of fatigue.

==== 2020–2022: Second Euro and FIFA World Cup ====
Stones was named in the 26-man England squad for UEFA Euro 2020. He started all seven of England's games, with England finishing the tournament as runners-up and conceding only two goals, both from set pieces. Stones was also present in England's 26-man squad for the 2022 World Cup in Qatar, starting every one of England's five matches as they exited at the quarter-finals. Stones was seen as a key player for his national team across this period of time, forming a solid defensive partnership with then-Manchester United captain Harry Maguire, who featured alongside him at the 2018 World Cup and Euro 2020.

==== 2024: Third Euro and UEFA Nations League ====
Stones was named in England's squad for UEFA Euro 2024. Despite speculation regarding an illness, it was announced he had returned to training on 13 June 2024 ahead of their opening match against Serbia. He went on to play the full match against Serbia, partnering Marc Guéhi, who had replaced Maguire in the England team due to injury, in central defence, as England kept a clean sheet and won 1–0 in Gelsenkirchen. He was once again ever-present for England as they finished runners-up for the second successive European Championship.

On 9 October 2024, interim manager Lee Carsley announced that Stones would captain England for the first time for an upcoming UEFA Nations League home tie against Greece.

==== 2026 FIFA World Cup ====
On 22 May 2026, Stones was selected in the 26-man squad for the 2026 FIFA World Cup. Stones began the tournament in a first choice centre-back pairing with Ezri Konsa. Following the opening game with Croatia, in which England conceded two goals in a 4–2 victory, Stones was dropped to the bench. Following the last of 16 match against co-hosts Mexico at the Azteca Stadium, in which England were reduced to ten players after Jarell Quansah received a red card, Stones was brought on and praised for his performance after making several last ditch challenges in the eventual 3–2 victory. He featured in England's 2–1 defeat to defending Champions Argentina, where he was praised in the media for his performance, despite being beaten in the air by Lautaro Martínez, who headed in the match-winning goal in injury time; he was an unused substitute in the team's 6–4 victory over France in the third-place playoff.

== Style of play ==
Known for his technical ability and physical presence, Stones is known for being a ball-playing centre-back. Teammates and coaches have praised his composure with the ball, defensive skills, range of passing, and versatility and vision. Joleon Lescott has said of his ability: "John can do things most defenders can't – a little feign here and there, maybe a turn to get out of trouble when he needs to – and that's what is going to set him apart from others – the ability to do things others can't. He'll do his job and defend well, but there will be moments when he does something special and you'll just go 'ah, that's why he's regarded as the best.' He doesn't seem to get fazed by anything and always seems calm and he never hides". Former Manchester City and England teammate Kyle Walker added: "You don't quite appreciate him until you are playing alongside him. He rarely gets beat, he is great on the ball and he is very calm and level-headed."

Stones developed his ball-playing style early in his career at Barnsley with many crediting Manchester City coach Pep Guardiola for his later development. During the 2022–23 season, Stones began to play what was described as "a hybrid role: defending in the back four when City don't have the ball, and joining Rodri as a double pivot in front of City's back three when they are in possession". Stones' range of passing has led to comparisons to Rio Ferdinand, Gerard Piqué, Jérôme Boateng, Franz Beckenbauer, and Guardiola himself. Stones is often known as the Barnsley Busquets and the Barnsley Beckenbauer.

== Personal life ==
Stones met Millie Savage when both were aged 12. They split up in December 2018, when their daughter was 18 months old. In 2025, Stones married entrepreneur and businesswomen Olivia Stones née Naylor, the mother of his son (b.2023) at a private wedding ceremony held in Ibiza.

== Career statistics ==
=== Club ===
As of match played 14 September 2026

Appearances and goals by club, season and competition
Club	Season	League			National cup (Note: Includes FA Cup, Coppa Italia)		League cup (Note: Includes Football League/EFL Cup)		Europe		Other		Total	
Club	Season	Division	Apps	Goals	Apps	Goals	Apps	Goals	Apps	Goals	Apps	Goals	Apps	Goals
Barnsley	2010–11	Championship	0	0	0	0	0	0	—		—		0	0
Barnsley	2011–12	Championship	2	0	0	0	0	0	—		—		2	0
Barnsley	2012–13	Championship	22	0	2	0	2	1	—		—		26	1
Barnsley	Total		24	0	2	0	2	1	—		—		28	1
Everton	2012–13	Premier League	0	0	—		—		—		—		0	0
Everton	2013–14	Premier League	21	0	3	0	2	0	—		—		26	0
Everton	2014–15	Premier League	23	1	2	0	0	0	3 (Note: Appearances in UEFA Europa League)	0	—		28	1
Everton	2015–16	Premier League	33	0	2	0	6	0	—		—		41	0
Everton	Total		77	1	7	0	8	0	3	0	—		95	1
Manchester City	2016–17	Premier League	27	0	4	1	1	0	9 (Note: Appearance(s) in UEFA Champions League)	1	—		41	2
Manchester City	2017–18	Premier League	18	0	2	0	4	0	5	3	—		29	3
Manchester City	2018–19	Premier League	24	0	5	0	3	0	6	0	1 (Note: Appearance in FA Community Shield)	0	39	0
Manchester City	2019–20	Premier League	16	0	3	0	3	0	1	0	1	0	24	0
Manchester City	2020–21	Premier League	22	4	1	0	1	1	11	0	—		35	5
Manchester City	2021–22	Premier League	14	1	4	1	1	0	8	0	0	0	27	2
Manchester City	2022–23	Premier League	23	2	2	0	1	0	8	1	0	0	34	3
Manchester City	2023–24	Premier League	16	1	3	0	0	0	6	0	3 (Note: One appearance in FA Community Shield, two appearances in FIFA Club World Cup)	0	28	1
Manchester City	2024–25	Premier League	11	2	1	0	2	0	6	1	0	0	20	3
Manchester City	2025–26	Premier League	9	0	3	0	2	0	4	0	—		18	0
Manchester City	Total		180	10	28	2	18	1	64	6	5	0	295	19
Inter Milan	2026–27	Serie A	3	0	0	0	—		1	0	0	0	4	0
Career total			284	11	37	2	28	2	68	6	5	0	422	21

=== International ===
As of match played 15 July 2026

Appearances and goals by national team and year
National team	Year	Apps	Goals
England	2014	4	0
England	2015	3	0
England	2016	8	0
England	2017	7	0
England	2018	15	2
England	2019	2	0
England	2021	16	1
England	2022	9	0
England	2023	5	0
England	2024	14	0
England	2025	4	0
England	2026	7	0
Total		94	3

As of match played 15 July 2026
England score listed first, score column indicates score after each Stones goal

List of international goals scored by John Stones
No.	Date	Venue	Cap	Opponent	Score	Result	Competition	Ref.
1	24 June 2018	Nizhny Novgorod Stadium, Nizhny Novgorod, Russia	28	Panama	1–0	6–1	2018 FIFA World Cup	
2	24 June 2018	Nizhny Novgorod Stadium, Nizhny Novgorod, Russia	28	Panama	4–0	6–1	2018 FIFA World Cup	
3	12 October 2021	Wembley Stadium, London, England	53	Hungary	1–1	1–1	2022 FIFA World Cup qualification	

== Honours ==
Manchester City

- Premier League: 2017–18, 2018–19, 2020–21, 2021–22, 2022–23, 2023–24
- FA Cup: 2018–19, 2022–23, 2025–26; runner-up: 2023–24, 2024–25
- EFL Cup: 2017–18, 2018–19, 2019–20, 2020–21, 2025–26
- FA Community Shield: 2018, 2019,
- UEFA Champions League: 2022–23; runner-up: 2020–21
- UEFA Super Cup: 2023
- FIFA Club World Cup: 2023

England

- UEFA European Championship runner-up: 2020, 2024
- FIFA World Cup third place: 2026
- UEFA Nations League third place: 2018–19

Individual

- PFA Team of the Year: 2020–21 Premier League, 2022–23 Premier League
- ESM Team of the Year: 2020–21
- Everton Young Player of the Season: 2014–15
- UEFA Champions League Team of the Season: 2022–23
- FIFPRO Men's World 11: 2023
