= 2023 FA Cup final =

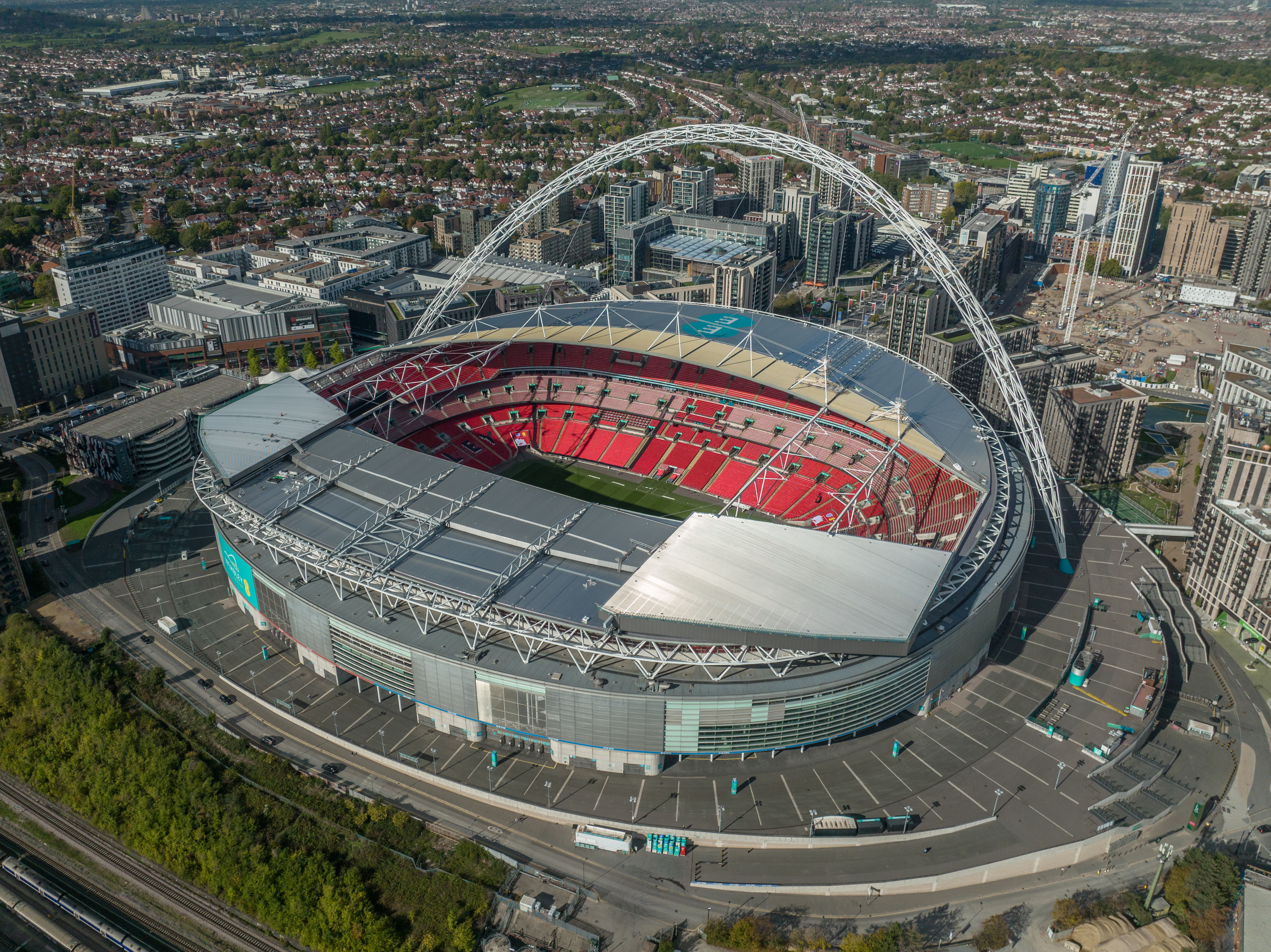
- The match took place at Wembley Stadium
- Event: 2022–23 FA Cup
Manchester City	Manchester United
2	1
- Date: 3 June 2023
- Venue: Wembley Stadium, London
- Man of the Match: İlkay Gündoğan (Manchester City)
- Referee: Paul Tierney (Lancashire)
- Attendance: 83,179
- Weather: Partly cloudy

The 2023 FA Cup final was the final match of the 2022–23 FA Cup, the 142nd season of the oldest football tournament in the world, the Football Association Challenge Cup. It was played at Wembley Stadium in London on 3 June 2023 between Manchester City and Manchester United, making it the first time the Manchester derby was contested in a cup final.

Manchester City won the match 2–1 for their seventh FA Cup title and second double. İlkay Gündoğan broke the record for the fastest goal ever in an FA Cup final, scoring after just 12 seconds.

As winners Manchester City qualified for the UEFA Champions League tournament via their position in the 2022–23 Premier League, the 2023–24 UEFA Europa League position went to the sixth-placed Premier League team (Brighton & Hove Albion), while the 2023–24 UEFA Europa Conference League play-off round spot allocated to the team that finished sixth in the Premier League was awarded to the seventh-placed team (Aston Villa).

As winners of both the Premier League and FA Cup, Manchester City qualified for the 2023 FA Community Shield, which they lost on penalties to Premier League runners-up Arsenal.

== Background ==
The 2023 final marked the 100th anniversary of the first FA Cup final to be played at the original Wembley Stadium, the venue replaced by the current stadium in 2007. It was Manchester United's 21st appearance in the FA Cup final, tying the record set by Arsenal on their last appearance in 2020, and their first since 2018. Manchester City made their 12th FA Cup final appearance and their first since 2019.

It was the first time that the two Manchester clubs met in the FA Cup final, but the tenth such meeting at any stage of the competition and the 190th Manchester derby in total. The two clubs split the results between them in the Premier League during the season; City won the first match 6–3 at the City of Manchester Stadium in October 2022, while United won 2–1 at Old Trafford in January 2023.

Manchester City were seeking to win the continental treble of the Premier League, FA Cup and UEFA Champions League, attempting to emulate the feat managed by Manchester United in 1998–99; they faced Inter Milan in the 2023 UEFA Champions League final a week after the FA Cup final, winning 1–0 and completing the treble. Manchester United were looking to secure their second trophy under manager Erik ten Hag, having won the EFL Cup in February 2023, aiming for their first ever domestic cup double. They also had once successfully denied an opponent of a continental treble chase before – in 1977 at the expense of Liverpool.

A UK-wide train strike took place on the day of the final.

== Route to the final ==
Manchester City		Round	Manchester United	
Opposition	Score	Round	Opposition	Score
Chelsea (H)	4–0	3rd	Everton (H)	3–1
Arsenal (H)	1–0	4th	Reading (H)	3–1
Bristol City (A)	3–0	5th	West Ham United (H)	3–1
Burnley (H)	6–0	QF	Fulham (H)	3–1
Sheffield United (N)	3–0	SF	Brighton & Hove Albion (N)	0–0 (a.e.t.) (7–6 p)
Key: (H) = Home venue; (A) = Away venue; (N) = Neutral venue

As Premier League clubs, both Manchester City and Manchester United entered the FA Cup in the third round. City began with a 4–0 home victory over 2022 finalists Chelsea at the City of Manchester Stadium, while United beat Everton 3–1 at Old Trafford. In the fourth round, City again played at home, where they beat 14-time FA Cup winners Arsenal 1–0. United also faced another home tie in the fourth round, claiming another 3–1 victory over Reading. They managed yet another 3–1 home win in the fifth round, this time against West Ham United, while City beat Bristol City 3–0 at Ashton Gate Stadium.

In the quarter-finals, Manchester City returned to the City of Manchester Stadium, where they recorded a 6–0 win over Burnley, while United won 3–1 at Old Trafford for the fourth game in a row, Fulham this time the team on the receiving end. The semi-finals were both played at Wembley Stadium, with City facing Sheffield United on 22 April and United taking on Brighton & Hove Albion the next day. City won their tie 3–0, while United and Brighton played out a goalless draw after extra time that had to be decided on penalties; United won the shoot-out 7–6.

== Match ==
=== Summary ===
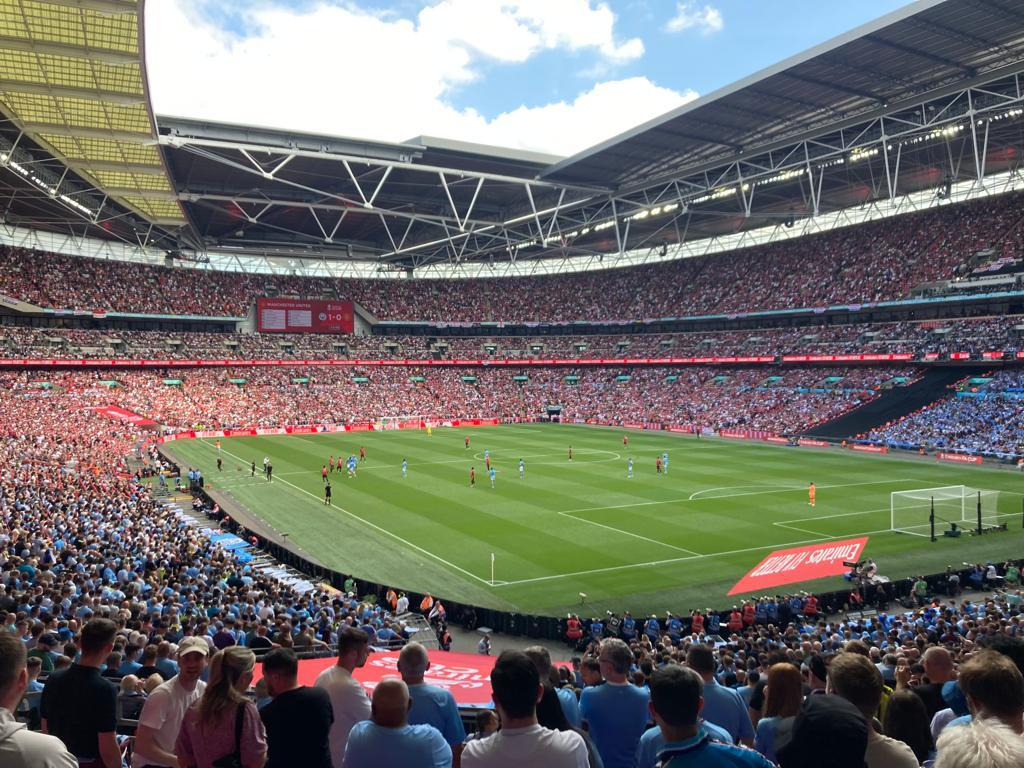
The Wembley Stadium during the 2023 FA Cup final between Manchester City and Manchester United

==== First half ====
Just 12 seconds into the match, İlkay Gündoğan opened the scoring for Manchester City with a right-footed volley from just outside the penalty area, making it the fastest goal in FA Cup Final history. The previous fastest goal was Louis Saha's in the 2009 final for Everton which came after 25 seconds. City pushed for a second goal soon after, as a free-kick into the United penalty area by Kevin De Bruyne was narrowly headed wide by Rodri. Erling Haaland also had a chance to double City's lead, but an effort from him ended up drifting over the goal. United soon began to develop a spell of possession themselves, and they were rewarded for their forays into the City half as the VAR concluded that the ball had struck Jack Grealish's hand inside the penalty area. Bruno Fernandes converted the penalty for United, to make it 1–1 after 33 minutes. United did not let up in their spell of dominance in the final minutes of the first half, as Raphaël Varane had a chance from a corner to slot the ball into the net but hit his effort over the bar.

==== Second half ====
In the 51st minute, De Bruyne whipped in a free-kick towards the United penalty area which fell to Gündoğan from just outside the area who then struck the ball first time with his left foot into the bottom left hand corner of the net, with David de Gea unable to keep out, for his second of the match and regain City's lead early in the second half. City kept up their pressure on United as the second half progressed, as De Bruyne found himself with a good chance running towards goal but his resulting effort was saved by de Gea's foot. United then began to pile more pressure themselves, as an effort from just outside the City penalty area from Marcus Rashford flew over the bar. At the other end of the field, City thought they had scored a third after an effort from Haaland was saved by de Gea before Gündoğan put the ball in the net from the rebound for what would have been his hat-trick. However, the goal was immediately disallowed by the referee after Gündoğan was shown to have been in an offside position when Haaland tried the initial shot. City did come close again to scoring a third, as a ball across the face of the United goal from Bernardo Silva was nearly tapped in at the back post by Manuel Akanji. Into the latter stages of the match, United's desperate search for an equaliser nearly earned them a goal as Alejandro Garnacho fired narrowly wide of the far post from the left hand side of the penalty area, before substitute Scott McTominay controlled the ball down inside the City penalty area, where Varane attempted to slot the ball into the net but was thwarted by Stefan Ortega. The ball bounced up off the crossbar, and was headed narrowly over courtesy of desperate defending from City. The match ended after six minutes of stoppage time, with City winning 2–1.

=== Details ===
Because the match was deemed "high risk" by the police, it was moved to a 15:00 start, the first FA Cup final to kick-off at that time since 2011.

3 June 2023
15:00 BST

Manchester City	2–1	Manchester United
Gündoğan 1', 51'	Report	Fernandes 33' (pen.)

Wembley Stadium, London
Attendance: 83,179
Referee: Paul Tierney (Lancashire)

Manchester City	Manchester United

GK	18	(Germany) Stefan Ortega	(yellow card) 81'
CB	2	(England) Kyle Walker		(substituted off) 90+5'
CB	3	(Portugal) Rúben Dias
CB	25	(Switzerland) Manuel Akanji
DM	5	(England) John Stones
DM	16	(Spain) Rodri	(yellow card) 90'
RW	20	(Portugal) Bernardo Silva
AM	17	(Belgium) Kevin De Bruyne		(substituted off) 76'
AM	8	(Germany) İlkay Gündoğan (c)
LW	10	(England) Jack Grealish		(substituted off) 89'
CF	9	(Norway) Erling Haaland
Substitutes:
GK	31	(Brazil) Ederson
DF	6	(Netherlands) Nathan Aké		(substituted on) 89'
DF	14	(Spain) Aymeric Laporte		(substituted on) 90+5'
DF	82	(England) Rico Lewis
MF	4	(England) Kalvin Phillips
MF	47	(England) Phil Foden		(substituted on) 76'
MF	80	(England) Cole Palmer
FW	19	(Argentina) Julián Álvarez
FW	26	(Algeria) Riyad Mahrez
Manager:
(Spain) Pep Guardiola

GK	1	(Spain) David de Gea
RB	29	(England) Aaron Wan-Bissaka	(yellow card) 45+4'
CB	19	(France) Raphaël Varane
CB	2	(Sweden) Victor Lindelöf		(substituted off) 83'
LB	23	(England) Luke Shaw
CM	18	(Brazil) Casemiro
CM	17	(Brazil) Fred	(yellow card) 79'
RW	8	(Portugal) Bruno Fernandes (c)
AM	14	(Denmark) Christian Eriksen		(substituted off) 62'
LW	25	(England) Jadon Sancho		(substituted off) 78'
CF	10	(England) Marcus Rashford
Substitutes:
GK	31	(England) Jack Butland
DF	5	(England) Harry Maguire
DF	12	(Netherlands) Tyrell Malacia
DF	20	(Portugal) Diogo Dalot
MF	39	(Scotland) Scott McTominay		(substituted on) 83'
FW	27	(Netherlands) Wout Weghorst		(substituted on) 78'
FW	28	(Uruguay) Facundo Pellistri
FW	36	(Sweden) Anthony Elanga
FW	49	(Argentina) Alejandro Garnacho		(substituted on) 62'
Manager:
(Netherlands) Erik ten Hag

Man of the Match:
İlkay Gündoğan (Manchester City)

Assistant referees:
Neil Davies (London)
Scott Ledger (South Yorkshire)
Fourth official:
Peter Bankes (Merseyside)
Reserve assistant referee:
Adrian Holmes (West Yorkshire)
Video assistant referee:
David Coote (Nottinghamshire)
Assistant video assistant referee:
Simon Long (Cornwall)

Match rules

- 90 minutes
- 30 minutes of extra time if necessary
- Penalty shoot-out if scores still level
- Nine named substitutes
- Maximum of five substitutions, with a sixth allowed in extra time (Note: Each team was given only three opportunities to make substitutions, with a fourth opportunity in extra time, excluding substitutions made at half-time, before the start of extra time and at half-time in extra time.)
