= 2023 UEFA Champions League final =

Football match in Istanbul, Turkey

- Match programme cover
- Event: 2022–23 UEFA Champions League
| Manchester City | Inter Milan |
| (The Football Association) | (Italian Football Federation) |
| 1 | 0 |
- Date: 10 June 2023
- Venue: Atatürk Olympic Stadium, Istanbul
- Man of the Match: Rodri (Manchester City)
- Referee: Szymon Marciniak (Poland)
- Attendance: 71,412
- Weather: Clear night 21 °C (70 °F); 54% humidity

The 2023 UEFA Champions League final was the final match of the 2022–23 UEFA Champions League, the 68th season of Europe's premier club football tournament organised by UEFA. It was played at the Atatürk Olympic Stadium in Istanbul, Turkey, on 10 June 2023, between English club Manchester City and Italian club Inter Milan, with Manchester City winning 1–0 via a second-half goal by Rodri, who was named man of the match by UEFA. For Manchester City, this was their first-ever European Cup, and first European trophy since 1970. Having earlier won the Premier League and FA Cup titles, they achieved the continental treble, only the second time it had been achieved in English men's football history. As winners, Manchester City earned the right to play against Sevilla, the winners of the 2022–23 UEFA Europa League, in the 2023 UEFA Super Cup, as well as qualifying for the 2023 FIFA Club World Cup; they went on to win both competitions. They also qualified for the 2025 FIFA Club World Cup through UEFA's champions pathway (winners of the 2021–2024 Champions Leagues).

The final was originally scheduled to be played at Wembley Stadium in London, England. However, due to the postponement and relocation of the 2020 final because of the COVID-19 pandemic, the scheduled hosts for subsequent finals were shifted back a year, and the Allianz Arena in Munich was assigned the 2023 final. When the 2021 final, which had been scheduled to be played in Istanbul, also had to be relocated due to the impact of the COVID-19 pandemic, the 2023 final was given to Istanbul instead, and Munich received the 2025 final.

== Background ==
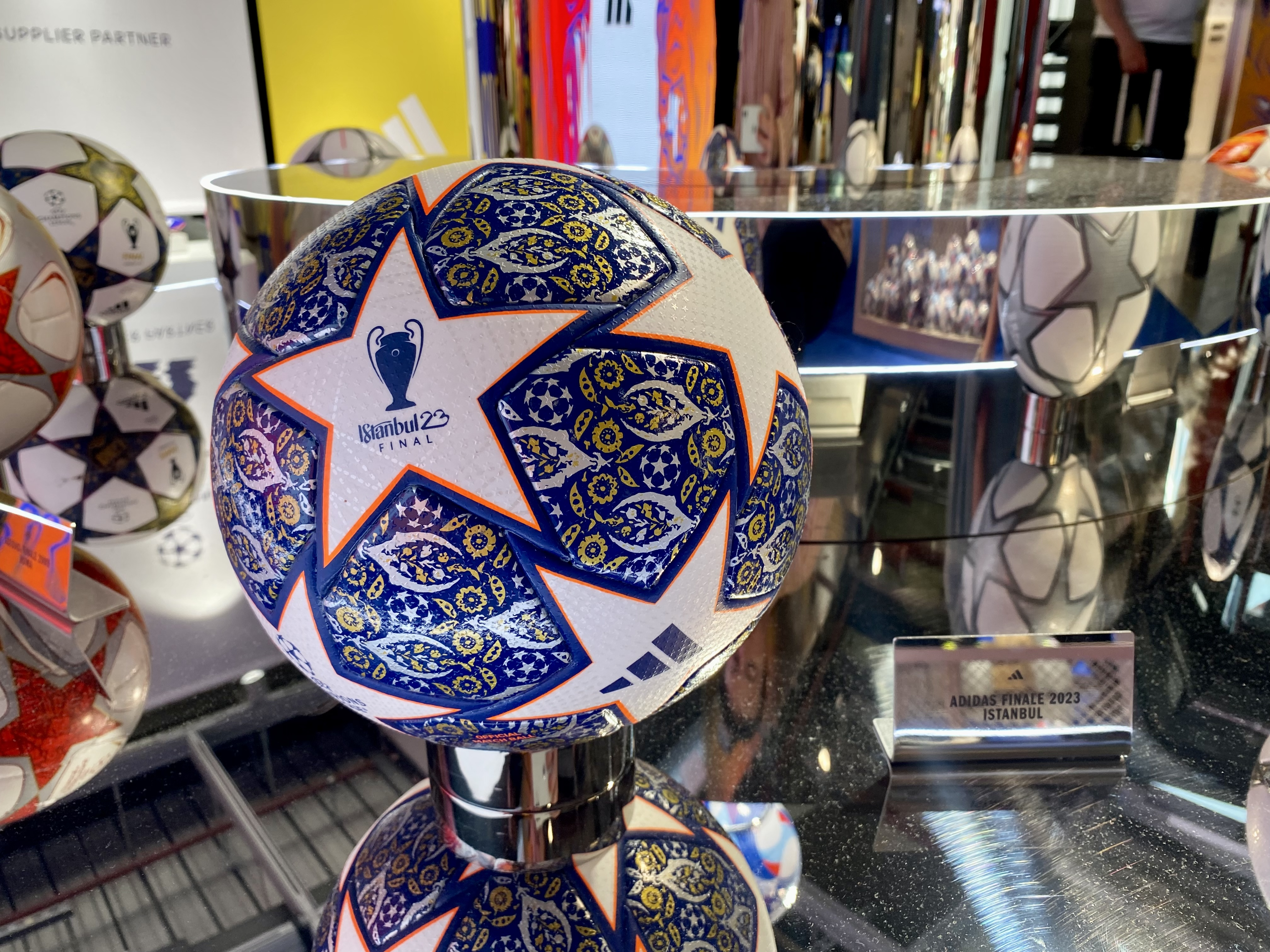
An example of the Adidas balls used in the final on display in London in 2024.

For Manchester City, this was their third European final and second European Cup/Champions League final appearance; they won the 1970 European Cup Winners' Cup final but lost the 2021 UEFA Champions League final 1–0 to Chelsea, who were the most recent new European champions, having won in 2012. Manager Pep Guardiola was looking to win his third UEFA Champions League title and the first since 2011 with former employers Barcelona, when they beat Manchester United 3–1 at Wembley Stadium. He was also aiming to become the first manager to win two European trebles, having done so with Barcelona in 2008–09. Additionally, Manchester City were attempting to secure the continental treble, having earlier won the Premier League and FA Cup. After West Ham United's triumph in the 2023 UEFA Europa Conference League final three days earlier, they became the English team with the longest European major trophy drought—53 years since their latest triumph.

On the other hand, this was Inter Milan's twelfth European final and sixth European Cup/Champions League final appearance, having won 3–1 in 1964 against Real Madrid, 1–0 against Benfica at home in 1965, and 2–0 against Bayern Munich in 2010, resulting in Inter completing the continental treble; they also lost 2–1 to Celtic in 1967 and 2–0 to Ajax in 1972, enabling those clubs to win the continental treble themselves. The club had also contested five UEFA Cup/UEFA Europa League finals, winning in 1991, 1994, and 1998 as well as losing in 1997 and 2020. They also contested the 2010 UEFA Super Cup, losing 2–0 to Atlético Madrid. Inter was also the most recent Italian club to win the Champions League; since 2010 only one other Italian club—Juventus—had reached the Champions League final, losing in 2015 and 2017. Having won the 2023 Coppa Italia final against Fiorentina, Inter were attempting to win a cup double. Manager Simone Inzaghi was aiming for his first European title as manager and the second in his football career, having won against Manchester United in the 1999 UEFA Super Cup as a Lazio player. Their midfielder Henrikh Mkhitaryan was aiming to become the 11th player to have won all three major European trophies and the first to have achieved that with three different clubs, having won the 2016–17 UEFA Europa League with Manchester United and the 2021–22 UEFA Europa Conference League with Roma.

This was the first meeting in UEFA competitions between City and Inter. City had won six matches against Italian clubs, while Inter had won 16 matches against English clubs.

=== Previous finals ===
In the following table, finals until 1992 were in the European Cup era and since 1993 were in the UEFA Champions League era.

| Team | Previous final appearances (bold indicates winners) |
|---|---|
| (The Football Association) Manchester City | 1 (2021) |
| (Italian Football Federation) Inter Milan | 5 (**1964**, **1965**, 1967, 1972, **2010**) |

== Venue ==
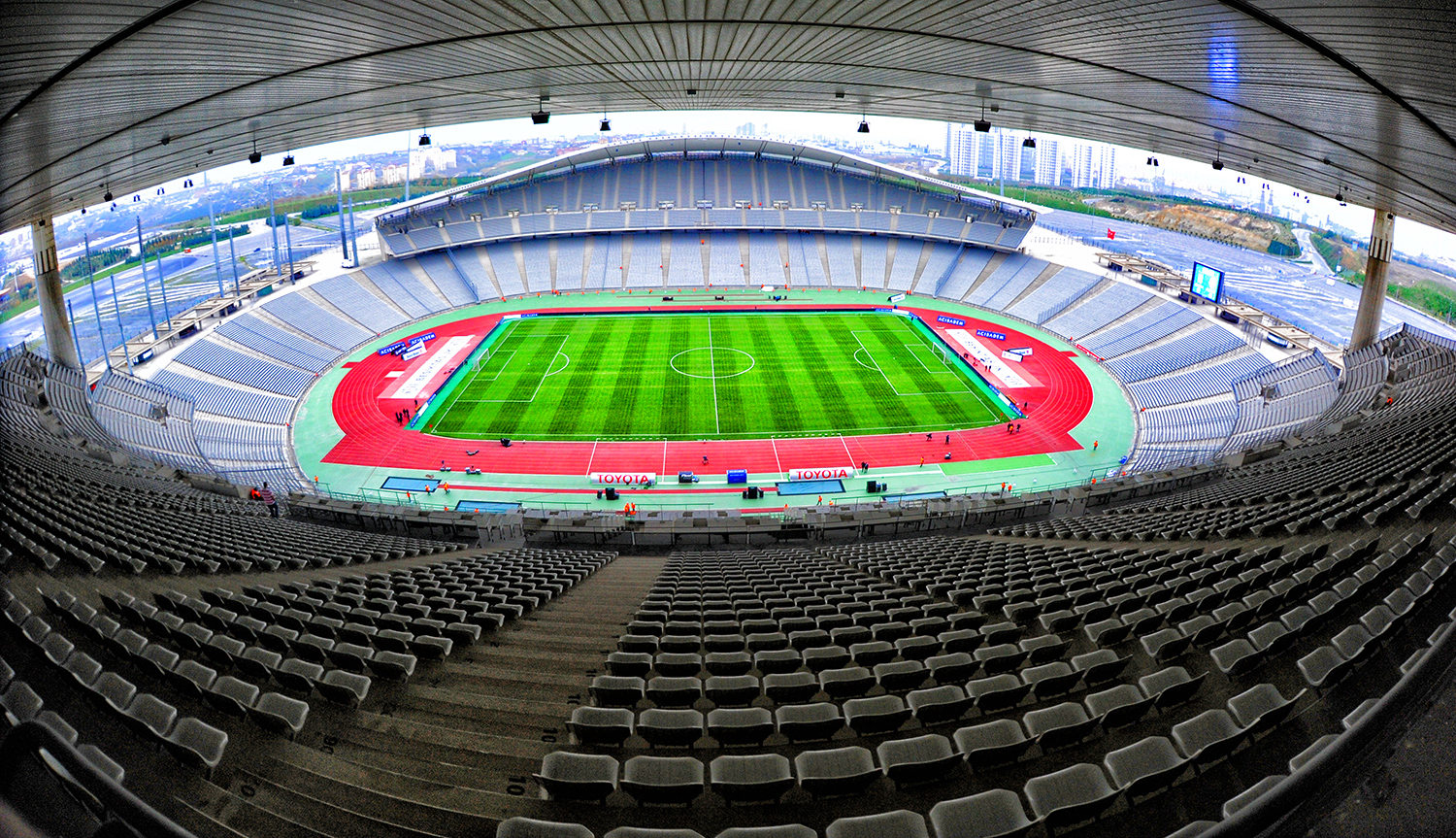
The Atatürk Olympic Stadium in Istanbul hosted the final.

This was the second UEFA Champions League final played at the Atatürk Olympic Stadium; the first was held in 2005, when Liverpool secured their fifth title after defeating Milan on penalties.

=== Host selection ===
An open bidding process was launched on 22 February 2019 by UEFA to select the 2022 and 2023 UEFA Champions League final venues. National associations had until 22 March 2019 to express interest, and bid dossiers had to be submitted by 1 July 2019.

While the bidding associations were not confirmed by UEFA, the German Football Association was reported to have bid with the Allianz Arena in Munich, should they not be awarded the 2021 final. The Allianz Arena was selected by the UEFA Executive Committee during their meeting in Ljubljana, Slovenia, on 24 September 2019, where the hosts for the 2021 and 2022 finals were also appointed.

On 17 June 2020, the UEFA Executive Committee announced that due to the postponement and relocation of the 2020 final due to the impact of the COVID-19 pandemic, Munich would instead host the 2023 edition. Istanbul had initially been appointed for the 2021 final, but after it was relocated due to the COVID-19 pandemic, they were awarded the 2023 final; Munich would host the 2025 final instead.

== Route to the final ==
Note: In all results below, the score of the finalist is given first (H: home; A: away).

| (The Football Association) Manchester City | | | | Round | (Italian Football Federation) Inter Milan | | | |
|---|---|---|---|---|---|---|---|---|
| Opponent | Result | | | Group stage | Opponent | Result | | |
| (Royal Spanish Football Federation) Sevilla | 4–0 (A) | | | Matchday 1 | (German Football Association) Bayern Munich | 0–2 (H) | | |
| (German Football Association) Borussia Dortmund | 2–1 (H) | | | Matchday 2 | (Football Association of the Czech Republic) Viktoria Plzeň | 2–0 (A) | | |
| (Danish Football Association) Copenhagen | 5–0 (H) | | | Matchday 3 | (Royal Spanish Football Federation) Barcelona | 1–0 (H) | | |
| (Danish Football Association) Copenhagen | 0–0 (A) | | | Matchday 4 | (Royal Spanish Football Federation) Barcelona | 3–3 (A) | | |
| (German Football Association) Borussia Dortmund | 0–0 (A) | | | Matchday 5 | (Football Association of the Czech Republic) Viktoria Plzeň | 4–0 (H) | | |
| (Royal Spanish Football Federation) Sevilla | 3–1 (H) | | | Matchday 6 | (German Football Association) Bayern Munich | 0–2 (A) | | |
| Group G winners: Pos / Team / Pld / Pts; 1 / (England) Manchester City / 6 / 14; 2 / (Germany) Borussia Dortmund / 6 / 9; 3 / (Spain) Sevilla / 6 / 5; 4 / (Denmark) Copenhagen / 6 / 3; Source: UEFA | | | | Final standings | Group C runners-up: Pos / Team / Pld / Pts; 1 / (Germany) Bayern Munich / 6 / 18; 2 / (Italy) Inter Milan / 6 / 10; 3 / (Spain) Barcelona / 6 / 7; 4 / (Czech Republic) Viktoria Plzeň / 6 / 0; Source: UEFA | | | |
| Opponent | Agg. | 1st leg | 2nd leg | Knockout phase | Opponent | Agg. | 1st leg | 2nd leg |
| (German Football Association) RB Leipzig | 8–1 | 1–1 (A) | 7–0 (H) | Round of 16 | (Portuguese Football Federation) Porto | 1–0 | 1–0 (H) | 0–0 (A) |
| (German Football Association) Bayern Munich | 4–1 | 3–0 (H) | 1–1 (A) | Quarter-finals | (Portuguese Football Federation) Benfica | 5–3 | 2–0 (A) | 3–3 (H) |
| (Royal Spanish Football Federation) Real Madrid | 5–1 | 1–1 (A) | 4–0 (H) | Semi-finals | (Italian Football Federation) Milan | 3–0 | 2–0 (A) | 1–0 (H) |

=== Manchester City ===
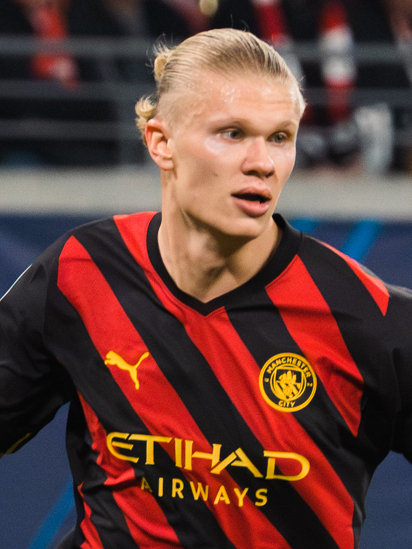
Erling Haaland, who joined Manchester City at the beginning of the 2022–23 season from Borussia Dortmund, was the top scorer in the competition with 12 goals en route to the final.

Manchester City qualified for the Champions League group stage by winning the 2021–22 Premier League. In the group stage, they were drawn into Group G, alongside Bundesliga runners-up Borussia Dortmund, La Liga fourth-place team Sevilla and Danish Superliga champions Copenhagen.

In City's opener of the group stage, they faced Sevilla at the Ramón Sánchez Pizjuán and won 4–0, with goals from Phil Foden, Rúben Dias and a brace from Erling Haaland. On matchday 2, City won 2–1 at the City of Manchester Stadium against Borussia Dortmund, with goals from John Stones and Erling Haaland. On matchday 3, City defeated Copenhagen at home 5–0, with goals from Riyad Mahrez, Julián Álvarez, a brace from Erling Haaland and an own goal from Davit Khocholava. On matchday 4, City drew in Copenhagen 0–0. On matchday 5, City drew against Borussia Dortmund at the Westfalenstadion 0–0. On matchday 6, at the City of Manchester Stadium, the hosts defeated Sevilla 3–1, with goals from Rico Lewis, Julian Álvarez and Riyad Mahrez.

In the round of 16, City were drawn against German club RB Leipzig. In the first leg held at the Red Bull Arena, City drew 1–1, with goals from Riyad Mahrez and Joško Gvardiol. In the reverse leg, City defeated Leipzig 7–0, with five goals from Erling Haaland, tying a Champions League single game goals record, and one goal each from İlkay Gündoğan and Kevin De Bruyne, to win 8–1 on aggregate and advance to the quarter-finals.

In the quarter-finals, City were drawn against German champions Bayern Munich. In the first leg, at the City of Manchester Stadium, the hosts won 3–0, with goals from Rodri, Bernardo Silva and Erling Haaland. In the second leg, at the Allianz Arena, City drew 1–1, with goals from Erling Haaland and Joshua Kimmich, winning 4–1 on aggregate and qualifying for the semi-finals.

In the semi-finals, City were drawn against Spanish champions and reigning UEFA Champions League winners Real Madrid, making it a rematch of the last season's tie at the same stage, which Madrid won 6–5 on aggregate after extra time. In the first leg, at the Santiago Bernabéu, City and Real drew, with a first-half goal by Vinícius Júnior matched by a Kevin De Bruyne equaliser. In the second leg, at the City of Manchester Stadium, the hosts won 4–0, with a brace from Bernardo Silva and goals by Manuel Akanji and Julián Álvarez. City won 5–1 on aggregate to qualify for their second Champions League final in three years.

=== Inter Milan ===
Inter Milan qualified for the Champions League group stage by finishing as runners-up in the 2021–22 Serie A. In the group stage, they were drawn into Group C alongside Bundesliga champions Bayern Munich, La Liga runners-up Barcelona and Czech First League champions Viktoria Plzeň.

In the opening match of the group stage, Inter faced Bayern Munich at the San Siro and lost 0–2, with goals for Bayern from Leroy Sané and an own goal by Danilo D'Ambrosio. On matchday 2, Inter won 2–0 against Viktoria Plzeň at the Doosan Arena, with goals from Edin Džeko and Denzel Dumfries. On matchday 3, Inter returned to the San Siro and won 1–0 against Barcelona, with the only goal of the match coming from Hakan Çalhanoğlu. On matchday 4, Inter drew 3–3 with Barcelona at the Camp Nou, with Nicolò Barella, Lautaro Martínez and Robin Gosens scoring for Inter, and Robert Lewandowski (twice) and Ousmane Dembélé scoring for the hosts. On matchday 5, Inter won 4–0 against Viktoria Plzeň at the San Siro, with goals from Henrikh Mkhitaryan, Džeko and Romelu Lukaku, sealing qualification to the knockout phase. On matchday 6, Inter lost 2–0 to Bayern Munich at the Allianz Arena, with goals from Benjamin Pavard and Eric Maxim Choupo-Moting.

In the round of 16, Inter were drawn against Portuguese club Porto. In the first leg held at the San Siro, Inter won 1–0, with a goal from Lukaku. In the reverse leg at the Estádio do Dragão, Inter drew 0–0 to seal a 1–0 aggregate victory and qualify for the quarter-finals.

In the quarter-finals, Inter were drawn against another Portuguese club, Benfica. In the first leg at the Estádio da Luz, Inter won 2–0, with goals from Barella and a penalty kick from Lukaku. In the second leg at the San Siro, Inter drew 3–3, with goals from Barella, Martínez and Joaquín Correa for Inter, and Fredrik Aursnes, António Silva and Petar Musa for the visitors, winning 5–3 on aggregate and sealing semi-finals qualification.

In the semi-finals, Inter were drawn against local rivals Milan, their first meeting in European competition since 2005, with both legs being held at the San Siro. In the 'away' leg, Inter won 2–0, with goals from Džeko and Mkhitaryan. In the home leg, Inter won 1–0, with the only goal of the match coming from Martínez, qualifying Inter for the final with a 3–0 aggregate victory. It was the club's sixth European Cup final appearance and their first since 2010, when José Mourinho was manager.

== Pre-match ==
=== Identity ===
The visual identity of the 2023 UEFA Champions League final was unveiled at the group stage draw in Istanbul on 25 August 2022.

=== Officials ===
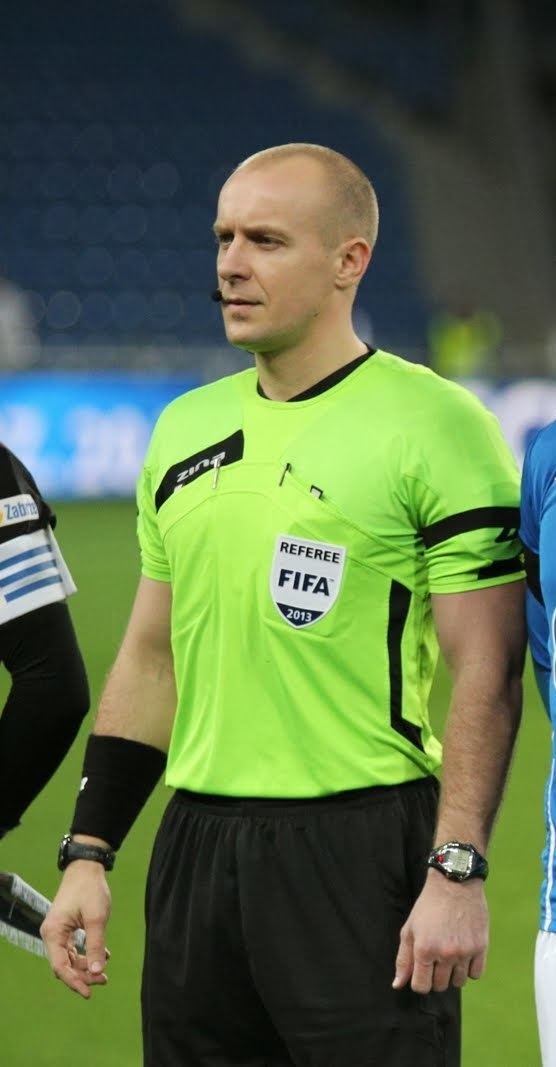
Polish referee Szymon Marciniak officiated the final.

On 22 May 2023, Polish referee Szymon Marciniak was appointed to take charge of the final by UEFA, along with fellow Poles: Paweł Sokolnicki and Tomasz Listkiewicz as assistant referees and Tomasz Kwiatkowski as the video assistant referee. The four officials had all previously officiated together in the World Cup final six months prior. They were joined by fellow countryman Bartosz Frankowski as assistant VAR, with Romanian István Kovács appointed as the fourth official. Some controversy regarding the appointment was raised in early June due to multiple media reports that Marciniak had been present at an event organised by Sławomir Mentzen, a right-wing Polish politician and leader of the libertarian New Hope party. UEFA investigated the incident and subsequently decided to maintain the original refereeing line-up on 2 June, having acknowledged Marciniak's "profound apologies and clarification".

=== Ambassador ===
The ambassador for the final was former Turkish international Hamit Altıntop, who was originally the ambassador for 2020 and 2021 finals before those matches were relocated to Lisbon and Porto, respectively.

=== Opening ceremony ===
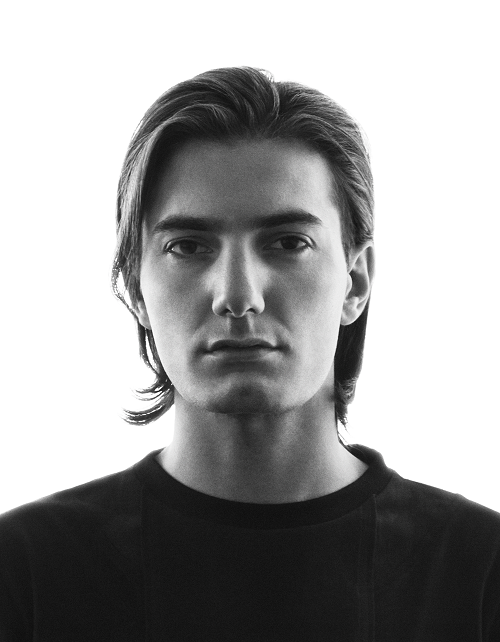
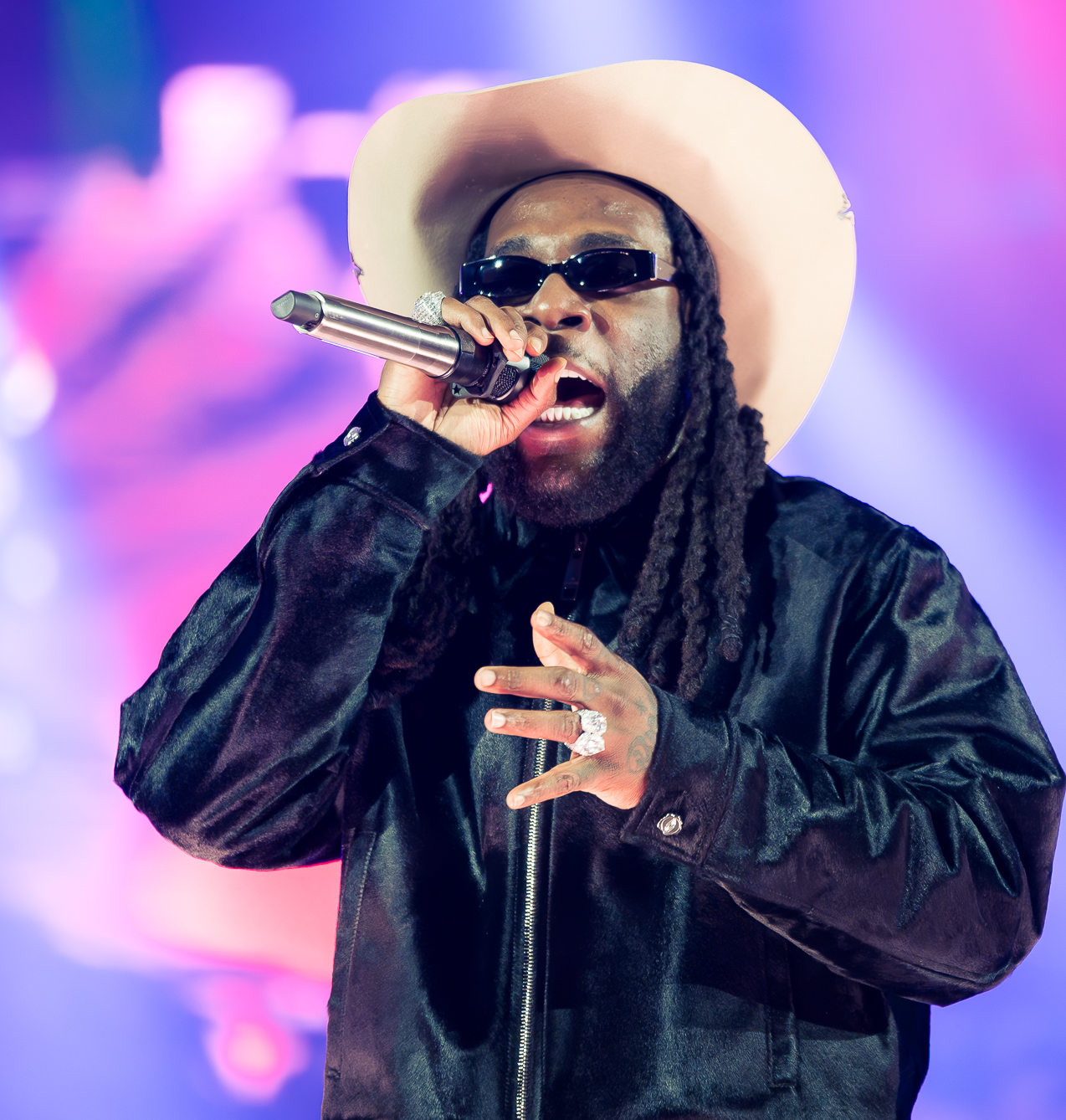
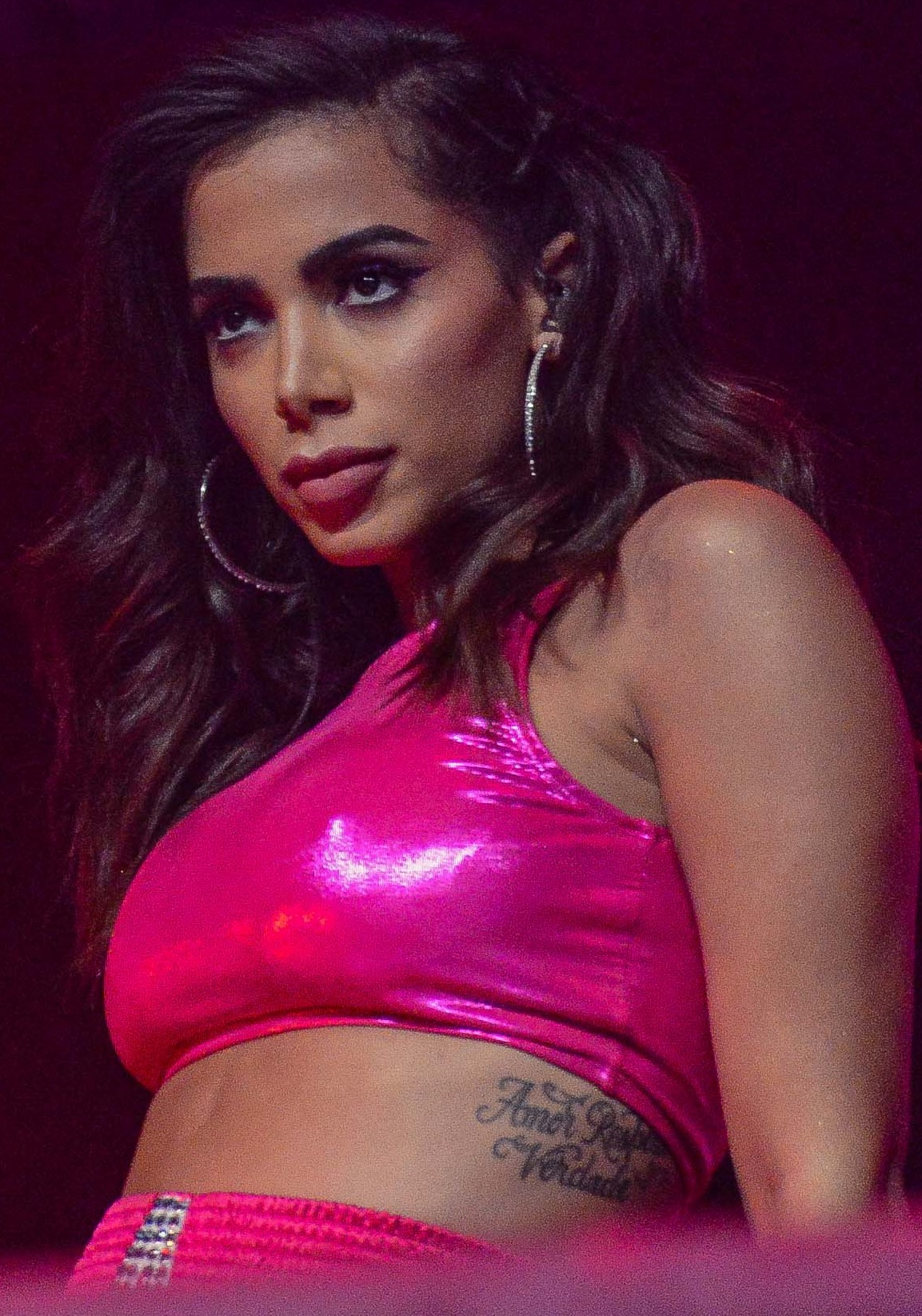
Alesso, Burna Boy and Anitta were the headline acts of the opening ceremony.

The opening ceremony before the match, officially known as the 2023 UEFA Champions League Final Kick Off Show by Pepsi for sponsorship reasons, featured Swedish DJ Alesso, Nigerian singer Burna Boy and Brazilian singer Anitta. Hungarian pianist Ádám György performed a special rendition of the UEFA Champions League Anthem as the teams walked out for the match.

=== Ticketing ===
With a stadium capacity of 72,000 for the final, a total amount of 47,200 tickets were available to fans and the general public, with the two finalist teams receiving 20,000 tickets each, and with the other tickets sold to fans worldwide via UEFA.com from 21 to 28 April 2023 in four price categories: €690, €490, €180 and €70. Accessibility tickets for disabled spectators cost €70. The remaining tickets were allocated to the local organising committee, national associations, commercial partners and broadcasters, and to serve the corporate hospitality programme.

== Match ==
=== Summary ===
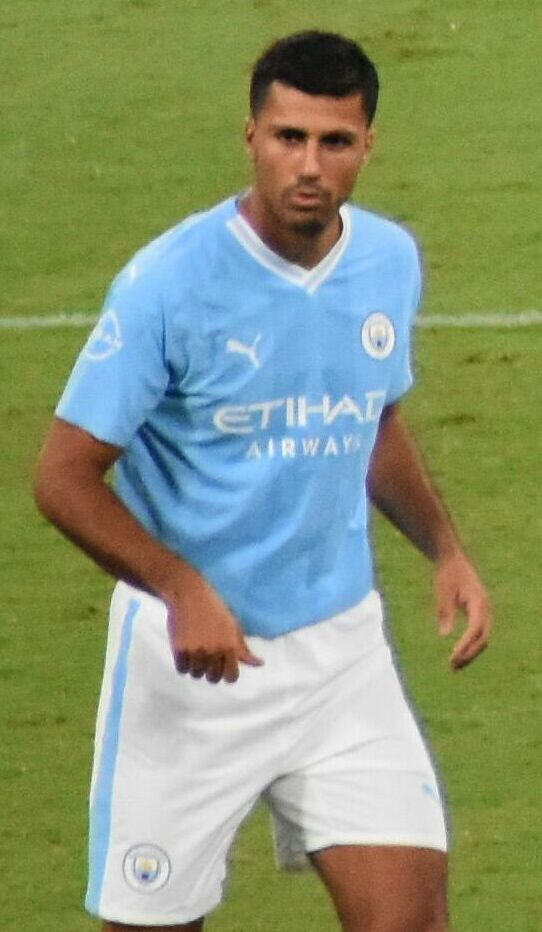
City midfielder Rodri was named man of the match after scoring its only goal.

Manchester City began the final with Kyle Walker on the bench and replaced by Nathan Aké in the starting line-up in an unexpected change; Inter Milan started Marcelo Brozović in place of Henrikh Mkhitaryan who was returning from an injury. The two sides had scoring chances early in the first half, but Inter's André Onana made two saves to prevent City from taking the lead. A misplayed pass from Ederson in the 26th minute was stolen by Nicolò Barella, but his shot over the goalkeeper missed. Kevin De Bruyne left the match in the 36th minute with a hamstring injury and was replaced by Phil Foden. The first half ended scoreless, with Inter playing defensively to prevent City from gaining momentum.

Romelu Lukaku was brought on to replace former City striker Edin Džeko early in the second half and immediately produced a chance from a header. In the 59th minute, Ederson failed to collect a backpass from Manuel Akanji which was found by Inter's Lautaro Martínez; his shot from near the touchline was saved by Ederson. Rodri scored the opening goal for City in the 68th minute with a side-footed finish to the right of the net after a pulled-back pass from Bernardo Silva on the right to the edge of the penalty area. Inter had a chance to equalise three minutes later through a header by defender Federico Dimarco that hit the crossbar. Dimarco tried to capitalise on the rebound as well, but his shot was accidentally blocked by his teammate Lukaku. The Belgian striker had his own chance to score from a close-range header in the 89th minute, which Ederson blocked with his legs. The Brazilian goalkeeper made an additional save in the sixth minute of stoppage time off Robin Gosens's header to preserve a 1–0 victory for City.

=== Details ===
The "home" team (for administrative purposes) was determined by an additional draw held after the quarter-final and semi-final draws.

10 June 2023
22:00 UTC+3

| Manchester City (The Football Association) | 1–0 | (Italian Football Federation) Inter Milan |
|---|---|---|
| Rodri 68' | Report |

Atatürk Olympic Stadium, Istanbul
Attendance: 71,412
Referee: Szymon Marciniak (Poland)

| Manchester City | Inter Milan |

| GK | 31 | (Brazil) Ederson | (yellow card) 90+4' |
| CB | 25 | (Switzerland) Manuel Akanji |
| CB | 3 | (Portugal) Rúben Dias |
| CB | 6 | (Netherlands) Nathan Aké |
| DM | 5 | (England) John Stones | | (substituted off) 82' |
| DM | 16 | (Spain) Rodri |
| RW | 20 | (Portugal) Bernardo Silva |
| AM | 17 | (Belgium) Kevin De Bruyne | | (substituted off) 36' |
| AM | 8 | (Germany) İlkay Gündoğan (c) |
| LW | 10 | (England) Jack Grealish |
| CF | 9 | (Norway) Erling Haaland | (yellow card) 90+2' |
Substitutes:
| GK | 18 | (Germany) Stefan Ortega |
| GK | 33 | (England) Scott Carson |
| DF | 2 | (England) Kyle Walker | | (substituted on) 82' |
| DF | 14 | (Spain) Aymeric Laporte |
| DF | 21 | (Spain) Sergio Gómez |
| DF | 82 | (England) Rico Lewis |
| MF | 4 | (England) Kalvin Phillips |
| MF | 32 | (Argentina) Máximo Perrone |
| MF | 47 | (England) Phil Foden | | (substituted on) 36' |
| MF | 80 | (England) Cole Palmer |
| FW | 19 | (Argentina) Julián Alvarez |
| FW | 26 | (Algeria) Riyad Mahrez |
Manager:
(Spain) Pep Guardiola

| GK | 24 | (Cameroon) André Onana | (yellow card) 90+2' |
| CB | 36 | (Italy) Matteo Darmian | | (substituted off) 84' |
| CB | 15 | (Italy) Francesco Acerbi |
| CB | 95 | (Italy) Alessandro Bastoni | | (substituted off) 76' |
| RM | 2 | (Netherlands) Denzel Dumfries | | (substituted off) 76' |
| CM | 23 | (Italy) Nicolò Barella | (yellow card) 59' |
| CM | 77 | (Croatia) Marcelo Brozović (c) |
| CM | 20 | (Turkey) Hakan Çalhanoğlu | | (substituted off) 84' |
| LM | 32 | (Italy) Federico Dimarco |
| CF | 10 | (Argentina) Lautaro Martínez |
| CF | 9 | (Bosnia and Herzegovina) Edin Džeko | | (substituted off) 57' |
Substitutes:
| GK | 1 | (Slovenia) Samir Handanović |
| GK | 21 | (Italy) Alex Cordaz |
| DF | 6 | (Netherlands) Stefan de Vrij |
| DF | 12 | (Italy) Raoul Bellanova | | (substituted on) 76' |
| DF | 33 | (Italy) Danilo D'Ambrosio | | (substituted on) 84' |
| DF | 37 | (Slovakia) Milan Škriniar |
| MF | 5 | (Italy) Roberto Gagliardini |
| MF | 8 | (Germany) Robin Gosens | | (substituted on) 76' |
| MF | 14 | (Albania) Kristjan Asllani |
| MF | 22 | (Armenia) Henrikh Mkhitaryan | | (substituted on) 84' |
| FW | 11 | (Argentina) Joaquín Correa |
| FW | 90 | (Belgium) Romelu Lukaku | (yellow card) 83' | (substituted on) 57' |
Manager:
| (Italy) Simone Inzaghi | | | (yellow card) 90+6' |

Man of the Match:
Rodri (Manchester City)

Assistant referees:
Paweł Sokolnicki (Poland)
Tomasz Listkiewicz (Poland)
Fourth official:
István Kovács (Romania)
Reserve assistant referee:
Vasile Marinescu (Romania)
Video assistant referee:
Tomasz Kwiatkowski (Poland)
Assistant video assistant referee:
Bartosz Frankowski (Poland)
Support video assistant referee:
Marco Fritz (Germany)

Match rules

- 90 minutes
- 30 minutes of extra time if necessary
- Penalty shoot-out if scores still level
- Twelve named substitutes
- Maximum of five substitutions, with a sixth allowed in extra time (Note: Each team was given only three opportunities to make substitutions, with a fourth opportunity in extra time, excluding substitutions made at half-time, before the start of extra time and at half-time in extra time.)

=== Statistics ===
First half
| Statistic | Manchester City | Inter Milan |
|---|---|---|
| Goals scored | 0 | 0 |
| Total shots | 4 | 4 |
| Shots on target | 2 | 1 |
| Saves | 1 | 2 |
| Ball possession | 61% | 39% |
| Corner kicks | 0 | 1 |
| Fouls committed | 4 | 8 |
| Offsides | 1 | 1 |
| Yellow cards | 0 | 0 |
| Red cards | 0 | 0 |

Second half
| Statistic | Manchester City | Inter Milan |
|---|---|---|
| Goals scored | 1 | 0 |
| Total shots | 3 | 10 |
| Shots on target | 2 | 4 |
| Saves | 4 | 1 |
| Ball possession | 54% | 46% |
| Corner kicks | 2 | 3 |
| Fouls committed | 7 | 9 |
| Offsides | 0 | 0 |
| Yellow cards | 2 | 4 |
| Red cards | 0 | 0 |

Overall
| Statistic | Manchester City | Inter Milan |
|---|---|---|
| Goals scored | 1 | 0 |
| Total shots | 7 | 14 |
| Shots on target | 4 | 5 |
| Saves | 5 | 3 |
| Ball possession | 57% | 43% |
| Corner kicks | 2 | 4 |
| Fouls committed | 11 | 17 |
| Offsides | 1 | 1 |
| Yellow cards | 2 | 4 |
| Red cards | 0 | 0 |

== Post-match ==
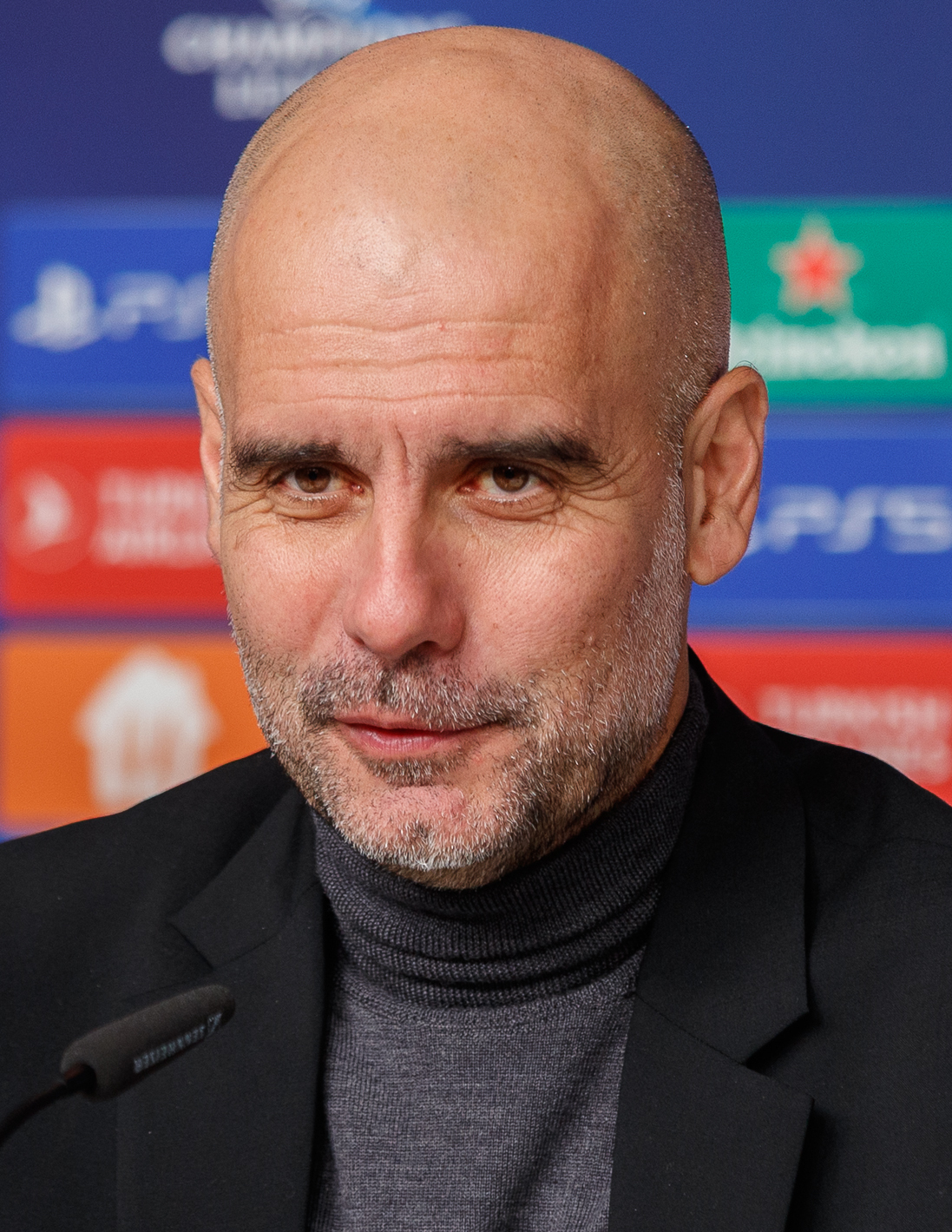
Manchester City's Pep Guardiola won his third Champions League title as a manager, and fourth overall.

With their victory, Manchester City secured their first UEFA Champions League title, the first new winners of the competition since fellow English club Chelsea in 2012. City became the sixth English club, and 23rd overall team, to win the European Cup, which marked the 15th time an English club were champions of the competition. Manchester City also completed the tenth continental treble in European football history, doing so as the eighth overall team and second English club after city rivals Manchester United in 1998–99. It was the 15th occasion a club won the European Cup unbeaten, with City the 11th club to accomplish the feat.

Pep Guardiola won his third Champions League final as a manager after his two titles with Barcelona in 2009 and 2011, becoming the second-most successful coach in the competition, behind Carlo Ancelotti's four victories. He also became the first manager to win two European trebles, having also done so with Barcelona in 2008–09. It was Guardiola's twelfth major trophy with Manchester City; after the match, he stated that "it was written in the stars that we'd win this season—and we did." City midfielder Rodri, who scored the lone goal of the game, was selected as the man of the match by UEFA's technical observers. Backup goalkeeper Scott Carson was the only City player to have previously won the competition, doing so as a reserve for Liverpool in 2005 at the same stadium. He thus equalled the record for the longest gap between a first and last European Cup title, shared with Milan's Paolo Maldini and Alessandro Costacurta. Forward Julián Alvarez, who won the 2022 FIFA World Cup with Argentina six months prior, became the first player to win the treble and World Cup in the same season. This also made him the tenth player to accomplish the European Cup and World Cup double.

As winners, Manchester City qualified for the 2023 UEFA Super Cup, where they defeated Spanish club Sevilla, winners of the 2022–23 UEFA Europa League, on penalties following a 1–1 draw after regulation time. City also qualified for two editions of the FIFA Club World Cup: the 2023 tournament held in December with seven teams, and the expanded 32-team tournament in 2025. Following the Nerazzurri defeat, Italian teams became the first in European football history to finish runners-up in each men's UEFA competition in a single season, including Roma and Fiorentina's losses in the Europa League final and in the Europa Conference League final, respectively.

== See also ==
- 2023 UEFA Europa League final
- 2023 UEFA Europa Conference League final
- 2023 UEFA Women's Champions League final
- 2022–23 Inter Milan season
- 2022–23 Manchester City F.C. season
- Inter Milan in international football
- Manchester City F.C. in international football
