= FIFA Club World Cup awards =

- David Luiz, Cássio and Paolo Guerrero (from left to right) accepting their individual awards after the 2012 FIFA Club World Cup final.
- Founded: 2000
- Region: International (FIFA)

The FIFA Club World Cup is an international association football competition organised by the Fédération Internationale de Football Association (FIFA), the sport's global governing body. The championship was first contested as the FIFA Club World Championship in 2000. It was not held between 2001 and 2004 due to a combination of factors, most importantly the collapse of FIFA's marketing partner International Sport and Leisure. Following a change in format which saw the FIFA Club World Championship absorb the Intercontinental Cup, it was relaunched in 2005 and took its current name the season afterwards.

The current format of the tournament, in use since the competition was revamped ahead of the 2025 edition, features 32 teams competing for the title at venues within the host nation; 12 teams from Europe, 6 from South America, 4 from Asia, 4 from Africa, 4 from North, Central America and Caribbean, 1 from Oceania, and 1 team from the host nation. The teams are drawn into eight groups of four, with each team playing three group stage matches in a round-robin format. The top two teams from each group advance to the knockout stage, starting with the round of 16 and culminating with the final.

At the end of each final tournament, several awards are attributed to the players and teams which have distinguished themselves from the rest in different aspects of the game. Spanish club Barcelona has been the only club to earn every award in one edition, a feat accomplished during the 2015 FIFA Club World Cup. Barcelona, along with Real Madrid, are also the only sides to have earned three FIFA Fair Play Trophies. Lionel Messi is also the only player to have won two Golden Ball awards. Uruguayan player Luis Suárez holds the record for the most goals scored in one edition (five in 2015).

== Awards ==
There are currently three awards:

- the Golden Ball for best player;
- the Man of the Match for the best player in each tournament match; first awarded in 2013;
- the FIFA Fair Play Trophy for the team with the best record of fair play.

The following two awards are no longer given:

- the Golden Shoe for best player; only awarded in 2000;
- the FIFA All-Star Team for the best squad of players of the tournament; only awarded in 2000.

The winners of the competition also receive the FIFA Club World Cup Champions Badge; it features an image of the trophy, which the reigning champion is entitled to display on its kit until the final of the next championship. The badge was first presented to Milan, the winners of the 2007 final. Initially, all four previous champions were allowed to wear the badge until the 2008 final, where Manchester United gained the sole right to wear the badge by winning the trophy.

Each player from the clubs finishing third, second and first also receive one bronze, silver and gold medal each, respectively.

== Golden Ball ==
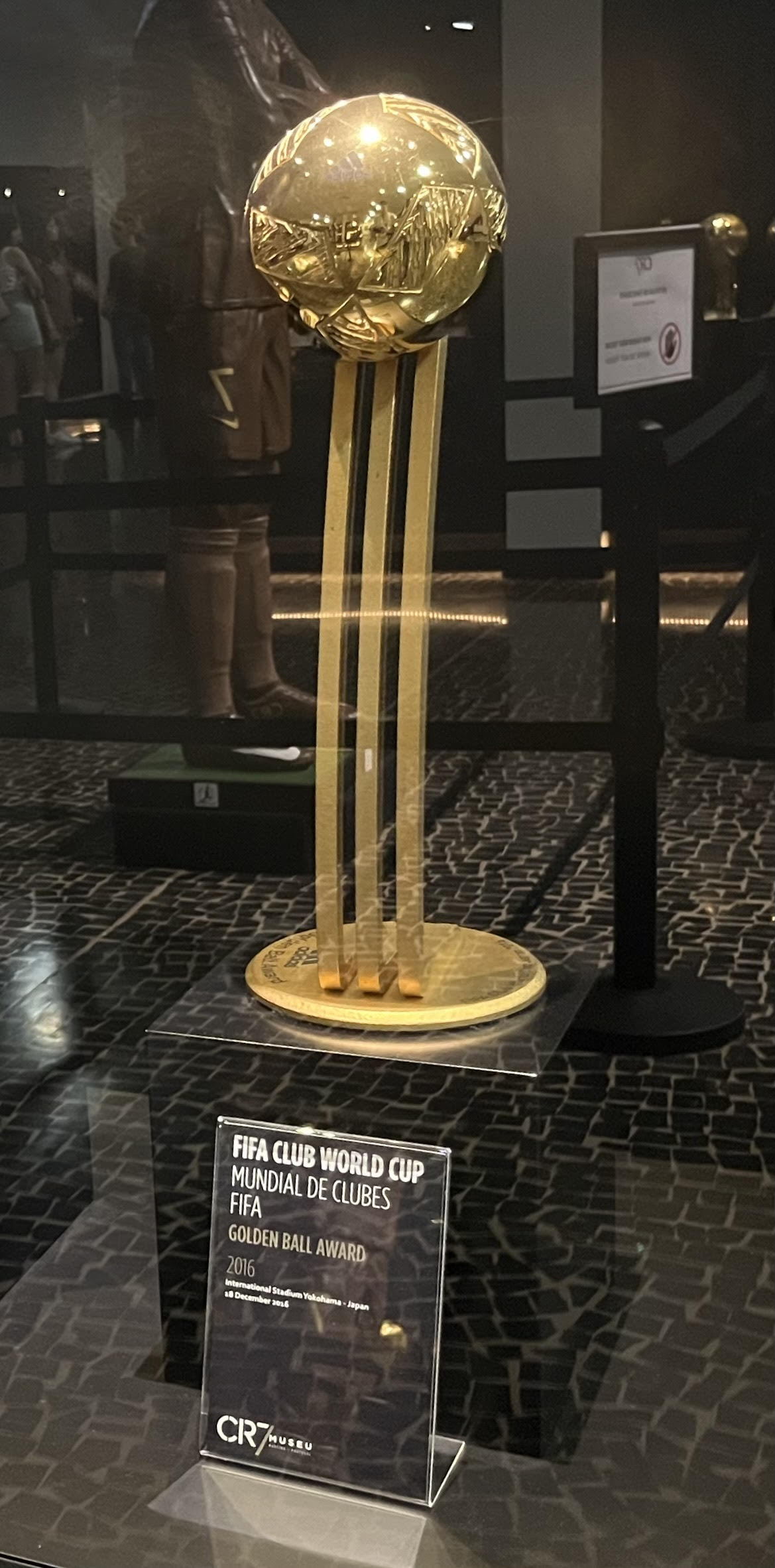
The Golden Ball Award on display in the Museu CR7.

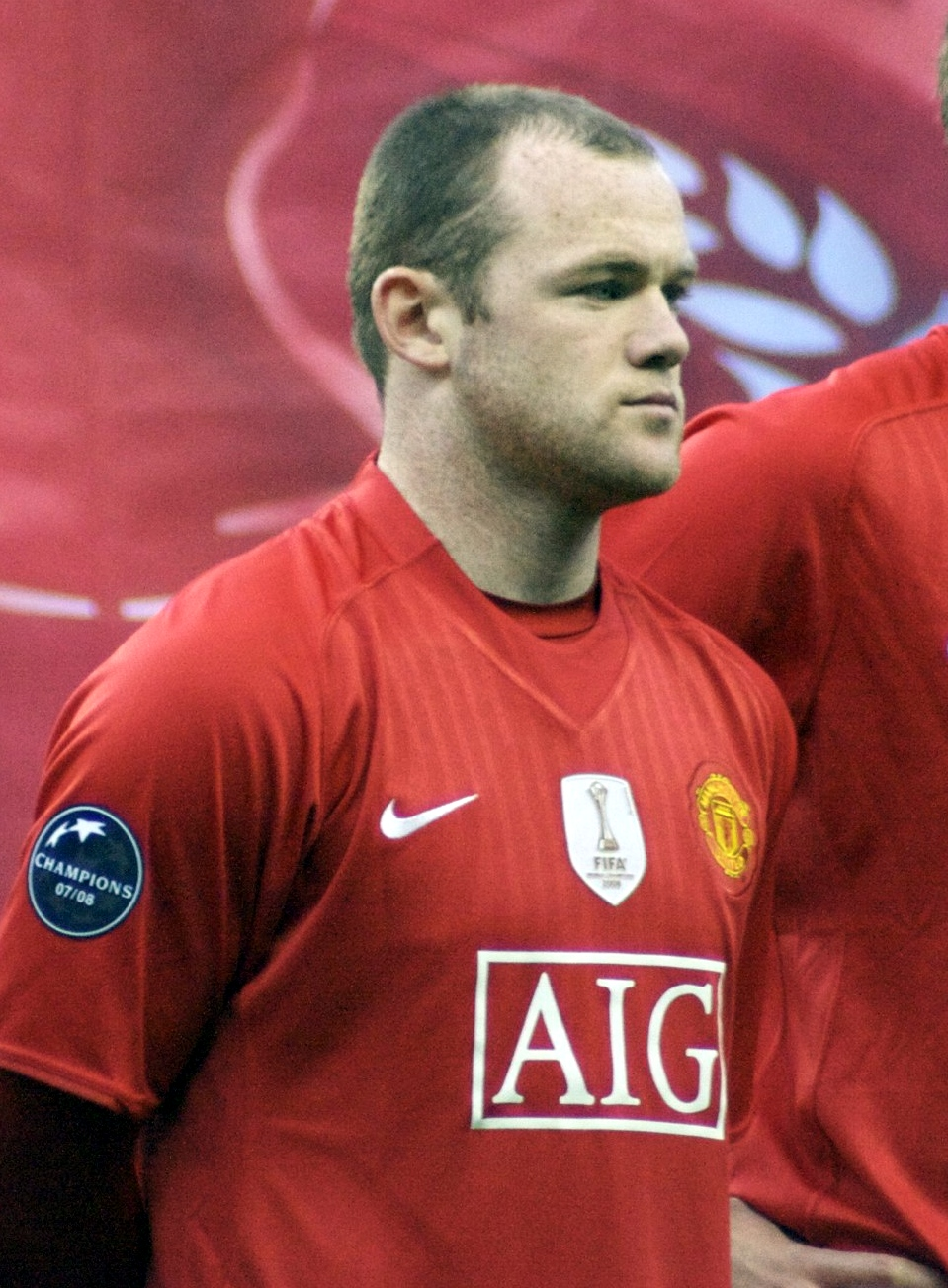
In 2008 Wayne Rooney became the first player to win the tournament, the Golden Ball, and the top goalscorer in a single edition, a feat that has since been equaled by Lionel Messi, Sergio Ramos, Luis Suárez, Cristiano Ronaldo and Gareth Bale.

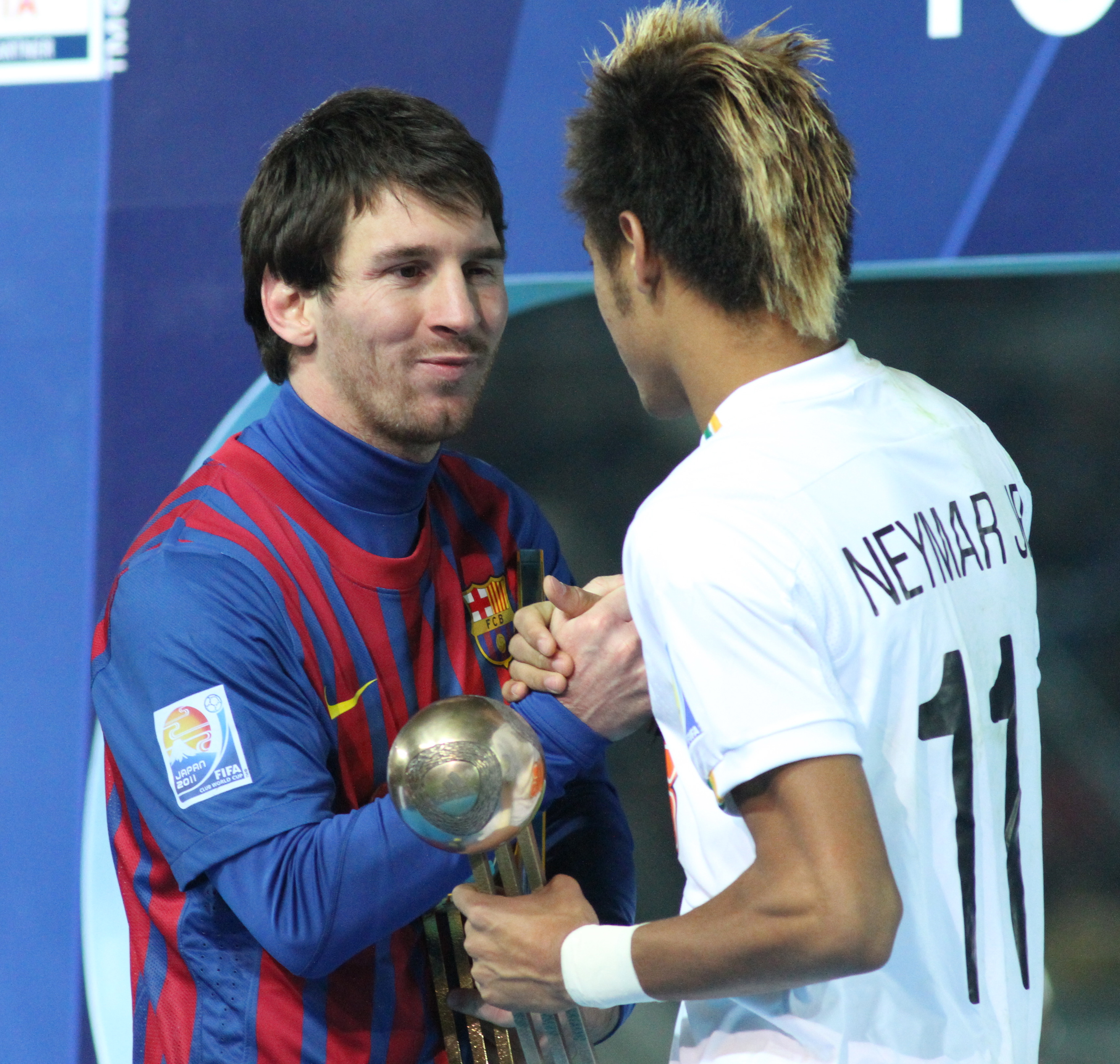
Lionel Messi (left) is the only player to have won two FIFA Club World Cup Golden Balls.

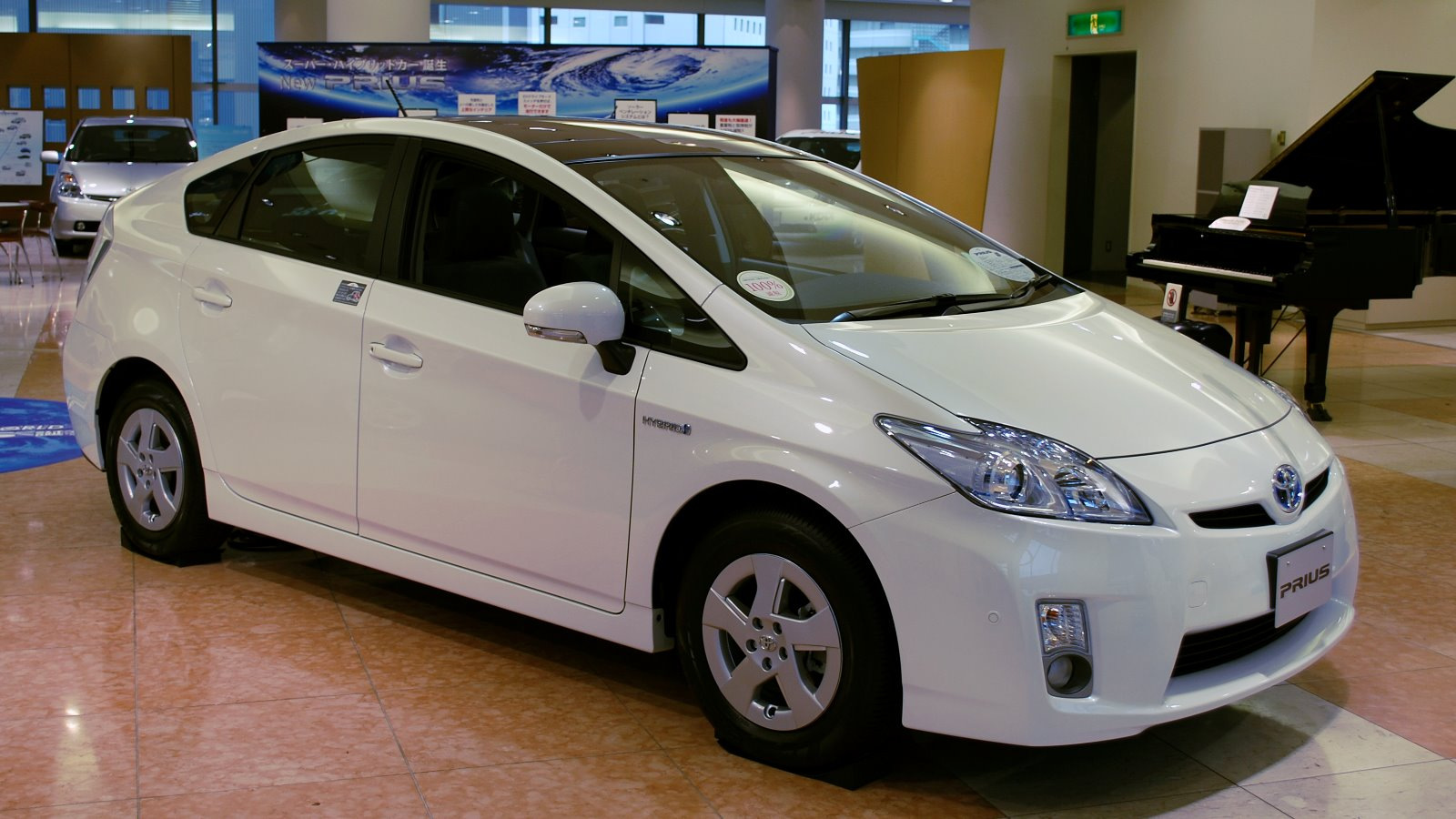
Toyota Motor Corporation, the presenting sponsor of the FIFA Club World Cup from 2005 to 2014, rewarded the Golden Ball winner with one of its vehicles.

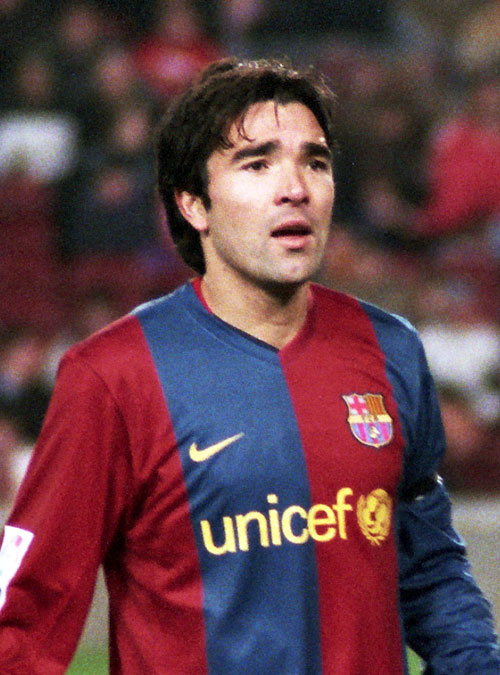
Deco is the only player to have won the Golden Ball but not the tournament.

The Golden Ball award is presented to the best player at each FIFA Club World Cup, with a shortlist drawn up by the FIFA technical committee and the winner voted for by representatives of the media. Those who finish as runners-up in the vote receive the Silver Ball and Bronze Ball awards as the second and third most outstanding players in the tournament respectively.

- Real Madrid (Sergio Ramos – 2014, Cristiano Ronaldo – 2016, Luka Modrić – 2017, Gareth Bale – 2018, Vinícius Júnior – 2022) is the only club to have earned the Golden Ball award five times.
- Barcelona is the only club to have earned every award in one edition (2015 Japan).
- Lionel Messi is the only player to have won two Golden Balls.
- Cristiano Ronaldo has won most awards (4), one Golden Ball and three Silver Balls.
- Brazilian players have won the most Golden Balls, amassing seven. They also hold the record for the most Silver and Bronze Balls with six and five, respectively.
- Cristian Bolaños, Dioko Kaluyituka, Mouhcine Iajour, Gaku Shibasaki and Ivan Vicelich are the only non-European and non-South American players who have earned the Silver Ball or the Bronze Ball while playing for a club that doesn't come from the aforementioned continents.

List of Golden Balls by edition
Edition	Golden Ball	Silver Ball	Bronze Ball	Ref(s)
2000 Brazil	(Brazil) Edílson	(Brazil) Edmundo	(Brazil) Romário	
2005 Japan	(Brazil) Rogério Ceni	(England) Steven Gerrard	(Costa Rica) Christian Bolaños	
2006 Japan	(Portugal) Deco	(Brazil) Iarley	(Brazil) Ronaldinho	
2007 Japan	(Brazil) Kaká	(Netherlands) Clarence Seedorf	(Argentina) Rodrigo Palacio	
2008 Japan	(England) Wayne Rooney	(Portugal) Cristiano Ronaldo	(Argentina) Damián Manso	
2009 United Arab Emirates	(Argentina) Lionel Messi	(Argentina) Juan Sebastián Verón	(Spain) Xavi	
2010 United Arab Emirates	(Cameroon) Samuel Eto'o	(Democratic Republic of the Congo) Dioko Kaluyituka	(Argentina) Andrés D'Alessandro	
2011 Japan	(Argentina) Lionel Messi	(Spain) Xavi	(Brazil) Neymar	
2012 Japan	(Brazil) Cássio	(Brazil) David Luiz	(Peru) Paolo Guerrero	
2013 Morocco	(France) Franck Ribéry	(Germany) Philipp Lahm	(Morocco) Mouhcine Iajour	
2014 Morocco	(Spain) Sergio Ramos	(Portugal) Cristiano Ronaldo	(New Zealand) Ivan Vicelich	
2015 Japan	(Uruguay) Luis Suárez	(Argentina) Lionel Messi	(Spain) Andrés Iniesta	
2016 Japan	(Portugal) Cristiano Ronaldo	(Croatia) Luka Modrić	(Japan) Gaku Shibasaki	
2017 United Arab Emirates	(Croatia) Luka Modrić	(Portugal) Cristiano Ronaldo	(Uruguay) Jonathan Urretaviscaya	
2018 United Arab Emirates	(Wales) Gareth Bale	(Brazil) Caio	(Colombia) Rafael Santos Borré	
2019 Qatar	(Egypt) Mohamed Salah	(Brazil) Bruno Henrique	(Brazil) Carlos Eduardo	
2020 Qatar	(Poland) Robert Lewandowski	(France) André-Pierre Gignac	(Germany) Joshua Kimmich	
2021 United Arab Emirates	(Brazil) Thiago Silva	(Brazil) Dudu	(Brazil) Danilo	
2022 Morocco	(Brazil) Vinícius Júnior	(Uruguay) Federico Valverde	(Argentina) Luciano Vietto	
2023 Saudi Arabia	(Spain) Rodri	(England) Kyle Walker	(Colombia) Jhon Arias	
2025 United States	(England) Cole Palmer	(Portugal) Vitinha	(Ecuador) Moisés Caicedo	

From 2005 to 2021, the winner of the Golden Ball was also presented with a separate trophy by the tournament sponsor. This was discontinued from the 2022 edition. The name of the award has varied:

- 2005–2014: Toyota Award (also known as the Toyota Golden Key)
  - During this period, the winner of the Toyota Award received a Toyota-made automobile as a prize or an equivalent amount in cash.
- 2015: Alibaba E-Auto Award
- 2016: Alibaba YunOS Auto Award
- 2017–2021: Alibaba Cloud Award (also known as the Alibaba Cloud Trophy or Alibaba Cloud Player of the Tournament)

== Man of the Match ==
The Man of the Match award was introduced in 2013 FIFA Club World Cup in Morocco. The award is given to the best player in each tournament match by the FIFA Technical Study Group.

Six players have won two man of the match awards:

- Four players won them in the same tournament: Luis Suárez (2015), Jonathan Urretaviscaya (2017), Khalid Eisa (2018) and Vinícius Júnior (2022).
- Two players won them in separate tournaments: Luka Modrić and Cristiano Ronaldo (both 2016 and 2017).
  - Cristiano Ronaldo is the only player to have won two final man of the match awards.

List of FIFA Club World Cup Man of the Match winners
Edition	Match	Player of the match	Club	Opponent
2013	1	(Morocco) Mouhcine Moutouali	(Morocco) Raja Casablanca	(New Zealand) Auckland City
2013	2	(Argentina) Darío Conca	(China) Guangzhou Evergrande	(Egypt) Al Ahly
2013	3	(Morocco) Khalid Askri	(Morocco) Raja Casablanca	(Mexico) Monterrey
2013	4	(Germany) Philipp Lahm	(Germany) Bayern Munich	(China) Guangzhou Evergrande
2013	5	(Argentina) César Delgado	(Mexico) Monterrey	(Egypt) Al Ahly
2013	6	(Morocco) Mouhcine Iajour	(Morocco) Raja Casablanca	(Brazil) Atlético Mineiro
2013	7	(Brazil) Diego Tardelli	(Brazil) Atlético Mineiro	(China) Guangzhou Evergrande
2013	8	(France) Franck Ribéry	(Germany) Bayern Munich	(Morocco) Raja Casablanca
2014	1	(New Zealand) Ivan Vicelich	(New Zealand) Auckland City	(Morocco) Moghreb Tétouan
2014	2	(England) John Irving	(New Zealand) Auckland City	(Algeria) ES Sétif
2014	3	(Mexico) Gerardo Torrado	(Mexico) Cruz Azul	(Australia) Western Sydney Wanderers
2014	4	(France) Karim Benzema	(Spain) Real Madrid	(Mexico) Cruz Azul
2014	5	(Algeria) Ahmed Gasmi	(Algeria) ES Sétif	(Australia) Western Sydney Wanderers
2014	6	(Argentina) Pablo Barrientos	(Argentina) San Lorenzo	(New Zealand) Auckland City
2014	7	(New Zealand) Tim Payne	(New Zealand) Auckland City	(Mexico) Cruz Azul
2014	8	(Spain) Sergio Ramos	(Spain) Real Madrid	(Argentina) San Lorenzo
2015	1	(Brazil) Douglas	(Japan) Sanfrecce Hiroshima	(New Zealand) Auckland City
2015	2	(Brazil) Paulinho	(China) Guangzhou Evergrande	(Mexico) América
2015	3	(Japan) Kazuyuki Morisaki	(Japan) Sanfrecce Hiroshima	(Democratic Republic of the Congo) TP Mazembe
2015	4	(Paraguay) Osvaldo Martínez	(Mexico) América	(Democratic Republic of the Congo) TP Mazembe
2015	5	(Argentina) Lucas Alario	(Argentina) River Plate	(Japan) Sanfrecce Hiroshima
2015	6	(Uruguay) Luis Suárez	(Spain) Barcelona	(China) Guangzhou Evergrande
2015	7	(Japan) Takuma Asano	(Japan) Sanfrecce Hiroshima	(China) Guangzhou Evergrande
2015	8	(Uruguay) Luis Suárez (2)	(Spain) Barcelona	(Argentina) River Plate
2016	1	(Japan) Ryota Nagaki	(Japan) Kashima Antlers	(New Zealand) Auckland City
2016	2	(Argentina) Silvio Romero	(Mexico) América	(South Korea) Jeonbuk Hyundai Motors
2016	3	(Japan) Mu Kanazaki	(Japan) Kashima Antlers	(South Africa) Mamelodi Sundowns
2016	4	(South Korea) Lee Jae-sung	(South Korea) Jeonbuk Hyundai Motors	(South Africa) Mamelodi Sundowns
2016	5	(Japan) Hitoshi Sogahata	(Japan) Kashima Antlers	(Colombia) Atlético Nacional
2016	6	(Croatia) Luka Modrić	(Spain) Real Madrid	(Mexico) América
2016	7	(Colombia) Orlando Berrío	(Colombia) Atlético Nacional	(Mexico) América
2016	8	(Portugal) Cristiano Ronaldo	(Spain) Real Madrid	(Japan) Kashima Antlers
2017	1	(United Arab Emirates) Ali Khasif	(United Arab Emirates) Al-Jazira	(New Zealand) Auckland City
2017	2	(Uruguay) Jonathan Urretaviscaya	(Mexico) Pachuca	(Morocco) Wydad Casablanca
2017	3	(United Arab Emirates) Ali Mabkhout	(United Arab Emirates) Al-Jazira	(Japan) Urawa Red Diamonds
2017	4	(Japan) Yōsuke Kashiwagi	(Japan) Urawa Red Diamonds	(Morocco) Wydad Casablanca
2017	5	(Brazil) Everton	(Brazil) Grêmio	(Mexico) Pachuca
2017	6	(Croatia) Luka Modrić (2)	(Spain) Real Madrid	(United Arab Emirates) Al-Jazira
2017	7	(Uruguay) Jonathan Urretaviscaya (2)	(Mexico) Pachuca	(United Arab Emirates) Al-Jazira
2017	8	(Portugal) Cristiano Ronaldo (2)	(Spain) Real Madrid	(Brazil) Grêmio
2018	1	(United Arab Emirates) Khalid Eisa	(United Arab Emirates) Al-Ain	(New Zealand) Team Wellington
2018	2	(Egypt) Hussein El Shahat	(United Arab Emirates) Al-Ain	(Tunisia) Espérance de Tunis
2018	3	(Japan) Shoma Doi	(Japan) Kashima Antlers	(Mexico) Guadalajara
2018	4	(Tunisia) Rami Jridi	(Tunisia) Espérance de Tunis	(Mexico) Guadalajara
2018	5	(United Arab Emirates) Khalid Eisa (2)	(United Arab Emirates) Al-Ain	(Argentina) River Plate
2018	6	(Wales) Gareth Bale	(Spain) Real Madrid	(Japan) Kashima Antlers
2018	7	(Colombia) Rafael Santos Borré	(Argentina) River Plate	(Japan) Kashima Antlers
2018	8	(Spain) Marcos Llorente	(Spain) Real Madrid	(United Arab Emirates) Al-Ain
2019	1	(Algeria) Baghdad Bounedjah	(Qatar) Al-Sadd	(New Caledonia) Hienghène Sport
2019	2	(Mexico) Rodolfo Pizarro	(Mexico) Monterrey	(Qatar) Al-Sadd
2019	3	(Peru) André Carrillo	(Saudi Arabia) Al-Hilal	(Tunisia) Espérance de Tunis
2019	4	(Libya) Hamdou Elhouni	(Tunisia) Espérance de Tunis	(Qatar) Al-Sadd
2019	5	(Brazil) Bruno Henrique	(Brazil) Flamengo	(Saudi Arabia) Al-Hilal
2019	6	(Egypt) Mohamed Salah	(England) Liverpool	(Mexico) Monterrey
2019	7	(Mexico) Luis Cárdenas	(Mexico) Monterrey	(Saudi Arabia) Al-Hilal
2019	8	(Brazil) Roberto Firmino	(England) Liverpool	(Brazil) Flamengo
2020	2	(France) André-Pierre Gignac	(Mexico) UANL	(South Korea) Ulsan Hyundai
2020	3	(Egypt) Ayman Ashraf	(Egypt) Al Ahly	(Qatar) Al-Duhail
2020	4	(Belgium) Edmilson	(Qatar) Al-Duhail	(South Korea) Ulsan Hyundai
2020	5	(Colombia) Luis Quiñones	(Mexico) UANL	(Brazil) Palmeiras
2020	6	(Poland) Robert Lewandowski	(Germany) Bayern Munich	(Egypt) Al Ahly
2020	7	(Egypt) Mohamed El Shenawy	(Egypt) Al Ahly	(Brazil) Palmeiras
2020	8	(Germany) Joshua Kimmich	(Germany) Bayern Munich	(Mexico) UANL
2021	1	(United Arab Emirates) Mohammed Jamal	(United Arab Emirates) Al-Jazira	(French Polynesia) AS Pirae
2021	2	(Egypt) Ramy Rabia	(Egypt) Al Ahly	(Mexico) Monterrey
2021	3	(Brazil) Matheus Pereira	(Saudi Arabia) Al-Hilal	(United Arab Emirates) Al-Jazira
2021	4	(Brazil) Raphael Veiga	(Brazil) Palmeiras	(Egypt) Al Ahly
2021	5	(Argentina) Maximiliano Meza	(Mexico) Monterrey	(United Arab Emirates) Al-Jazira
2021	6	(Croatia) Mateo Kovačić	(England) Chelsea	(Saudi Arabia) Al-Hilal
2021	7	(Egypt) Yasser Ibrahim	(Egypt) Al Ahly	(Saudi Arabia) Al-Hilal
2021	8	(Germany) Antonio Rüdiger	(England) Chelsea	(Brazil) Palmeiras
2022	1	(Egypt) Mohamed Sherif	(Egypt) Al Ahly	(New Zealand) Auckland City
2022	2	(Egypt) Mohamed Magdy	(Egypt) Al Ahly	(United States) Seattle Sounders FC
2022	3	(Colombia) Gustavo Cuéllar	(Saudi Arabia) Al-Hilal	(Morocco) Wydad Casablanca
2022	4	(Saudi Arabia) Salem Al-Dawsari	(Saudi Arabia) Al-Hilal	(Brazil) Flamengo
2022	5	(Brazil) Vinícius Júnior	(Spain) Real Madrid	(Egypt) Al Ahly
2022	6	(Brazil) Pedro	(Brazil) Flamengo	(Egypt) Al Ahly
2022	7	(Brazil) Vinícius Júnior (2)	(Spain) Real Madrid	(Saudi Arabia) Al-Hilal
2023	1	(France) N'Golo Kanté	(Saudi Arabia) Al-Ittihad	(New Zealand) Auckland City
2023	2	(Egypt) Marwan Attia	(Egypt) Al Ahly	(Saudi Arabia) Al-Ittihad
2023	3	(Japan) Yoshio Koizumi	(Japan) Urawa Red Diamonds	(Mexico) León
2023	4	(Brazil) André	(Brazil) Fluminense	(Egypt) Al Ahly
2023	5	(Spain) Rodri	(England) Manchester City	(Japan) Urawa Red Diamonds
2023	6	(Egypt) Emam Ashour	(Egypt) Al Ahly	(Japan) Urawa Red Diamonds
2023	7	(Argentina) Julián Álvarez	(England) Manchester City	(Brazil) Fluminense

Man of the Match winners in the final
Final	Player of the Match	Ref(s)
2013 Morocco	(France) Franck Ribéry	
2014 Morocco	(Spain) Sergio Ramos	
2015 Japan	(Uruguay) Luis Suárez	
2016 Japan	(Portugal) Cristiano Ronaldo	
2017 United Arab Emirates	(Portugal) Cristiano Ronaldo	
2018 United Arab Emirates	(Spain) Marcos Llorente	
2019 Qatar	(Brazil) Roberto Firmino	
2020 Qatar	(Germany) Joshua Kimmich	
2021 United Arab Emirates	(Germany) Antonio Rüdiger	
2022 Morocco	(Brazil) Vinícius Júnior	
2023 Saudi Arabia	(Argentina) Julián Álvarez	
2025 United States	(England) Cole Palmer	

The name of the award has varied based on the tournament sponsor:

- 2013–2014: Toyota Match Award
- 2015: Alibaba E-Auto Match Award
- 2016: Alibaba YunOS Auto Match Award
- 2017–2021: Alibaba Cloud Match Award
- 2022–present: Man of the Match presented by Visit Saudi

== FIFA Fair Play Trophy ==
The FIFA Fair Play Trophy is given to the team with the best record of fair play during the Club World Cup tournament. The winners of this award earn the FIFA Fair Play Award, a diploma, a fair play medal for each player and official, and $50,000 worth of football equipment to be used for youth development.

Real Madrid is the only club to have won four FIFA Fair Play Trophies.

List of FIFA Fair Play Trophies by edition
Edition	FIFA Fair Play Trophy Winners	Ref(s)
2000 Brazil	(Saudi Arabia) Al-Nassr	
2005 Japan	(England) Liverpool	
2006 Japan	(Spain) Barcelona	
2007 Japan	(Japan) Urawa Red Diamonds	
2008 Japan	(Australia) Adelaide United	
2009 United Arab Emirates	(Mexico) Atlante	
2010 United Arab Emirates	(Italy) Internazionale	
2011 Japan	(Spain) Barcelona	
2012 Japan	(Mexico) Monterrey	
2013 Morocco	(Germany) Bayern Munich	
2014 Morocco	(Spain) Real Madrid	
2015 Japan	(Spain) Barcelona	
2016 Japan	(Japan) Kashima Antlers	
2017 United Arab Emirates	(Spain) Real Madrid	
2018 United Arab Emirates	(Spain) Real Madrid	
2019 Qatar	(Tunisia) Espérance de Tunis	
2020 Qatar	(Qatar) Al-Duhail	
2021 United Arab Emirates	(England) Chelsea	
2022 Morocco	(Spain) Real Madrid	
2023 Saudi Arabia	(Saudi Arabia) Al-Ittihad	
2025 United States	(Germany) Bayern Munich	

== Golden Shoe ==
The Golden Shoe award went to the top goalscorer of the FIFA Club World Cup. It was only awarded at the inaugural tournament in 2000. If more than one player finishes the tournament with the same number of goals, the tie goes to the player who has contributed the most assists (with the FIFA Technical Study Group deciding whether an assist is to be counted as such). Silver and Bronze Boots are awarded to the second- and third-placed players.

Edition	Golden Shoe	Silver Shoe	Bronze Shoe
2000	(France) Nicolas Anelka (Real Madrid) (Brazil) Romário (Vasco da Gama); 3 goals, 0 assists	N/A	(Ecuador) Agustín Delgado (Necaxa) (Brazil) Edílson (Corinthians) (Brazil) Edmundo (Vasco da Gama); 2 goals, 1 assist

== FIFA All-Star Team ==
The FIFA All-Star Team is a squad of the best players of the tournament. It was only awarded at the inaugural tournament in 2000. The squad includes eleven starters and seven substitutes.

Edition	Goalkeepers	Defenders	Midfielders	Forwards
2000	(Brazil) Dida (Corinthians)	(Mexico) Sergio Almaguer (Necaxa); (Spain) Fernando Hierro (Real Madrid); (Spain) Míchel Salgado (Real Madrid); (Netherlands) Jaap Stam (Manchester United)	(Brazil) Felipe (Vasco da Gama); (Republic of Ireland) Roy Keane (Manchester United); (Colombia) Freddy Rincón (Corinthians); (Brazil) Sávio (Real Madrid)	(Ecuador) Agustín Delgado (Necaxa); (Brazil) Romário (Vasco da Gama)
2000	Substitutes			
2000	(Brazil) Helton (Vasco da Gama)	(Mexico) José Milián (Necaxa)	(Brazil) Amaral (Vasco da Gama); (Brazil) Juninho (Vasco da Gama); (Chile) Cristián Montecinos (Necaxa)	(Morocco) Ahmed Bahja (Al-Nasr); (Brazil) Edílson (Corinthians)

== Hat-tricks ==
- Luis Suárez, Cristiano Ronaldo, Gareth Bale, Hamdou Elhouni, Jamal Musiala and Wessam Abou Ali are the only players who have scored a hat-trick in the competition. Suárez did so in the 2015 semi-final against Guangzhou Evergrande, scoring all three goals of the match. Cristiano Ronaldo scored a hat-trick in the 2016 final against Kashima Antlers, an equalizing penalty kick followed by two extra time goals. Gareth Bale scored a hat-trick in the 2018 semi-final, also against Kashima Antlers, where he scored all three of his team's goals before being substituted in less than an hour. Hamdou Elhouni scored a hat-trick in 2019 edition, when Espérance de Tunis won 6–2 against Al-Sadd in the match for fifth place. Musiala and Abou Ali scored the most recent hat-tricks in 2025. The former scored a hat-trick in FC Bayern Munich's historic 10-0 win against Auckland City FC and the latter scored a hat-trick in Al Ahly SC's 4-4 draw against FC Porto, both in the group stages.
