= Rico Lewis =

English footballer (born 2004)

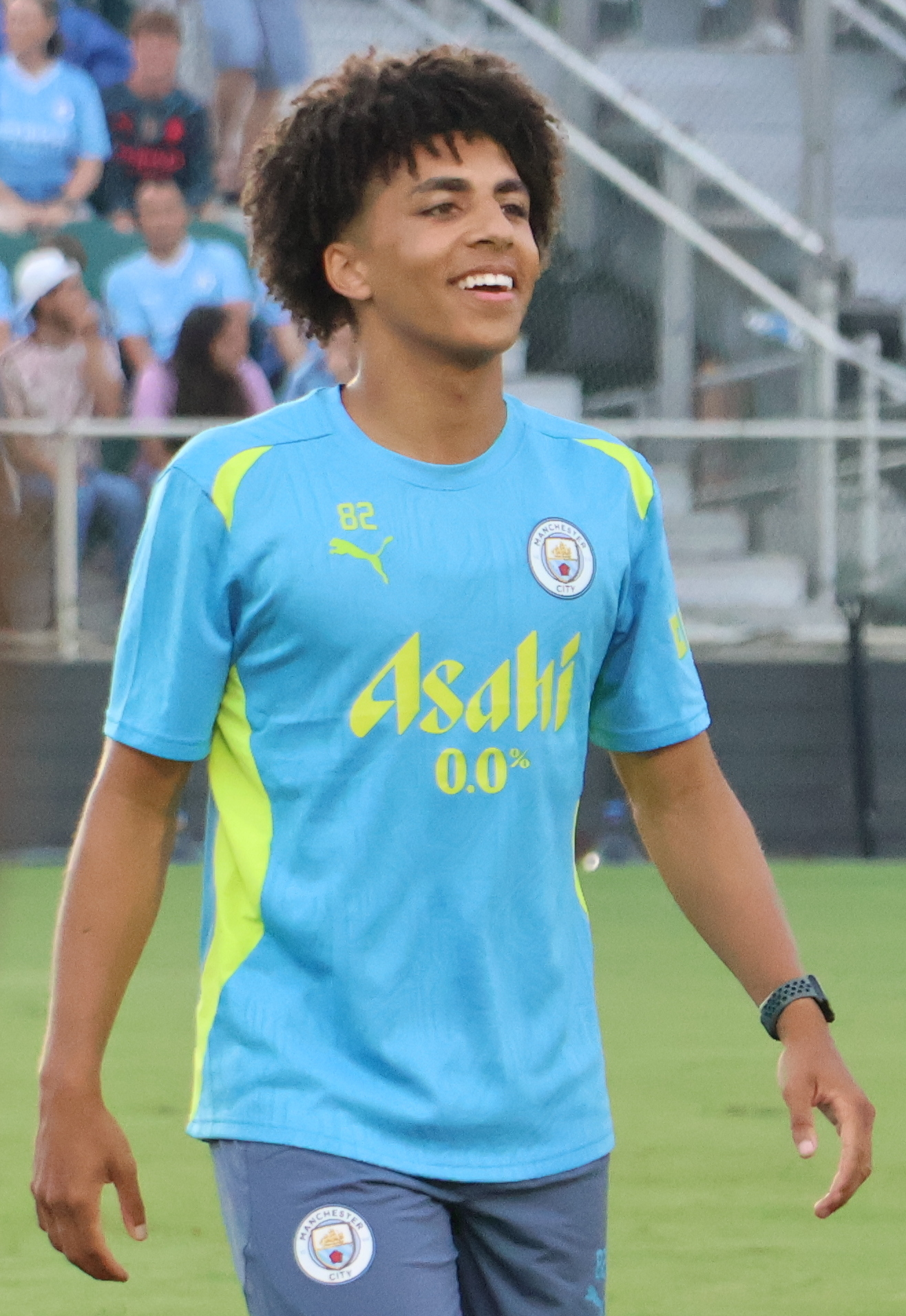
- Lewis with Manchester City in 2024

Personal information
- Full name: Rico Mark Lewis
- Date of birth: 21 November 2004 (age 21)
- Place of birth: Bury, England
- Height: 5 ft 7 in (1.69 m)
- Positions: Full-back; defensive midfielder

Team information
- Current team: Manchester City
- Number: 82

Youth career
- 2013–2022: Manchester City

Senior career*
Years	Team	Apps	(Gls)
2022–	Manchester City	70	(3)

International career^{‡}
2019–2020	England U16	3	(0)
2021–2022	England U18	7	(1)
2022	England U19	3	(0)
2023–	England U21	12	(2)
2023–	England	5	(0)
- * Club domestic league appearances and goals as of 23:09, 23 August 2026 (UTC) ‡ National team caps and goals as of 13:17, 19 November 2025 (UTC)

Rico Mark Lewis (born 21 November 2004) is an English professional footballer who plays as a full-back or defensive midfielder for Premier League club Manchester City and the England national team.

== Early and personal life ==
Rico Mark Lewis was born on 21 November 2004 in Bury, Greater Manchester. When he was young, Lewis was inspired by the boxer Muhammad Ali. He is of Jamaican descent. He married his girlfriend Amelia on 7 July 2026. Lewis is a Christian.

His younger sister Sacha is also a footballer for Manchester City.

== Club career ==
=== Early career ===
Lewis joined Manchester City's academy at the age of eight and joined the club's under-18 team at the age of 15. He captained the team for the 2021–22 season, with the team winning the title.

=== 2022–23 season ===
Lewis was named on City's bench for the first time for Manchester City's first match of the 2022–23 season and made his Premier League debut a week later, on 13 August 2022, against AFC Bournemouth, coming on as an 82nd-minute substitute for Kyle Walker. On 5 October, Lewis made his UEFA Champions League debut for Manchester City in a 5–0 win against Copenhagen, entering as a substitute for João Cancelo.

After a string of substitute appearances, Lewis was given his first start in the Champions League on 2 November 2022, scoring the equaliser in a 3–1 comeback win against Sevilla. In doing so, he became the youngest scorer on a first start in a Champions League match, and City's youngest ever Champions League scorer, aged 17 years and 346 days. Lewis received racist abuse during the match from Sevilla fans. On 28 December, he was given his first start in the Premier League, in a 3–1 win over Leeds United, playing until the 68th minute, coming off for João Cancelo.

On 20 May 2023, Manchester City won the 2022–23 Premier League title, with Lewis playing 14 matches, starting 10. His team also won the FA Cup, with him playing all games but the final, completing a domestic double. On 10 June, his team won the Champions League for the first time, with Lewis being an unused substitute in the final, completing a continental treble.

=== 2023–present ===
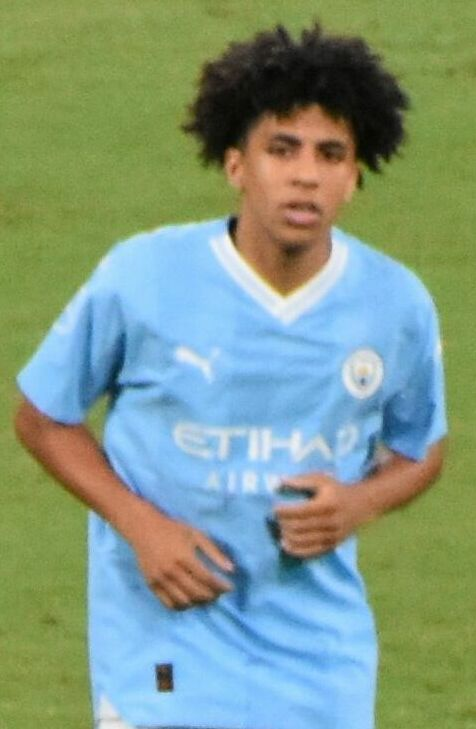
Lewis playing for Manchester City in 2023

On 15 August 2023, Lewis signed a new five-year contract with City. He scored his first league goal for the club on 16 December in a 2–2 draw at home to Crystal Palace. On 22 December, Lewis started in central midfield in the 2023 FIFA Club World Cup final, playing 60 minutes as City beat Fluminense 4–0 in Jeddah to become world champions for the first time.

On 27 April 2025, Lewis scored his first FA Cup goal in the 2nd minute of City's 2–0 semi-final victory against Nottingham Forest, helping his team reach their third successive final in the competition. On 18 June, during the opening match of the 2025 FIFA Club World Cup, he was shown a straight red card in a 2–0 victory over Wydad AC. The dismissal led to an extended suspension, ruling him out for the remainder of the tournament. On 12 September, he extended his contract with the club until 2030. Later that month, on 27 September, Lewis made his 100th appearance for Manchester City, coming on as an 83rd-minute substitute in a 5–1 home victory against Burnley in the Premier League.

== International career ==
In September 2021, Lewis scored for the England national under-18 team in a draw against Wales.

On 21 September 2022, Lewis made his under-19 debut in a 2–0 2023 UEFA European Under-19 Championship qualification win over Montenegro in Denmark.

Lewis made his debut for the under-21s on 28 March 2023 in a 2–1 defeat to Croatia at Craven Cottage.

On 13 November 2023, Lewis received his first call-up to the senior England national team ahead of their UEFA Euro 2024 qualifying matches against Malta and North Macedonia. He made his debut on 20 November, playing the entirety of a 1–1 draw away to North Macedonia, a result that ensured England top seeding at Euro 2024.

On 4 October 2026, Thomas Tuchel called Lewis into the England camp to replace the injured Nico O'Reilly ahead of England's Nations League match against Czech Republic. It was the first time in two years Lewis had any involvement in a senior England camp.

== Career statistics ==
=== Club ===
As of match played 17 September 2026

Appearances and goals by club, season and competition
Club	Season	League			FA Cup		EFL Cup		Europe		Other		Total	
Club	Season	Division	Apps	Goals	Apps	Goals	Apps	Goals	Apps	Goals	Apps	Goals	Apps	Goals
Manchester City U21	2021–22	—			—		—		—		1 (Note: Appearance in EFL Trophy)	0	1	0
Manchester City U21	2022–23	—			—		—		—		1	0	1	0
Manchester City U21	Total		—		—		—		—		2	0	2	0
Manchester City	2022–23	Premier League	14	0	5	0	2	0	2 (Note: Appearances in UEFA Champions League)	1	0	0	23	1
Manchester City	2023–24	Premier League	16	2	2	0	1	0	7	0	1 (Note: Appearance in FIFA Club World Cup)	0	27	2
Manchester City	2024–25	Premier League	28	1	3	1	2	0	9	0	2 (Note: One appearance in FA Community Shield, one appearance in FIFA Club World Cup)	0	44	2
Manchester City	2025–26	Premier League	11	0	2	2	5	0	4	0	—		22	2
Manchester City	2026–27	Premier League	1	0	0	0	1	0	0	0	1 (Note: Appearance in FA Community Shield)	0	3	0
Manchester City	Total		70	3	12	3	11	0	22	1	4	0	119	7
Career total			70	3	12	3	11	0	22	1	6	0	121	7

=== International ===
As of match played 14 November 2024

Appearances and goals by national team and year
National team	Year	Apps	Goals
England	2023	1	0
England	2024	4	0
Total		5	0

== Honours ==
Manchester City

- Premier League: 2022–23, 2023–24
- FA Cup: 2022–23
- FA Community Shield: 2024
- UEFA Champions League: 2022–23
- UEFA Super Cup: 2023
- FIFA Club World Cup: 2023

=== Individual ===
- * Manchester City Under-18s Player of the Year: 2021–22
- IFFHS Men's Youth (U20) World Team: 2024
