= Tomasz Listkiewicz =

Polish assistant football referee

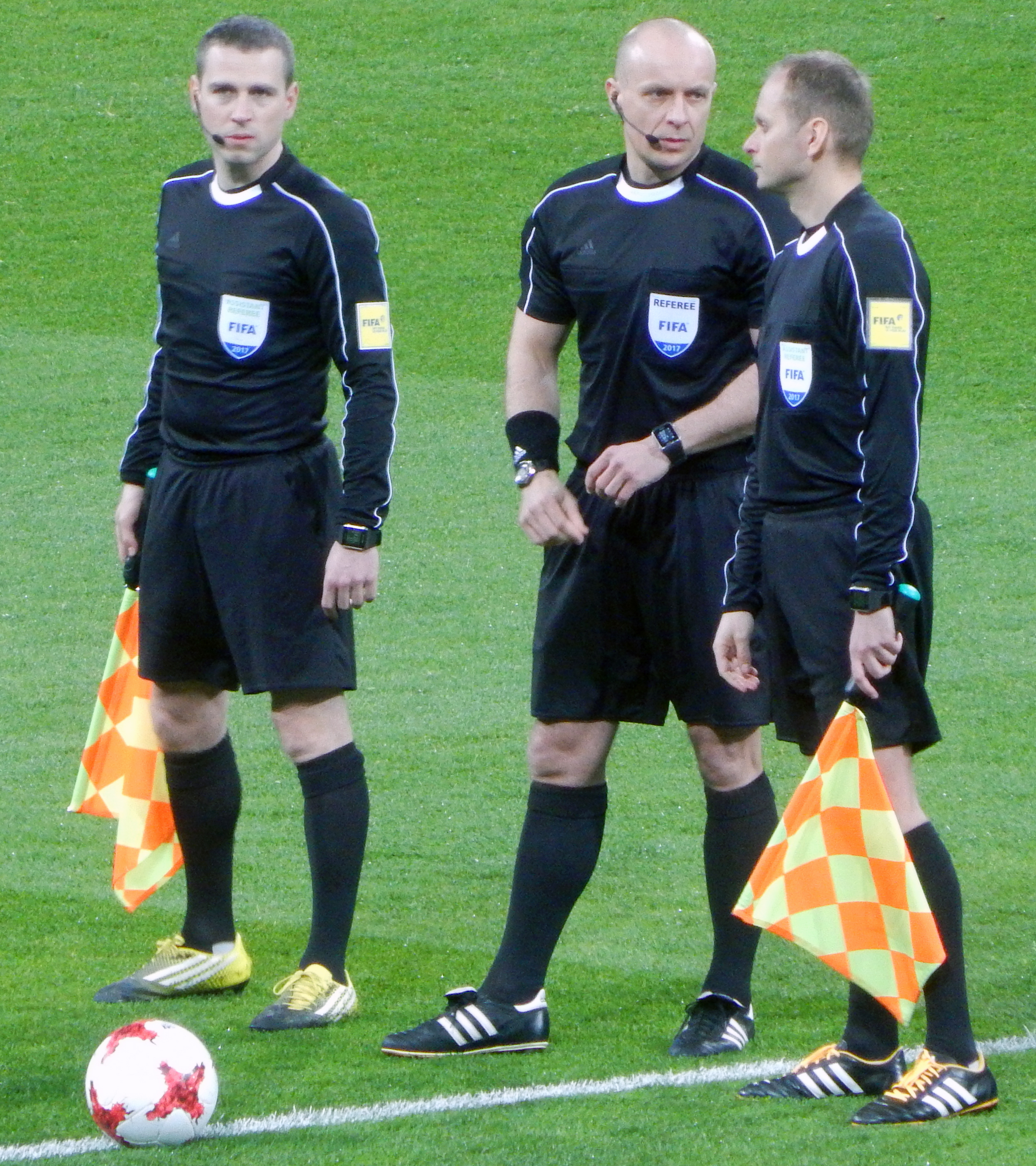
- Listkiewicz (left) in 2017
- Born: 1977 or 1978 (age 47–48); Warsaw, Poland

Domestic
Years	League	Role

International
Years	League	Role
2011–present	FIFA listed	Referee; VAR

Tomasz Listkiewicz (born 1977 or 1978) is a Polish football assistant referee who has been listed on the FIFA International Referees List since 2011.

== Career ==
Listkiewicz was born in Warsaw, Poland, the son of former FIFA referee Michał Listkiewicz. His father was an assistant referee at the 1990 FIFA World Cup final between West Germany and Argentina.

Following his father's footsteps, Likstkiewicz took up refereeing, reaching the Ekstraklasa, the top-tier Polish league. After earning his FIFA badge in 2011, Likstkiewicz took part in several international tournaments, including the 2016 and the 2024 UEFA Euro, as well as two finals in 2023: the UEFA Champions League final and the FIFA Club World Cup final.

Listkiewicz's first FIFA World Cup was the 2018 edition in Russia. He was again appointed to another cup at the 2022 FIFA World Cup in Qatar, where he was part of the refereeing team led by fellow Pole Szymon Marciniak at the final match between Argentina and France.

In April 2026, Listkiewicz was selected for a third participation in the tournament, joining Marciniak and Adam Kupsik, also from Poland, at the 2026 FIFA World Cup in North America.
