= Szymon Marciniak =

Polish football referee (born 1981)

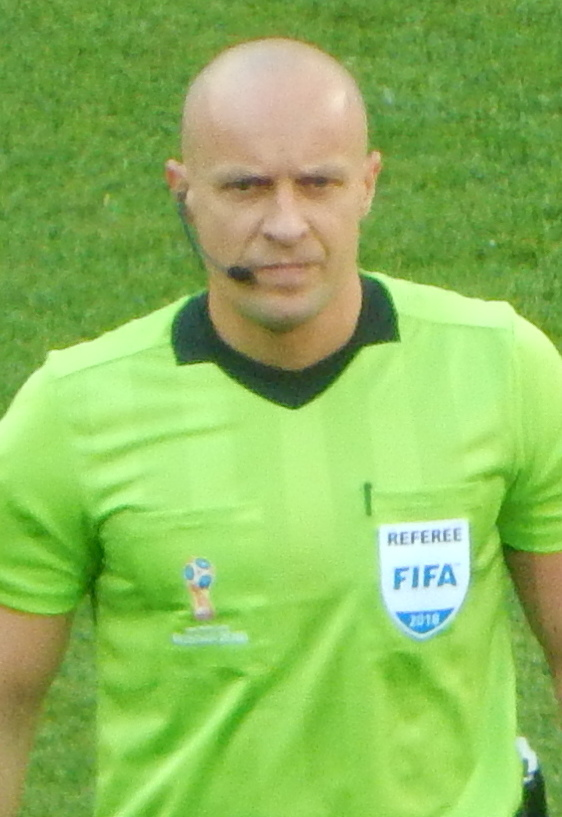
- Marciniak at the 2018 FIFA World Cup
- Born: 7 January 1981 (age 45); Płock, Poland

Domestic
Years	League	Role
2009–present	Ekstraklasa	Referee

International
Years	League	Role
2011–present	FIFA listed	Referee

Szymon Marciniak (Polish: [ˈʂɨmɔn marˈt͡ɕiɲak]; born 7 January 1981) is a Polish football referee. He has refereed the 2022 FIFA World Cup final between Argentina and France, the 2018 UEFA Super Cup between Real Madrid and Atlético Madrid, and the 2023 UEFA Champions League final between Manchester City and Inter Milan. For 2022 and 2023, he was named "The World's Best Referee" by the International Federation of Football History & Statistics (IFFHS). He is also a UEFA elite category referee.

== Early career ==
Marciniak was born in 1981 in Płock, Poland. The first sport he practiced in his youth was cycling. He changed this sport for football at the age of 15. He played in the junior squad of Wisła Płock securing the fourth place at the Polish Junior Championships with the team. He also briefly played for the German Regionalliga club VfB Annaberg-Buchholz. He began his career as a football referee at the age of 21. Initially, he combined refereeing football matches with playing as an amateur footballer. In 2006, he switched to working as a football referee professionally.

He officiated his first match in Poland's top professional league in 2009 at the GIEKSA Arena, in a game between GKS Bełchatów and Odra Wodzisław Śląski. Since then, he has refereed more than 300 matches in Ekstraklasa having been appointed the head referee in the 2016 Polish Cup final match as well as the 2017 Polish Super Cup.

As of 2021, he has given 1201 yellow cards (on average four yellow cards per game), 79 red cards and has awarded 131 penalty kicks in over 300 Ekstraklasa matches he has refereed.

== International career ==
Marciniak became a FIFA referee in 2011. The same year, he also debuted as a referee in the Europa League in the qualifying match between Aalesunds FK and Ferencvárosi TC. In 2012, he refereed his first match in the UEFA Champions League between FK Ventspils and Molde FK. He refereed at 2014 FIFA World Cup qualifiers, beginning with the Group F match between Portugal and Azerbaijan.

On 20 March 2015, he was appointed to the UEFA Elite referee list, finding himself among the top 27 football referees in Europe. On 30 June 2015, he was the referee for the 2015 UEFA European Under-21 Championship Final.

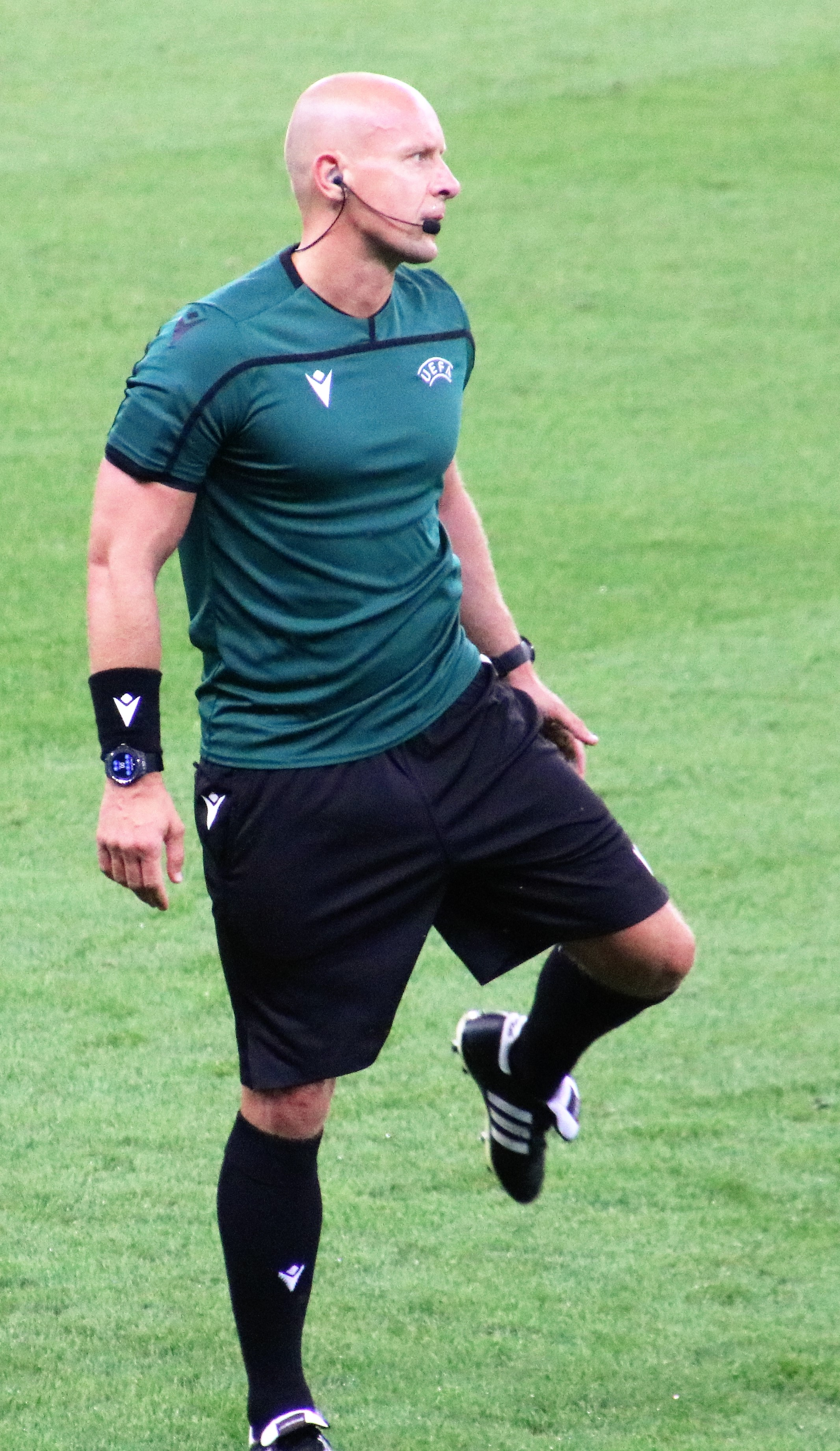
Marciniak during a pre-match warm-up in 2021

In March 2016, he refereed his first match in the knockout phase of the Champions League, a Round of 16 match between Real Madrid and AS Roma. One month later, he officiated the quarterfinal between Bayern Munich and S.L. Benfica.

He participated in the UEFA Euro 2016 and refereed three matches: Spain-Czech Republic and Iceland-Austria in the group stage of the tournament as well as Germany-Slovakia in the knockout phase.

On 29 March 2018, FIFA announced that he would officiate some matches at 2018 FIFA World Cup along with Paweł Sokolnicki and Tomasz Listkiewicz as assistant referees. He officiated two group stage matches: Argentina-Iceland and Germany-Sweden. He was also selected as the referee for the 2018 UEFA Super Cup final match between Real Madrid and Atlético Madrid.

On 15 December 2021, he was appointed to referee of the semi-final match between Qatar and Algeria (1–2) at the 2021 FIFA Arab Cup hosted by Qatar.

On 19 May 2022, he was selected to officiate matches at the 2022 FIFA World Cup. He officiated one match in the group stage (France's 2–1 win over Denmark) and one match in the Round of 16 (Argentina's 2–1 victory over Australia). On 15 December 2022, it was announced that he would officiate the World Cup final between Argentina and France, becoming the first Polish referee to do so. His performance in the final was highly praised by many commentators as well as fellow referees including Pierluigi Collina, Howard Webb, Keith Hackett, Lutz Wagner and Thorsten Kinhöfer.

On 17 May 2023, he refereed the UEFA Champions League semi-final match between Manchester City and Real Madrid (4–0). Five days later, on 22 May 2023, he was appointed to referee the 2022–23 Cypriot Cup final between AEL Limassol and Omonia on 24 May, as well as the 2023 UEFA Champions League final between Manchester City and Inter Milan on 10 June, becoming only the second referee in football history to officiate the World Cup final and the Champions League final in the same season. On 22 December 2023, Marciniak took charge of the 2023 FIFA Club World Cup Final in Jeddah between Manchester City and Fluminense FC.

At the UEFA Euro 2024, he officiated the group stage match between Belgium and Romania and a round of 16 match between Switzerland and Italy. He was also appointed the fourth official for the final match between Spain and England.

At the 2026 FIFA World Cup, Marciniak officiated the Argentina vs Algeria match on 17 June.

== Controversies ==
On 1 June 2023, it was reported that three days earlier Marciniak spoke at an entrepreneur conference co-organised by Sławomir Mentzen, a right-wing libertarian politician and leader of the Confederation Liberty and Independence in Poland, who has in the past been accused of anti-semitic and anti-LGBT statements. His attendance at the event was first disclosed by the Polish anti-racist organisation Never Again. Marciniak responded to Never Again's report by releasing a statement in which he dissociated himself from the views presented by the organizer stressing that he "always puts fair play and respect for other people first". Ultimately, UEFA announced Marciniak would remain as referee for the UEFA Champions League final scheduled for 10 June.

== Personal life ==
He has two children with wife Magdalena: a son, Bartosz (born 2003) and a daughter, Natalia (born 2012). He practices Muay Thai and plays badminton as an amateur.

In 2021, he was diagnosed with tachycardia after having recovered from COVID-19 infection, which prevented him from officiating matches at the UEFA Euro 2020.

He is the protagonist of the Canal+ documentary series entitled Sędziowie (Referees) and Na podsłuchu presenting the work of football referees. In 2022, he appeared as a guest at the Kuba Wojewódzki talk show. He also received the Personality of the Year Award in the Piłka nożna magazine plebiscite. In 2023, he appeared in the fourth episode of the 8th edition of Polsat's TV show Hell's Kitchen. Piekielna Kuchnia. The same year, he was awarded the Laude Probus Medal by the council authorities of his hometown of Płock.

== Selected matches ==
=== Major national team competitions ===
UEFA Euro 2016 – France
Date	Match	Venue	Location	Round	Result	Yellow cards	Red cards
13 June 2016	Spain – Czech Republic	Stadium de Toulouse	Toulouse	Group stage	1–0	1	0
22 June 2016	Iceland – Austria	Stade de France	Saint-Denis	Group stage	2–1	5	0
26 June 2016	Germany – Slovakia	Stade Pierre-Mauroy	Lille	Round of 16	3–0	4	0
2018 FIFA World Cup – Russia
Date	Match	Venue	Location	Round	Result	Yellow cards	Red cards
16 June 2018	Argentina – Iceland	Otkritie Arena	Moscow	Group stage	1–1	0	0
23 June 2018	Germany – Sweden	Fisht Olympic Stadium	Sochi	Group stage	2–1	4	1
2022 FIFA World Cup – Qatar
Date	Match	Venue	Location	Round	Result	Yellow cards	Red cards
26 November 2022	France – Denmark	Stadium 974	Doha	Group stage	2–1	3	0
3 December 2022	Argentina – Australia	Ahmad bin Ali Stadium	Al Rayyan	Round of 16	2–1	2	0
18 December 2022	Argentina – France	Lusail Stadium	Lusail	Final	3–3 (4–2)	7	0
UEFA Euro 2024 – Germany
Date	Match	Venue	Location	Round	Result	Yellow cards	Red cards
22 June 2024	Belgium – Romania	RheinEnergieStadion	Cologne	Group stage	2–0	3	0
29 June 2024	Switzerland – Italy	Olympiastadion	Berlin	Round of 16	2–0	3	0
2026 FIFA World Cup – Canada/United States/Mexico
Date	Match	Venue	Location	Round	Result	Yellow cards	Red cards
16 June 2026	Argentina – Algeria	Arrowhead Stadium	Kansas City	Group stage	3–0	0	0
26 June 2026	Egypt – Iran	Lumen Field	Seattle	Group stage	1–1	7	0

=== Major club competitions ===
Date	Competition	Match	Venue	Location	Round	Result	Yellow cards	Red cards
15 August 2018	2018 UEFA Super Cup Final	Real Madrid – Atlético Madrid	Lilleküla Stadium	Tallinn	Final	2–4	8	0
10 June 2023	UEFA Champions League	Manchester City – Inter Milan	Atatürk Olympic Stadium	Istanbul	Final	1–0	6	0
22 December 2023	FIFA Club World Cup	Manchester City – Fluminense FC	King Abdullah Sports City Stadium	Jeddah	Final	4–0	3	0

=== Other national team matches ===
2015 UEFA European Under-21 Championship – Czech Republic
Date	Match	Venue	Location	Round	Result	Yellow cards	Red cards
17 June 2015	Czech Republic – Denmark	Eden Aréna	Prague	Group A	1–2	2	0
21 June 2015	Italy – Portugal	Stadion Miroslava Valenty	Uherské Hradiště	Group B	0–0	4	0
30 June 2015	Sweden – Portugal	Eden Aréna	Prague	Final	0–0 (4–3)	2	0
2021 FIFA Arab Cup – Qatar
Date	Match	Venue	Location	Round	Result	Yellow cards	Red cards
30 November 2021	Qatar – Bahrain	Al Bayt Stadium	Al Khor	Group stage	1–0	6	0
4 December 2021	Lebanon – Algeria	Al Janoub Stadium	Al Wakrah	Group stage	0–2	1	2
15 December 2021	Qatar – Algeria	Al Thumama Stadium	Doha	Semi-final	1–2	4	0

== Awards ==
- IFFHS World's Best Referee: 2022, 2023
- Piłka nożna magazine Sports Personality of the Year Award: 2023
- Gold Badge for Merit to Sport: 2023
- Laude Probus Medal of the city of Płock: 2023

=== Orders ===
- Odznaka Honorowa „Zasłużony dla Mazowsza”

== See also ==
- List of FIFA international referees
- Sport in Poland
- Football in Poland

Sporting positions (Poland) Szymon Marciniak
Preceded by 2017 (Italy) Gianluca Rocchi	UEFA Super Cup Final Referee; 2018	Succeeded by 2019 (France) Stéphanie Frappart
Preceded by 2018 (Argentina) Néstor Pitana	FIFA World Cup Final Referee; 2022	Succeeded by 2026 (Slovenia) Slavko Vinčić
Preceded by 2022 (France) Clément Turpin	UEFA Champions League Final Referee; 2023	Succeeded by 2024 (Slovenia) Slavko Vinčić
Preceded by 2022 (England) Anthony Taylor	FIFA World Club Cup Final Referee; 2023	Succeeded by 2025 (Australia) Alireza Faghani
