= 2023 FIFA Club World Cup final =

Football match in Jeddah, Saudi Arabia

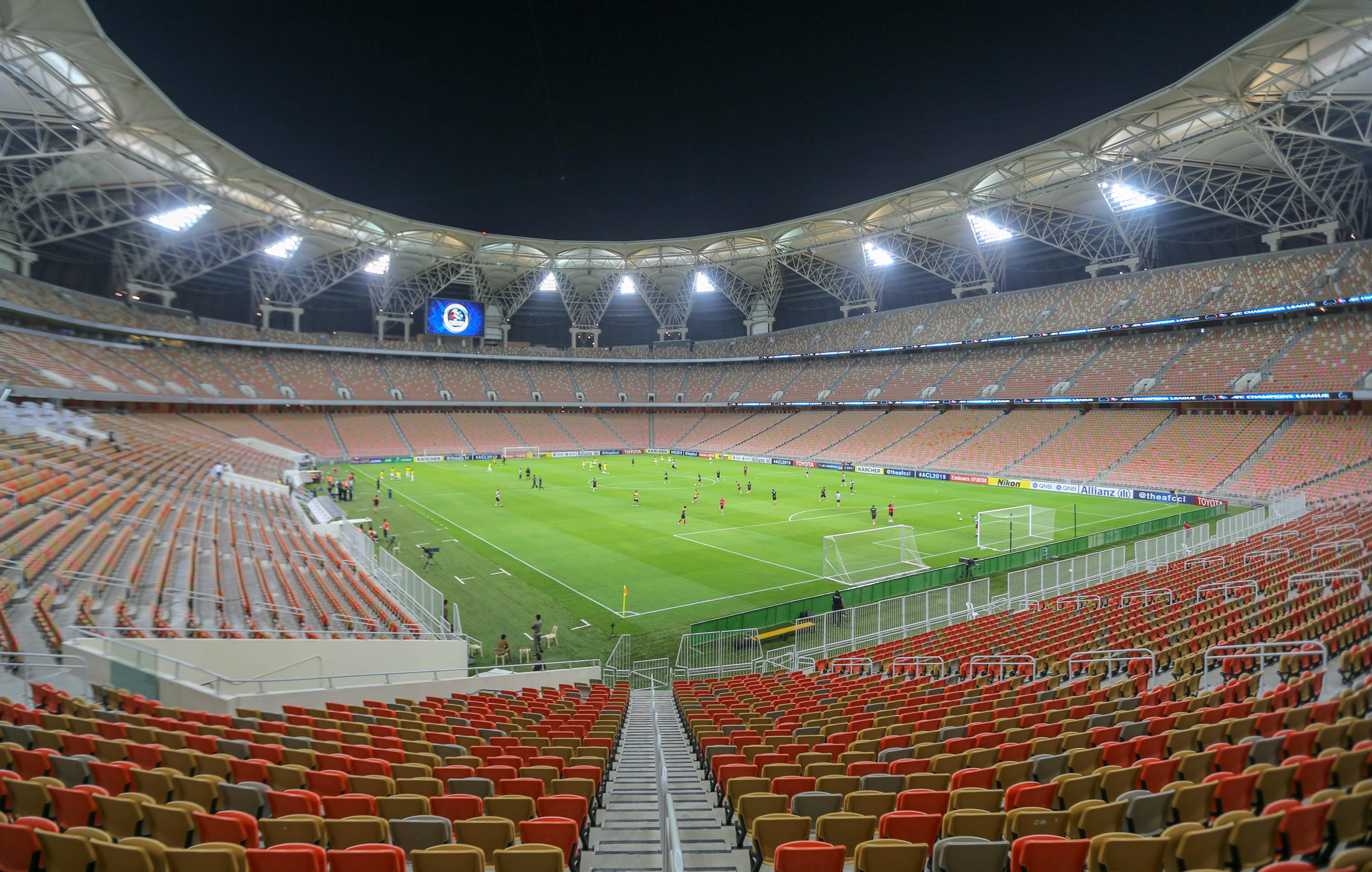
- The King Abdullah Sports City Stadium in Jeddah hosted the final.
- Event: 2023 FIFA Club World Cup
Manchester City	Fluminense
(England)	(Brazil)
4	0
- Date: 22 December 2023
- Venue: King Abdullah Sports City Stadium, Jeddah
- Man of the Match: Julián Alvarez (Manchester City)
- Referee: Szymon Marciniak (Poland)
- Attendance: 52,601
- Weather: Partly cloudy night 29 °C (84 °F); 58% humidity

The 2023 FIFA Club World Cup final was the final match of the 2023 FIFA Club World Cup, an international club football tournament hosted by Saudi Arabia. It was the 20th final of the FIFA Club World Cup, a FIFA-organised tournament between the club champions from each of the six continental confederations, as well as the host nation's league champions.

The match was played at the King Abdullah Sports City Stadium in Jeddah on 22 December 2023. It was contested by English club Manchester City, representing UEFA as the reigning champions of the UEFA Champions League, and Brazilian club Fluminense, representing CONMEBOL as the reigning champions of the Copa Libertadores.

Manchester City won the match 4–0 for their first FIFA Club World Cup title.

== Teams ==
In the following table, finals until 2005 were in the FIFA Club World Championship era, since 2006 were in the FIFA Club World Cup era.

Team	Confederation	Qualification for tournament	Previous club world championship finals (bold indicates winners)
(England) Manchester City	UEFA	Winners of the 2022–23 UEFA Champions League	None
(Brazil) Fluminense	CONMEBOL	Winners of the 2023 Copa Libertadores	None

Note: On 27 October 2017, FIFA officially recognised all the champions of the Intercontinental Cup as club world champions, in equal status to the FIFA Club World Cup.

- IC: Intercontinental Cup (1960–2004)
- FCWC: FIFA Club World Cup finals (2000, 2005–present)

== Route to the final ==
(England) Manchester City		Team	(Brazil) Fluminense	
Opponent	Result	2023 FIFA Club World Cup	Opponent	Result
(Japan) Urawa Red Diamonds	3–0	Semi-finals	(Egypt) Al Ahly	2–0

== Match ==
=== Details ===
22 December 2023
21:00

Manchester City (England)	4–0	(Brazil) Fluminense
Alvarez 1', 88'; Nino 27' (o.g.); Foden 72'	Report

King Abdullah Sports City Stadium, Jeddah
Attendance: 52,601
Referee: Szymon Marciniak (Poland)

**Manchester City**	**Fluminense**

GK	31	(Brazil) Ederson
RB	2	(England) Kyle Walker (c)
CB	3	(Portugal) Rúben Dias
CB	5	(England) John Stones	(substituted off) 74'
LB	6	(Netherlands) Nathan Aké	(substituted off) 81'
CM	82	(England) Rico Lewis	(substituted off) 60'
CM	16	(Spain) Rodri	(substituted off) 74'
RW	20	(Portugal) Bernardo Silva
AM	47	(England) Phil Foden	(substituted off) 81'
LW	10	(England) Jack Grealish
CF	19	(Argentina) Julián Alvarez
Substitutes:
GK	18	(Germany) Stefan Ortega
GK	33	(England) Scott Carson
DF	21	(Spain) Sergio Gómez
DF	24	(Croatia) Joško Gvardiol	(substituted on) 74'
DF	25	(Switzerland) Manuel Akanji	(substituted on) 74'
DF	68	(England) Max Alleyne
MF	4	(England) Kalvin Phillips
MF	8	(Croatia) Mateo Kovačić	(substituted on) 60'
MF	27	(Portugal) Matheus Nunes	(substituted on) 81'
MF	52	(Norway) Oscar Bobb	(substituted on) 81'
MF	76	(Spain) Mahamadou Susoho
FW	92	(England) Micah Hamilton
Manager:
(Spain) Pep Guardiola

GK	1	(Brazil) Fábio
RB	2	(Brazil) Samuel Xavier
CB	33	(Brazil) Nino (c)		(substituted off) 74'
CB	30	(Brazil) Felipe Melo		(substituted off) 60'
LB	12	(Brazil) Marcelo	(yellow card) 57'	(substituted off) 60'
CM	7	(Brazil) André
CM	8	(Brazil) Matheus Martinelli
RW	21	(Colombia) Jhon Arias
AM	10	(Brazil) Ganso		(substituted off) 60'
LW	11	(Brazil) Keno		(substituted off) 46'
CF	14	(Argentina) Germán Cano
Substitutes:
GK	22	(Brazil) Pedro Rangel
GK	98	(Brazil) Vitor Eudes
DF	4	(Brazil) Marlon		(substituted on) 74'
DF	23	(Brazil) Guga
DF	40	(Brazil) Diogo Barbosa		(substituted on) 60'
DF	44	(Brazil) David Braz
MF	5	(Brazil) Alexsander	(yellow card) 68'	(substituted on) 60'
MF	20	(Brazil) Danielzinho
MF	29	(Brazil) Thiago Santos
MF	45	(Brazil) Lima		(substituted on) 60'
FW	9	(Brazil) John Kennedy	(yellow card) 84'	(substituted on) 46'
FW	38	(Colombia) Yony González
Manager:
(Brazil) Fernando Diniz

Man of the Match:
Julián Alvarez (Manchester City)

Assistant referees:
Tomasz Listkiewicz (Poland)
Adam Kupsik (Poland)
Fourth official:
Jesús Valenzuela (Venezuela)
Reserve assistant referee:
Tulio Moreno (Venezuela)
Video assistant referee:
Tomasz Kwiatkowski (Poland)
Assistant video assistant referees:
Juan Soto (Venezuela)
Jorge Urrego (Venezuela)
Juan Lara (Chile)

**Match rules**

- 90 minutes.
- 30 minutes of extra time if necessary.
- Penalty shoot-out if scores still level.
- Maximum of twelve named substitutes.
- Maximum of five substitutions, with a sixth allowed in extra time. (Note: Each team was given only three opportunities to make substitutions, with a fourth opportunity in extra time, excluding substitutions made at half-time, before the start of extra time and at half-time in extra time.)
