= 2023 FIFA Club World Cup =

Football competition in Saudi Arabia

FIFA Club World Cup Saudi Arabia 2023 presented by Visit Saudi كأس العالم للأندية لكرة القدم السعودية 2023

Tournament details
- Host country: Saudi Arabia
- Dates: 12–22 December
- Teams: 7 (from 6 confederations)
- Venues: 2 (in 1 host city)

Final positions
- Champions: (England) Manchester City (1st title)
- Runners-up: (Brazil) Fluminense
- Third place: (Egypt) Al Ahly
- Fourth place: (Japan) Urawa Red Diamonds

Tournament statistics
- Matches played: 7
- Goals scored: 23 (3.29 per match)
- Attendance: 246,888 (35,270 per match)
- Top scorer(s): (Argentina) Julián Alvarez (Manchester City) (France) Karim Benzema (Al-Ittihad) (Tunisia) Ali Maâloul (Al Ahly); 2 goals each
- Best player: (Spain) Rodri (Manchester City)
- Fair play award: (Saudi Arabia) Al-Ittihad

The 2023 FIFA Club World Cup (officially titled the FIFA Club World Cup Saudi Arabia 2023 presented by Visit Saudi for sponsorship purposes) was the 20th edition of the FIFA Club World Cup and the final edition held under the previous format. Organised by FIFA, the tournament featured seven teams comprising the winners of each of the six continental confederations' top club competitions, along with the champions of the host nation's domestic league. It was held in Saudi Arabia from 12 to 22 December 2023.

Real Madrid were the defending champions, but were not able to defend their title after being eliminated in the semi-finals of the 2022–23 UEFA Champions League by eventual winners Manchester City. The English team won the edition by beating the Brazilian team Fluminense 4–0 in the final, claiming their first title. This edition marked the conclusion of the Club World Cup's seven-team format, which had been in place since the competition's inception in 2000 (with the exception of 2001 when the tournament was cancelled). It was the last before the tournament's expansion to a 32-team event beginning with the 2025 edition.

== Host appointment ==
Although an expanded, quadrennial Club World Cup was planned for 2025, FIFA confirmed on 13 February 2023 that a 2023 tournament would be held using the previous seven-team format. Earlier that month, UOL Esporte reported that Saudi Arabia were interested in hosting the 2023 and 2024 Club World Cup tournaments. On 14 February, the FIFA Council confirmed Saudi Arabia as the host for the 2023 tournament.

== Qualified teams ==
Location of the teams participating in the 2023 FIFA Club World Cup.

Team	Confederation	Qualification	Qualified date	Participation
Entering in the semi-finals
(Brazil) Fluminense	CONMEBOL	Winners of the 2023 Copa Libertadores	4 November 2023	Debut
(England) Manchester City	UEFA	Winners of the 2022–23 UEFA Champions League	10 June 2023	Debut
Entering in the second round
(Japan) Urawa Red Diamonds	AFC	Winners of the 2022 AFC Champions League	26 February 2023 (Note: Urawa Red Diamonds qualified on 26 February 2023 when Saudi Arabian club Al-Hilal were confirmed as their opponents in the final. If a team from the host country had won the AFC Champions League, the runners-up of the AFC Champions League would have been invited in place of the host league winners. Urawa Red Diamonds won the AFC Champions League on 6 May 2023, confirming their second round entrance.)	3rd (Previous: 2007, 2017)
(Egypt) Al Ahly	CAF	Winners of the 2022–23 CAF Champions League	11 June 2023	9th (Previous: 2005, 2006, 2008, 2012, 2013, 2020, 2021, 2022)
(Mexico) León	CONCACAF	Winners of the 2023 CONCACAF Champions League	4 June 2023	Debut
Entering in the first round
(New Zealand) Auckland City	OFC	Winners of the 2023 OFC Champions League	27 May 2023	11th (Previous: 2006, 2009, 2011, 2012, 2013, 2014, 2015, 2016, 2017, 2022)
(Saudi Arabia) Al-Ittihad	AFC (host)	Winners of the 2022–23 Saudi Pro League	27 May 2023	2nd (Previous: 2005)

== Venues ==
On 26 June 2023, FIFA and the Saudi Arabian Football Federation (SAFF) confirmed that all matches in the tournament would be played in the city of Jeddah in two stadiums.

Location of the host city of the 2023 FIFA Club World Cup.	Jeddah	
Location of the host city of the 2023 FIFA Club World Cup.	King Abdullah Sports City Stadium	Prince Abdullah Al-Faisal Sports City Stadium
Location of the host city of the 2023 FIFA Club World Cup.	Capacity: 62,345	Capacity: 27,000

== Match officials ==
On 3 November 2023, FIFA announced that five referees, ten assistant referees and eight video assistant referees were appointed for the tournament.

Confederation	Referees	Assistant referees	Video assistant referees
AFC	Mohammed Al-Hoish (Saudi Arabia)	Khalaf Al-Shammari (Saudi Arabia); Yasir Al-Sultan (Saudi Arabia)	Khamis Al-Marri (Qatar)
CAF	Jean-Jacques Ndala (DR Congo)	Elvis Noupue (Cameroon); Arsenio Maringule (Mozambique)	Adil Zourak (Morocco)
CONCACAF	Tori Penso (United States)	Brooke Mayo (United States); Kathryn Nesbitt (United States)	Tatiana Guzmán (Nicaragua)
CONMEBOL	Jesús Valenzuela (Venezuela)	Jorge Urrego (Venezuela); Tulio Moreno (Venezuela)	Juan Soto (Venezuela); Juan Lara (Chile)
UEFA	Szymon Marciniak (Poland)	Tomasz Listkiewicz (Poland); Adam Kupsik (Poland)	Tomasz Kwiatkowski (Poland); Alejandro Hernández Hernández (Spain); Ivan Bebek (Croatia)

One support referee was also named for the tournament.

Confederation	Support referee
OFC	Campbell-Kirk Kawana-Waugh (New Zealand)

== Squads ==
Each team had to name a 23-man squad (three of whom had to be goalkeepers). Injury replacements were allowed until 24 hours before the team's first match.

== Matches ==
If a match was tied after normal playing time:

- For elimination matches, extra time was played. If still tied after extra time, a penalty shoot-out was held to determine the winner.
- For the match for third place, no extra time would be played, and a penalty shoot-out would be held to determine the winner.

=== Bracket ===
First round
12 December – Jeddah (KASCS)
(Saudi Arabia) Al-Ittihad	3
(New Zealand) Auckland City	0

Second round
15 December – Jeddah (PAAFSCS)
(Mexico) León	0
(Japan) Urawa Red Diamonds	1
15 December – Jeddah (KASCS)
(Egypt) Al Ahly	3
(Saudi Arabia) Al-Ittihad	1

Semi-finals
19 December – Jeddah (KASCS)
(Japan) Urawa Red Diamonds	0
(England) Manchester City	3
18 December – Jeddah (KASCS)
(Brazil) Fluminense	2
(Egypt) Al Ahly	0

Final
22 December – Jeddah (KASCS)
(England) Manchester City	4
(Brazil) Fluminense	0
Match for third place
22 December – Jeddah (PAAFSCS)
(Japan) Urawa Red Diamonds	2
(Egypt) Al Ahly	4

All times are local, SAST (UTC+3).

=== First round ===
12 December 2023
21:00

Al-Ittihad (Saudi Arabia)	3–0	(New Zealand) Auckland City
Romarinho 29'; Kanté 34'; Benzema 40'	Report

King Abdullah Sports City Stadium, Jeddah
Attendance: 50,248
Referee: Tori Penso (United States)

=== Second round ===
15 December 2023
17:30

León (Mexico)	0–1	(Japan) Urawa Red Diamonds
	Report	Schalk 78'

Prince Abdullah Al-Faisal Sports City Stadium, Jeddah
Attendance: 2,525
Referee: Jean-Jacques Ndala (DR Congo)

15 December 2023
21:00

Al Ahly (Egypt)	3–1	(Saudi Arabia) Al-Ittihad
Maâloul 21' (pen.); El Shahat 59'; Ashour 62'	Report	Benzema 90+2'

King Abdullah Sports City Stadium, Jeddah
Attendance: 56,111
Referee: Jesús Valenzuela (Venezuela)

=== Semi-finals ===
18 December 2023
21:00

Fluminense (Brazil)	2–0	(Egypt) Al Ahly
Arias 71' (pen.); Kennedy 90'	Report

King Abdullah Sports City Stadium, Jeddah
Attendance: 34,986
Referee: Szymon Marciniak (Poland)

19 December 2023
21:00

Urawa Red Diamonds (Japan)	0–3	(England) Manchester City
	Report	Høibråten 45+1' (o.g.); Kovačić 52'; Silva 59'

King Abdullah Sports City Stadium, Jeddah
Attendance: 40,127
Referee: Mohammed Al Hoish (Saudi Arabia)

=== Match for third place ===
22 December 2023
17:30

Urawa Red Diamonds (Japan)	2–4	(Egypt) Al Ahly
Kanté 43'; Scholz 54' (pen.)	Report	Ibrahim 19'; Tau 25'; Koizumi 60' (o.g.); Maâloul 90+8'

Prince Abdullah Al-Faisal Sports City Stadium, Jeddah
Attendance: 10,290
Referee: Tori Penso (United States)

=== Final ===
22 December 2023
21:00

Manchester City (England)	4–0	(Brazil) Fluminense
Alvarez 1', 88'; Nino 27' (o.g.); Foden 72'	Report

King Abdullah Sports City Stadium, Jeddah
Attendance: 52,601
Referee: Szymon Marciniak (Poland)

== Goalscorers ==
Rank	Player	Team	Goals
1	(Argentina) Julián Alvarez	(England) Manchester City	2
1	(France) Karim Benzema	(Saudi Arabia) Al-Ittihad	2
1	(Tunisia) Ali Maâloul	(Egypt) Al Ahly	2
4	(Colombia) Jhon Arias	(Brazil) Fluminense	1
4	(Egypt) Emam Ashour	(Egypt) Al Ahly	1
4	(Portugal) Bernardo Silva	(England) Manchester City	1
4	(Egypt) Hussein El Shahat	(Egypt) Al Ahly	1
4	(England) Phil Foden	(England) Manchester City	1
4	(Egypt) Yasser Ibrahim	(Egypt) Al Ahly	1
4	(Guinea) José Kanté	(Japan) Urawa Red Diamonds	1
4	(France) N'Golo Kanté	(Saudi Arabia) Al-Ittihad	1
4	(Brazil) John Kennedy	(Brazil) Fluminense	1
4	(Croatia) Mateo Kovačić	(England) Manchester City	1
4	(Brazil) Romarinho	(Saudi Arabia) Al-Ittihad	1
4	(Netherlands) Alex Schalk	(Japan) Urawa Red Diamonds	1
4	(Denmark) Alexander Scholz	(Japan) Urawa Red Diamonds	1
4	(South Africa) Percy Tau	(Egypt) Al Ahly	1

1 own goal

- (Norway) Marius Høibråten (Urawa Red Diamonds, against Manchester City)
- (Japan) Yoshio Koizumi (Urawa Red Diamonds, against Al Ahly)
- (Brazil) Nino (Fluminense, against Manchester City)

== Awards ==
The following awards were given at the conclusion of the tournament. Rodri of Manchester City won the Golden Ball award.

Golden Ball	Silver Ball	Bronze Ball
(Spain) Rodri (Manchester City)	(England) Kyle Walker (Manchester City)	(Colombia) Jhon Arias (Fluminense)
FIFA Fair Play Award
(Saudi Arabia) Al-Ittihad

FIFA also named a man of the match for the best player in each game at the tournament.

Man of the Match
Match	Man of the match	Club	Opponent	Ref.
1	(France) N'Golo Kanté	(Saudi Arabia) Al-Ittihad	(New Zealand) Auckland City	
2	(Egypt) Marwan Attia	(Egypt) Al Ahly	(Saudi Arabia) Al-Ittihad	
3	(Japan) Yoshio Koizumi	(Japan) Urawa Red Diamonds	(Mexico) León	
4	(Brazil) André	(Brazil) Fluminense	(Egypt) Al Ahly	
5	(Spain) Rodri	(England) Manchester City	(Japan) Urawa Red Diamonds	
6	(Egypt) Emam Ashour	(Egypt) Al Ahly	(Japan) Urawa Red Diamonds	
7	(Argentina) Julián Alvarez	(England) Manchester City	(Brazil) Fluminense	

== Sponsorship ==
Presenting Partner

- Visit Saudi

FIFA Partners

- Adidas
- Coca-Cola
- Qatar Airways
- Visa
- Wanda Group

Tournament Supporters

- Sulaiman Al Habib Medical Group
- Jahez
- Jeddah Central
- Jeddah Historic District
- Neom
