= Jérémy Doku =

Belgian footballer (born 2002)

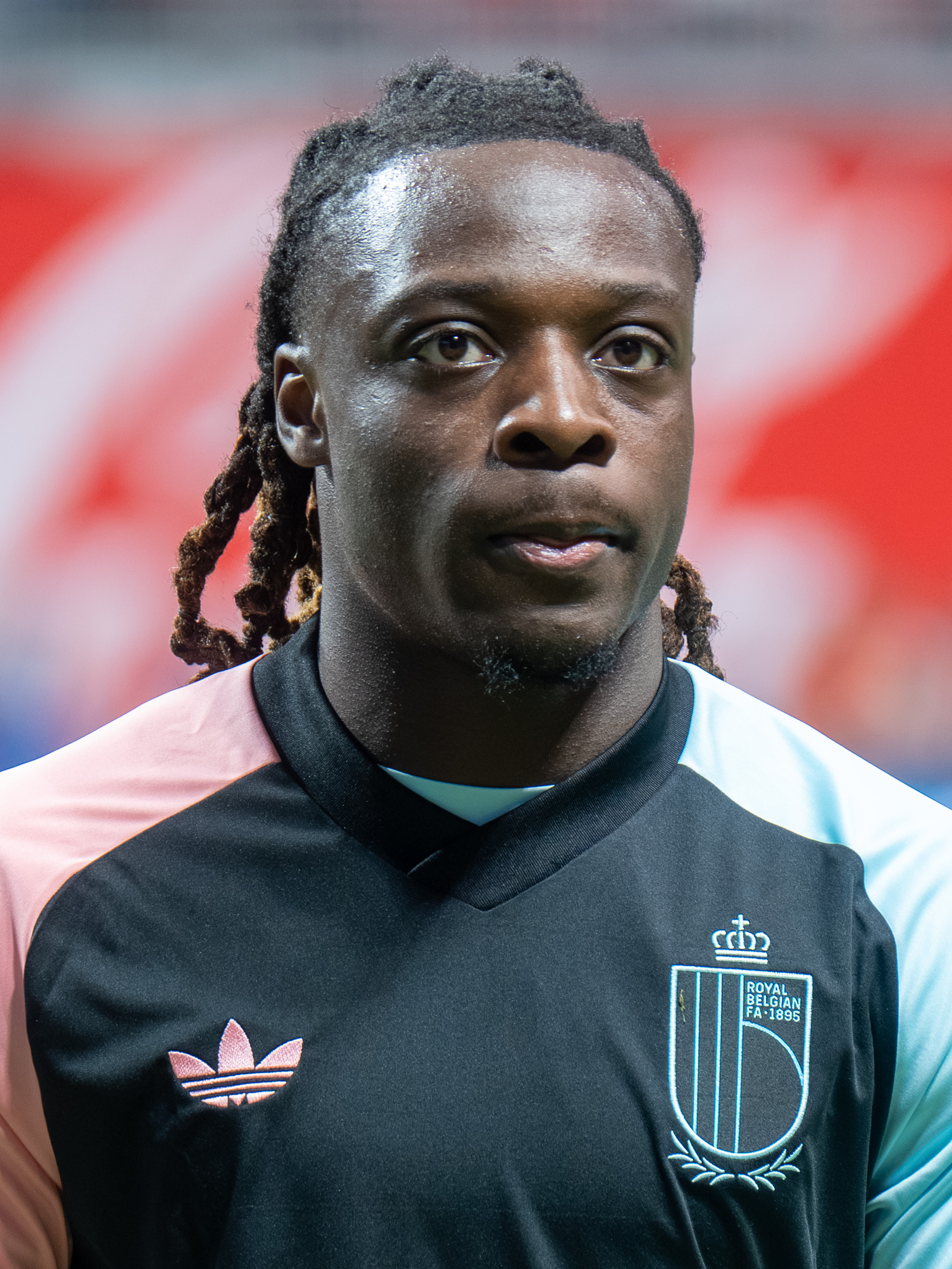
- Doku with Belgium in 2026

Personal information
- Full name: Jérémy Baffour Doku
- Date of birth: 27 May 2002 (age 24)
- Place of birth: Antwerp, Flanders, Belgium
- Height: 1.73 m (5 ft 8 in)
- Position: Winger

Team information
- Current team: Manchester City
- Number: 11

Youth career
- –2007: KVC Olympic Deurne
- 2007–2009: Tubantia Borgerhout
- 2009–2012: Beerschot
- 2012–2018: Anderlecht

Senior career*
Years	Team	Apps	(Gls)
2018–2020	Anderlecht	34	(5)
2020–2023	Rennes	75	(10)
2023–	Manchester City	90	(12)

International career^{‡}
2017	Belgium U15	5	(2)
2017–2018	Belgium U16	10	(3)
2018–2019	Belgium U17	16	(6)
2019–2022	Belgium U21	6	(1)
2020–	Belgium	50	(8)
- * Club domestic league appearances and goals as of 23:59, 12 October 2026 (UTC) ‡ National team caps and goals as of 15 November 2026 (UTC)

Jérémy Baffour Doku (French pronunciation: [ʒeʁemi bafuʁ dɔku] (Note: Consistent with his Ghanaian heritage, the name is pronounced in English rather than in French: /ˈdoʊkuː/; DOH-koo.); born 27 May 2002) is a Belgian professional footballer who plays as a winger for Premier League club Manchester City and the Belgium national team. He is primarily known for his speed and dribbling ability.

A product of various Belgian youth clubs, Doku first gained prominence at Anderlecht as a 17-year-old, before moving to Ligue 1 club Rennes in October 2020. After three seasons with the French side, Manchester City signed him in August 2023 for €65 million; he won the Premier League title in his debut season.

Since 2020, Doku has been a regular Belgian international, having represented the nation in every youth level since the under-15s, and played at two UEFA European Championships (in 2020 and 2024) and two FIFA World Cups (in 2022 and 2026).

== Club career ==
=== Anderlecht ===
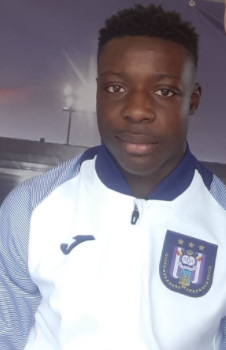
Doku with Anderlecht in 2019

Doku began playing football at a young age in Antwerp for KVC Olympic Deurne and Tubantia Borgerhout; then he played for Beerschot. Later on, he moved to Anderlecht in 2012 at the age of 10. He made his professional debut with Anderlecht in a 4–2 Belgian First Division A loss to Sint-Truiden on 25 November 2018, at the age of 16. He was the seventh-youngest player to make his professional debut for Anderlecht, aged 16 years, 5 months and 26 days.

On 1 December 2019, he scored his first professional goal in the league match against KV Oostende.

=== Rennes ===
==== 2020–2022: Debut season and injury problems ====
On 5 October 2020, Doku signed for Rennes for five years, for €26 million in addition to bonuses, becoming the most expensive signing in the history of the club. The youngster struggled to make an impact in the first months at the new club, but started to pick up his form in December, contributing two assists against Marseille and Lorient. Doku scored his first goal for Rennes on 20 March 2021, against Metz, but was sent off for a bad challenge later in the same match.

In his second season at Rennes, Doku scored one goal in Ligue 1, having been limited to only 14 appearances by various injuries. He started four matches and managed a total of 469 minutes over the course of the league campaign. On 2 January 2022, Doku scored the opening goal against Nancy in the fourth round of the Coupe de France; however, Rennes lost the match 5–4 on penalties, after the 120 minutes ended with the score 1–1.

==== 2022–2023: Return to form and departure ====
In the first part of the 2022–23 season, Doku was mostly brought on as a substitute by Rennes manager Bruno Génésio, but he returned to being a starter in the final months of the season. Following the departure of Kamaldeen Sulemana in the winter transfer window, Doku was handed the number 10 shirt, having previously worn number 11.

On 12 February 2023, in a 3–1 defeat against Toulouse, Doku played the full 90 minutes for the first time since 9 May 2021. Doku had an assist in each of the two legs of Europa League's knockout round play-off against Shakhtar Donetsk, but was unable to prevent his team from being eliminated from the tournament. On 15 April, Doku scored his first brace for Rennes in a 3–0 home victory over Reims. The two goals against Reims were the first for Doku on Rennes' home ground Roazhon Park since he arrived at the club.

On 30 April, Doku had another brace against Angers, securing his team a 4–2 win after scoring the final two goals in the second half. On 21 May, he scored the third goal in Rennes' 5–0 win away against Ajaccio, a solo effort for which he started his run with the ball towards the opposition's goal from inside his team's half. Doku finished the season with six goals in the league, helping Rennes to a fourth-place finish.

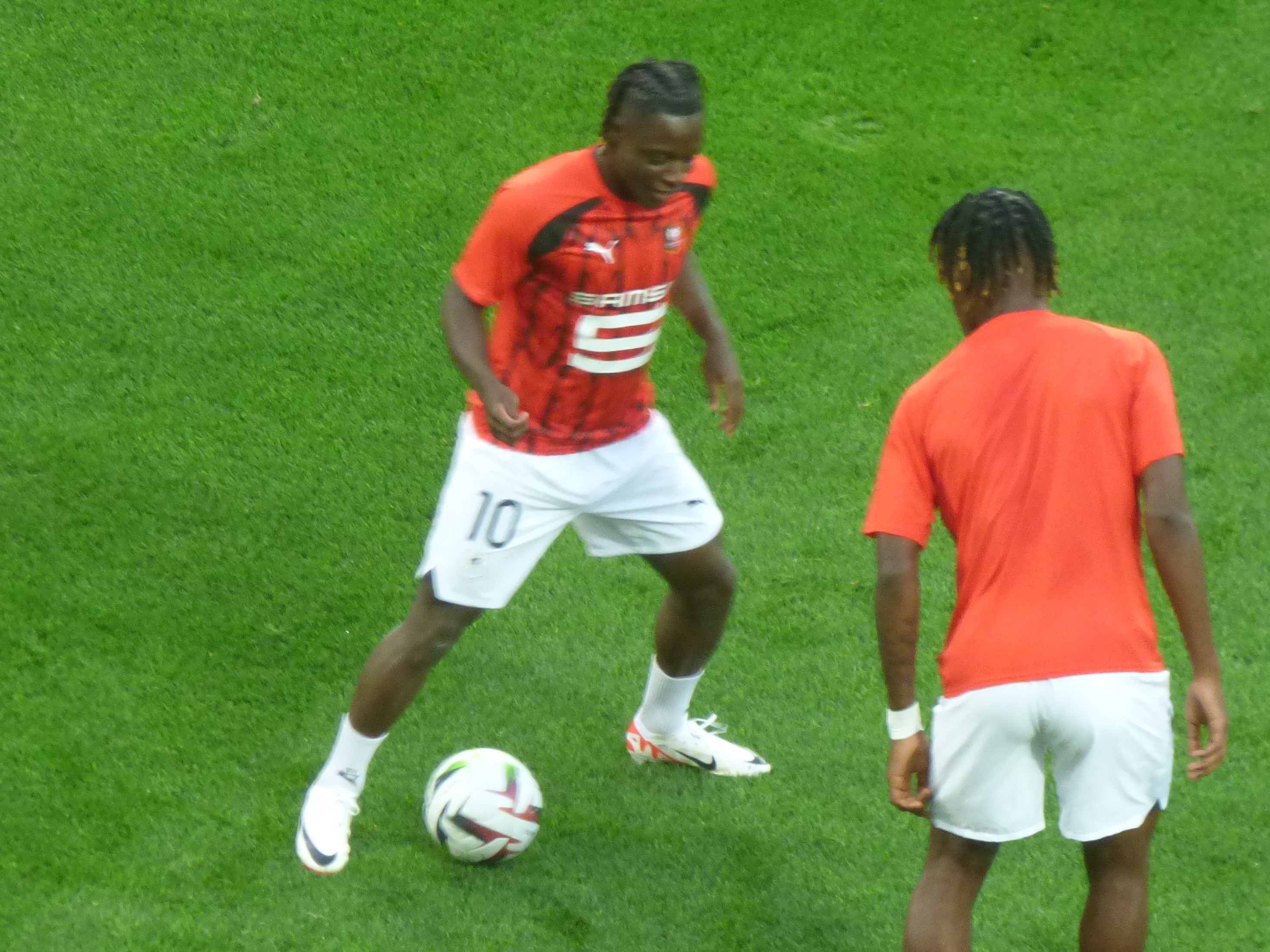
Doku warming up for his last game for Rennes, a few days before his transfer to Manchester City was officialised

On 13 August, Doku scored a goal in Rennes' 5–1 win against Metz in their first match of the 2023–24 Ligue 1 season. He played his final match for Rennes on 20 August, as a substitute in a 1–1 draw against Lens. The next day, it was reported that Rennes accepted a £55 million (€65 million) offer from English club Manchester City for the transfer of Doku to the Premier League champions. According to The Guardian, both club and player rejected an official bid from West Ham United before finalising the agreement with City.

=== Manchester City ===
==== 2023–2024: Adaptation and first league title ====
On 24 August 2023, City confirmed the signing of Doku on a five-year contract. He was presented with the number 11 shirt for the 2023–24 season. On 2 September, he made his debut for City in a 5–1 win against Fulham at the City of Manchester Stadium. On 16 September, he scored his first goal in a 3–1 away win over West Ham United. After the match, City manager Pep Guardiola stated that he did not expect that kind of performance from Doku in his second appearance for the new club, calling him a "proper winger" and further adding "the way he played today, I don't remember something like that since a long time ago".

On 4 October, Doku scored his first UEFA Champions League goal in the group game against RB Leipzig, rounding off a counterattack in stoppage time to convert Julián Álvarez's pass, sealing City's 3–1 win. The goal followed a reversal of the roles between the two players, as only a few minutes earlier Álvarez scored City's second goal from Doku's assist.

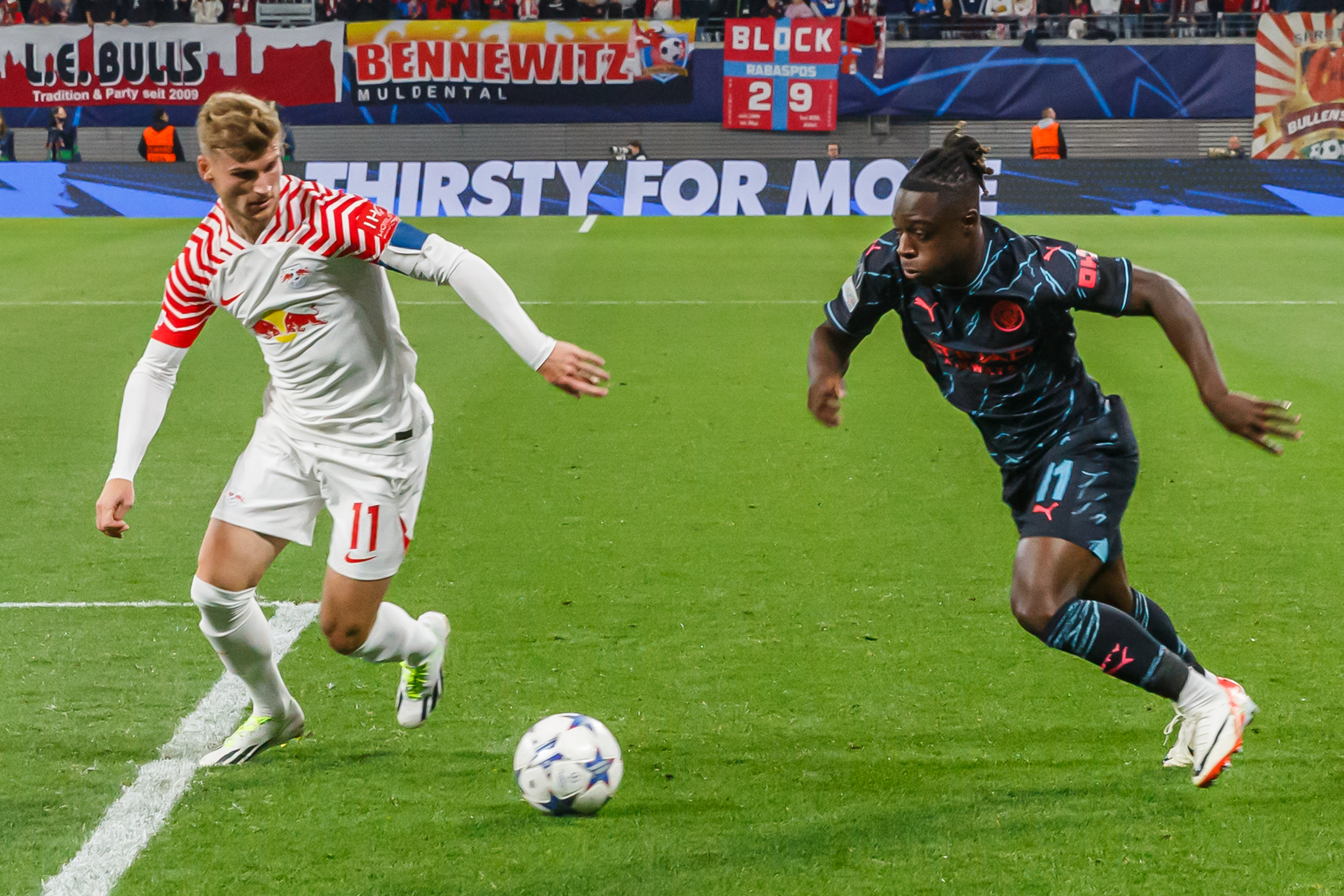
Doku (right) on the ball against RB Leipzig in a Champions League match in October 2023

Doku had another assist to Álvarez on 22 October, in the Premier League match against Brighton & Hove Albion, which City won 2–1. He was named player of the match after repeatedly beating James Milner on the left side during the game; former City player Paul Dickov commented that he "felt sorry for Milner" after the match, and that Doku looked a threat "every time he had the ball".

On 4 November, Doku scored the opening goal and added four assists in a 6–1 win over Bournemouth, becoming the youngest player in Premier League history at 21 years and 161 days of age to provide four assists and have five direct goal involvements in a single match. With the four assists, Doku tied the Premier League record for most assists in a match and was given the player of the match award for his performance. On 3 December against Tottenham, Doku suffered a hamstring injury that kept him on the sidelines for a month. On 7 January 2024, he returned in the third round of the FA Cup against Huddersfield Town, scoring the final goal in a 5–0 win for Manchester City, his first in English cup competitions.

On 13 April, Doku was voted man of the match in the 5–1 win against Luton Town, after he scored a goal, made an assist to Joško Gvardiol, and won a penalty which was converted by Erling Haaland. On 17 April, Doku entered the Champions League quarter-final return leg against Real Madrid as a substitute and made the cross for Kevin De Bruyne's equalising goal in the second half, in addition to creating several other chances. After the match Pep Guardiola stated that Doku changed the game with his chance creation. On 20 April, in the FA Cup semi-final match against Chelsea, Doku had similar impact, as once again he came on in the second half and had a major contribution in Bernardo Silva's winning goal. Former Manchester City winger Shaun Wright-Phillips had a similar comment after the match as the Manchester City manager few days earlier: "Doku coming on changed the game for us. He was fantastic, he just brings something different against the low block".

On 19 May, Doku assisted Phil Foden's second goal in Manchester City's 3–1 win against West Ham in the final match of the season, which sealed the title in the Premier League, first in Doku's career. He was one of only three players aged under 21 who had eleven or more combined league goals and assists in the 2023–24 season, together with Rasmus Højlund and Alejandro Garnacho. On 25 May, Doku scored in the FA Cup final against Manchester United, but his team lost 2–1, thus failing to lift the double.

==== 2024–2025: Sporadic contributions during team decline ====
On 24 September, Doku scored his first goal of the 2024–25 season, opening the scoreline in a 2–1 win against Watford in the third round of the Carabao Cup. On 1 October, Doku had 26 touches in the box in the 4–0 win against Slovan Bratislava in the Champions League, breaking the previous record for number of touches in the opposition's box that stood since the 2008–09 season. He made one assist to Phil Foden in the match, which he followed up in the next Premier League match on 5 October against Fulham, with a goal scored from outside the box to secure a 3–2 win. On 19 January 2025, Doku scored City's third goal and assisted Erling Haaland's fourth in the 6–0 win against Ipswich Town, eliciting praise from manager Pep Guardiola, who called his performance in the match "brilliant". However, in the same match he suffered an injury which forced him to be out for almost a month. Doku's absence has compounded an injury crisis at Manchester City, which together with ageing key players like De Bruyne, Bernardo Silva and İlkay Gündoğan has led to a sharp drop of form in Guardiola's squad, falling outside of the title race in the Premier League in the first half of the season and getting eliminated from the Champions League playoffs.

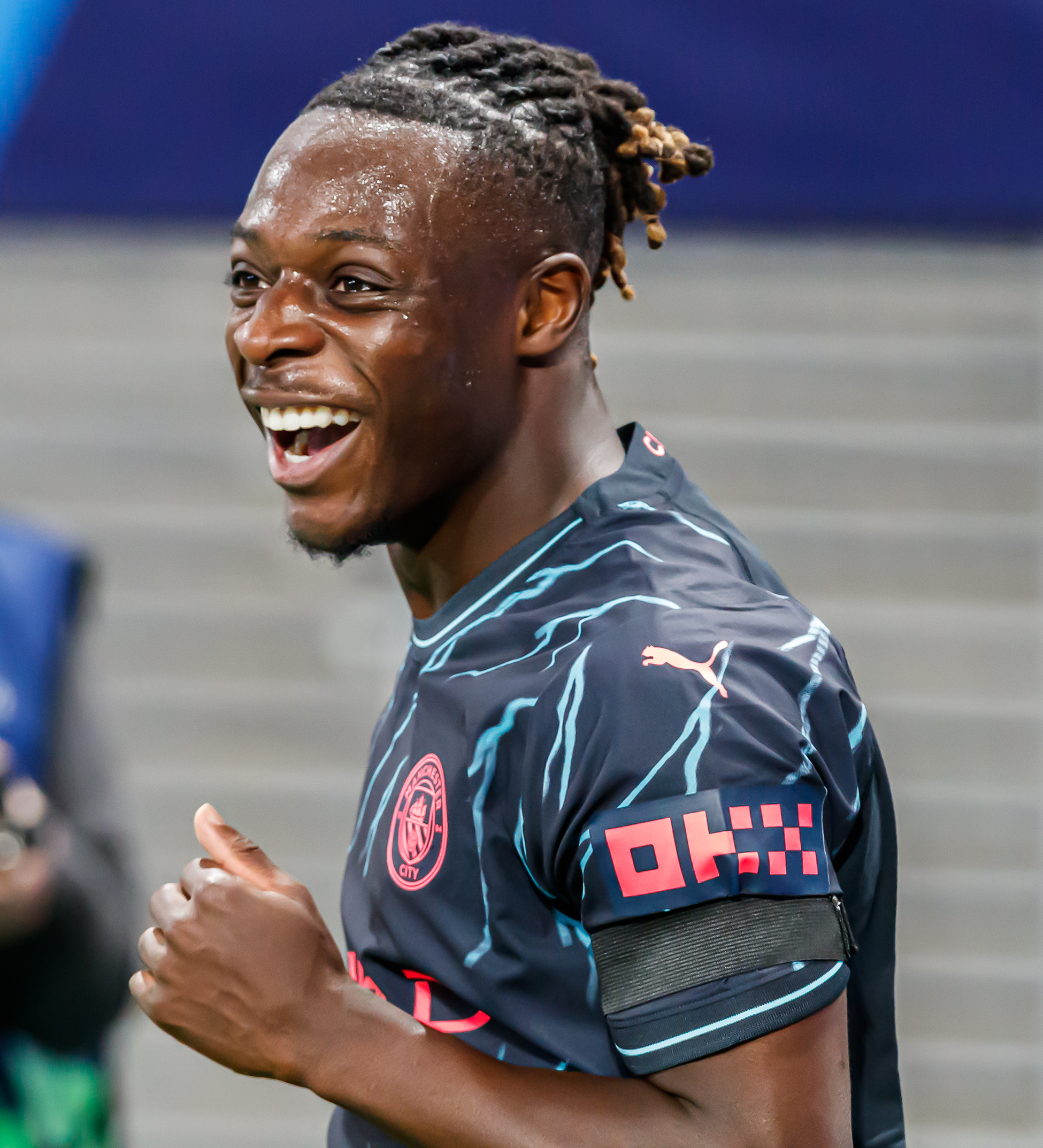
Doku with Manchester City in 2023

On 23 February 2025 in a 2–0 loss against Liverpool, Doku set a season record for completed dribbles in the Premier League with 13 successful take-ons, most of them against England international Trent Alexander-Arnold. On 27 February, Doku won the man of the match award in the 1–0 win over Tottenham, after providing an assist for Haaland's lone goal, and creating most chances in the match out any player on the pitch. On 22 April, he entered against Aston Villa in the second half and assisted Matheus Nunes' match winning goal against in extra time, helping his team make a major step in the push for a Champions League spot with the 2–1 win against a direct rival from the top of the table. Pep Guardiola stated after the match that Doku is the best player in the world in the first few meters, unstoppable in the final third, and "an incredible football player", noting that he has been unfair to Doku for not starting him in recent matches.

Doku scored two goals during Manchester City's FIFA Club World Cup campaign in June 2025, against Wydad and Juventus in the group stage. City were eliminated from the tournament in the quarterfinals by Al-Hilal. Doku finished the season with 8 goals and 11 assists in 46 matches across all competitions, while also leading the Premier League in several advanced analytics categories, like progressive carries, duels won, percentage of completed dribbles, and completed dribbles per 90 minutes, a category in which he led all of the players in Europe.

==== 2025–2026: First team regular ====
After a slow start to the season in August, entering two out of the first three Premier League matches as a substitute, and being largely ineffective from the wing, Doku switched to a more central role in Pep Guardiola's tactics in September, with more freedom to roam towards the inside spaces. The tactical adjustment yielded immediate results, as Doku assisted Foden and Haaland in the 3–0 win against city rivals Manchester United. His first assist was particularly impressive, as he received the ball in the middle and dribbled past Luke Shaw before crossing to Foden. Doku joined Haaland and James Milner as only the third player ever to record multiple assists in a single Manchester derby match.

On 18 September, Doku scored his first goal of the season in the 2–0 Champions League win against Napoli, once again providing a spectacular highlight, as he picked up the ball right in front of the box and dribbled through several opposition players before slotting past Milinković-Savić. On 27 September, Doku continued his excellent form, receiving the man of the match award against Burnley, where he made an assist to Haaland and forced an own goal by Maxime Estève in a 5–1 win. He also set the season's record for touches in the opposition's box with 21, becoming the only City player to have more than 20 touches in the opposition box in a Premier League match since Pep Guardiola took charge. For his performances in September, Doku has been voted Etihad Player of the Month by the fans.

On 29 October, Doku scored his season's first goal in the English cup competitions in a 3–1 win away at Swansea City in the EFL Cup. On 5 November, Doku was one of the top performers in the 4–1 win against Borussia Dortmund in the Champions League, providing an assist for Haaland, while also creating most chances, completing most dribbles, being the most fouled player, and winning the most duels in the match. Four days later, he scored the third goal in a 3–0 win at home against Liverpool and won the man of the match award again in his 100th appearance for the club. Against Liverpool, Doku became the first player with more than ten dribbles, more than ten duels won, more than both three chances created and three shots on target, and a goal scored in a Premier League match, since Eden Hazard in 2019. The Sporting News' Joe Wright called Doku's performance "his finest in the blue shirt", while commentator Gary Neville awarded him the Player of the Match award after only an hour played.

On 26 April 2026, Doku came off the bench in the FA Cup semifinal match against Southampton to score the equalizer and assist Nico González for the winner, helping City reach a record fourth successive FA Cup final with a 2–1 win against the Saints at Wembley. On 4 May, he scored his first Premier League brace, as he opened the scoring against Everton, and then scored a curling shot from the edge of the box in the last minute of the match to earn his side a 3–3 draw, keeping City's title chances alive. On 16 May, he won his first FA Cup as a Man City player against Chelsea, after losing the final in the previous two years.

==== 2026–2027: Contract extension ====
On 13 August 2026, Doku signed a new contract with the club until 2031. On 16 August, Doku hurt his right calf in the 3–0 loss to Arsenal in the Community Shield. After more than a month of recovering from the injury, he returned on 20 September in the 5–3 win against Sunderland, coming on as a substitute in the 75th minute and contributing to City's fifth goal scored by Erling Haaland. On 11 October, Doku once again entered from the bench in the second half against Liverpool to score his first goal of the season in a 3–0 win away at Anfield. Before his goal, he forced a red card for Ryan Gravenberch, and he also started the actions that led to the other two goals by Haaland and Cherki. Commenting on the performance later on Match of the Day, former Belgian international Toby Aldewiereld called Doku a "big star" with "incredible acceleration". Doku became the first player to score a goal, complete five dribbles and win three fouls in a Premier League match as a substitute since Eden Hazard in May 2016.

== International career ==
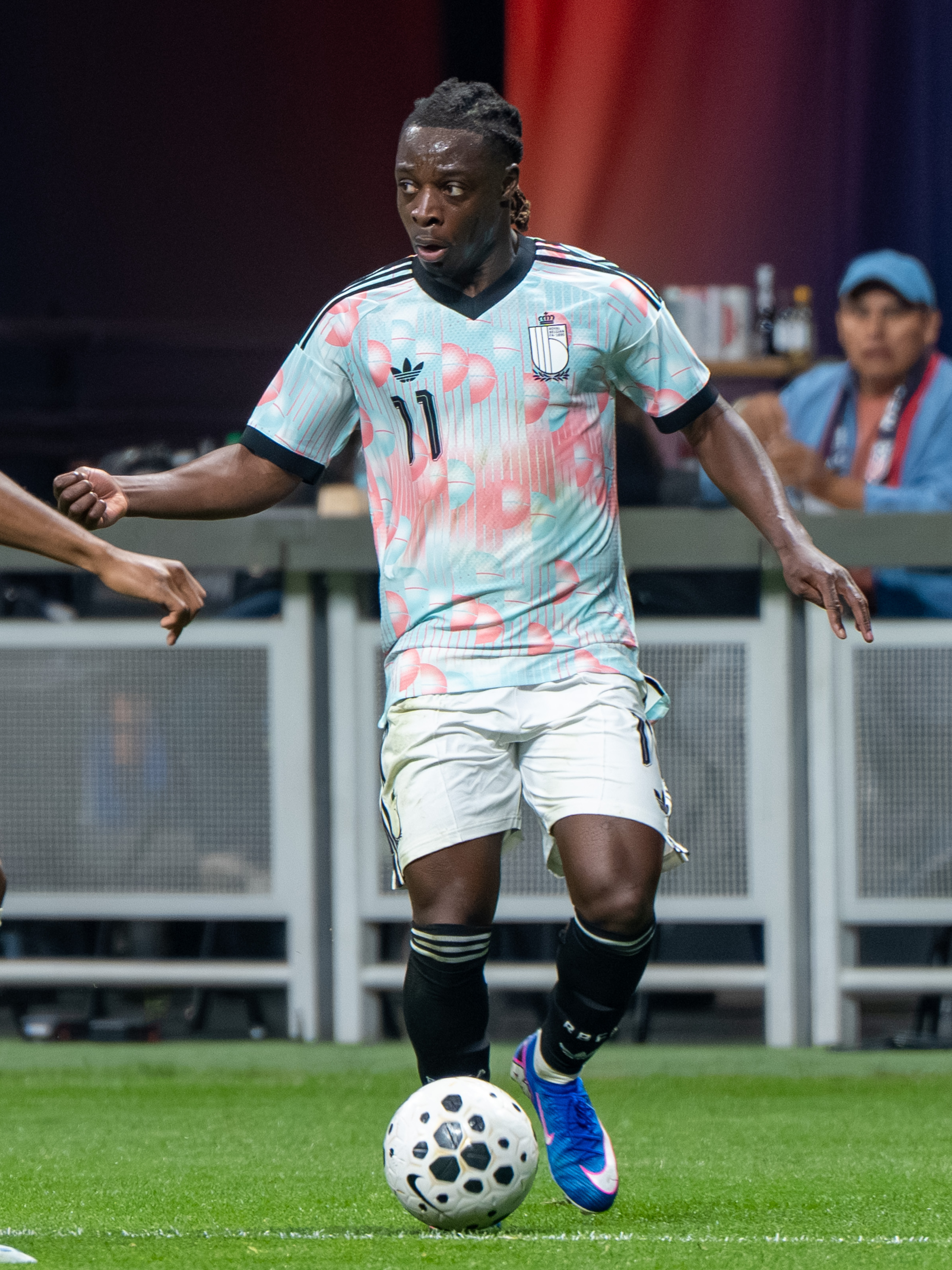
Doku playing for Belgium in 2026

=== 2017–2020: Youth level and senior team debut ===
Doku represented the Belgium U17s at the 2018 UEFA European Under-17 Championship, as well as the 2019 UEFA European Under-17 Championship. Doku made his first appearance for the Belgium national team on 5 September 2020 against Denmark in the UEFA Nations League. Three days later, he scored his first goal for the Belgium national team in a 5–1 win against Iceland.

=== 2021–2024: Early international career and first major tournaments ===
In the UEFA Euro 2020, held in June 2021, Doku was one of the substitutes for the Belgium national team in their group stage match against Denmark, and was included in the starting line-up for the subsequent game against Finland. He was again named to the starting eleven for Belgium's quarter-final 2–1 loss against Italy, where he won a penalty for his team and set the record for duels won in the tournament, as part of a performance that has since been considered his breakout moment in top-level football. In November 2022, Doku was called up by manager Roberto Martínez to the Belgium squad that would compete for the 2022 FIFA World Cup held in Qatar. He made his World Cup debut as a substitute in Belgium's final group match against Croatia.

After Eden Hazard's post-World Cup retirement from the Belgium national team, Doku was given a more prominent role in the squad by new manager Domenico Tedesco. On 12 September 2023, Doku recorded an assist in the 5–0 win over Estonia in the Group F qualifiers for the UEFA Euro 2024, and was subsequently given the man of the match award. In Belgium's next qualifying match on 13 October, against Austria, Doku helped the national team to a 3–2 win and the securing of qualification for UEFA Euro 2024, as he provided another assist for Romelu Lukaku's winning goal.

Doku was a starter in all of Belgium's UEFA Euro 2024 matches. His best performance came on 22 June 2024 in the group stage against Romania, where he once again set the tournament record for completed take-ons (9) in a single match. Despite his team's elimination in the first knockout round by France, Doku completed 34 dribbles in the tournament, more than any other player. The second best ranked Lamine Yamal had 32 dribbles while playing three more matches than Doku.

=== 2025–present: Key player in World Cup qualifiers ===
Doku with Belgium at the 2026 FIFA World Cup

On 9 June 2025, Doku scored the third goal in the 4–3 win against Wales in the World Cup 2026 qualifiers, his first goal for the national team since 30 March 2021 against Belarus. On 7 September, he scored his first brace in the Belgium shirt in the World Cup qualifying match against Kazakhstan, which the Belgians won 6–0 at home. On 19 November, Doku scored another brace and provided an assist to Charles De Ketelaere, helping Belgium to a 7–0 victory over Liechtenstein to secure their spot at the 2026 FIFA World Cup.

On 15 May 2026, Doku was selected in the 26-man squad for the 2026 FIFA World Cup. He started Belgium's opening match against Egypt, but missed the second group match against Iran due to illness, amid reports that he would temporarily leave Belgium's World Cup camp to attend the birth of his first child. He later returned to the squad in Seattle after the birth of his son. Having missed a week of training and suffering from jet lag, as well as struggling with respiratory issues, Doku failed to make an impact at the World Cup. Doku did not register a goal or assist in the tournament, as Belgium were eliminated by Spain in the quarterfinals, which led to harsh criticism from Belgian media.

== Player profile ==
=== Style of play ===
Doku with Belgium in 2026

Doku is equally comfortable playing on the left wing and on the right wing. According to The Athletic, Doku is "a ball-to-feet winger who constantly changes his positioning to present himself as a progressive passing option". Doku is naturally right-footed, but he also has a strong left foot which he often uses to shoot at the goal after cutting in from the right side or cross from the left. An extremely quick and explosive player with great acceleration, agility, balance and body strength, Doku is most known for his elite dribbling skills, flair and trickery. His low centre of gravity, body control, unpredictable footwork and rapid change of pace has helped him become one of the world's most effective forwards in one-on-one situations. Doku's signature move is the shoulder drop, putting his right foot over the ball and making a feint towards the inside, forcing the defender to lean in, followed by a sudden burst to the right, as he keeps the ball under close control. He also frequently uses a drag-back spin move when backed against defenders, turning quickly and advancing up the pitch.

As a youth player, Doku was called "arrogant" for his tendency to wait for opposition defenders to recover so he could repeatedly beat them with the ball. Doku declared himself in 2021 "the best dribbler in Ligue 1". Due to his directness, he draws a lot of fouls from opponents, having received a foul once every 35 minutes on average, resulting with him being the tenth-most-fouled player in Ligue 1 in 2023. Doku also possesses excellent vision and crossing ability, completing more than 80 per cent of his passes; however, he has been criticised for his lack of end product, having scored 9 league goals in his first three seasons at Rennes. Due to his direct playing style and African heritage, Doku has often drawn comparisons with Senegalese forward Sadio Mané. He is also frequently compared to Belgian compatriot Eden Hazard and is seen as his successor in the Belgium national team. Doku considers Hazard to be his idol. He also cited Lionel Messi and Ronaldinho as influential in the early development of his footballing profile.

=== Reception ===
The comparisons between Doku and former Liverpool player Sadio Mané were sparked by German manager Jürgen Klopp, who allegedly made the comment to Doku's father as he was trying to recruit the youngster to Premier League side Liverpool in 2017. Upon calling up Doku for UEFA Euro 2020, Belgium manager Roberto Martínez described him as "an exceptional talent who is very strong one on one". Martínez also praised Doku ahead of the World Cup in 2022, saying: "When I talk about him, I have to smile. He's one of those players who can bring magic to his game." In April 2023, former Arsenal captain Thierry Henry called Doku "extraordinary", adding that "he has never seen anyone so quick in his dribble".

Former France international Samir Nasri, who was briefly Doku's teammate at Anderlecht, described Doku as "an explosive dribbler" possessing "crazy quality" in one on one situations, predicting Doku will become one of the 20 best players in the world in the future. Former Anderlecht and Belgium forward Paul Van Himst echoed Nasri's words in October 2023 speaking for Voetbal Krant, as he anticipated Doku will become one of the best players in the world within a year. Reflecting on the player who he had known as his grandson's teammate from the U16 and U18 levels at Anderlecht, Van Himst praised Doku, stating: "He is terribly fast, has so many qualities, what is good for him is that he is an individualist, but now that he left for Manchester City he will learn to play in a team".

Profiling the player for The Athletic, Ahmed Walid said: "Whether it’s in tight spaces or in transition, Doku's ability to dribble past defenders makes them look as if they are defending at normal speed and that he is in fast forward". Belgian football commentator Sacha Tavolieri has highlighted Doku's strength and his ability to "make incredible differences over two or three meters", while Frank Eeckhout, a journalist for the Belgian daily Het Laatste Nieuws, evoking Doku's time at Anderlecht, said that "opposing players often had to commit faults to stop him and he caused quite a few yellow and red cards".

After two months of working with Doku since his transfer to Manchester City from Rennes, then-manager Pep Guardiola expressed surprise about the player's decision-making ability, saying "He reads every action and knows what to do, it's incredible how he can change the rhythm in five metres but when he is not able to do that he is able to take good decisions". Guardiola said that when Doku has the ball he always creates something for the crowd, and "everyone gets excited – myself too!". In the post-match interview after Doku recorded four assists against Bournemouth on 4 November 2023, the former FC Barcelona coach stated that "normally there are a lot of wingers that go inside, but this guy, you don't know what he's going to do".

Kevin De Bruyne called Doku "a diamond in the rough" after the forward's debut for the Belgium national team in 2020. In an interview for Belgian media outlet Eleven in 2023, Rennes and Belgium defender Arthur Theate stated that "it is impossible to defend against Jérémy Doku". In 2021, PSG star Kylian Mbappé said: "Recently, I was speaking with my father about a player who impressed me because of his speed, and that is Doku at Rennes", adding that "in five years as a professional, I have never seen someone demonstrate so much power from a standing start."

== Personal life ==
Doku was born in Antwerp, Belgium, and is of Ghanaian descent. He is the second child of David and Belinda and has one older brother and two younger sisters. His father is a former athlete, while his brother Jefferson was a part of Anderlecht's youth academy. Despite Doku's passion for football from a young age, his parents were focused on giving their youngest son an education, and he attended primary school in Antwerp and then a boarding school in Brussels while training between classes.

In August 2025, Doku got engaged to Shireen Erin Lyannda Raymond in Dubai and it was reported through his YouTube documentary. They got married in October 2025.

Their first baby, a son, was born in June 2026, with Doku briefly leaving the Belgium World Cup camp in order to be at the birth in England.

Doku is a Christian. He was baptized in September 2025.

== Career statistics ==
=== Club ===
As of match played 7 November 2026

Appearances and goals by club, season and competition
Club	Season	League			National cup (Note: Includes Belgian Cup, Coupe de France, FA Cup)		League cup (Note: Includes EFL Cup)		Europe		Other		Total	
Club	Season	Division	Apps	Goals	Apps	Goals	Apps	Goals	Apps	Goals	Apps	Goals	Apps	Goals
Anderlecht	2018–19	Belgian Pro League	6	0	0	0	—		0	0	—		6	0
Anderlecht	2019–20	Belgian Pro League	21	3	3	1	—		—		—		24	4
Anderlecht	2020–21	Belgian Pro League	7	2	—		—		—		—		7	2
Anderlecht	Total		34	5	3	1	—		0	0	—		37	6
Rennes	2020–21	Ligue 1	30	2	1	0	—		6 (Note: Appearances in UEFA Champions League)	0	—		37	2
Rennes	2021–22	Ligue 1	14	1	1	1	—		3 (Note: Appearances in UEFA Europa Conference League)	0	—		18	2
Rennes	2022–23	Ligue 1	29	6	2	1	—		4 (Note: Appearances in UEFA Europa League)	0	—		35	7
Rennes	2023–24	Ligue 1	2	1	—		—		—		—		2	1
Rennes	Total		75	10	4	2	—		13	0	—		92	12
Manchester City	2023–24	Premier League	29	3	6	2	1	0	7	1	0	0	43	6
Manchester City	2024–25	Premier League	29	3	3	2	1	1	4	0	4 (Note: One appearance in FA Community Shield, three appearances and two goals in FIFA Club World Cup)	2	41	8
Manchester City	2025–26	Premier League	30	5	5	1	3	1	9	1	—		47	8
Manchester City	2026–27	Premier League	6	1	0	0	1	0	2	0	1 (Note: Appearance in FA Community Shield)	0	10	1
Manchester City	Total		94	12	14	5	6	2	22	2	5	2	141	23
Career total			203	27	21	8	6	2	35	2	5	2	270	41

=== International ===
As of match played 15 November 2026

Appearances and goals by national team and year
National team	Year	Apps	Goals
Belgium	2020	5	1
Belgium	2021	5	1
Belgium	2022	2	0
Belgium	2023	6	0
Belgium	2024	12	0
Belgium	2025	9	5
Belgium	2026	11	1
Total		50	8

As of match played 15 November 2026
Scores and results list Belgium's goal tally first, score column indicates score after each Doku goal

List of international goals scored by Jérémy Doku
No.	Date	Venue	Opponent	Score	Result	Competition	Ref.
1	8 September 2020	King Baudouin Stadium, Brussels, Belgium	Iceland	5–1	5–1	2020–21 UEFA Nations League A	
2	30 March 2021	Den Dreef, Leuven, Belgium	Belarus	4–0	8–0	2022 FIFA World Cup qualification	
3	9 June 2025	King Baudouin Stadium, Brussels, Belgium	Wales	3–0	4–3	2026 FIFA World Cup qualification	
4	7 September 2025	Constant Vanden Stock Stadium, Brussels, Belgium	Kazakhstan	2–0	6–0	2026 FIFA World Cup qualification	
5	7 September 2025	Constant Vanden Stock Stadium, Brussels, Belgium	Kazakhstan	4–0	6–0	2026 FIFA World Cup qualification	
6	18 November 2025	Stade Maurice Dufrasne, Liège, Belgium	Liechtenstein	2–0	7–0	2026 FIFA World Cup qualification	
7	18 November 2025	Stade Maurice Dufrasne, Liège, Belgium	Liechtenstein	3–0	7–0	2026 FIFA World Cup qualification	
8	15 November 2026	King Baudouin Stadium, Brussels, Belgium	Italy	3–1	4–1	2026–27 UEFA Nations League A	

== Honours ==
Manchester City

- Premier League: 2023–24
- FA Cup: 2025–26; runner-up: 2023–24, 2024–25
- EFL Cup: 2025–26
- FA Community Shield: 2024
