= Micah Hamilton =

English footballer (born 2003)

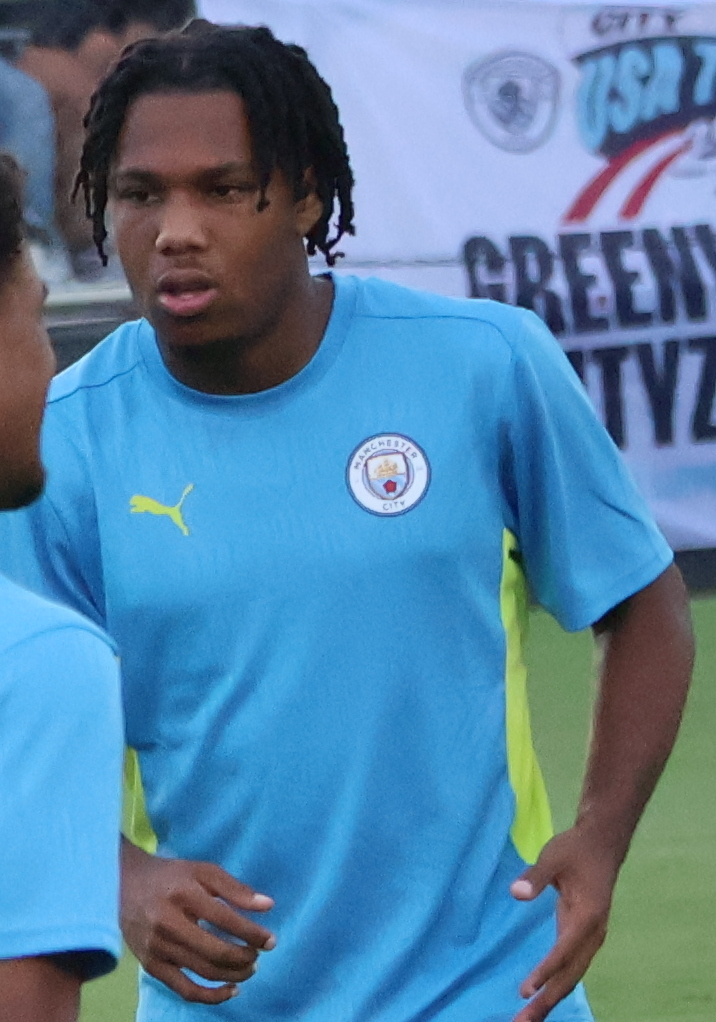
- Hamilton training with Manchester City in 2024

Personal information
- Full name: Micah Philippe Jude Hamilton
- Date of birth: 13 November 2003 (age 22)
- Place of birth: Manchester, England
- Height: 5 ft 10 in (1.77 m)
- Positions: Attacking midfielder; winger

Team information
- Current team: Middlesbrough

Youth career
- 2013–2024: Manchester City

Senior career*
Years	Team	Apps	(Gls)
2023–2024	Manchester City	0	(0)
2024–	Middlesbrough	13	(0)
2025	→ Stockport County (loan)	5	(0)

International career^{‡}
2021	England U16	3	(0)
2024	England U20	2	(0)
- * Club domestic league appearances and goals as of 11:19, 8 April 2025 (UTC) ‡ National team caps and goals as of 13:32, 27 March 2024 (UTC)

Micah Philippe Jude Hamilton (born 13 November 2003) is an English professional footballer who plays as an attacking midfielder or winger for EFL Championship club Middlesbrough.

== Club career ==
=== Manchester City ===
Micah Philippe Jude Hamilton was born on 13 November 2003 in Manchester, where he was raised. He came through the academy at Manchester City having signed with the club for the first time as a nine-year old.

On 23 September 2017, as a 13-year-old, Hamilton, operating as a ball boy for the Citizens' senior team in a Premier League match at home to Crystal Palace, was filmed receiving instructions from manager Pep Guardiola.

Hamilton was promoted from the Man City U18 side to the U21s at the start of the 2023–24 season, and represented the club in the EFL Trophy in September 2023.

Hamilton was included in the Man City first team squad for an EFL Cup tie against Newcastle United in September 2023. He made his professional debut on 13 December 2023, starting in the UEFA Champions League in the Citizens' last group stage match, away at Red Star Belgrade, scoring his first goal in the 19th minute in a 3–2 victory. He was included in the Manchester City squad that travelled to Saudi Arabia to play in the 2023 FIFA Club World Cup.

=== Middlesbrough ===
On 9 August 2024, Hamilton joined Championship club Middlesbrough on a four-year deal.

On 23 January 2025, Hamilton joined League One club Stockport County on loan until the end of the season.

Hamilton was a surprise selection in the Championship game against Blackburn Rovers on 26th December 2025, after a year out of the first team picture, but was withdrawn at half time after a disappointing first half performance.

== International career ==
Having previously represented England at U16 level, Hamilton made his debut for the England Elite League squad during a 5–1 win over Poland at the Bialystok City Stadium on 22 March 2024.

== Style of play ==
Primarily a left winger, he has also operated as a central or attacking midfielder or right winger for Manchester City's youth teams.

== Career statistics ==
As of match played 12 August 2025

Appearances and goals by club, season and competition
Club	Season	League			FA Cup		EFL Cup		Europe		Other		Total	
Club	Season	Division	Apps	Goals	Apps	Goals	Apps	Goals	Apps	Goals	Apps	Goals	Apps	Goals
Manchester City	2023–24	Premier League	0	0	1	0	0	0	2 (Note: Appearances in the UEFA Champions League)	1	—		3	1
Middlesbrough	2024–25	Championship	13	0	1	0	2	0	—		—		16	0
Middlesbrough	2025–26	Championship	4	0	0	0	1	0	—		—		5	0
Middlesbrough	2026–27	Championship	0	0	0	0	0	0	—		0	0	0	0
Middlesbrough	Total		17	0	1	0	3	0	—		—		21	0
Stockport County (loan)	2024–25	League One	5	0	0	0	0	0	—		—		5	0
Career total			22	0	2	0	3	0	2	1	0	0	29	1

== Honours ==
Manchester City

- FIFA Club World Cup: 2023
