= 2023–24 Manchester City F.C. season =

English football club season

Manchester City
2023–24 season
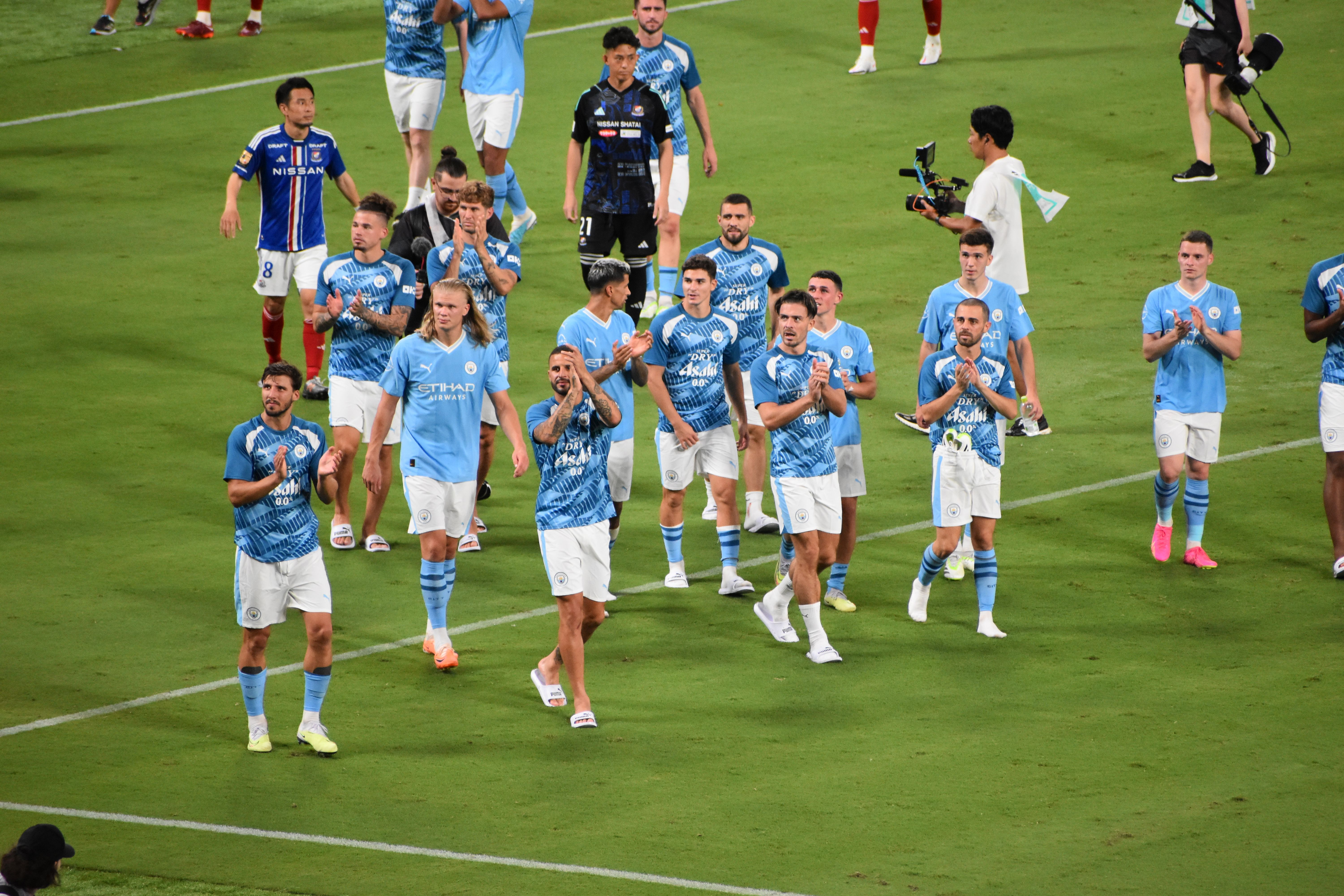
- Manchester City players applauding the fans after their friendly match against Yokohama F. Marinos, 23 July 2023
- Owner: City Football Group
- Chairman: Khaldoon Al Mubarak
- Manager: Pep Guardiola
- Stadium: City of Manchester Stadium
- Premier League: 1st
- FA Cup: Runners-up
- EFL Cup: Third round
- FA Community Shield: Runners-up
- UEFA Champions League: Quarter-finals
- UEFA Super Cup: Winners
- FIFA Club World Cup: Winners
- Top goalscorer: League: Erling Haaland (27); All: Erling Haaland (38)
- Highest home attendance: 53,544 v West Ham United, Premier League, 19 May 2024
- Lowest home attendance: 50,204 v Red Star Belgrade, Champions League, 19 September 2023
- Average home league attendance: 53,302
- Biggest win: 6–1 v Bournemouth (H), Premier League, 4 November 2023; 5–0 v Huddersfield Town (H), FA Cup, 7 January 2024
- Biggest defeat: 0–1 v Newcastle United (A), EFL Cup, 27 September 2023; 1–2 v Wolverhampton Wanderers (A), Premier League, 30 September 2023; 0–1 v Arsenal (A), Premier League, 8 October 2023; 0–1 v Aston Villa (A), Premier League, 6 December 2023; 1–2 v Manchester United (N), FA Cup, 25 May 2024
Home colours	Away colours	Third colours

The 2023–24 season was the 129th season in the existence of Manchester City Football Club and their 22nd consecutive season in the top flight of English football, where they were competing as three-time defending champions. As reigning continental treble winners, Manchester City participated in seven competitions this season, namely the Premier League, FA Cup, EFL Cup, FA Community Shield, UEFA Champions League; entering the latter for the 13th consecutive season and as defending champions for the first time; UEFA Super Cup and FIFA Club World Cup; also making their debut in the latter two tournaments.

City kicked off their unprecedented season on 6 August 2023 by losing the Community Shield for the third consecutive year, this time to Arsenal. They drew 1–1 in normal time, having conceded an equaliser in the 11th minute of injury time and lost the subsequent penalty shoot-out 4–1. As such, the Blues missed out on becoming only the third European men's club to win the sextuple. City clinched their first trophy of the season ten days later, on 16 August, in another one-off match, overcoming Sevilla on penalties after a 1–1 draw after extra time for the club's first-ever UEFA Super Cup. On 27 September, the Blues were knocked out of the League Cup in the third round by Newcastle United following a 1–0 away loss. On 22 December, City defeated Fluminense 4–0 in the Club World Cup final to win the competition for the first time, becoming the first English club to hold five major domestic and international titles simultaneously.

Manchester City's title defence in the Champions League came to an end at the quarter-final stage on 17 April 2024, when they were knocked out by Real Madrid in a penalty shoot-out after a 4–4 aggregate draw over the two legs, having met the Spanish giants in the knockout stages for the third year in a row. The Blues successfully defended their Premier League title for an unprecedented fourth straight season to become the first English men's club in history to win four consecutive top-tier titles. They fought another close title race against Arsenal, sealing the result on the final day of the season with a 3–1 victory against West Ham United at home. In the FA Cup, City once again reached the final where they lost 1–2 to local rivals Manchester United on 25 May, in a rematch of the previous year's final.

The season was the first since 2015–16 without German midfielder and former club captain İlkay Gündoğan, who departed to Barcelona at the end of his contract in the summer, although he would return to City a year later, and the first since 2016–17 and 2017–18 without center back Aymeric Laporte and forward Riyad Mahrez, who both departed to Saudi Pro League clubs Al Ahli and Al Nassr, respectively. Kyle Walker eventually replaced Gündoğan as the new club captain.

== Kits ==
Supplier: Puma / Sponsor: Etihad Airways (Front) / OKX (Sleeves)

Home	Away	Away alt.	Third
Goalkeeper 1	Goalkeeper 2	Goalkeeper 3

== Season summary ==
=== Pre-season ===
In the aftermath of their historic continental treble-winning season in 2022–23, City's main squad issues ahead of the new season were whether incumbent club captain İlkay Gündoğan would sign a new contract or leave the club on a free transfer after seven successful years; if Kyle Walker would be transferred ahead of his final contract year; whether Aymeric Laporte would be leaving for more playing time, following a season in which he had fallen down the pecking order for central defenders; and, after several years of pre-season speculation, if Bernardo Silva could attract an acceptable fee to allow him to move away from Manchester too.

It was rumoured that City were in transfer talks with Mateo Kovačić from Chelsea and with Joško Gvardiol from RB Leipzig as potential replacements for Gündoğan and Laporte, respectively.

On 21 June, it was announced that Gündoğan would be joining Barcelona on the expiration of his contract after all. His last action as a City player was therefore lifting the club's first Champions League trophy as team captain. On the same day, it was reported that Manchester City had agreed a fee with Chelsea for the transfer of Kovačić.

To further strengthen the team's midfield, City also entered a bidding race with Arsenal for West Ham's Declan Rice, a player similar in profile to Rodri. The club's first offer of £80 million guaranteed plus £10 million in add-ons was rejected by West Ham. Man City pulled out of the race to sign Rice, after West Ham rejected Arsenal's bid of £100 million plus £5 million in add-ons, instead opting to find other players to strengthen their midfield, first being linked with Celta Vigo's Gabri Veiga.

Kovačić's transfer was duly announced on 27 June, for a reported initial fee of £25m plus £5m in potential add-ons.

On 28 July, City announced Riyad Mahrez was leaving the club after five successful years to join Al-Ahli in the Saudi Professional League for a £30 million fee. He was one of many high-profile players in their thirties attracted by lucrative contract offers to join the Saudi league that summer.

The transfer of Gvardiol was confirmed on 5 August after several weeks of negotiations with Leipzig for a reported fee of €90 million (£77.5 million). The club confirmed he would take the 24 shirt number for the season, last worn by John Stones during his first year at City.

The Blues started their pre-season preparations some one to two weeks later than their main rivals to account for their late finish to the previous treble-winning campaign. City played three friendly warm-up games in a tour of Japan and South Korea, where they defeated Yokohama F. Marinos, a fellow CFG club, and Bayern Munich, but lost to Atlético Madrid.

=== Start of season ===
City suffered a defeat for the third consecutive season in their opening competitive fixture, losing the Community Shield on penalties to Arsenal after a 1–1 draw in normal time at Wembley Stadium on 6 August. Cole Palmer had scored from a wonderful curling shot in the 77th minute, but Leandro Trossard equalised in the eleventh minute of injury time when a cruel double deflection from Julián Alvarez and Manuel Akanji wrong-footed Stefan Ortega. In the subsequent penalty shoot-out, Arsenal scored all four penalties, but Kevin De Bruyne's powerful drive hit the cross-bar and Rodri's attempt was saved by Aaron Ramsdale. Losing the English equivalent of a national super cup deprived Manchester City of the opportunity to become only the third European men's club to win the sextuple.

Manchester City started their Premier League campaign with a 3–0 win over Burnley at Turf Moor. Erling Haaland scored twice, and Rodri also chipped in with a goal to seal the victory. Kevin De Bruyne was substituted in the first half, and Pep Guardiola later confirmed that he had sustained a hamstring injury which could keep him out for up to four months if surgery was needed.

On 16 August, City played Sevilla in the 2023 UEFA Super Cup, winning on penalties after a 1–1 draw in normal time and lifting the trophy for the first time in club history.

On 22 August, it was revealed that Pep Guardiola had undergone emergency back surgery and would be unavailable until recovery. During this time, assistant manager Juanma Lillo took charge, winning two games against Sheffield United away and Fulham at home by the scores of 2–1 and 5–1 respectively. The latter game included Haaland's first hat-trick of the season as he became the fastest player to score 40 Premier League goals (in just 39 games), beating the previous records set by Andrew Cole and Alan Shearer.

In the final days of the transfer window City brought in exciting Belgian winger Jérémy Doku from Rennes, to effectively replace Mahrez, and creative Portuguese midfielder Matheus Nunes from Wolverhampton Wanderers, both for fees in excess of £50 million. In the other direction, Aymeric Laporte left the club as expected to join Al Nassr in the Saudi League, João Cancelo joined Barcelona for a season-long loan, and academy graduate Cole Palmer joined Chelsea for a fee in excess of £40 million.

By the time of the first international break of the season on 3 September, City were the only remaining Premier League club with a 100% win record and topped the standings by a two-point margin. On 16 September, the Blues extended their winning start in the league to five games by defeating West Ham 3–1 at the London Stadium, with goals from new signing Jeremy Doku, Bernardo Silva and Erling Haaland.

City's winning run came to an abrupt end at St James' Park vs Newcastle United in the EFL Cup third round, with the Blues being shut out by a reinvigorated Eddie Howe side and exiting the competition at the first hurdle. This was followed by the first league defeat after six consecutive victories at Wolves, with Alvarez scoring an equalising free kick in an eventual 1–2 loss.

=== Autumn period ===
Manchester City began October with a second consecutive league defeat, this time at Arsenal, losing 0–1 due to a late Gabriel Martinelli winner. This meant the Blues had lost all three games where Rodri served a suspension for a red card he received against Nottingham Forest in September, and they dropped below unbeaten Arsenal and Tottenham in the league table. However, City's good form soon returned and they notably beat their closest rivals Manchester United 3–0 at Old Trafford in the season's first derby match and achieved the biggest winning margin so far by defeating Bournemouth 6–1 at home. The latter game included four assists and a goal from Doku, who set a new club record, equalled the Premier League record for most assists in a single match and, at the age of 21 years and 161 days, became both the youngest player in Premier League history with five goal involvements and the youngest player to assist four goals in a single game.

A comfortable 3–0 home victory against Young Boys on 7 November ensured that title holders City would participate in the knockout stages of the Champions League for the 11th consecutive season with two group games to spare.

Two league draws either side of the final autumn international break: an exciting game against Chelsea at Stamford Bridge that ended 4–4 and a 1–1 draw against Liverpool at home; left City in second place, a point behind Arsenal with a third of the season played. The Blues ended November coming back from two goals down to beat RB Leipzig 3–2 and win their Champions League group for the seventh consecutive season with a game to spare and preserve their record unbeaten streak and winning home streak in the competition.

A third consecutive league draw against Tottenham at the start of December at home was followed by City's third league defeat of the season by a single goal away to an in-form Aston Villa who moved above them in the table. The champions had now not won a league game for a month and were in fourth place in the league table, six points behind leaders Arsenal.

This barren run was finally ended at Luton on 10 December, with a 2–1 victory, despite the absence of goalscoring talisman Haaland due to injury. The final Champions League group game against Red Star Belgrade on 13 December was a dead rubber with both sides' final positions already confirmed. Guardiola used this as an opportunity to make nine changes to the team and give debuts to a few academy players and playing time to less often selected first team players. All three City goalscorers in the subsequent 3–2 victory, Micah Hamilton, Oscar Bobb and Kalvin Phillips, scored their first senior City goals, with Hamilton scoring on his first team debut, and the victory meant City had completed a Champions League group with maximum points for the first time in their history.

On 16 December, Crystal Palace were able to pull back from being two goals down to inflict City's third consecutive home league draw and fourth league draw in six games, leaving them fourth in the table and five points behind leaders Arsenal. The Blues would drop to fifth and the gap to the top widened to six points by Christmas, as City's final pre-holiday game against Brentford had been postponed due to their participation in the FIFA Club World Cup.

Manchester City travelled to Jeddah in Saudi Arabia as favourites and duly returned as world champions, having beaten AFC Champions League champions Urawa Red Diamonds 3–0 in the semi-finals and Copa Libertadores champions Fluminense 4–0 in the final to lift the trophy at their first attempt. They became the first English team to hold five major domestic and continental titles simultaneously, and Guardiola emerged as the first coach to win the Club World Cup with three separate clubs, having previously succeeded at Barcelona and Bayern Munich. City would be the last team to win the title in its current format as the competition was to be expanded from seven to 32 participating clubs for the 2025 edition.

=== Christmas and New Year ===
City came back from a goal down for the second consecutive away game to defeat Everton 3–1 on their return to domestic football on 27 December, and remained undefeated over the holiday season to end 2023 third in the league standings, five points behind leaders Liverpool with a game in hand.

The Blues kicked off their FA Cup campaign with a convincing 5–0 home victory over Huddersfield Town in the third round, with two goals from Phil Foden and an assist from Kevin De Bruyne who was returning for his first appearance since suffering a hamstring injury in August. The team's final game before the mid-winter break on 13 January saw them win 3–2 at St James' Park in an exciting encounter against Newcastle United. City came back from 1–2 down with an injury time winner from youngster Oscar Bobb and a goal and an assist from De Bruyne in a 20-minute cameo.

Kalvin Phillips was loaned to West Ham for the remainder of the season after City returned from a week of warm weather training in Abu Dhabi. On 26 January, Nathan Aké scored an 88th-minute winner to beat Spurs 1–0 away in the fourth round of the FA Cup and qualify for the last 16. This was the club's first goal at the Tottenham Hotspur Stadium, scored in City's sixth fixture there since it opened in 2019 and after 102 goal attempts.

Phil Foden scored his second senior career hat-trick as the Blues won 3–1 at Brentford's Gtech Community Stadium on 5 February. The victory put Manchester City within two points of leaders Liverpool with a game in hand.

A brace from Erling Haaland, marking the first time he scored since his return from a two-month injury lay-off, were enough to defeat Everton 2–0 at home in an early kick-off on 10 February. The win put City ahead in the league standings for the first time since October, albeit briefly until Liverpool won against Burnley later that day.

On resumption of the Champions League, City beat Copenhagen 3–1 away from home on 13 February in the first leg of the round of 16. De Bruyne scored and assisted, having contributed eight goal involvements since his return from injury four weeks before.

By the end of February, Manchester City had extended their unbeaten run to 18 games in all competitions, taking them to within a point of leaders Liverpool and a point ahead of third-placed Arsenal in what was turning out to be a three-way title race. The Blues ended the month with a convincing 6–2 victory at Kenilworth Road against Luton Town in the FA Cup fifth round. Erling Haaland scored five goals in a single match for the second time in his short City career, with Kevin De Bruyne assisting four of them.

=== Season run-in ===
City were due to face a home derby and all of the other top-four sides in a crucial run of games in March and early April, which could go a long way to decide the destination of the league title. They started with a 3–1 victory against the local rivals, coming back from a goal down after a 25-yard Marcus Rashford strike with a dominant display and a brace of well-taken Phil Foden goals. This was the first time in the Premier League era that City had come from behind to beat United and the first time in 143 competitive games that United had lost when leading at half-time. It was also Rodri's 59th consecutive appearance for City without experiencing defeat, a new Premier League record.

On 6 March, the Champions League holders swept aside Copenhagen 6–2 on aggregate to reach the quarter-finals for the seventh successive season and become the first English club to win 10 consecutive matches in the competition, and the first side in major European competition history to score 3+ goals in nine consecutive home games, a run which started with a 5–0 win over Copenhagen back in October 2022.

City drew 1–1 against Liverpool at Anfield on 10 March. The Blues had been ahead from a well-executed set piece corner that led to John Stones' first goal of the season, but Liverpool equalised via a penalty awarded after Ederson had fouled Núñez while dealing with an under hit Aké back-pass. This meant City slipped to third place, a point behind both new leaders Arsenal and Liverpool.

Two deflected goals from Bernardo Silva in the first half were enough in a comfortable 2–0 victory over Newcastle in the FA Cup quarter-finals on 16 March, taking Manchester City to the semi-finals at Wembley for a record-breaking sixth season in a row and seventh time in Guardiola's eight seasons at the club.

Arsenal held City to a 0–0 draw at the City of Manchester Stadium on 31 March, leaving the Blues in third place. However, victories against Aston Villa at home and Crystal Palace away kept pressure on the leading two clubs. These games were also notable for including Phil Foden's second hat-trick of the season, taking him to over 20 goals for the first time in his professional career; and a brace from Kevin De Bruyne which marked his 100th goal scored for the club. With Liverpool drawing at Manchester United on 7 April, City were now a point behind both Arsenal and Liverpool with seven games to go.

In the first leg of their Champions League quarter-finals against Real Madrid on 9 April at the Santiago Bernabéu, City were missing both their first choice full-backs Walker and Aké due to injuries picked up in the last international break and De Bruyne spent the entire match on the bench with a bout of gastroenteritis. Madrid players had also recently benefited from a nine-day rest, while City played two league matches at the start of April. In the game, Bernardo Silva opened the scoring with a low shot from a free kick after just two minutes, before Eduardo Camavinga and Rodrygo gave Real the lead with two deflected goals a minute apart. In the second half, City applied more pressure and levelled in the 66th minute through a Phil Foden strike from the edge of the area into the top corner and then went ahead five minutes later when Joško Gvardiol produced another stunning long range shot to score his first goal for the club. Federico Valverde's superb volley in the 79th rescued a draw for Real, and the match ended 3–3.

Manchester City moved back to lead the league table by two points after an eventful weekend on the following matchday. The Blues comfortably beat Luton 5–1 at home on 13 April as Guardiola rested several key players in anticipation of the upcoming second leg against Madrid. Both City's title rivals were then beaten the following day at home: Liverpool by Crystal Palace and Arsenal by Aston Villa.

On 17 April, City were dramatically eliminated by Real Madrid in the reverse leg at the City of Manchester Stadium. An early goal from Rodrygo was cancelled out in the 76th minute by a Kevin De Bruyne strike in a game dominated by City possession and resolute defending from Madrid. With no further goals the match ended 4–4 after extra time on aggregate and duly went to penalties. Despite Luka Modrić missing Madrid's first attempt, Los Blancos ran out 4–3 winners, with Bernardo Silva's attempted panenka being easily saved and another from substitute Kovačić also saved by keeper Andriy Lunin.

Three days later, the Blues were at Wembley Stadium to play their FA Cup semi-final against Chelsea. Chelsea forward Nicolas Jackson had several promising chances to score during the match but failed to convert them. An 84th-minute goal from Bernardo Silva eventually proved to be the difference. City would play their closest rivals Manchester United in the final for the second consecutive season, who had scraped past Coventry City in the other semi-final on penalties.

=== End of season ===
Two away wins the following week; 4–0 at Brighton and 2–0 at Nottingham Forest, respectively; ensured City remained in second place, a point behind Arsenal with a game in hand and just three games remaining for the league leaders. Liverpool's title challenge had by then been curtailed in dropping points to Everton and West Ham, leaving them in third, four points behind the Blues with a game less to play. City won all five league games in April and were by then on a club record 31 game unbeaten streak in all competitions.

Both Arsenal and City continued their winning streaks up to their penultimate games, including an Arsenal victory by 1–0 at Old Trafford, and a first City league goal and league win at the Tottenham Hotspurs Stadium in a tense 2–0 win, which included a 89th minute save by deputy goalkeeper Stefan Ortega from a Son Heung-min one on one chance which would have set the score at 1–1. Ortega had come on for an injured Ederson in the second half. Haaland scored both goals with a tap in from a Kevin De Bruyne assist and an injury time penalty after Doku had been fouled by Pedro Porro. Both games were played in front of uncertain fans of their rivals closest rivals, supposedly torn between supporting their team and hoping their rivals would be denied a title win, although United fans were far less likely to support Arsenal, owing to their own fierce rivalry with the Gunners.

These results meant City would go into the final round of fixtures two points ahead of Arsenal on points, but a goal behind on goal difference, meaning a victory against West Ham at home would be enough to secure their fourth consecutive league title but dropping points could let Arsenal back in with a victory against Everton at the Emirates Stadium.

On 3 May, Phil Foden was named FWA Footballer of the Year, the season's first top level award. On the eve of the season's penultimate matches, it was announced that Foden had been voted the Premier League Player of the Season to add to his FWA award. It was the fifth consecutive season that a City player had won this award.

A Foden goal after 74 seconds in the final league game set City on their way to what turned out to be a comfortable 3–1 victory against West Ham that sealed their historic fourth consecutive title win at the City of Manchester Stadium. Foden ended up scoring a first half brace and, although West Ham got a goal back through a stunning Mohammed Kudus bicycle kick, Rodri sealed the victory with a third goal in the 59th minute and the blues held on until the final whistle to deny Arsenal despite their late 2–1 victory at home to Everton. Haaland had won the Premier League Golden Boot award for both his inaugural seasons with his 27 league goals. Guardiola had won the Premier League Manager of the Season for the second consecutive season and the fifth time overall.

City could now go onto to become the first English club to complete consecutive league and FA Cup doubles. However, first-half goals from Alejandro Garnacho and Kobbie Mainoo were sufficient for Manchester United to deny the favourites and win 2–1 at Wembley. City had the majority of the possession throughout the game, but Guardiola was forced to make changes at half time after an innocuous first half, bringing on Jérémy Doku and sacrificing the midfield double pivot provided by Mateo Kovačić. Doku duly got a goal back in the 87th minute but City were to be denied an equaliser through a combination of good defending, the woodwork and wayward finishing. The defeat ended City's club record 35-game unbeaten run (the second-longest in league history) and Rodri's remarkable 74-game unbeaten streak in all competitions.

The following day after the FA Cup final defeat, Foden was announced as the club's Etihad Player of the Season after an online poll of fans. Foden was also awarded the PFA Players' Player of the Year award shortly after the start of the following season to give him the hat-trick of major domestic individual awards.

A total of 13 current City players were selected for squads for Euro 2024, the joint-most alongside Inter Milan, and one player was selected for the 2024 Copa América. Both competitions would be played during June and July 2024.

== First-team squad ==
As of 26 January 2024

No.	Player	Position	Nationality	Date of birth (age)	Signed from	Date signed	Fee	Contract end
Goalkeepers
18	Stefan Ortega	GK	(Germany)	6 November 1992 (aged 31)	(Germany) Arminia Bielefeld	1 July 2022	Free transfer	2025
31	Ederson	GK	(Brazil)	17 August 1993 (aged 30)	(Portugal) Benfica	1 July 2017	£34.9m	2026
33	Scott Carson	GK	(England)	2 September 1985 (aged 38)	Derby County	20 July 2021	Free transfer	2024
Defenders
2	Kyle Walker (C)	RB / CB	(England)	28 May 1990 (aged 34)	Tottenham Hotspur	14 July 2017	£45.0m	2026
3	Rúben Dias (VC)	CB	(Portugal)	14 May 1997 (aged 27)	(Portugal) Benfica	29 September 2020	£62.0m (Note: City player Nicolás Otamendi was included in the deal, bringing the transfer fee paid to £50m.)	2027
5	John Stones	CB / RB / DM	(England)	28 May 1994 (aged 30)	Everton	9 August 2016	£47.5m	2026
6	Nathan Aké	CB / LB	(Netherlands)	18 February 1995 (aged 29)	Bournemouth	5 August 2020	£40.0m	2027
21	Sergio Gómez	LB / AM	(Spain)	4 September 2000 (aged 23)	(Belgium) Anderlecht	16 August 2022	£11.0m	2026
24	Joško Gvardiol	CB / LB	(Croatia)	23 January 2002 (aged 22)	(Germany) RB Leipzig	5 August 2023	£77.5m	2028
25	Manuel Akanji	CB / RB / LB / DM	(Switzerland)	19 July 1995 (aged 28)	(Germany) Borussia Dortmund	1 September 2022	£15.0m	2027
82	Rico Lewis	RB / DM / AM	(England)	21 November 2004 (aged 19)	Academy	1 July 2022	—N/a	2028
Midfielders
8	Mateo Kovačić	DM / CM / AM	(Croatia)	6 May 1994 (aged 30)	Chelsea	27 June 2023	£25.0m	2027
10	Jack Grealish	LW / AM / RW	(England)	10 September 1995 (aged 28)	Aston Villa	5 August 2021	£100.0m	2027
11	Jérémy Doku	RW / LW / AM	(Belgium)	27 May 2002 (aged 22)	(France) Rennes	24 August 2023	£55.5m	2028
16	Rodri (VC)	DM	(Spain)	22 June 1996 (aged 28)	(Spain) Atlético Madrid	4 July 2019	£62.8m	2027
17	Kevin De Bruyne (VC)	CM / AM	(Belgium)	28 June 1991 (aged 33)	(Germany) VfL Wolfsburg	30 August 2015	£54.5m	2025
20	Bernardo Silva (VC)	CM / AM / LW / RW	(Portugal)	10 August 1994 (aged 29)	(France) Monaco	1 July 2017	£43.5m	2026
27	Matheus Nunes	CM / AM / DM / RW / LW	(Portugal)	27 August 1998 (aged 25)	Wolverhampton Wanderers	1 September 2023	£53m	2028
47	Phil Foden	AM / CM / LW / RW	(England)	28 May 2000 (aged 24)	Academy	1 July 2017	—N/a	2027
Forwards
9	Erling Haaland	ST	(Norway)	21 July 2000 (aged 23)	(Germany) Borussia Dortmund	1 July 2022	£51.2m	2027
19	Julián Alvarez	ST / AM / LW / RW / SS	(Argentina)	31 January 2000 (aged 24)	(Argentina) River Plate	31 January 2022	£14.1m	2028
52	Oscar Bobb	RW / ST	(Norway)	12 July 2003 (aged 20)	(Norway) Vålerenga	12 July 2019	—N/a	2029

Includes first team players and EDS players who train routinely with the first team and have made at least one league appearance. Ages are as of the end of the season (30th June 2024)

Key

# – Current EDS Squad player.
† – Signed in January window.
‡ – Initially signed to Academy team.

== Transfers ==
=== Transfers in ===
Date	Pos.	No.	Player	From	Fee	Team	Ref.
27 June 2023	MF	8	(Croatia) Mateo Kovačić	Chelsea	£25,000,000	First team	
1 July 2023	GK	—	(England) Spike Brits	AFC Wimbledon	Undisclosed	Academy	
5 August 2023	DF	24	(Croatia) Joško Gvardiol	(Germany) RB Leipzig	£77,500,000	First team	
24 August 2023	MF	11	(Belgium) Jérémy Doku	(France) Rennes	£55,500,000	First team	
1 September 2023	MF	27	(Portugal) Matheus Nunes	Wolverhampton Wanderers	£53,000,000	First team	
1 September 2023	DF	—	(England) Jamal Baptiste	West Ham United	Free	Academy	
25 January 2024	MF	30	(Argentina) Claudio Echeverri	(Argentina) River Plate	£12,500,000	First team	
Total					£233,500,000		

=== Transfers out ===
Date	Pos.	No.	Player	To	Fee	Team	Ref.
30 June 2023	RB	99	(England) Terrell Agyemang	Middlesbrough	Free transfer	Academy	
30 June 2023	MF	8	(Germany) İlkay Gündoğan	(Spain) Barcelona	Free transfer	First team	
30 June 2023	MF	64	(England) Rowan McDonald	(Republic of Ireland) Waterford	End of contract	Academy	
30 June 2023	DF	22	(France) Benjamin Mendy	(France) Lorient	End of contract	First team	
1 July 2023	FW	—	(Argentina) Nahuel Bustos	(Argentina) Talleres	Undisclosed	City Football Group	
6 July 2023	GK	98	(England) Josh McNamara	Southampton	Undisclosed	Academy	
7 July 2023	FW	72	(England) Morgan Rogers	Middlesbrough	Undisclosed	Academy	
8 July 2023	GK	84	(Scotland) Cieran Slicker	Ipswich Town	Undisclosed	Academy	
12 July 2023	MF	62	(Northern Ireland) Shea Charles	Southampton	£10,500,000	Academy	
14 July 2023	MF	—	(Venezuela) Yangel Herrera	(Spain) Girona	£4,300,000	City Football Group	
20 July 2023	GK	85	(England) James Trafford	Burnley	£15,000,000	Academy	
26 July 2023	FW	58	(Scotland) Adedire Mebude	(Belgium) Westerlo	£1,500,000	Academy	
28 July 2023	FW	26	(Algeria) Riyad Mahrez	(Saudi Arabia) Al-Ahli	£30,000,000	First team	
3 August 2023	FW	91	(Portugal) Carlos Forbs	(Netherlands) Ajax	£12,000,000	Academy	
15 August 2023	MF	—	(England) Jack Fletcher	Manchester United	£625,000	Academy	
15 August 2023	MF	—	(England) Tyler Fletcher	Manchester United	£625,000	Academy	
24 August 2023	DF	14	(Spain) Aymeric Laporte	(Saudi Arabia) Al Nassr	£23,600,000	First team	
1 September 2023	MF	80	(England) Cole Palmer	Chelsea	£42,500,000	First team	
1 September 2023	GK	63	(Netherlands) Mikki van Sas	(Netherlands) Feyenoord	Undisclosed	Academy	
1 September 2023	FW	—	(England) Daniel Ogwuru	Norwich City	Undisclosed	Academy	
4 January 2024	GK	13	(United States) Zack Steffen	(United States) Colorado Rapids	Undisclosed	First team	
1 February 2024	MF	—	(England) Alfie Harrison	Newcastle United	Undisclosed	Academy	
Total					£141,650,000		

=== Loans out ===
Date	Pos.	No.	Player	Loaned to	On loan until	Team	Ref.
2 July 2023	FW	48	(England) Liam Delap	Hull City	End of season	Academy	
11 July 2023	MF	50	(England) Kian Breckin	Wycombe Wanderers	4 January 2024 (Note: On 4 January, Breckin was recalled from his season-long loan at Wycombe early.)	Academy	
14 July 2023	DF	39	(Brazil) Yan Couto	(Spain) Girona	End of season	City Football Group	
14 July 2023	DF	86	(England) Callum Doyle	Leicester City	End of season	Academy	
21 July 2023	DF	–	(Burkina Faso) Issa Kaboré	Luton Town	End of season	City Football Group	
21 July 2023	DF	97	(England) Josh Wilson-Esbrand	(France) Reims	1 February 2024 (Note: On 1 February, Wilson-Esbrand was recalled from his season-long loan at Reims early.)	First team	
1 August 2023	DF	94	(England) Finley Burns	Stevenage	End of season	Academy	
7 August 2023	MF	93	(Australia) Alex Robertson	Portsmouth	End of season	Academy	
8 August 2023	FW	–	(Serbia) Filip Stevanović	(Netherlands) Waalwijk	End of season	City Football Group	
8 August 2023	DF	–	(Venezuela) Nahuel Ferraresi	(Brazil) São Paulo	31 December 2023	City Football Group	
23 August 2023	MF	32	(Argentina) Máximo Perrone	(Spain) Las Palmas	End of season	First team	
26 August 2023	DF	79	(England) Luke Mbete	(Netherlands) Den Bosch	End of season	Academy	
29 August 2023	DF	70	(England) Jadel Katongo	Peterborough United	End of season	Academy	
1 September 2023	DF	12	(England) Taylor Harwood-Bellis	Southampton	End of season	Academy	
1 September 2023	MF	69	(England) Tommy Doyle	Wolverhampton Wanderers	End of season	Academy	
1 September 2023	MF	87	(England) James McAtee	Sheffield United	End of season	First team	
1 September 2023	DF	7	(Portugal) João Cancelo	(Spain) Barcelona	End of season	First team	
1 September 2023	FW	–	(Serbia) Slobodan Tedić	Charlton Athletic	5 January 2024 (Note: On 5 January, Tedic was recalled from his season-long loan at Charlton Athletic early.)	City Football Group	
6 September 2023	DF	–	(England) Jamal Baptiste	(Belgium) Lommel	31 December 2023	Academy	
5 January 2024	MF	71	(Scotland) Lewis Fiorini	Charlton Athletic	End of season	Academy	
25 January 2024	MF	–	(Argentina) Claudio Echeverri	(Argentina) River Plate	31 December 2024	First team	
26 January 2024	MF	4	(England) Kalvin Phillips	West Ham United	End of season	First team	
1 February 2024	DF	97	(England) Josh Wilson-Esbrand	Cardiff City	End of season	First team	
12 March 2024	MF	96	(England) Ben Knight	Stockport County	End of season	Academy	

=== New contracts ===
Date	Pos.	No.	Player	Contract until	Team	Ref.
29 July 2023	DF	6	(Netherlands) Nathan Aké	2027	First team	
15 August 2023	DF	82	(England) Rico Lewis	2028	First team	
23 August 2023	MF	20	(Portugal) Bernardo Silva	2026	First team	
1 September 2023	DF	12	(England) Taylor Harwood-Bellis	2025	Academy	
14 September 2023	DF	2	(England) Kyle Walker	2026	First team	
26 February 2024	MF	52	(Norway) Oscar Bobb	2029	First team	
23 May 2024	GK	33	(England) Scott Carson	2025	First team	

== Pre-season and friendlies ==
On 20 April 2023, Manchester City announced a tour of South Korea as part of the pre-season preparations in July, where they would take on Atlético Madrid in the Coupang Play Series. This tour was the first time City visited South Korea since 1976. The club later announced that two friendlies against Yokohama F. Marinos, a fellow CFG club, and Bayern Munich, who City faced a year ago in the United States, would take place in Tokyo before the team traveled to South Korea.

23 July 2023 J.League World Challenge	Yokohama F. Marinos	3–5	Manchester City	Tokyo, Japan
19:00 JST	Anderson Lopes 27'; Matsubara 37'; Inoue 86'	Report	Stones 40'; Alvarez 43'; Haaland 52', 90+2'; Rodri 72'	Stadium: Japan National Stadium; Attendance: 61,618; Referee: Hiroki Kasahara (Japan)

26 July 2023 Friendly	Bayern Munich	1–2	Manchester City	Tokyo, Japan
19:30 JST	Tel 81'	Report	McAtee 21'; Laporte 86'	Stadium: Japan National Stadium; Attendance: 65,049; Referee: Jumpei Iida (Japan)

30 July 2023 Coupang Play Series	Manchester City	1–2	Atlético Madrid	Seoul, South Korea
20:40 KST	Gómez (yellow card) 57'; Phillips (yellow card) 76'; Dias 85'	Report	Azpilicueta (yellow card) 15'; Depay 66'; Carrasco 74'; Söyüncü (yellow card) 87'	Stadium: Seoul World Cup Stadium; Attendance: 64,185
Note: The match was delayed by 40 minutes due to heavy rain.

== Competitions ==
=== Overall record ===
Competition	First match	Last match	Starting round	Final position	Record							
Competition	First match	Last match	Starting round	Final position	Pld	W	D	L	GF	GA	GD	Win %
Premier League	11 August 2023	19 May 2024	Matchday 1	Winners	38	28	7	3	96	34	+62	73.68
FA Cup	7 January 2024	25 May 2024	Third round	Runners-up	6	5	0	1	16	4	+12	83.33
EFL Cup	27 September 2023		Third round	Third round	1	0	0	1	0	1	−1	0.00
FA Community Shield	6 August 2023		Final	Runners-up	1	0	1	0	1	1	+0	0.00
UEFA Champions League	19 September 2023	17 April 2024	Group stage	Quarter-finals	10	8	2	0	28	13	+15	80.00
UEFA Super Cup	16 August 2023		Final	Winners	1	0	1	0	1	1	+0	0.00
FIFA Club World Cup	19 December 2023	22 December 2023	Semi-finals	Winners	2	2	0	0	7	0	+7	100.00
Total					59	43	11	5	149	54	+95	72.88

Source: Soccerway

=== Premier League ===
==== League table ====
Pos	Team	Pld	W	D	L	GF	GA	GD	Pts	Qualification or relegation
1	Manchester City (C)	38	28	7	3	96	34	+62	91	Qualification for the Champions League league phase
2	Arsenal	38	28	5	5	91	29	+62	89	Qualification for the Champions League league phase
3	Liverpool	38	24	10	4	86	41	+45	82	Qualification for the Champions League league phase
4	Aston Villa	38	20	8	10	76	61	+15	68	Qualification for the Champions League league phase
5	Tottenham Hotspur	38	20	6	12	74	61	+13	66	Qualification for the Europa League league phase

Source: Premier League
Rules for classification: 1) Points; 2) Goal difference; 3) Goals scored; 4) If the champions, relegated teams or qualified teams for UEFA competitions cannot be determined by rules 1 to 3, rules 4.1 to 4.3 are applied – 4.1) Points gained in head-to-head record between such teams; 4.2) Away goals scored in head-to-head record between such teams; 4.3) Play-offs
(C) Champions

==== Results summary ====
Overall								Home						Away					
Pld	W	D	L	GF	GA	GD	Pts	W	D	L	GF	GA	GD	W	D	L	GF	GA	GD
38	28	7	3	96	34	+62	91	14	5	0	50	16	+34	14	2	3	46	18	+28

Source: Soccerway

==== Results by matchday ====
Round	1	2	3	4	5	6	7	8	9	10	11	12	13	14	15	16	17	19	20	21	22	23	24	25	18^{1}	26	27	28	30	31	32	33	29^{2}	35	36	37	34^{3}	38
Ground	A	H	A	H	A	H	A	A	H	A	H	A	H	H	A	A	H	A	H	A	H	A	H	H	H	A	H	A	H	H	A	H	A	A	H	A	A	H
Result	W	W	W	W	W	W	L	L	W	W	W	D	D	D	L	W	D	W	W	W	W	W	W	D	W	W	W	D	D	W	W	W	W	W	W	W	W	W
Position	3	2	1	1	1	1	1	3	2	3	1	1	2	3	4	4	4	4	3	2	2	2	2	3	2	2	2	3	3	3	3	1	2	2	2	2	1	1
Points	3	6	9	12	15	18	18	18	21	24	27	28	29	30	30	33	34	37	40	43	46	49	52	53	56	59	62	63	64	67	70	73	76	79	82	85	88	91

Source: Premier League
A = Away; H = Home; W = Win; D = Draw; L = Loss; P = Postponed
Notes:
- Positions show the situation at the end of the corresponding Game Weeks (GW), not the position at the conclusion of matches or game days.

^{1} Matchday 18 (vs Brentford) was postponed to 20 February 2024 due to Manchester City's participation in the FIFA Club World Cup.
^{2} Matchday 29 (vs Brighton and Hove Albion) was postponed to 24 April 2024 to accommodate Manchester City's FA Cup quarter-final fixture against Newcastle.
^{3} Matchday 34 (vs Tottenham Hotspur) was postponed to 14 May 2024 to accommodate Manchester City's FA Cup semi-final fixture against Chelsea.

==== Matches ====
The league fixtures were released on 15 June 2023. (Note: Note: The Premier League website includes a number of incorrect attendance figures, which may have been based upon best-guesses, as City rarely released attendance figures to the public following (and including) the Burnley home game early in 2024. The attendance figures included in the statistics below are taken from the official Manchester City match programme from the game against West Ham United on 19 May 2024. The crowd figure against West Ham has been estimated based upon stadium capacity and has yet to be verified by Manchester City. For further evidence of the above, reported attendances of 55,097 for the Manchester United and West Ham home games significantly exceed the stadium's current working capacity and have seemingly been estimated by unknown sources using an outdated capacity that includes a number of since removed seats and others that were unsold due to segregation issues.)

Win Draw Loss

11 August 2023 1	Burnley	0–3	Manchester City	Burnley
20:00 BST	Zaroury (red card) 90+4'	Report	Haaland 4', 36'; Rodri 75'	Stadium: Turf Moor; Attendance: 21,572; Referee: Craig Pawson
Note: Live on Sky Sports

19 August 2023 2	Manchester City	1–0	Newcastle United	Manchester
20:00 BST	Alvarez 31', (yellow card) 46'	Report	Gordon (yellow card) 24'; Tonali (yellow card) 34'; Joelinton (yellow card) 54'; Barnes (yellow card) 58'; Bruno Guimarães (yellow card) 71'	Stadium: City of Manchester Stadium; Attendance: 53,080; Referee: Robert Jones

27 August 2023 3	Sheffield United	1–2	Manchester City	Sheffield
14:00 BST	Baldock (yellow card) 45+4'; Osula (yellow card) 59'; Vinícius (yellow card) 77'; Egan (yellow card) 83'; Bogle 85'	Report	Haaland (penalty missed) 37', 63'; Rodri 88'	Stadium: Bramall Lane; Attendance: 31,336; Referee: Jarred Gillett

2 September 2023 4	Manchester City	5–1	Fulham	Manchester
15:00 BST	Alvarez 31'; Rodri (yellow card) 41'; Aké 45+5'; Haaland 58', 70' (pen.), 90+5'; Silva (yellow card) 78'	Report	Ream 33'; Diop (yellow card) 43'; Robinson (yellow card) 45+3'; Decordova-Reid (yellow card) 54'; Pereira (yellow card) 69'	Stadium: City of Manchester Stadium; Attendance: 52,899; Referee: Michael Oliver

16 September 2023 5	West Ham United	1–3	Manchester City	Stratford
15:00 BST	Ward-Prowse 36'; Álvarez (yellow card) 38'; Souček (yellow card) 79'; Paquetá (yellow card) 90+6'	Report	Gvardiol (yellow card) 45+2'; Doku 46'; Silva 76'; Haaland 86'; Rodri (yellow card) 90'	Stadium: London Stadium; Attendance: 62,475; Referee: Andrew Madley

23 September 2023 6	Manchester City	2–0	Nottingham Forest	Manchester
15:00 BST	Foden 7'; Haaland 14'; Akanji (yellow card) 18'; Rodri (red card) 46'; Ederson (yellow card) 58'; Grealish (yellow card) 90+3'	Report	Tavares (yellow card) 21'; Sangaré (yellow card) 45+1'; Gibbs-White (yellow card) 46'; Awoniyi (yellow card) 58'; Mangala (yellow card) 77'; Origi (yellow card) 81'; Montiel (yellow card) 90+3'	Stadium: City of Manchester Stadium; Attendance: 53,413; Referee: Anthony Taylor

30 September 2023 7	Wolverhampton Wanderers	2–1	Manchester City	Wolverhampton
15:00 BST	Dias 13' (o.g.); Hwang Hee-chan (yellow card) 24', (goal) 66'; Lemina (yellow card) 39'; Neto (yellow card) 57'; Sá (yellow card) 83'; Silva (yellow card) 90+3'	Report	Walker (yellow card) 17'; Alvarez 58', (yellow card) 63'; Kovačić (yellow card) 59'; Doku (yellow card) 82'	Stadium: Molineux Stadium; Attendance: 31,415; Referee: Craig Pawson

8 October 2023 8	Arsenal	1–0	Manchester City	Holloway
16:30 BST	Jorginho (yellow card) 11'; Martinelli 86'; Gabriel Jesus (yellow card) 90+3'	Report	Silva (yellow card) 23'; Kovačić (yellow card) 29'; Ederson (yellow card) 90+3'	Stadium: Emirates Stadium; Attendance: 60,233; Referee: Michael Oliver

21 October 2023 9	Manchester City	2–1	Brighton & Hove Albion	Manchester
15:00 BST	Alvarez 7'; Haaland 19'; Rodri (yellow card) 38'; Akanji (yellow card) 63' (yellow-red card) 90+5'; Grealish (yellow card) 84'	Report	March (yellow card) 36'; Igor (yellow card) 64'; Fati 73'	Stadium: City of Manchester Stadium; Attendance: 53,466; Referee: Robert Jones

29 October 2023 10	Manchester United	0–3	Manchester City	Trafford
15:30 GMT	Onana (yellow card) 26'; Amrabat (yellow card) 42'; Antony (yellow card) 90+2'; Fernandes (yellow card) 90+3'	Report	Haaland 26' (pen.), 49'; Foden (yellow card) 42', (goal) 80'	Stadium: Old Trafford; Attendance: 73,502; Referee: Paul Tierney

4 November 2023 11	Manchester City	6–1	Bournemouth	Manchester
15:00 GMT	Doku 30'; Silva 33', 83'; Akanji 37'; Foden 64'; Aké 88'	Report	Billing (yellow card) 32'; Sinisterra 74'	Stadium: City of Manchester Stadium; Attendance: 53,358; Referee: Craig Pawson

12 November 2023 12	Chelsea	4–4	Manchester City	Fulham
16:30 GMT	Cucurella (yellow card) 22'; Palmer (yellow card) 23', (goal) 90+5' (pen.); Silva 29'; Sterling 37', (yellow card) 90+7'; Caicedo (yellow card) 60'; Jackson 67', (yellow card) 90+4'	Report	Haaland 25' (pen.), 47'; Akanji 45+1'; Doku (yellow card) 56'; Rodri (yellow card) 72', (goal) 86'; Grealish (yellow card) 90+4'	Stadium: Stamford Bridge; Attendance: 39,532; Referee: Anthony Taylor

25 November 2023 13	Manchester City	1–1	Liverpool	Manchester
12:30 GMT	Haaland 27'; Silva (yellow card) 89'	Report	Núñez (yellow card) 75'; Alexander-Arnold 80'; Matip (yellow card) 86'; Endō (yellow card) 90+3'	Stadium: City of Manchester Stadium; Attendance: 53,289; Referee: Chris Kavanagh

3 December 2023 14	Manchester City	3–3	Tottenham Hotspur	Manchester
16:30 GMT	Son Heung-min 9' (o.g.); Foden 31'; Rodri (yellow card) 34'; Grealish (yellow card) 61', (goal) 81'; Gvardiol (yellow card) 84'; Haaland (yellow card) 90+5'	Report	Son Heung-min 6'; Udogie (yellow card) 38'; Lo Celso 69'; Porro (yellow card) 74'; Kulusevski 90', (yellow card) 90+2'; Emerson (yellow card) 90+5'	Stadium: City of Manchester Stadium; Attendance: 53,473; Referee: Simon Hooper

6 December 2023 15	Aston Villa	1–0	Manchester City	Birmingham
20:15 GMT	Watkins (yellow card) 60'; Bailey 74'; Kamara (yellow card) 87'	Report	Stones (yellow card) 45'; Lewis (yellow card) 53'	Stadium: Villa Park; Attendance: 41,421; Referee: John Brooks
Note: Live on Amazon Prime Video

10 December 2023 16	Luton Town	1–2	Manchester City	Luton
14:00 GMT	Adebayo 45+2'; Nakamba (yellow card) 58'; Doughty (yellow card) 77'	Report	Silva 62'; Grealish 65'; Rodri (yellow card) 73'	Stadium: Kenilworth Road; Attendance: 11,047; Referee: Tim Robinson
Note: Live on Sky Sports

16 December 2023 17	Manchester City	2–2	Crystal Palace	Manchester
15:00 GMT	Grealish 24'; Ederson (yellow card) 42'; Lewis 54'	Report	Andersen (yellow card) 40'; Mateta 76'; Olise 90+5' (pen.)	Stadium: City of Manchester Stadium; Attendance: 53,112; Referee: Paul Tierney

27 December 2023 19	Everton	1–3	Manchester City	Liverpool
20:15 GMT	Harrison 29'; Patterson (yellow card) 39'; Gomes (yellow card) 60'; Pickford (yellow card) 63'; Branthwaite (yellow card) 78'	Report	Foden 53'; Akanji (yellow card) 59'; Alvarez 64' (pen.); Grealish (yellow card) 81'; Silva 86'	Stadium: Goodison Park; Attendance: 39,327; Referee: John Brooks

30 December 2023 20	Manchester City	2–0	Sheffield United	Manchester
15:00 GMT	Rodri 14'; Kovačić (yellow card) 43'; Alvarez 61'	Report	Bogle (yellow card) 89'	Stadium: City of Manchester Stadium; Attendance: 53,108; Referee: David Coote

13 January 2024 21	Newcastle United	2–3	Manchester City	Newcastle upon Tyne
17:30 GMT	Bruno Guimarães (yellow card) 21'; Isak 35'; Gordon 37'	Report	Silva 26', (yellow card) 55'; Rodri (yellow card) 45+4'; De Bruyne 74'; Bobb 90+1'	Stadium: St James' Park; Attendance: 52,190; Referee: Chris Kavanagh

31 January 2024 22	Manchester City	3–1	Burnley	Manchester
19:30 GMT	Alvarez 16', 22'; Rodri 46'; Ederson (yellow card) 75'; Doku (yellow card) 81'	Report	Ekdal (yellow card) 21'; Roberts (yellow card) 75'; Al-Dakhil 90+3'	Stadium: City of Manchester Stadium; Attendance: 53,099; Referee: Sam Barrott

5 February 2024 23	Brentford	1–3	Manchester City	Brentford
20:00 GMT	Maupay 21', (yellow card) 31'	Report	Foden 45+3', 53', 70'	Stadium: Brentford Community Stadium; Attendance: 17,096; Referee: Jarred Gillett

10 February 2024 24	Manchester City	2–0	Everton	Manchester
12:30 GMT	Haaland 71', 85'	Report	Gueye (yellow card) 54'; Garner (yellow card) 90+7'	Stadium: City of Manchester Stadium; Attendance: 53,469; Referee: John Brooks

17 February 2024 25	Manchester City	1–1	Chelsea	Manchester
17:30 GMT	Rodri 83'; Silva (yellow card) 85'	Report	Caicedo (yellow card) 35'; Sterling 42'; Palmer (yellow card) 60'; Petrović (yellow card) 63'	Stadium: City of Manchester Stadium; Attendance: 53,509; Referee: Andrew Madley

20 February 2024 18	Manchester City	1–0	Brentford	Manchester
19:30 GMT	Stones (yellow card) 45+2'; Haaland 71'; Walker (yellow card) 82'	Report	Mee (yellow card) 45+2'; Wissa (yellow card) 60'; Toney (yellow card) 68'; Flekken (yellow card) 90+6'	Stadium: City of Manchester Stadium; Attendance: 52,137; Referee: Darren England
Note: The match was rescheduled due to Manchester City's participation in the FIFA Club World Cup.

24 February 2024 26	Bournemouth	0–1	Manchester City	Bournemouth
17:30 GMT	Cook (yellow card) 38'; Senesi (yellow card) 70'	Report	Foden 24'; Silva (yellow card) 87'; De Bruyne (yellow card) 90+6'	Stadium: Dean Court; Attendance: 11,184; Referee: Jarred Gillett

3 March 2024 27	Manchester City	3–1	Manchester United	Manchester
15:30 GMT	Foden 56', 80'; Haaland 90+1'	Report	Rashford 8'; Varane (yellow card) 68'	Stadium: City of Manchester Stadium; Attendance: 53,521; Referee: Andrew Madley
Note: The match was originally scheduled for 2 March 2024 but later was moved back for live Sky Sports coverage.

10 March 2024 28	Liverpool	1–1	Manchester City	Liverpool
15:45 GMT	Mac Allister 50' (pen.)	Report	Stones 23'; Rodri (yellow card) 45+2'; Ederson (yellow card) 47'; Silva (yellow card) 59'	Stadium: Anfield; Attendance: 59,947; Referee: Michael Oliver
Note: The match was originally scheduled for 9 March 2024 but was later pushed back for live Sky Sports coverage.

31 March 2024 30	Manchester City	0–0	Arsenal	Manchester
16:30 BST		Report	Gabriel Jesus (yellow card) 67'; Raya (yellow card) 79'	Stadium: City of Manchester Stadium; Attendance: 53,533; Referee: Anthony Taylor
Note: The match was originally scheduled for 30 March 2024 but was later pushed back for live Sky Sports coverage.

3 April 2024 31	Manchester City	4–1	Aston Villa	Manchester
20:15 BST	Rodri 11'; Grealish (yellow card) 32'; Foden 45+1', 62', 69'	Report	Durán 20'; Douglas Luiz (yellow card) 38'; Chambers (yellow card) 90+4'	Stadium: City of Manchester Stadium; Attendance: 53,422; Referee: Darren England

6 April 2024 32	Crystal Palace	2–4	Manchester City	Selhurst
12:30 BST	Mateta 3', (yellow card) 62'; Édouard 86'	Report	De Bruyne 13', 70'; Gvardiol (yellow card) 45+2'; Lewis 47'; Haaland 66'	Stadium: Selhurst Park; Attendance: 25,132; Referee: Paul Tierney
Note: Fixture was initially scheduled for a 15:00 kick-off, but was moved for live TNT Sports broadcast.

13 April 2024 33	Manchester City	5–1	Luton Town	Manchester
15:00 BST	Hashioka 2' (o.g.); De Bruyne (yellow card) 43'; Kovačić 64'; Haaland 76' (pen.); Doku 87'; Gvardiol 90+3'	Report	Barkley 81'	Stadium: City of Manchester Stadium; Attendance: 53,449; Referee: John Brooks

25 April 2024 29	Brighton & Hove Albion	0–4	Manchester City	Brighton and Hove
20:00 BST	Veltman (yellow card) 35'; Baleba (yellow card) 76'	Report	De Bruyne 17'; Foden 26', 34'; Alvarez 62'	Stadium: Falmer Stadium; Attendance: 31,596; Referee: Jarred Gillett
Note: Originally scheduled for 17 March, the fixture was postponed due to Manchester City's participation in the FA Cup quarter-finals.

28 April 2024 35	Nottingham Forest	0–2	Manchester City	West Bridgford
16:30 BST		Report	Gvardiol 32'; Haaland 71'	Stadium: City Ground; Attendance: 29,677; Referee: Simon Hooper

4 May 2024 36	Manchester City	5–1	Wolverhampton Wanderers	Manchester
17:30 BST	Haaland 12' (pen.), 35', 45+3' (pen.), 54'; Alvarez 85'	Report	Lemina (yellow card) 41'; Semedo (yellow card) 45+2'; Hwang Hee-chan 53'; Traoré (yellow card) 64'; João Gomes (yellow card) 66'	Stadium: City of Manchester Stadium; Attendance: 53,481; Referee: Craig Pawson
Note: Fixture was initially scheduled for a 15:00 kick-off, but was moved for live Sky Sports broadcast.

11 May 2024 37	Fulham	0–4	Manchester City	Fulham
12:30 BST	Diop (yellow card) 78' (yellow-red card) 90+5'; Robinson (yellow card) 90'	Report	Gvardiol 13', 71'; Foden 59'; Alvarez 90+6' (pen.)	Stadium: Craven Cottage; Attendance: 24,418; Referee: Anthony Taylor

14 May 2024 34	Tottenham Hotspur	0–2	Manchester City	Tottenham
20:00 BST	Bentancur (yellow card) 36'; Sarr (yellow card) 57'; Romero (yellow card) 63'	Report	Haaland 51', 90+1' (pen.); Kovačić (yellow card) 70'; Foden (yellow card) 88'; Silva (yellow card) 90+10'	Stadium: Tottenham Hotspur Stadium; Attendance: 61,065; Referee: Chris Kavanagh
Note: Originally scheduled for 20 April, the fixture was postponed due to Manchester City's participation in the FA Cup semi-finals.

19 May 2024 38	Manchester City	3–1	West Ham United	Manchester
16:00 BST	Foden 2', 18'; Rodri 59'	Report	Kudus 42'; Álvarez (yellow card) 76'	Stadium: City of Manchester Stadium; Attendance: 53,544; Referee: John Brooks

=== FA Cup ===
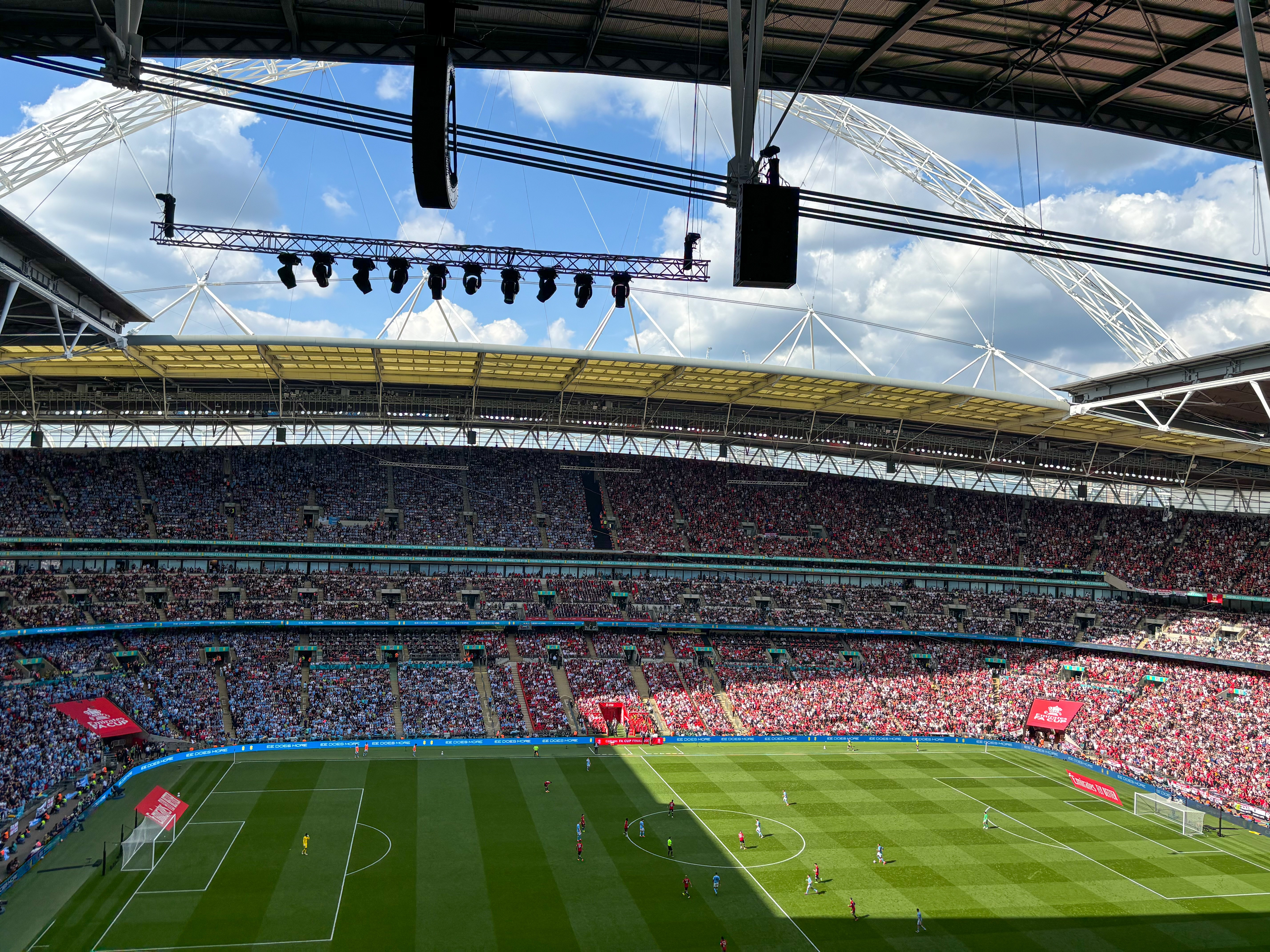
Wembley Stadium during the FA Cup final

As a Premier League team, Manchester City entered the FA Cup in the third round proper, and were drawn at home to EFL Championship side Huddersfield Town. In the fourth round, City were drawn away to fellow Premier League side Tottenham Hotspur. In the fifth round, they were again drawn away to a fellow Premier League side in Luton Town. In the quarter-finals, the Blues were drawn at home to fellow Premier League side Newcastle United. In the semi-finals at Wembley Stadium, City were paired with Chelsea, with a potential Manchester derby and rematch of last year's final at stake, which eventually proved to be the case.

7 January 2024 Third round	Manchester City	5–0	Huddersfield Town	Manchester
14:00 GMT	Foden 33', 65'; Alvarez 37'; Jackson 58' (o.g.); Doku 74'	Report	Matos (yellow card) 13'; Spencer (yellow card) 90+3'	Stadium: City of Manchester Stadium; Attendance: 51,939; Referee: Michael Salisbury

26 January 2024 Fourth round	Tottenham Hotspur	0–1	Manchester City	Tottenham
20:00 GMT	Udogie (yellow card) 59'; Vicario (yellow card) 88'; Porro (yellow card) 90+6'	Report	Kovačić (yellow card) 56'; Dias (yellow card) 70'; Gvardiol (yellow card) 84'; Aké 88'; Doku (yellow card) 90+6'	Stadium: Tottenham Hotspur Stadium; Attendance: 60,872; Referee: Paul Tierney

27 February 2024 Fifth round	Luton Town	2–6	Manchester City	Luton
20:00 GMT	Clark 45', 52'	Report	Haaland 3', 18', 40', 55', 58'; Kovačić 72'	Stadium: Kenilworth Road; Attendance: 11,163; Referee: Anthony Taylor

16 March 2024 Quarter-finals	Manchester City	2–0	Newcastle United	Manchester
17:30 GMT	Silva 13', 31'	Report	Schär (yellow card) 18'; Lascelles (yellow card) 28'; Almirón (yellow card) 90+3'	Stadium: City of Manchester Stadium; Attendance: 52,126; Referee: Simon Hooper

20 April 2024 Semi-finals	Manchester City	1–0	Chelsea	Wembley
17:15 BST	Alvarez (yellow card) 58'; Foden (yellow card) 83'; Silva 84'; De Bruyne (yellow card) 86'	Report	Caicedo (yellow card) 45'; Petrović (yellow card) 83'; Fernández (yellow card) 86'	Stadium: Wembley Stadium; Attendance: 80,902; Referee: Michael Oliver

25 May 2024 Final	Manchester City	1–2	Manchester United	Wembley
15:00 BST	Doku 87'; Alvarez (yellow card) 90+7'	Report	Garnacho 30'; Mainoo 39', (yellow card) 45'; McTominay (yellow card) 90+5'	Stadium: Wembley Stadium; Attendance: 84,814; Referee: Andrew Madley

=== EFL Cup ===
As a Premier League team involved in European competition, Manchester City entered the EFL Cup in the third round, and were drawn away to fellow Premier League side Newcastle United.

27 September 2023 Third round	Newcastle United	1–0	Manchester City	Newcastle upon Tyne
20:00 BST	Isak 53'; Bruno Guimarães (yellow card) 69'; Tonali (yellow card) 82'	Report	Akanji (yellow card) 65'; Phillips (yellow card) 66'	Stadium: St James' Park; Attendance: 51,692; Referee: Chris Kavanagh

=== FA Community Shield ===
As the previous season's Premier League and FA Cup winners, Manchester City faced league runners-up Arsenal in the traditional season curtain raiser.

6 August 2023 Final	Arsenal	1–1 (4–1 p)	Manchester City	London
16:00 BST	Partey (yellow card) 8'; Havertz (yellow card) 27'; Gabriel (yellow card) 66'; Trossard 90+11'	Report	Alvarez (yellow card) 31'; Palmer 77'	Stadium: Wembley Stadium; Attendance: 81,145; Referee: Stuart Attwell
	Penalties
	Ødegaard (penalty scored); Trossard (penalty scored); Saka (penalty scored); Vieira (penalty scored)		(penalty missed) De Bruyne; (penalty scored) Silva; (penalty missed) Rodri

=== UEFA Champions League ===
==== Group stage ====
The draw for the group stage took place in Monaco on 31 August 2023.

Pos	Team	Pld	W	D	L	GF	GA	GD	Pts	Qualification	MCI	RBL	YB	RSB
1	(England) Manchester City	6	6	0	0	18	7	+11	18	Advance to knockout phase	—	3–2	3–0	3–1
2	(Germany) RB Leipzig	6	4	0	2	13	10	+3	12	Advance to knockout phase	1–3	—	2–1	3–1
3	(Switzerland) Young Boys	6	1	1	4	7	13	−6	4	Transfer to Europa League	1–3	1–3	—	2–0
4	(Serbia) Red Star Belgrade	6	0	1	5	7	15	−8	1		2–3	1–2	2–2	—

Source: UEFA
Rules for classification: Group stage tiebreakers

19 September 2023 1	Manchester City (England)	3–1	(Serbia) Red Star Belgrade	Manchester
20:00 BST	Alvarez 47', 60'; Rodri (yellow card) 24', (goal) 73'; Dias (yellow card) 56'	Report	Rodić (yellow card) 32'; Bukari 45'; Stamenić (yellow card) 82'	Stadium: City of Manchester Stadium; Attendance: 50,204; Referee: João Pinheiro (Portugal)

4 October 2023 2	RB Leipzig (Germany)	1–3	(England) Manchester City	Leipzig, Germany
21:00 CEST	Openda 48'; Schlager (yellow card) 71'; Raum (yellow card) 78'	Report	Foden 25'; Akanji (yellow card) 65'; Alvarez 84'; Doku 90+2'	Stadium: Red Bull Arena; Attendance: 45,228; Referee: Artur Soares Dias (Portugal)

25 October 2023 3	Young Boys (Switzerland)	1–3	(England) Manchester City	Bern, Switzerland
21:00 CEST	Monteiro (yellow card) 3'; Elia 52'; Camara (yellow card) 64'	Report	Akanji 48'; Haaland 67' (pen.), 86'	Stadium: Wankdorf; Attendance: 31,500; Referee: Morten Krogh (Denmark)

7 November 2023 4	Manchester City (England)	3–0	(Switzerland) Young Boys	Manchester
20:00 GMT	Haaland 25' (pen.), 51'; Foden 45+1'	Report	Benito (yellow card) 15'; Lauper (yellow card) 19' (yellow-red card) 53'; Amenda (yellow card) 77'	Stadium: City of Manchester Stadium; Attendance: 51,049; Referee: Erik Lambrechts (Belgium)

28 November 2023 5	Manchester City (England)	3–2	(Germany) RB Leipzig	Manchester
20:00 GMT	Dias (yellow card) 21'; Haaland 54'; Foden 70'; Alvarez 87'	Report	Openda 13', 33'	Stadium: City of Manchester Stadium; Attendance: 51,402; Referee: Glenn Nyberg (Sweden)

13 December 2023 6	Red Star Belgrade (Serbia)	2–3	(England) Manchester City	Belgrade, Serbia
18:45 CET	Spajić (yellow card) 45+1'; Mijailović (yellow card) 65'; Hwang In-beom 76'; Djiga (yellow card) 84'; Katai 90+1'	Report	Hamilton 19'; Phillips (yellow card) 52', (goal) 85' (pen.); Bobb 62'	Stadium: Rajko Mitić Stadium; Attendance: 49,443; Referee: Aliyar Aghayev (Azerbaijan)

==== Knockout phase ====
===== Round of 16 =====
The draw for the round of 16 took place in Nyon, Switzerland, on 18 December 2023.

13 February 2024 First leg	Copenhagen (Denmark)	1–3	(England) Manchester City	Copenhagen, Denmark
21:00 CET	Mattsson 34'; Falk (yellow card) 71'; Diks (yellow card) 74'	Report	De Bruyne 10'; Silva 45+1'; Foden 90+2'	Stadium: Parken Stadium; Attendance: 35,853; Referee: José María Sánchez Martínez (Spain)

6 March 2024 Second leg	Manchester City (England)	3–1 (6–2 agg.)	(Denmark) Copenhagen	Manchester
20:00 GMT	Akanji 5'; Alvarez 9'; Haaland 45+3'	Report	Elyounoussi 29'; Cornelius (yellow card) 84'; Mattsson (yellow card) 90'	Stadium: City of Manchester Stadium; Attendance: 51,531; Referee: Espen Eskås (Norway)

===== Quarter-finals =====
The draw for the quarter-finals and semi-finals took place in Nyon, Switzerland, on 15 March 2024.

9 April 2024 First leg	Real Madrid (Spain)	3–3	(England) Manchester City	Madrid, Spain
21:00 CEST	Tchouaméni (yellow card) 1'; Dias 12' (o.g.); Rodrygo 14'; Valverde 79'; Carvajal (yellow card) 81'	Report	Silva 2', (yellow card) 88'; Akanji (yellow card) 37'; Foden 66'; Gvardiol 71'	Stadium: Santiago Bernabéu; Attendance: 76,680; Referee: François Letexier (France)

17 April 2024 Second leg	Manchester City (England)	1–1 (a.e.t.) (4–4 agg.) (3–4 p)	(Spain) Real Madrid	Manchester
20:00 BST	Grealish (yellow card) 59'; Gvardiol (yellow card) 61'; De Bruyne 76'; Rodri (yellow card) 90'	Report	Rodrygo 12'; Carvajal (yellow card) 38'; Mendy (yellow card) 90+4'	Stadium: City of Manchester Stadium; Attendance: 52,306; Referee: Daniele Orsato (Italy)
	Penalties
	Alvarez (penalty scored); Silva (penalty missed); Kovačić (penalty missed); Foden (penalty scored); Ederson (penalty scored)		(penalty missed) Modrić; (penalty scored) Bellingham; (penalty scored) Vázquez; (penalty scored) Nacho; (penalty scored) Rüdiger

=== UEFA Super Cup ===
As the previous season's UEFA Champions League winners, Manchester City faced the reigning UEFA Europa League winners Sevilla.

16 August 2023 Final	Manchester City (England)	1–1 (5–4 p)	(Spain) Sevilla	Piraeus, Greece
22:00 EEST	Palmer 63'	Report	En-Nesyri 25'; Badé (yellow card) 33'; Lamela (yellow card) 62'; Juanlu (yellow card) 90'	Stadium: Karaiskakis Stadium; Attendance: 29,207; Referee: François Letexier (France)
	Penalties
	Haaland (penalty scored); Alvarez (penalty scored); Kovačić (penalty scored); Grealish (penalty scored); Walker (penalty scored)		(penalty scored) Ocampos; (penalty scored) Mir; (penalty scored) Rakitić; (penalty scored) Montiel; (penalty missed) Gudelj

=== FIFA Club World Cup ===
Manchester City entered the tournament in the semi-finals as the European representative, having been drawn against the winner of the quarter-final match between Club León and Urawa Red Diamonds.

19 December 2023 Semi-finals	Urawa Red Diamonds (Japan)	0–3	(England) Manchester City	Jeddah, Saudi Arabia
21:00 SAST		Report	Akanji (yellow card) 24'; Høibråten 45+1' (o.g.); Kovačić 52'; Silva 59'; Nunes (yellow card) 83'	Stadium: King Abdullah Sports City; Attendance: 40,127; Referee: Mohammed Al Hoish (Saudi Arabia)

22 December 2023 Final	Manchester City (England)	4–0	(Brazil) Fluminense	Jeddah, Saudi Arabia
21:00 SAST	Alvarez 1', 88'; Nino 27' (o.g.); Foden 72'	Report	Marcelo (yellow card) 57'; Alexsander (yellow card) 68'; John Kennedy (yellow card) 84'	Stadium: King Abdullah Sports City; Attendance: 52,601; Referee: Szymon Marciniak (Poland)

== Statistics ==
=== Overall ===
Appearances numbers are for appearances in competitive games only, including substitute appearances.
Red card numbers denote: numbers in parentheses represent red cards overturned for wrongful dismissal.
Source for all stats:

No.	Player	Pos.	Premier League				FA Cup				EFL Cup				UEFA Champions League				Other competitions (Note: Includes FA Community Shield, UEFA Super Cup and FIFA Club World Cup)				Total			
No.	Player	Pos.	👕	Goal	Yellow card	Red card	👕	Goal	Yellow card	Red card	👕	Goal	Yellow card	Red card	👕	Goal	Yellow card	Red card	👕	Goal	Yellow card	Red card	👕	Goal	Yellow card	Red card
2	(England) Kyle Walker	DF	32		2		5								6				4				46		2	
3	(Portugal) Rúben Dias	DF	29				4		1						7		2		2				44		3	
5	(England) John Stones	DF	16	1	2		3								6				3				27	1	2	
6	(Netherlands) Nathan Aké	DF	29	2			4	1			1				7				3				43	3		
8	(Croatia) Mateo Kovačić	MF	30	1	4		5	1	1		1				6				4	1			45	3	5	
9	(Norway) Erling Haaland	FW	31	27	1		3	5							9	6			2				45	38	1	
10	(England) Jack Grealish	MF	20	3	7		3				1				8		1		4				36	3	8	
11	(Belgium) Jérémy Doku	MF	29	3	3		6	2	1		1				7	1							43	6	4	
16	(Spain) Rodri	MF	34	8	8	1	4								8	1	2		4				50	9	10	1
17	(Belgium) Kevin De Bruyne	MF	18	4	2		5		1						2	2			1				25	6	3	
18	(Germany) Stefan Ortega	GK	9				6				1				3				1				17			
19	(Argentina) Julián Alvarez	FW	35	11	2		6	1	2		1				7	5			4	2	1		53	19	4	
20	(Portugal) Bernardo Silva	MF	33	6	8		5	3							8	2	1		3	1			48	12	9	
21	(Spain) Sergio Gómez	DF	6				2				1				5				1				15			
24	(Croatia) Joško Gvardiol	DF	28	4	3		4		1		1				6	1	1		3				42	5	5	
25	(Switzerland) Manuel Akanji	DF	30	2	2	1	5				1		1		7	2	2		4		1		45	4	6	1
27	(Portugal) Matheus Nunes	MF	17				3				1				8				2		1		30		1	
31	(Brazil) Ederson	GK	33		4										7				3				43		4	
33	(England) Scott Carson	GK																								
47	(England) Phil Foden	MF	36	19	2		5	2	1		1				8	5			4	1			54	27	3	
52	(Norway) Oscar Bobb	MF	14	1			5				1				4	1			2				26	2		
56	(England) Jacob Wright	MF					1								1								2			
76	(Spain) Mahamadou Susoho	MF													1								1			
82	(England) Rico Lewis	DF	16	2	1		2				1				7				1				26	2	1	
92	(England) Micah Hamilton	FW					1								2	1							3	1		
Loan	(England) Kalvin Phillips	MF	4								1		1		3	1	1		2				9	1	2	
Loan	(England) James McAtee	MF	1																				1			
Sold	(Spain) Aymeric Laporte	DF	1																				1			
Sold	(England) Cole Palmer	MF	1																2	2			3	2		
Own goals				2				1												2				5		
Totals				96	50	2		16	8	0		0	2	0		28	10	0		9	3	0		149	73	2

=== Goalscorers ===
Includes all competitive matches. The list is sorted alphabetically by surname when total goals are equal.

Rank	No.	Pos.	Player	Premier League	FA Cup	EFL Cup	FA Community Shield	UEFA Champions League	UEFA Super Cup	FIFA Club World Cup	Total
1	9	FW	(Norway) Erling Haaland	27	5	0	0	6	0	0	38
2	47	MF	(England) Phil Foden	19	2	0	0	5	0	1	27
3	19	FW	(Argentina) Julián Alvarez	11	1	0	0	5	0	2	19
4	20	MF	(Portugal) Bernardo Silva	6	3	0	0	2	0	1	12
5	16	MF	(Spain) Rodri	8	0	0	0	1	0	0	9
6	11	MF	(Belgium) Jérémy Doku	3	2	0	0	1	0	0	6
6	17	MF	(Belgium) Kevin De Bruyne	4	0	0	0	2	0	0	6
8	24	DF	(Croatia) Joško Gvardiol	4	0	0	0	1	0	0	5
9	25	DF	(Switzerland) Manuel Akanji	2	0	0	0	2	0	0	4
10	6	DF	(Netherlands) Nathan Aké	2	1	0	0	0	0	0	3
10	10	MF	(England) Jack Grealish	3	0	0	0	0	0	0	3
10	8	MF	(Croatia) Mateo Kovačić	1	1	0	0	0	0	1	3
13	52	MF	(Norway) Oscar Bobb	1	0	0	0	1	0	0	2
13	82	MF	(England) Rico Lewis	2	0	0	0	0	0	0	2
13	Sold	MF	(England) Cole Palmer	0	0	0	1	0	1	0	2
16	92	MF	(England) Micah Hamilton	0	0	0	0	1	0	0	1
16	Loan	MF	(England) Kalvin Phillips	0	0	0	0	1	0	0	1
16	5	DF	(England) John Stones	1	0	0	0	0	0	0	1
Own goals				2	1	0	0	0	0	2	5
Totals				96	16	0	1	28	1	7	149

=== Assists ===
Includes all competitive matches. The list is sorted alphabetically by surname when total assists are equal.

Rank	No.	Pos.	Player	Premier League	FA Cup	EFL Cup	FA Community Shield	UEFA Champions League	UEFA Super Cup	FIFA Club World Cup	Total
1	17	MF	(Belgium) Kevin De Bruyne	10	5	0	1	2	0	0	18
2	19	FW	(Argentina) Julián Alvarez	9	1	0	0	2	0	1	13
2	16	MF	(Spain) Rodri	9	1	0	0	2	1	0	13
4	47	MF	(England) Phil Foden	8	1	0	0	3	0	0	12
5	20	MF	(Portugal) Bernardo Silva	9	1	0	0	0	0	0	10
6	11	MF	(Belgium) Jérémy Doku	8	0	0	0	1	0	0	9
7	9	FW	(Norway) Erling Haaland	5	0	0	0	1	0	0	6
8	2	DF	(England) Kyle Walker	4	0	0	0	0	0	1	5
9	82	DF	(England) Rico Lewis	0	1	0	0	3	0	0	4
9	27	MF	(Portugal) Matheus Nunes	2	0	0	0	1	0	1	4
11	10	MF	(England) Jack Grealish	1	0	0	0	2	0	0	3
12	6	DF	(Netherlands) Nathan Aké	2	0	0	0	0	0	0	2
12	24	DF	(Croatia) Joško Gvardiol	1	0	0	0	1	0	0	2
12	5	DF	(England) John Stones	0	1	0	0	1	0	0	2
15	52	MF	(Norway) Oscar Bobb	1	0	0	0	0	0	0	1
15	3	DF	(Portugal) Rúben Dias	0	1	0	0	0	0	0	1
15	21	DF	(Spain) Sergio Gómez	1	0	0	0	0	0	0	1
15	8	MF	(Croatia) Mateo Kovačić	0	1	0	0	0	0	0	1
Totals				71	13	0	1	19	1	3	108

=== Disciplinary record ===
Includes all competitive matches. The list is sorted alphabetically by surname when total cards are equal.

Rank	No.	Pos.	Player	Premier League			FA Cup			EFL Cup			FA Community Shield			UEFA Champions League			UEFA Super Cup			FIFA Club World Cup			Total		
Rank	No.	Pos.	Player	Yellow card	(yellow card) (yellow-red card)	Red card	Yellow card	(yellow card) (yellow-red card)	Red card	Yellow card	(yellow card) (yellow-red card)	Red card	Yellow card	(yellow card) (yellow-red card)	Red card	Yellow card	(yellow card) (yellow-red card)	Red card	Yellow card	(yellow card) (yellow-red card)	Red card	Yellow card	(yellow card) (yellow-red card)	Red card	Yellow card	(yellow card) (yellow-red card)	Red card
1	16	MF	(Spain) Rodri	8	0	1	0	0	0	0	0	0	0	0	0	2	0	0	0	0	0	0	0	0	10	0	1
2	20	MF	(Portugal) Bernardo Silva	8	0	0	0	0	0	0	0	0	0	0	0	1	0	0	0	0	0	0	0	0	9	0	0
3	10	MF	(England) Jack Grealish	7	0	0	0	0	0	0	0	0	0	0	0	1	0	0	0	0	0	0	0	0	8	0	0
4	25	DF	(Switzerland) Manuel Akanji	2	1	0	0	0	0	1	0	0	0	0	0	2	0	0	0	0	0	1	0	0	6	1	0
5	19	FW	(Argentina) Julián Alvarez	2	0	0	2	0	0	0	0	0	1	0	0	0	0	0	0	0	0	0	0	0	5	0	0
5	24	DF	(Croatia) Joško Gvardiol	3	0	0	1	0	0	0	0	0	0	0	0	1	0	0	0	0	0	0	0	0	5	0	0
5	8	MF	(Croatia) Mateo Kovačić	4	0	0	1	0	0	0	0	0	0	0	0	0	0	0	0	0	0	0	0	0	5	0	0
8	11	MF	(Belgium) Jérémy Doku	3	0	0	1	0	0	0	0	0	0	0	0	0	0	0	0	0	0	0	0	0	4	0	0
8	31	GK	(Brazil) Ederson	4	0	0	0	0	0	0	0	0	0	0	0	0	0	0	0	0	0	0	0	0	4	0	0
10	17	MF	(Belgium) Kevin De Bruyne	2	0	0	1	0	0	0	0	0	0	0	0	0	0	0	0	0	0	0	0	0	3	0	0
10	3	DF	(Portugal) Ruben Dias	0	0	0	1	0	0	0	0	0	0	0	0	2	0	0	0	0	0	0	0	0	3	0	0
10	47	MF	(England) Phil Foden	2	0	0	1	0	0	0	0	0	0	0	0	0	0	0	0	0	0	0	0	0	3	0	0
13	Loan	MF	(England) Kalvin Phillips	0	0	0	0	0	0	1	0	0	0	0	0	1	0	0	0	0	0	0	0	0	2	0	0
13	5	DF	(England) John Stones	2	0	0	0	0	0	0	0	0	0	0	0	0	0	0	0	0	0	0	0	0	2	0	0
13	2	DF	(England) Kyle Walker	2	0	0	0	0	0	0	0	0	0	0	0	0	0	0	0	0	0	0	0	0	2	0	0
16	9	FW	(Norway) Erling Haaland	1	0	0	0	0	0	0	0	0	0	0	0	0	0	0	0	0	0	0	0	0	1	0	0
16	82	DF	(England) Rico Lewis	1	0	0	0	0	0	0	0	0	0	0	0	0	0	0	0	0	0	0	0	0	1	0	0
16	27	MF	(Portugal) Matheus Nunes	0	0	0	0	0	0	0	0	0	0	0	0	0	0	0	0	0	0	1	0	0	1	0	0
Total				50	1	1	8	0	0	2	0	0	1	0	0	10	0	0	0	0	0	2	0	0	73	1	1

=== Hat-tricks ===
Player	Against	Result	Date	Competition	Ref.
(Norway) Erling Haaland	Fulham (H)	5–1	2 September 2023	Premier League	
(England) Phil Foden	Brentford (A)	3–1	5 February 2024	Premier League	
(Norway) Erling Haaland^{5}	Luton Town (A)	6–2	27 February 2024	FA Cup	
(England) Phil Foden	Aston Villa (H)	4–1	3 April 2024	Premier League	
(Norway) Erling Haaland^{4}	Wolverhampton Wanderers (H)	5–1	4 May 2024	Premier League	

4 – denotes player scored four goals
5 – denotes player scored five goals

=== Clean sheets ===
The list is sorted by shirt number when total clean sheets are equal. Numbers in parentheses represent matches where both goalkeepers participated and both kept a clean sheet; the number in parentheses is awarded to the goalkeeper who was substituted on, whilst a full clean sheet is awarded to the goalkeeper who was on the field at the start of play.

				Clean sheets							
No.	Player	Apps	Goals against	Premier League	FA Cup	EFL Cup	FA Community Shield	UEFA Champions League	UEFA Super Cup	FIFA Club World Cup	Total
31	(Brazil) Ederson	43	34	12	0	0	0	1	0	2	15
18	(Germany) Stefan Ortega	16 (4)	20	1 (2)	4	0	0	0	0	0	5 (2)
33	(England) Scott Carson	0	0	0	0	0	0	0	0	0	0
Totals			54	13 (2)	4	0	0	1	0	2	20 (2)

== Awards ==
=== Etihad Player of the Year ===
Player	Ref.
(England) Phil Foden	

=== PFA Players' Player of the Year ===
Player	Ref.
(England) Phil Foden	

=== Premier League Player of the Season ===
Player	Ref.
(England) Phil Foden	

=== FWA Footballer of the Year ===
Player	Ref.
(England) Phil Foden	

=== Premier League Golden Boot ===
Player	Goals	Ref.
(Norway) Erling Haaland	27	

=== Premier League Manager of the Season ===
Manager	Ref.
(Spain) Pep Guardiola	

=== FIFA Club World Cup awards ===
Award	Player	Ref.
Golden Ball	(Spain) Rodri	
Silver Ball	(England) Kyle Walker	

=== UEFA Champions League Team of the Season ===
Selected by UEFA's technical study group.

Position	Player	Ref.
FW	(England) Phil Foden	

=== PFA Team of the Year ===
Position	Player	Ref.
DF	(England) Kyle Walker	
MF	(Spain) Rodri	
FW	(England) Phil Foden	
FW	(Norway) Erling Haaland	

=== Premier League Goal of the Month ===
Month	Player	Score	Opponents	Date	Ref.
January	(Norway) Oscar Bobb	3–2	Newcastle United	13 January 2024	

=== Etihad Player of the Month ===
Awarded by an online vote of supporters on the official Manchester City F.C. website.

Month	Player	Ref.
August	(Spain) Rodri	
September	(Argentina) Julián Alvarez	
October	(Norway) Erling Haaland	
November	(Belgium) Jérémy Doku	
December	(England) Phil Foden	
January	(Belgium) Kevin De Bruyne	
February	(England) Phil Foden	
March	(Spain) Rodri	
April	(England) Phil Foden	
