= Laguna Larga =

- City and municipality
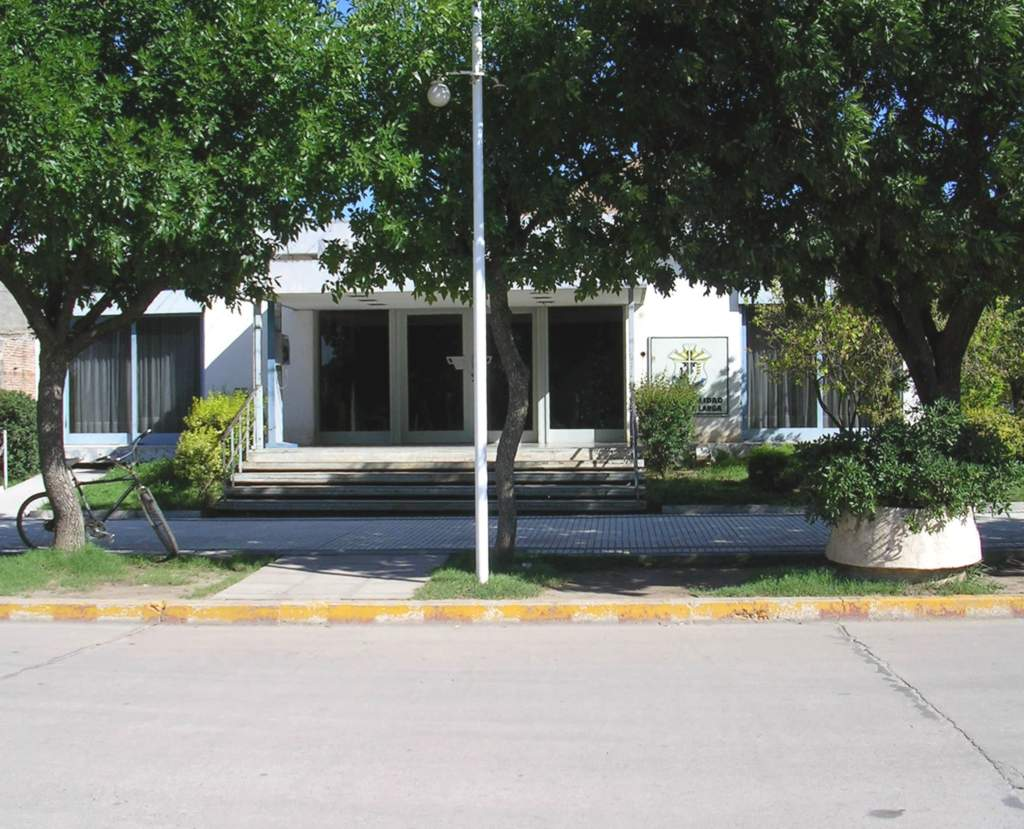
- Palacio Municipal.

- Flag
- Etymology: Spanish: laguna larga (long lagoon)
- Interactive map of Laguna Larga
- Coordinates: 31°46′36″S 63°48′09″W
- Country: Argentina
- Province: Córdoba Province, Argentina
- Department: Río Segundo
- Founded: 30 November 1869

Government
  - Intendant: Matías Leonardo Torres Cena (PJ)
- Elevation: 309 m (1,014 ft)

Population (2010)
  - Total: 7,837
- Demonym: lagunense
- Time zone: UTC−3 (ART)
- Postal code: X5974
- Area code: 03572
- Website: lagunalarga.gov.ar

Laguna Larga is a town and municipality in the Impira District of the Río Segundo Department, Córdoba Province, Argentina, 55 kilometres (34 mi) from the provincial capital, Córdoba.

It is beside National Route 9, 4 kilometres (2.5 mi) from the Rosario-Córdoba Highway and 12 kilometres (7.5 mi) from the RP 10, which connects with National Route 158 of Mercosur.

Its urban plant is 150 hectares (370 acres) in size, in a checkerboard pattern with a service street that divides it into two smaller blocks, with 225 blocks. National Route 9, parallel to the Nuevo Central Argentino (NCA) railroad tracks, divides the town into north and south sectors. The north has more economic activity, while the south is basically residential. Sportspeople such as Paulo Dybala and Thiago Prieto were born in Laguna Larga.

== Geography ==
Laguna Larga is in the western part of the Río Segundo Department, in Córdoba Province, Argentina. It is bordered on the north by Costa Sacate, on the east by Impira, on the west by Lagunilla and Pilar, and on the south by Manfredi.

=== Population ===
It has 7437 inhabitants (INDEC, 2010), which represents an increase of 4.2% compared to the 7237 inhabitants (Indec, 2001) of the previous census.

demographic vertical bar chart of Laguna Larga between 1991 and 2010
Source: National censuses by INDEC

=== Landscape features ===
Laguna Larga is located in the region of the "Domain of the Eastern Plains" with very low slope (2 to 3 per thousand) from east to east-northeast, with altitudes of 360 metres (1,180 ft) above sea level (west) to 160 metres (520 ft) above sea level (east). The land's limitations for human use include water deficiency and salinity, alkalinity and waterlogging in the eastern depression.

=== Seismicity ===
The seismicity of the Córdoba region is frequent and of low intensity, with a seismic silence of medium to severe earthquakes every 30 years in random areas.

=== Flora ===
Laguna Larga is located in the "spinal domain", with growth on the mountains of Prosopis alba (white carob tree) and Prosopis nigra (black carob tree), along with Ziziphus mistol and Prosopis kuntzei (itín), Geoffroea decorticans (chañar), Celtis ehrenbergiana (desert hackberry) and Vachellia aroma (tusca).

=== Agriculture and livestock ===
- Agricultural areas, 80%: soybeans, wheat, maize, peanuts and other grains to a lesser extent.
- Flood areas, cushion of natural vegetation composed of reeds, Spartina spartinae (gulf cordgrass) and other plants; used as a grazing area for livestock.

=== Subsoil ===
==== Pampas Formation ====
- From 0 metres (0 ft) to 70 metres (230 ft), grayish brown slimes, weathered and diagenetic, with deposits of Fe and Mn.
- From 70 metres (230 ft) to 90 metres (300 ft), reddish and yellow brown slimes, free of calcium carbonate but with calcareous concretions.

==== Puelche Formation ====
- From 90 metres (300 ft) to 125 metres (410 ft), yellowish and grayish brown sands.
- From 125 metres (410 ft) to 170 metres (560 ft), slimes and grayish green clays, with intercalation of sands.

==== Paraná Formation ====
- From 170 metres (560 ft) to 220 metres (720 ft), dark blue-gray and grayish-green clays, with layers of sands and fine sands.
- From 220 metres (720 ft) down, dark greenish clays and dark brown.

=== Climate ===
The region is located within the semi-dry continental temperate climate with sub-humid tendency and 50 millimetres (2.0 in) to 100 millimetres (3.9 in) of annual water deficit. It has warm summers and cold, but not harsh, winters. There is a predominance of winds from the northeast. In winter the winds from the south are more frequent. The average wind speed is 12 kilometres per hour (7.5 mph).

- Average annual temperature of 18 °C (64 °F), annual average maximum 26 °C (79 °F), annual average minimum 10 °C (50 °F).
- Rainfall: in the isohyet from 700 to 800 mm (occurs in summer and early autumn)
- Frost-free period: October to the first half of May.

=== Hydrography ===
Laguna Larga is in the "Endorheic Basin of Mar Chiquita", on the northern slope of the watersheds of the Mar Chiquita basins and the Carcarañá River system. The small slope and scarce percolation of the water favor flooding and the presence of lagoons and ravines.

== History ==
Laguna Larga was founded in 1869, but there are earlier references to it in history. A famous event was the battle between unitarians and federals on February 25, 1830, when forces of General José María Paz and Juan Facundo Quiroga clashed in the vicinity of the Cachicoya Lagoon, on the territory of the current town of Laguna Larga, better known since the twentieth century as the Battle of Oncativo.

At the end of the 19th century the parish, school and cemetery were organized.

- 1910: Laguna Larga has 1,650 inhabitants. The migratory movements of Europeans reach Laguna Larga in the first decades of the twentieth century.
- 1920: Laguna Larga becomes a municipality with municipal elections. Luis Corsi is the first municipal mayor.

1958: Secondary school. 1960: The town reaches a population of 3,627. 1993: The town is connected to natural gas service.

== Infrastructure and services ==
=== Drinking water ===
Drinking water service is provided by the Cooperativa Eléctrica de Laguna Larga Ltda. (Laguna Larga Electric Cooperative Ltd.). The source is the water table. There are a storage tank and two pumps.

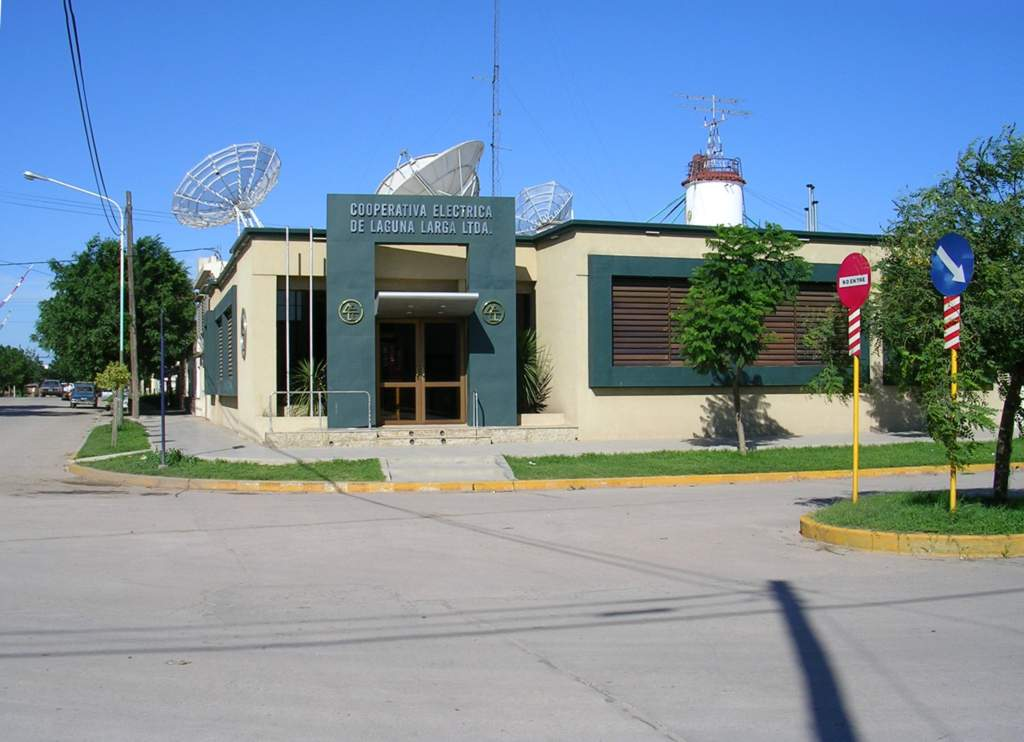
Cooperativa Eléctrica de Laguna Larga Ltda.

=== Electricity ===
The urban and rural electricity service is provided by the Cooperativa Eléctrica de Laguna Larga Ltda. through the Provincial Interconnected Service (SIP) of EPEC (Empresa Provincial de Energía de Córdoba).

=== Natural gas ===
The natural gas service by networks is provided by the Cooperativa Eléctrica de Laguna Larga Ltda. It acts as a sub-distributor. The gas comes from the gas pipeline network dependent on the distribution and transport companies.

=== Lighting, sweeping and cleaning ===
These services are provided directly by the municipality.

=== Internet ===
The Cooperativa Eléctrica de Laguna Larga Ltda., two private companies from Laguna Larga and another from Pilar provide wireless Internet service. Telecom Argentina provides broadband Internet service, via ADSL.

=== Sewers ===
The sewer project for Laguna Larga has been presented before the Provincial Directorate of Water and Sanitation (DIPAS). In the first half of 2010, the execution of the first stage of this project began, funded by ENHOSA.

=== Broadcasting ===
Laguna Larga has five radio stations and one television channel, including FM Laguna Larga 104, FM Clara 105.3, FM Mediterránea 95.3 MHz. Radio Cyclos 89.7 and Canal Centro.

=== Transportation ===
- Regular bus service, provided by three private companies (Malvinas Argentinas, Coata-Córdoba and Buses LEP), carries passengers between the city of Córdoba and Laguna Larga.
- The closest airport, Ingeniero Aeronáutico Ambrosio L.V. Taravella International Airport, is 50 kilometres (31 mi) away.
- Rail transport to the city of Córdoba and Villa María through the Regional Service operated by Operadora Ferroviaria Sociedad del Estado (SOFSE).

== Tourism ==
Laguna Larga has various celebrations and activities.

=== Provincial Rally ===
The annual "Laguna Larga Rally" road race is held in August or September. The competition takes place on the fast and flat roads of the rural area of Laguna Larga.

=== AgroCórdoba – ExpoCórdoba ===
The town formerly invited the whole country to visit for the "Muestra Agropecuaria AgroCórdoba" (AgroCórdoba Agricultural Exhibition). The last edition was in 2010.

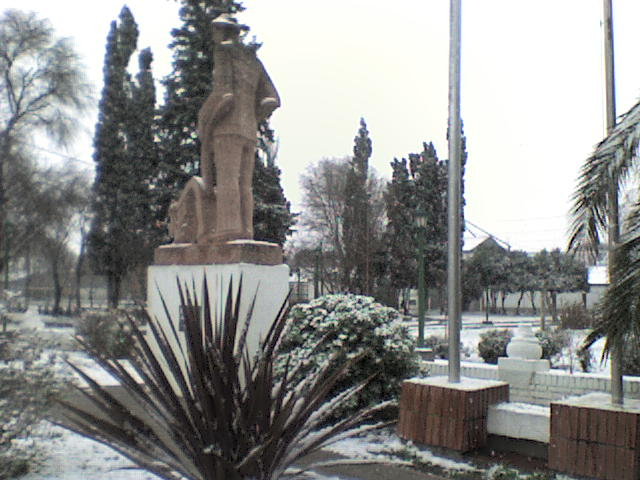
Monument to the farmer, the work of Miguel Pablo Borgarello, with an unusual snowfall on 9 July 2007.

=== Patronal festival ===
The patronal festival of Our Lady of the Rosary is held on the first Sunday of October.

=== Anniversary of the Foundation ===
On November 30 the Foundation of Laguna Larga is celebrated. During the month of November, events are held as part of a program of activities to celebrate the anniversary.

=== Fiesta Zonal del Trigo ===
In January the traditional "Wheat Festival in Laguna Larga" is revived, organized by the Club Sportivo Laguna Larga, electing the Zonal Queen who represents the region in the "Fiesta Nacional del Trigo" (National Wheat Festival) in the city of Leones.

=== Carnivals ===
In 1967, on the initiative of Mr. Néstor Paulucci, the first Carnival commission was formed, which organized the first carnival in early 1968. In 1984, with the presidency of Mr. Roberto Boldú, a record for attendance was broken with 7000 people. The proceeds of one of the nights were subsequently given to the governor of the province to be used for charitable purposes.

Until 1980 the carnival was organized exclusively by the club, but in 1985 the journalist Denis Negro ventured into the commercial management of the carnival. With the passage of time, the great carnivals of Laguna Larga took on great significance; stations such as LV2 broadcast them live and great artistic figures passed through the streets of Laguna Larga on carnival dates. All this led to the Superior Government of the Province of Córdoba together with the Council of Education and Culture, on February 22, 1985, by decree No. 701 declaring the carnival of provincial interest. In 2008, the Provincial Carnivals of Laguna Larga reached their 40th edition.

=== Other events ===
- In November the "Encuentro Provincial de Motoqueros" (Provincial Meeting of Motorcyclists) is held at the Cachicoya Lagoon.
- In January the "Festival Nocturno de Doma y Folclore" (Night Festival of Dressage and Folklore) is held on the grounds of the Cachicoya Lagoon.
- Throughout the summer rock and folklore festivals are held.

== Sportspeople ==
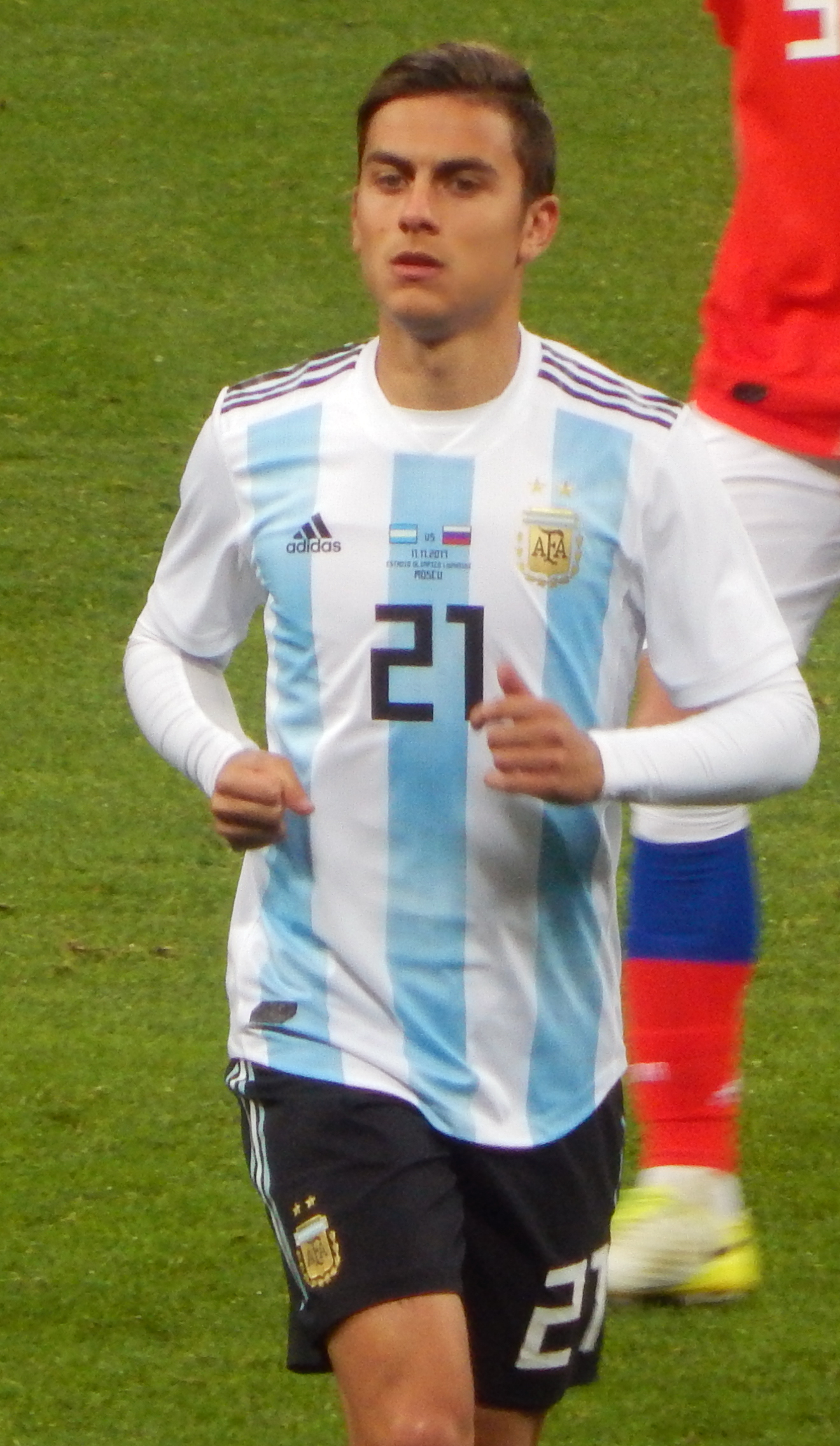
Paulo Dybala in 2017.

- Juan Pablo Avendaño, professional association football centre-back for Unión de Santa Fe (born 10 May 1982).
- Paulo Dybala, professional association football forward for AS Roma (born 15 November 1993).
- Matías Porcari, professional association football midfielder for 9 de Julio de Río Tercero (born 12 April 1986).
- Thiago Prieto Acosta, professional futsal player for San Lorenzo de Almagro (born 5 November 2003).

== Museo Cachicoya (former Museo Polifacético Regional Vottero) ==
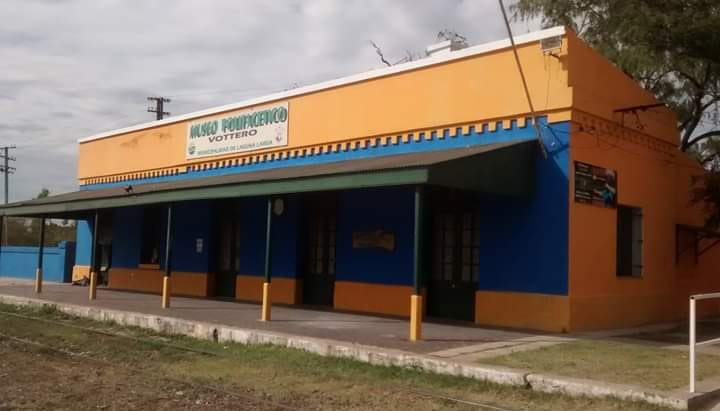
Renovated museum building in 2019.

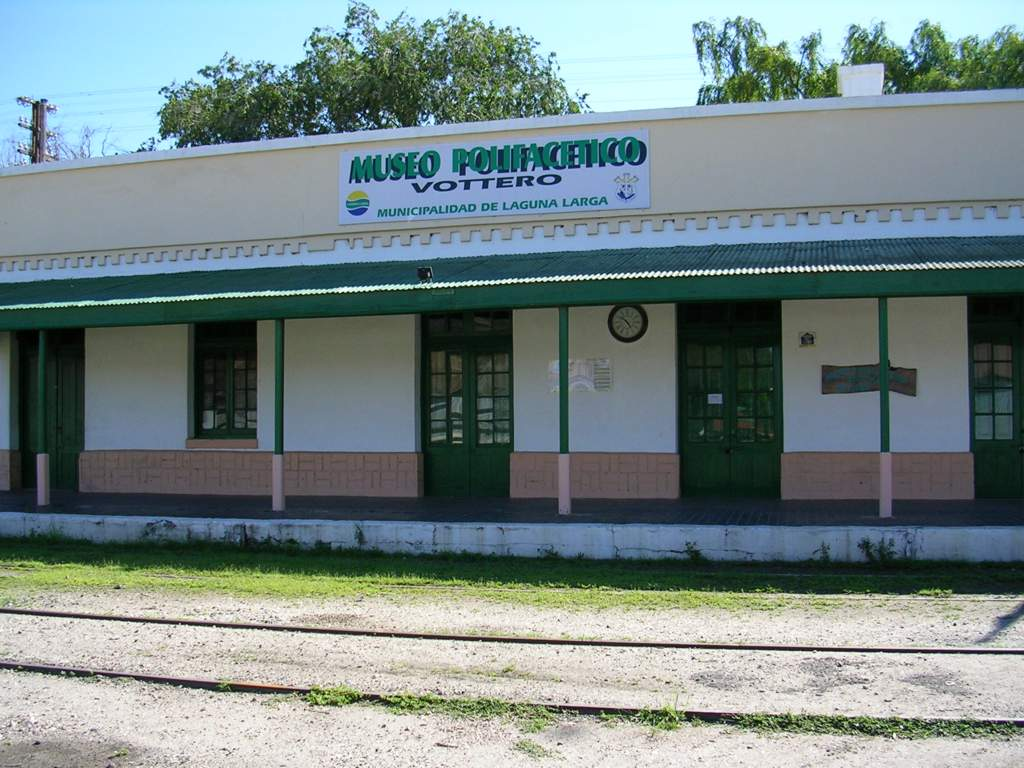
Museo Polifacético Vottero.

In 1986, 5-year-old Emanuel Vottero found the skull of a bird on the banks of the Los Molinos Dam. From that moment on, he began to collect simple objects: stones, bones and some ancient objects. His first historical piece was a camera from 1908 given to him by one of his grandparents.

In 2014, the museum, due to a very serious building problem caused by the rupture of a water pipe in the courtyard, cracked and its structure was severely damaged. The museum closed for repairs but suffered vandalism and theft. At the beginning of 2019, it was decided to set up a commission, to work collaboratively with the aim of reopening the museum and, at the same time, carrying out cultural activities at different times of the year. On 30 November 2019, the reopening of the renovated Cachicoya Museum took place, an event planned as the central piece of the celebration of Laguna Larga's sesquicentennial. In addition to the inauguration of the museum, there was a display of old cars and motorcycles, a literary gathering, artisan stalls and performances by two rock bands: Outsiders and Jalfawer. The museum continues to organize cultural events and workshops, with the doors of the museum open with free admission.

== Trade and industry ==
- Agro metal-mechanical industries: they manufacture machinery and equipment for the field. Hoppers, baggers, extractors, rolls, rakes, drag levelers, fuel tanks, couplings, seeders, pneumatic extractors, cereal loaders, bag silo extractors, roll grinders, side rakes, mixers, weeders, chimangos, inoculators, etc.
- Factories of machinery and construction equipment: they manufacture mixers, concrete, forklifts, scaffolding, etc.
- Factories of metallic structures: they build industrial buildings, sheds, warehouses, cells for grains, constructions in general, etc.
- Opening factories for construction: in general each one specializes in a material: wood, sheet metal and aluminum.
- Flour mill: produces flour for the wholesale sector since 2004.
- Cereal stockpiles: currently only one is still in operation.
- Footwear and supplies factory.
- Agrochemical Factory: dedicated to the formulation, manufacture and marketing of agroproducts: fertilizers, adjuvants, inoculants, fungicides, herbicides and insecticides.

== Sports ==
- Club Sportivo Laguna Larga: Association football, handball, volleyball, bocce, swimming, karate, rhythmic gymnastics, skating, field hockey, and tennis.
- Club Atlético y Biblioteca Newell's Old Boys: Association football, basketball, bocce, tennis, swimming, and skating.
- Centro Artístico Musical (Musical Artistic Center): Bocce, skating, and the Conservatorio de Música Hector Panizza.
- Club Caza, Pesca y Náutica "Flecha de Plata": Hunting, skeet shooting, others. (No regular activity as of 2020.)
- Playón Polideportivo Municipal: Basketball, beach volleyball, track for athletics, implements for physical exercise.
