= 1986–87 Primera B Nacional =

1st season of the second-tier football league in Argentina

Primera B Nacional
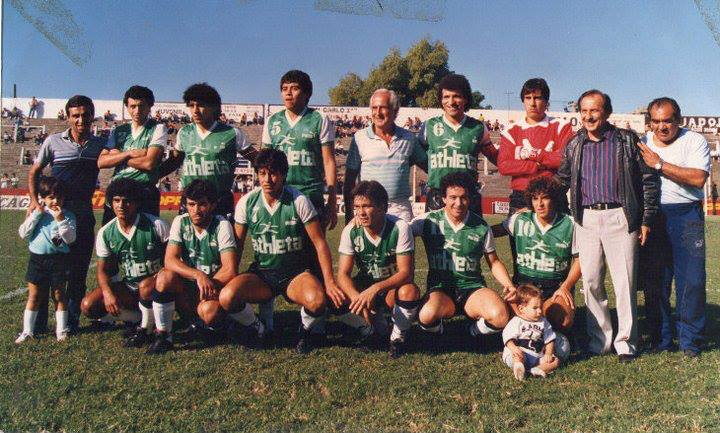
- Deportivo Armenio, champion
- Season: 1986–87
- Dates: 19 July 1986 – 2 May 1987
- Champions: Dep. Armenio (1st title)
- Promoted: Dep. Armenio; Banfield
- Relegated: Central Norte; Atlético Concepción (T); Unión (Villa Krause)
- Top goalscorer: (Argentina) José Iglesias (36)
- Highest scoring: Lanús 5–4 Banfield (18 Oct)

The 1986–87 Argentine Primera B Nacional was the 1st season of the newly created professional second division of Argentine football. This was the result of new changes in the entire Argentine football league system, the Metropolitano and Nacional of Primera División disappeared and the previous second division, the Primera B Metropolitana became the third division.

The division was formed by 7 teams from Primera B Metro (the best placed teams from a tournament played previously), 13 teams from regional leagues outside Buenos Aires and 2 teams relegated from Primera División in the 1985–86 season. A total of 22 teams competed, with the champion and runner-up being promoted to Primera División.

Deportivo Armenio won the championship, promoting to Primera along with Banfield (winner of "Torneo Octogonal"). On the other hand, Central Norte (Salta), Atlético Concepción (Banda del Río Salí, Tucumán), and Unión of Villa Krause (San Juan) were relegated to Primera B Metropolitana.

== Club information ==
Club	City	Stadium
Atlético Concepción	Banda del Río Salí	Ing. José María Paz
Banfield	Banfield	Florencio Solá
Belgrano	Córdoba	El Gigante de Alberdi
Central Córdoba	Santiago del Estero	Alfredo Terrara
Central Norte	Salta	Dr. Luis Güemes
Chacarita Juniors	Villa Maipú	Chacarita Juniors
Chaco For Ever	Resistencia	Juan Alberto García
Cipolletti	Cipolletti	La Visera de Cemento
Colón	Santa Fe	Brigadier General Estanislao López
Defensa y Justicia	Florencio Varela	Norberto "Tito" Tomaghello
Deportivo Armenio	Ingeniero Maschwitz	República de Armenia
Deportivo Maipú	Maipú	Higinio Sperdutti
Deportivo Mandiyú	Corrientes	José A. Romero Feris^{1}
Douglas Haig	Pergamino	Miguel Morales
Ferro Carril Oeste	General Pico	Coloso de Barrio Talleres
Gimnasia y Esgrima	Jujuy	23 de Agosto
Guaraní Antonio Franco	Posadas	Clemente Fernandez de Oliveira
Huracán	Buenos Aires	Tomás Adolfo Ducó
Lanús	Lanús	Ciudad de Lanús
Los Andes	Lomas de Zamora	Eduardo Gallardón
Tigre	Victoria	José Dellagiovanna
Unión	Villa Krause	12 de Octubre

1: Property of Huracán Corrientes.

== Standings ==
Deportivo Armenio was declared champion and was automatically promoted to Primera División, and the teams placed 2nd to 9th qualified for the Second Promotion Playoff.

Pos	Team	Pld	W	D	L	GF	GA	GD	Pts	Promotion or qualification
1	Deportivo Armenio	42	22	18	2	69	26	+43	62	Champion, promoted to Primera División
2	Banfield	42	20	14	8	87	49	+38	54	Qualified for the Second Promotion Playoff
3	Belgrano	42	22	10	10	75	44	+31	54	Qualified for the Second Promotion Playoff
4	Huracán	42	22	10	10	78	51	+27	54	Qualified for the Second Promotion Playoff
5	Colón	42	19	16	7	56	35	+21	54	Qualified for the Second Promotion Playoff
6	Deportivo Maipú	42	18	13	11	64	50	+14	49	Qualified for the Second Promotion Playoff
7	Deportivo Mandiyú	42	19	10	13	63	41	+22	48	Qualified for the Second Promotion Playoff
8	Chaco For Ever	42	15	18	9	55	42	+13	48	Qualified for the Second Promotion Playoff
9	Lanús	42	18	11	13	67	63	+4	47	Qualified for the Second Promotion Playoff
10	Defensa y Justicia	42	15	13	14	47	47	0	43	
11	Douglas Haig	42	13	15	14	60	53	+7	41	
12	Los Andes	42	13	14	15	54	60	−6	40	
13	Tigre	42	9	20	13	52	57	−5	38	
14	Central Córdoba (SdE)	42	13	11	18	53	62	−9	37	
15	Ferro Carril Oeste (GP)	42	13	10	19	53	62	−9	36	
16	Guaraní Antonio Franco	42	9	17	16	40	48	−8	35	
17	Cipolletti	42	10	15	17	38	49	−11	35	
18	Central Norte	42	10	14	18	45	55	−10	34	
19	Chacarita Juniors	42	10	14	18	38	57	−19	34	
20	Gimnasia y Esgrima (J)	42	9	16	17	52	82	−30	34	
21	Atlético Concepción	42	8	16	18	42	63	−21	32	
22	Unión (VK)	42	4	7	31	35	127	−92	15	

== Second Promotion Playoff ==
The Second Promotion Playoff or Torneo Reducido was played by the teams placed 2nd to 9th in the overall standings: Banfield (2nd), Belgrano (3rd), Huracán (4th), Colón (5th), Deportivo Maipú (6th), Deportivo Mandiyú (7th), Chaco For Ever (8th) and Lanús (9th). The winner was promoted to Primera División.

=== Bracket ===
Quarterfinals
2	Banfield	0	3	3
9	Lanús	0	2	2
5	Colón	3	0	3
6	Deportivo Maipú	0	1	1
3	Belgrano^{1}	2	2	4
8	Chaco For Ever	1	3	4
4	Huracán	1	1	2
7	Deportivo Mandiyú	0	0	0

Semifinals
2	Banfield^{1}	0	1	1
5	Colón	0	1	1
3	Belgrano	0	2	2
4	Huracán	0	1	1

Final
2	Banfield	0	2	2
3	Belgrano	1	0	0

1: Qualified because of sport advantage.

=== Final ===
Torneo Reducido Final
(2nd. Promotion playoff)
6 June 1987
First leg

Belgrano (C)	1–0	Banfield
Martellotto 72'

El Gigante de Alberdi, Córdoba
Referee: Jorge Vigliano

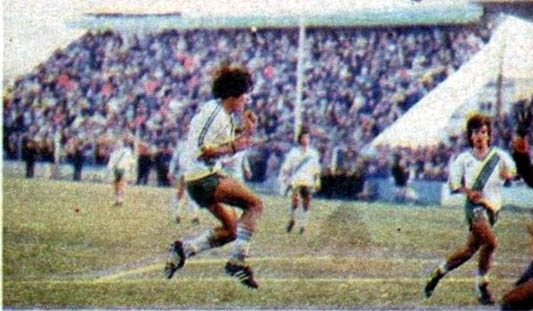
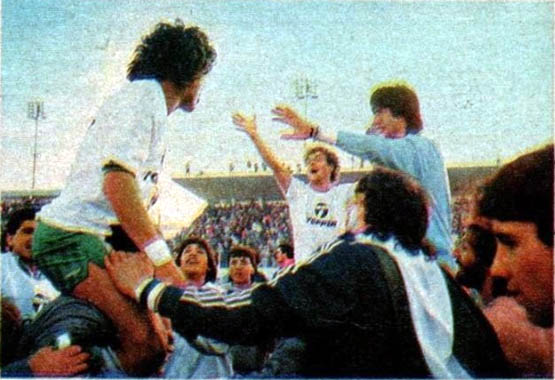
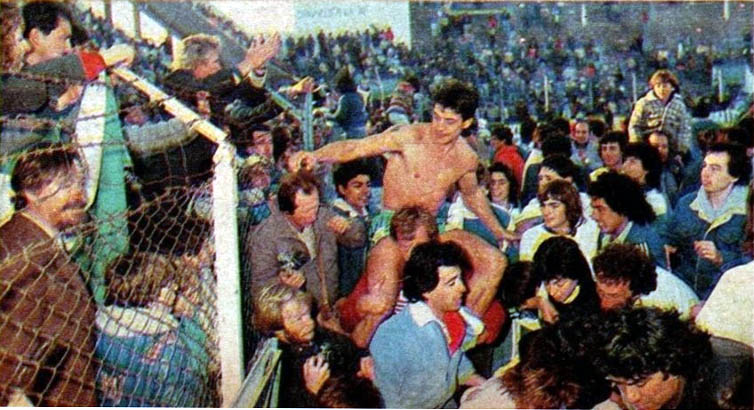
Some moments of the match including celebrations for the promotion earned
13 June 1987
Second leg

Banfield	2–0	Belgrano (C)
Benítez 76'; Aquino 89'	Report 1 Report 2

Estadio Florencio Sola, Banfield
Referee: Juan Carlos Demaro

Team details

Banfield
Belgrano (C)

GK	Eduardo Quinto Pagés
DF	Rubén Solari
DF	Héctor Clide Díaz
DF	Raúl Cardozo	(substituted off) a'
DF	Elbio Vázquez
MF	Luis Oriolo	(substituted off) b'
MF	Néstor Sassone	(substituted off) c'
MF	Horacio García
FW	Robinson Hernández
FW	Félix Orte
FW	Toribio Aquino
Substitutions:
MF	Marcelo Benítez	(substituted on) b'
MF	José L. Zuttión	(substituted on) b'
Manager:
(Argentina) Héctor D'Angelo

GK	Juan M. Ramos
DF	Luis Escobedo
DF	José Céliz
DF	Héctor Zucchini
DF	Alejandro Chiera
MF	Mario Ballarino
MF	José Luis Villarreal	Red card
MF	Germán Martellotto
FW	Abel Blasón	(substituted off) a'
FW	Ariel Raimonda
FW	Julio César Villagra
Substitutions:
FW	Américo Scatolaro		(substituted on) a'
Manager:
(Argentina) Pedro Marchetta

== Relegation ==
Pos	Team	1984 Pts	1985 Pts	Ap 1986 Pts	1986–87 Pts	Total Pts	Total Pld	Avg	Situation	Affiliation
1	Deportivo Armenio^{1}	—	—	22	62	84	60	1.4		Direct
2	Belgrano	—	—	—	54	54	42	1.286		Indirect
3	Huracán	—	—	—	54	54	42	1.286		Direct
4	Deportivo Maipú	—	—	—	49	49	42	1.167		Indirect
5	Banfield^{1}	43	46	23	54	166	144	1.153		Direct
6	Chaco For Ever	—	—	—	48	48	42	1.143		Indirect
7	Deportivo Mandiyú	—	—	—	48	48	42	1.143		Indirect
8	Lanús^{1}	49	47	21	47	164	144	1.139		Direct
9	Colón^{1}	37	43	21	54	155	144	1.076		Direct
10	Los Andes^{1}	44	47	23	40	154	144	1.069		Direct
11	Defensa y Justicia^{1}	—	—	21	43	64	60	1.067		Direct
12	Tigre^{1}	44	36	23	38	141	144	0.979		Direct
13	Douglas Haig	—	—	—	41	42	42	0.976		Indirect
14	Central Córdoba (SdE)	—	—	—	37	37	42	0.881		Indirect
15	Ferro Carril Oeste (Gral. Pico)	—	—	—	36	36	42	0.857		Indirect
16	Guaraní Antonio Franco	—	—	—	35	35	42	0.833		Indirect
17	Cipolletti	—	—	—	35	35	42	0.833		Indirect
18	Chacarita Juniors^{2}	—	—	—	34	34	42	0.81	Additional Playoff	Direct
19	Gimnasia y Esgrima (J)^{2}	—	—	—	34	34	42	0.81	Additional Playoff	Indirect
20	Central Norte^{2}	—	—	—	34	34	42	0.81	Additional Playoff	Indirect
21	Atlético Concepción	—	—	—	32	32	42	0.762	Relegated to Liga Tucumana	Indirect
22	Unión (Villa Krause)	—	—	—	15	15	42	0.357	Relegated to Liga Sanjuanina	Indirect

1: They kept the points earned in previous editions of the Primera B Metropolitana, although the category was new.

2: They had to play a tiebreaker triangular to see which team was relegated.

Note: Clubs with indirect affiliation with AFA are relegated to their respective league of his province according to the Argentine football league system, while clubs directly affiliated face relegation to Primera B Metropolitana. Clubs with direct affiliation are all from Greater Buenos Aires, with the exception of Newell's, Rosario Central, Central Córdoba and Argentino de Rosario, all from Rosario, and Unión and Colón from Santa Fe.

=== Additional Playoff ===
Chacarita Juniors, Gimnasia y Esgrima (J) and Central Norte were tied in points, they had to play a tiebreaker triangular in a neutral field to see which team was relegated.

Pos	Team	Pld	W	D	L	GF	GA	GD	Pts
1	Chacarita Juniors	2	0	2	0	1	1	0	2
2	Central Norte	2	0	2	0	1	1	0	2
3	Gimnasia y Esgrima (J)	2	0	2	0	0	0	0	2

Relegation Tiebreaker
Home	Result	Away
Central Norte	0 - 0	Gimnasia y Esgrima (J)
Chacarita Juniors	1 - 1	Central Norte
Gimnasia y Esgrima (J)	0 - 0	Chacarita Juniors

As the 3 matches ended in a tie, it was used the overall table and the matches between the 3 teams and Central Norte was the team with less points, so it was relegated to the Liga Salteña de fútbol.

Pos	Team	Pld	W	D	L	GF	GA	GD	Pts
1	Gimnasia y Esgrima (J)	4	2	2	0	9	7	+2	6
2	Chacarita Juniors	4	1	3	0	6	5	+1	5
3	Central Norte (R)	4	0	1	3	4	7	−3	1

(R) Relegated

Home	Result	Away	Round
Chacarita Juniors	1 - 0	Central Norte	Round 2
Central Norte	1 - 2	Gimnasia y Esgrima (J)	Round 5
Gimnasia y Esgrima (J)	2 - 2	Chacarita Juniors	Round 12
Central Norte	1 - 1	Chacarita Juniors	Round 23
Gimnasia y Esgrima (J)	3 - 2	Central Norte	Round 26
Chacarita Juniors	2 - 2	Gimnasia y Esgrima (J)	Round 33

== Top scorers ==
Rank.	Player	Club	Goals
1	(Argentina) José Iglesias	Huracán	36
2	(Argentina) Abel D. Blasón	Belgrano (C)	34
3	(Uruguay) Miguel R. Hernández	Banfield	25

== See also ==
- 1986–87 in Argentine football
