= 1991–92 Copa México =

Tournament details
- Country: Mexico
- Teams: 20

Final positions
- Champions: Monterrey (1st title)
- Runners-up: Cobras

Tournament statistics
- Matches played: 86
- Goals scored: 215 (2.5 per match)

The 1991–92 Copa México is the 64th staging of the Copa México, and the 37th in the professional era.

The competition started on August 9, 1991, and concluded on September 8, 1991, with the Final, in which Monterrey lifted the trophy for first time after a 4–2 victory over Cobras.

This edition was played by 20 teams: first played a group stage, followed by a knock-out stage.

== Group stage ==
Group 1

Pos	Team	Pld	W	D	L	GF	GA	GD	Pts	Qualification
1	Cruz Azul	6	3	2	1	11	7	+4	8	Advances to the next phase
2	Monterrey	6	4	0	2	9	8	+1	8	Advances to the next phase
3	Guadalajara	6	2	1	3	5	7	−2	5	
4	Querétaro	6	1	1	4	5	8	−3	3	

Results

Home \ Away	CAZ	GUA	MON	QUE
Cruz Azul		1–1	2–0	2–1
Guadalajara	0–3		3–0	1–0
Monterrey	4–2	1–0		1–0
Querétaro	1–1	2–0	1–3	

Legend: Blue = home team win; Yellow = draw; Red = away team win.

Group 2

Pos	Team	Pld	W	D	L	GF	GA	GD	Pts	Qualification
1	Tecos UAG	6	3	1	2	11	7	+4	7	Advances to the next phase
2	América	6	3	1	2	9	8	+1	7	
3	Veracruz	6	3	0	3	11	9	+2	6	
4	Santos Laguna	6	1	2	3	8	15	−7	4	

Results

Home \ Away	AMÉ	SLA	UAG	VER
América		3–1	1–3	2–1
Santos Laguna	2–2		0–0	2–1
Tecos UAG	0–1	4–2		2–0
Veracruz	1–0	5–1	3–2	

Legend: Blue = home team win; Yellow = draw; Red = away team win.

Group 3

Pos	Team	Pld	W	D	L	GF	GA	GD	Pts	Qualification
1	Puebla	6	3	3	0	11	5	+6	9	Advances to the next phase
2	U. de G.	6	2	3	1	8	5	+3	7	
3	Tigres UANL	6	1	4	1	11	10	+1	6	
4	UNAM	6	0	2	4	5	15	−10	2	

Results

Home \ Away	PUE	UNL	UDG	UNM
Puebla		1–1	2–0	1–1
UANL	1–4		1–1	5–1
U. de G.	2–2	0–0		2–1
UNAM	0–1	3–3	0–3	

Legend: Blue = home team win; Yellow = draw; Red = away team win.

Group 4

Pos	Team	Pld	W	D	L	GF	GA	GD	Pts	Qualification
1	Cobras	6	4	1	1	6	2	+4	9	Advances to the next phase
2	León	6	3	2	1	7	8	−1	8	Advances to the next phase
3	Necaxa	6	3	0	3	13	5	+8	6	
4	Morelia	6	0	1	5	1	12	−11	1	

Results

Home \ Away	CJU	LEON	MOR	NEC
Cobras Ciudad Juárez		0–0	1–0	1–0
Leon	2–1		2–1	3–2
Morelia	0–2	0–0		0–4
Necaxa	0–1	4–0	3–0	

Legend: Blue = home team win; Yellow = draw; Red = away team win.

Group 5

Pos	Team	Pld	W	D	L	GF	GA	GD	Pts	Qualification
1	Atlante F.C.	6	3	2	1	9	5	+4	8	Advances to the next phase
2	Atlas	6	3	2	1	8	4	+4	8	Advances to the next phase
3	Correcaminos	6	2	2	2	7	8	−1	6	
4	Toluca	6	0	2	4	3	10	−7	2	

Results

Home \ Away	ATE	ATL	TOL	UAT
Atlante		0–0	2–1	5–1
Atlas	2–0		2–0	2–2
Toluca	1–1	1–2		0–0
UAT	0–1	1–0	3–0	

Legend: Blue = home team win; Yellow = draw; Red = away team win.

== Final stage ==
Quarterfinals; September 1
I	Puebla	1 (2)
I	Monterrey	1 (3)
Grupo I: Puebla
I	Cruz Azul	2
I	Atlas	1
II	Atlante F.C.	4
II	León	1
Grupo II: Cd. Juárez
II	Cobras	2
II	Tecos	0

Semifinals; September 4
I	Monterrey	2
I	Cruz Azul	1
II	Cobras	0 (5)
II	Atlante F.C.	0 (3)

Final; September 8
I	Monterrey	4
II	Cobras	2

== Quarterfinals ==
September 1, 1992

Puebla	1 - 1	Monterrey
Aurelio Rivera 15'		Germán Martellotto 7'

Estadio Cuauhtémoc, Puebla City

Monterrey Advanced won 3-2 in Penalty kick

September 1, 1992

Cruz Azul	2 – 1	Atlas
Carlos Hermosillo 31', 86'		Gastón Obledo 70'

Estadio Cuauhtémoc, Puebla City

September 1, 1992

Atlante F.C.	4 – 1	León
Ricardo Rayas 5' (o.g.); Tomás Cruz 11'; Daniel Guzmán 53'; José Alfredo Murguía 88' (o.g.)		Martín Peña 55'

Estadio Olímpico Benito Juárez, Ciudad Juárez

September 1, 1992

Cobras	2 – 0	Tecos
Rodolfo Michel Rodríguez 54'; Sergio Nelson González 70'

Estadio Olímpico Benito Juárez, Ciudad Juárez

== Semifinal ==
September 4, 1992

Monterrey	2 - 1	Cruz Azul
Guillermo Muñoz 16'; Alberto García 80'		Carlos Hermosillo 66'

Estadio Cuauhtémoc, Puebla City

September 4, 1992

Cobras	0 – 0	Atlante F.C.

Estadio Olímpico Benito Juárez, Ciudad Juárez

Cd. Juárez go to the final won 5-3 in penalty

== Final ==
September 8, 1992

Monterrey	4 – 2	Cobras
Germán Martellotto 14', 70'; Guillermo Vázquez 38', 61'		Eduardo Bennett 1'; Víctor Cossío 80'

Estadio Tecnológico, Monterrey

=== Line ups ===
Monterrey: Tirzo Carpizo; Antonio “La Moca” González, Rafael Bautista, Alejandro Hisis y Guillermo Muñoz; Guillermo Vázquez, Alberto “Guamerú” García (José Luis Salgado 82’), Germán Martellotto, Missael Espinoza; Luis Antonio “Cadáver” Valdez y Francisco Javier “El Abuelo” Cruz (Héctor Gutiérrez 82’). Coach: Miguel Mejía Barón
Cobras:

Copa México 1991-92 Winners

1st title
