= Juan Pablo Avendaño =

Argentine footballer

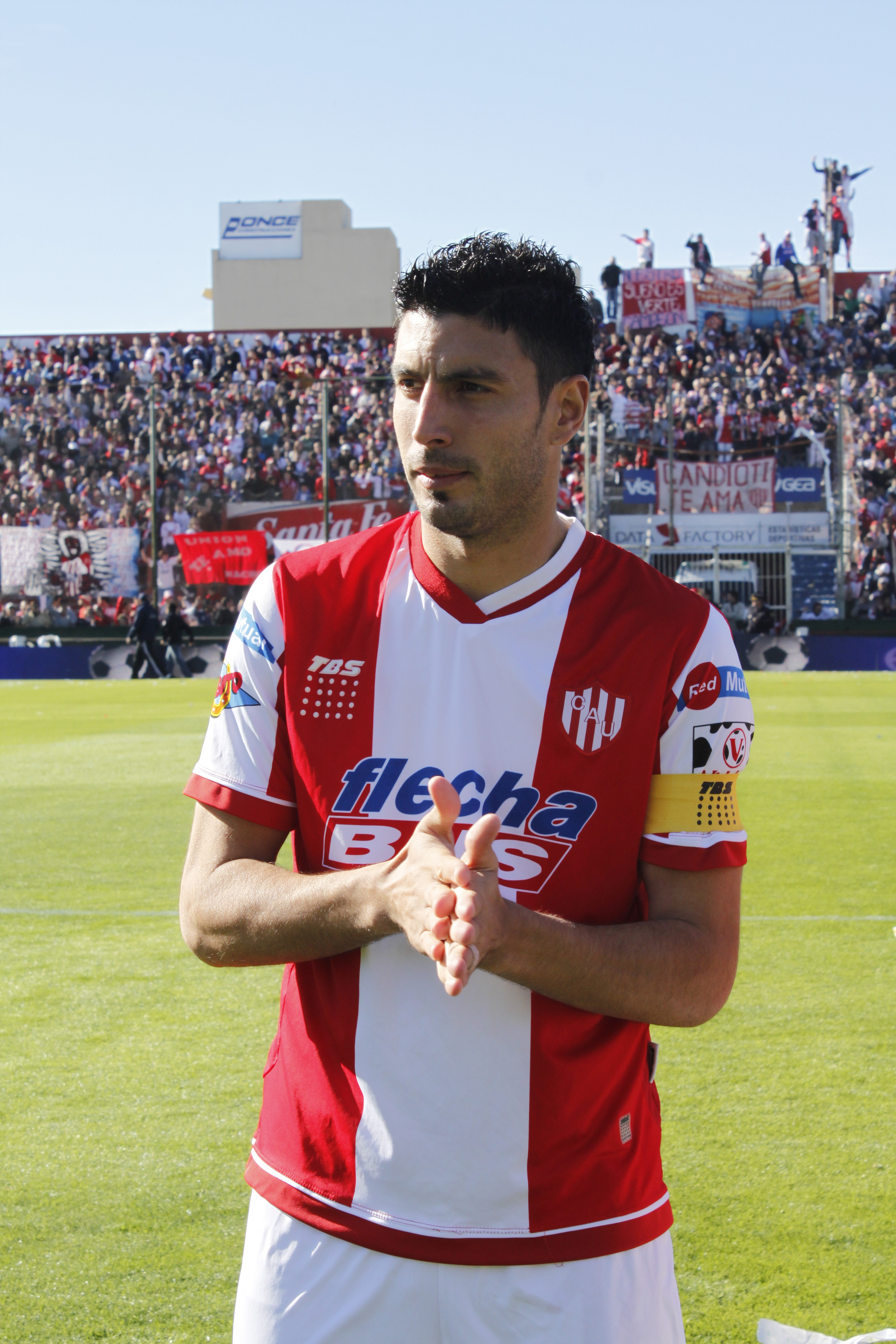

Personal information
- Full name: Juan Pablo Avendaño
- Date of birth: May 10, 1982 (age 44)
- Place of birth: Laguna Larga, Córdoba Province, Argentina
- Height: 1.87 m (6 ft 2 in)
- Position: Centre back

Team information
- Current team: Unión Santa Fe

Senior career*
Years	Team	Apps	(Gls)
2000–2001	Talleres	2	(0)
2001–2002	Los Andes	27	(1)
2002–2004	Talleres	28	(3)
2004–2005	Quilmes	11	(0)
2005	San Luis	12	(1)
2006	Arsenal de Sarandí	11	(1)
2006–2007	Argentinos Juniors	26	(1)
2007–2008	Kayserispor	17	(2)
2008–2009	Skoda Xanthi	3	(0)
2009–2010	Gimnasia de Jujuy	28	(1)
2010–2013	Unión	73	(6)
2013–2014	Talleres	29	(3)
2014–	Unión	3	(1)
- * Club domestic league appearances and goals as of 19 March 2015

Juan Pablo Avendaño (born 10 May 1982 in Laguna Larga, Córdoba Province) is an Argentine footballer who currently plays for Unión de Santa Fe in the Argentine Primera B Nacional.

== Career ==
Avendaño has played for Talleres de Córdoba, Los Andes, Quilmes, Arsenal de Sarandí and Argentinos Juniors in Argentina. He also had a spell in Mexico with San Luis in 2005.

In July 2010, he joined Unión de Santa Fe.

== Honours ==
- Kayserispor
  - Turkish Cup (1): 2008
