= Calchín =

- City
- Location in Argentina
- Coordinates: 31°40′05″S 63°12′00″W
- Country: Argentina
- Province: Córdoba
- Department: Río Segundo

Government
  - Intendant: Claudio Gorgerino (UCR)

Population (2010 Est.)
  - Total: 2,447
- Time zone: UTC−3 (ART)

Calchín is a town located in the Río Segundo Department of Córdoba, Argentina. With only 1,165 homes, it lies on the provincial road No. 13, 110 kilometers (68.4 miles) away from the province's capital city, Córdoba. The Álvarez stream flows through the rural area of the town.

== Economy ==
Calchín’s main economic activities are agriculture and livestock, aside from other services such as rock bolt, turnery and cereal industry. Moreover, a lot of Calchín's economic revenue comes from alfalfa production, including alfalfa pellets (Pellfood).

== Population ==
The 2022 National Institute of Statistics and Census of Argentina (Indec) census counted a total population of 2,918, showing an increase of around 16 per cent over the previous figure (2,447).

== Notable people ==
- Julián Álvarez - Argentina international footballer
- Germán Martellotto - Argentina international footballer
