= Río Segundo Department =

Río Segundo Department Departamento Río Segundo
- Department
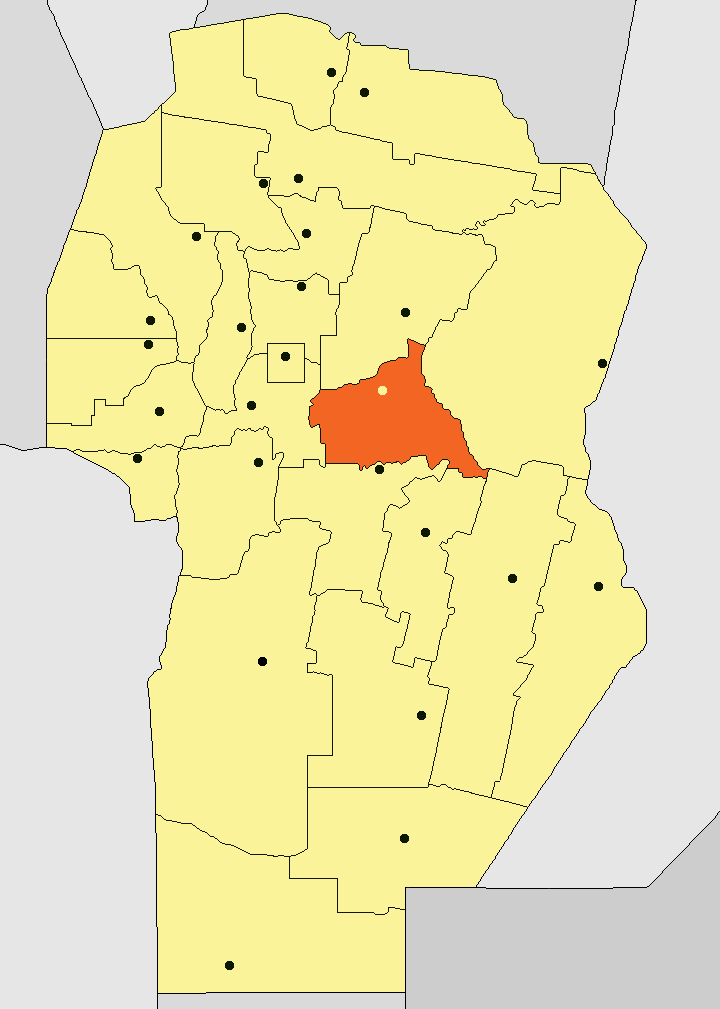
- Location of Río Segundo Department in Córdoba Province
- Coordinates: 31°45′24″S 63°36′36″W
- Country: Argentina
- Province: Córdoba
- Capital: Villa del Rosario

Area
  - Total: 4,970 km^{2} (1,920 sq mi)

Population (2001 census [INDEC])
  - Total: 95,803
  - Density: 19.3/km^{2} (49.9/sq mi)
  - Pop. change (1991-2001): +13.52%
- Time zone: UTC-3 (ART)
- Postal code: X5963
- Dialing code: 0357
- Distances to
- Buenos Aires: 648 km (403 mi)
- Córdoba: 75 km (47 mi)

Río Segundo Department is a department of Córdoba Province in Argentina.

The provincial subdivision has a population in 2001 of 95,803 in an area of 4,970 square kilometres (1,920 sq mi). Its capital city is Villa del Rosario, which is located 648 kilometres (403 mi) from the Buenos Aires.

== Settlements ==
- Calchín
- Calchín Oeste
- Capilla del Carmen
- Carrilobo
- Colazo
- Colonia Videla
- Costa Sacate
- Impira
- Laguna Larga
- Las Junturas
- Los Chañaritos
- Luque
- Manfredi
- Matorrales
- Oncativo
- Pilar
- Pozo del Molle
- Rincón
- Río Segundo
- Santiago Temple
- Villa del Rosario
