= Sergio Maciel =

Argentine footballer

Personal information
- Full name: Sergio Silvano Maciel
- Date of birth: 7 December 1965
- Place of birth: Laferrere
- Date of death: 5 August 2008 (aged 42)
- Height: 1.80 m (5 ft 11 in)
- Position: Forward

Senior career*
Years	Team	Apps	(Gls)
1982–1983	Club Atlético General Lamadrid		
1984–1989	Deportivo Armenio		
1989–1991	FC 08 Homburg		
1991–1992	SpVg Blau-Weiß 90 Berlin		
1992–1995	FC 08 Homburg		
1995–1996	Estudiantes de La Plata		
1996–1997	San Lorenzo de Almagro		
1997	CD Toledo		
1998	Gimnasia y Tiro		

International career
1989	Argentina	2	(0)
- * Club domestic league appearances and goals

Sergio Maciel (7 December 1965 – 5 August 2008) was an Argentine football striker.
