= José Raúl Iglesias =

Argentine footballer

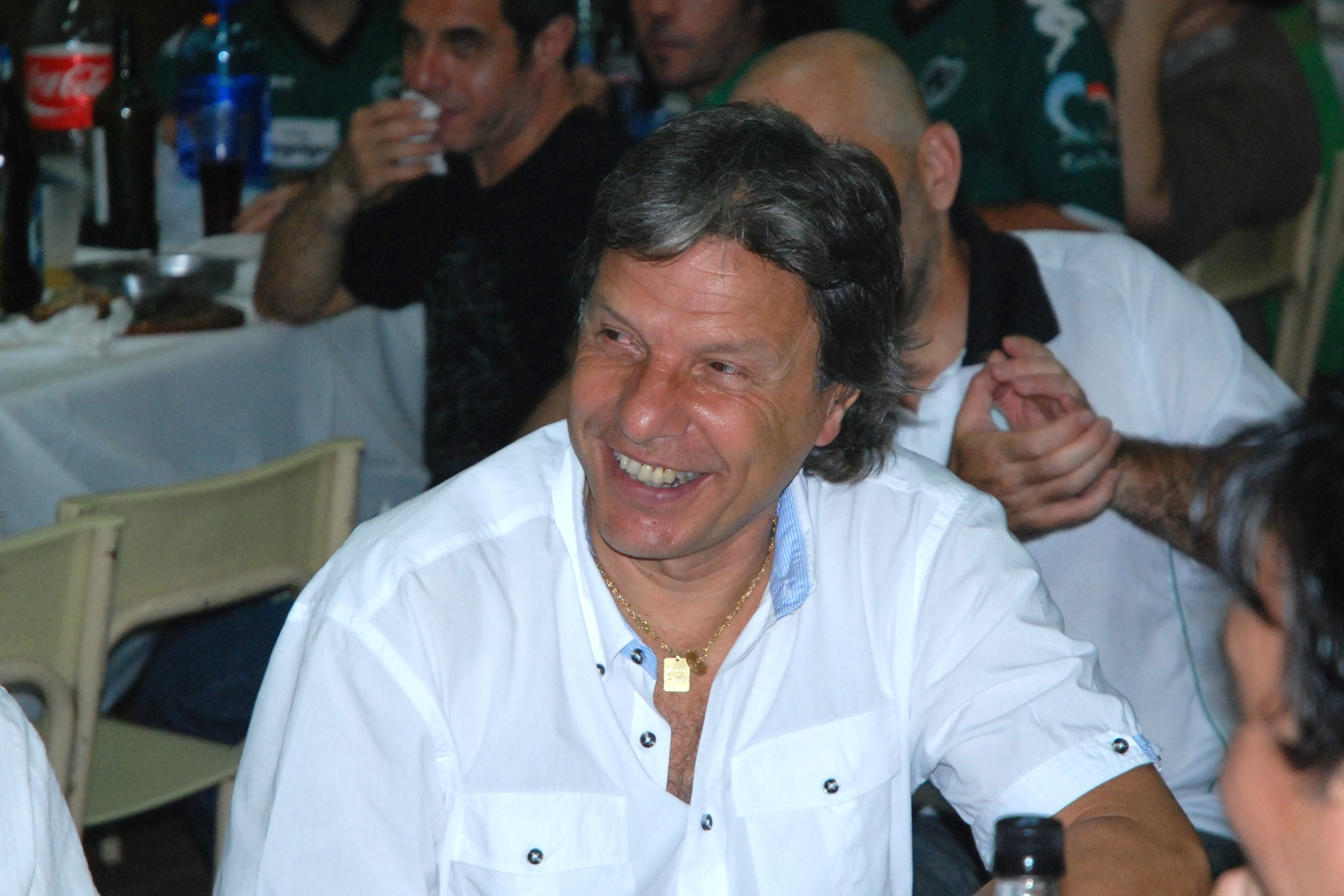
- Iglesias in 2012 during a meeting at Club Atlético Sarmiento, Junín

Personal information
- Full name: José Raúl Iglesias Mastantuono
- Date of birth: 6 March 1957 (age 69)
- Place of birth: Buenos Aires, Argentina
- Position: Forward

Senior career*
Years	Team	Apps	(Gls)
1976–1978	San Lorenzo		
1978	Barcelona B		
1978	Recreativo	2	(0)
1978	Logroñés		
1979	All Boys	6	(1)
1980–1981	Sarmiento	66	(41)
1981–1983	Rosario Central	67	(29)
1983	San Lorenzo		
1984	Valencia	6	(0)
1985	Estudiantes	28	(11)
1986–1987	Huracán	61	(46)
1987–1989	Racing Club	32	(16)
1989	Junior		
1989–1990	Talleres	29	(11)
1990	Deportivo Español	12	(2)
1991	Lanús	14	(4)
Total		323	(161)

Managerial career
- 1998: Badajoz
- * Club domestic league appearances and goals

José Raúl Iglesias (nicknamed Toti), (Buenos Aires, born 6 March 1957) is a retired footballer of Argentina. His position on the field was centre forward, having scored 117 goals in Primera División during his career. He won two championships in lower divisions of Argentina, being the topscorer of the tournament in both cases.

Iglesias is also the top-scorer of the 1980s in Argentine football, having scored 105 goals in 144 matches.

== Biography ==
Born in Boedo, city of Buenos Aires, Iglesias grew up imitating his idol, Luis Artime, a notable forward of the 1960s. He spent his youth career at San Lorenzo de Almagro, debuting in Primera División at 18, in 1976 in a match v. Unión de Santa Fe. Iglesias scored his first goal in Primera that same day, by penalty shoot-out. Alberto Rendo was the coach of San Lorenzo by then.

Iglesias would be later transferred to Sarmiento de Junín, where he became top scorer of the team that won the 1980 Primera B championship.

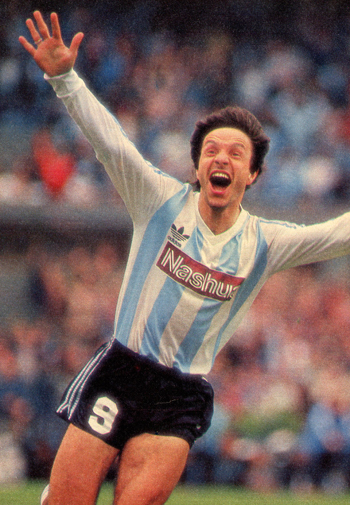
Iglesias celebrating a goal playing for Racing Club

Iglesias had a long career as scorer, becoming an idol for the Sarmiento de Junín and Racing Club de Avellaneda supporters.

"All of my goals were very ugly!"

— Iglesias during an interview.

Iglesias was the Primera B Nacional top scorer at the 1986-87 season playing for Huracán (which also promoted to Primera División) where he scored 36 goals in 37 matches, setting a record for the division. After his tenure on El Globito, Iglesias was traded to Racing Club, where he became an idol for its supporters who also dedicated him a song. Iglesias formed a praised attacking line along with wingers Ramón Medina Bello and Walter Fernández, with the addition of midfielder Miguel Colombatti and Uruguayan playmaker Rubén Paz. His most remembered match playing for Racing was a smashing victory over Boca Juniors by 6–0, with two goals by Iglesias.

Like Mexican striker Hugo Sánchez, Iglesias' trademark was to perform a celebratory somersault after each goal he scored.

"Be prepared, be ready to shout a goal so the Totigol will appear at any time"

— Song by the Racing Club supporters.

In Primera División Iglesias scored 117 goals in 288 matches. Iglesias is the top-scorer of the 1980s in Argentine football, having scored 105 goals in 144 matches. Nevertheless, he was never called up for the Argentina national team.

== Honours ==
Sarmiento (J)

- Primera B (1): 1980

Huracán

- Primera B Nacional (1): 1986-87
