= Julián Alvarez =

Argentine footballer (born 2000)

Julián Álvarez
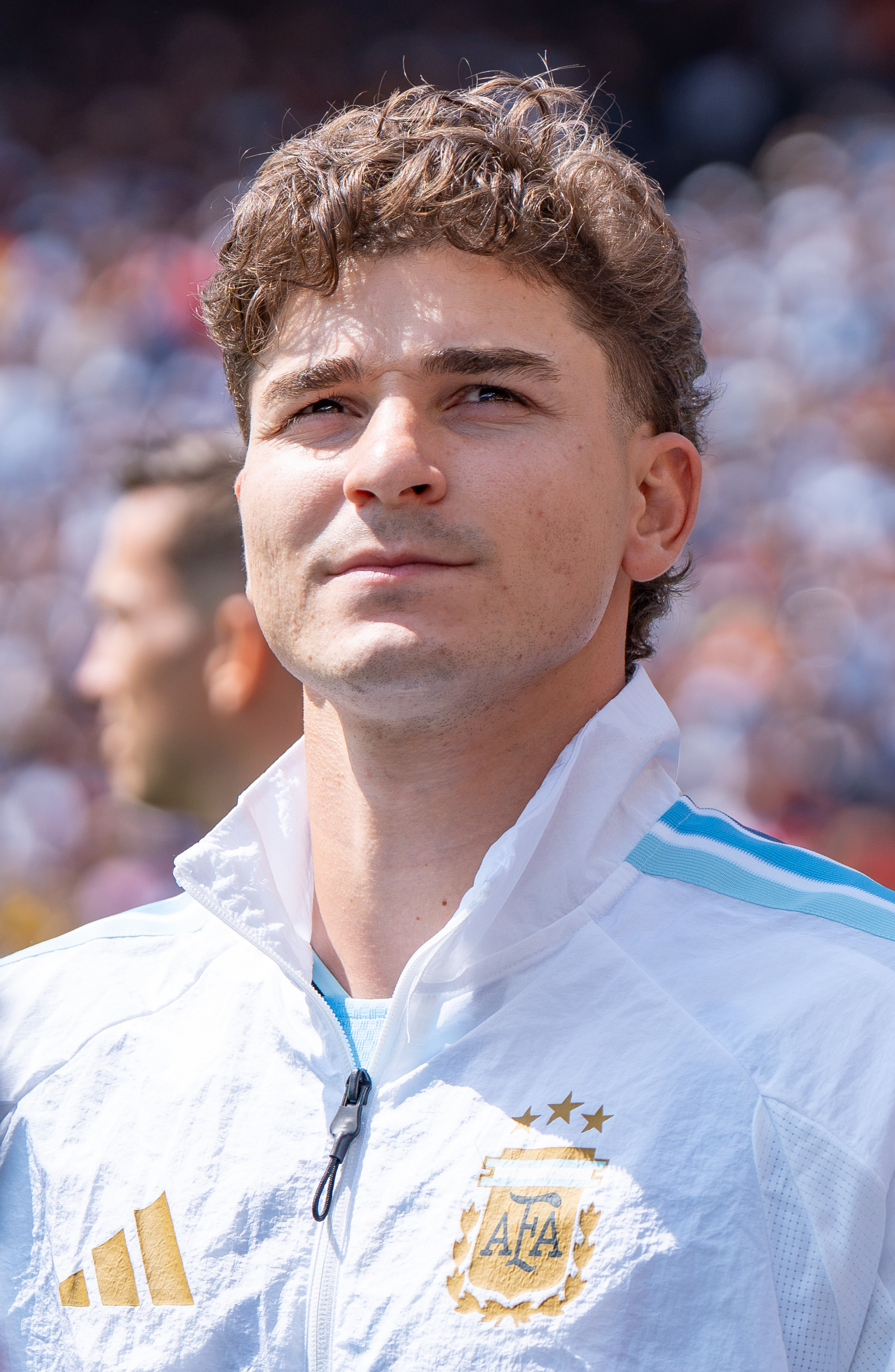
- Alvarez with Argentina in 2026

Personal information
- Full name: Julián Álvarez
- Date of birth: 31 January 2000 (age 26)
- Place of birth: Calchín, Argentina
- Height: 1.70 m (5 ft 7 in)
- Position: Forward

Team information
- Current team: Atlético Madrid
- Number: 19

Youth career
- 2014–2016: Atlético Calchín
- 2016–2019: River Plate

Senior career*
Years	Team	Apps	(Gls)
2018–2022	River Plate	57	(23)
2022–2024	Manchester City	67	(20)
2022	→ River Plate (loan)	17	(11)
2024–	Atlético Madrid	75	(26)

International career^{‡}
2018–2019	Argentina U20	15	(2)
2019–2024	Argentina U23 (O.P.)	11	(1)
2021–	Argentina	64	(19)
Medal record
Men's football
Representing Argentina
FIFA World Cup
Winner	2022 Qatar
Runner-up	2026 Canada–Mexico–US
Copa América
Winner	2021 Brazil
Winner	2024 United States
Finalissima
Winner	2022 England
CONMEBOL Pre-Olympic Tournament
Winner	2020 Colombia
South American U-20 Championship
Runner-up	2019 Chile
- * Club domestic league appearances and goals as of 17:21, 22 November 2026 (UTC) ‡ National team caps and goals as of 01:44, 18 November 2026 (UTC)

Julián Álvarez (Note: His surname can also be found as Álvarez in football statistics databases, football news, and other relative media outlets, and his name as Julian.) (Spanish pronunciation: [xuˈljan ˈalbaɾeθ]; born 31 January 2000) is an Argentine professional footballer who plays as a forward for La Liga club Atlético Madrid and the Argentina national team.

Álvarez began his football career in his native Argentina, where he was an academy graduate of River Plate, making his first-team debut for the club in 2018. There, he spent four seasons and won the Copa Argentina, 2018 Copa Libertadores and the Argentine Primera División in 2021, finishing as the competition's top scorer. He was named the South American Footballer of the Year in 2021. He was signed by Manchester City in 2022, winning a treble of the Premier League, FA Cup and UEFA Champions League in his debut campaign, before leaving for Atlético Madrid in 2024 in a club-record departure deal worth up to €95 million.

Álvarez previously represented Argentina at various youth levels, competing at the 2019 FIFA U-20 World Cup and 2020 CONMEBOL Pre-Olympic Tournament. He made his senior international debut in 2021, and played for the squads that won the 2021 Copa América, the 2022 Finalissima, the 2022 FIFA World Cup,the 2024 Copa América and reached the final of the 2026 FIFA World Cup.

== Club career ==
=== River Plate ===
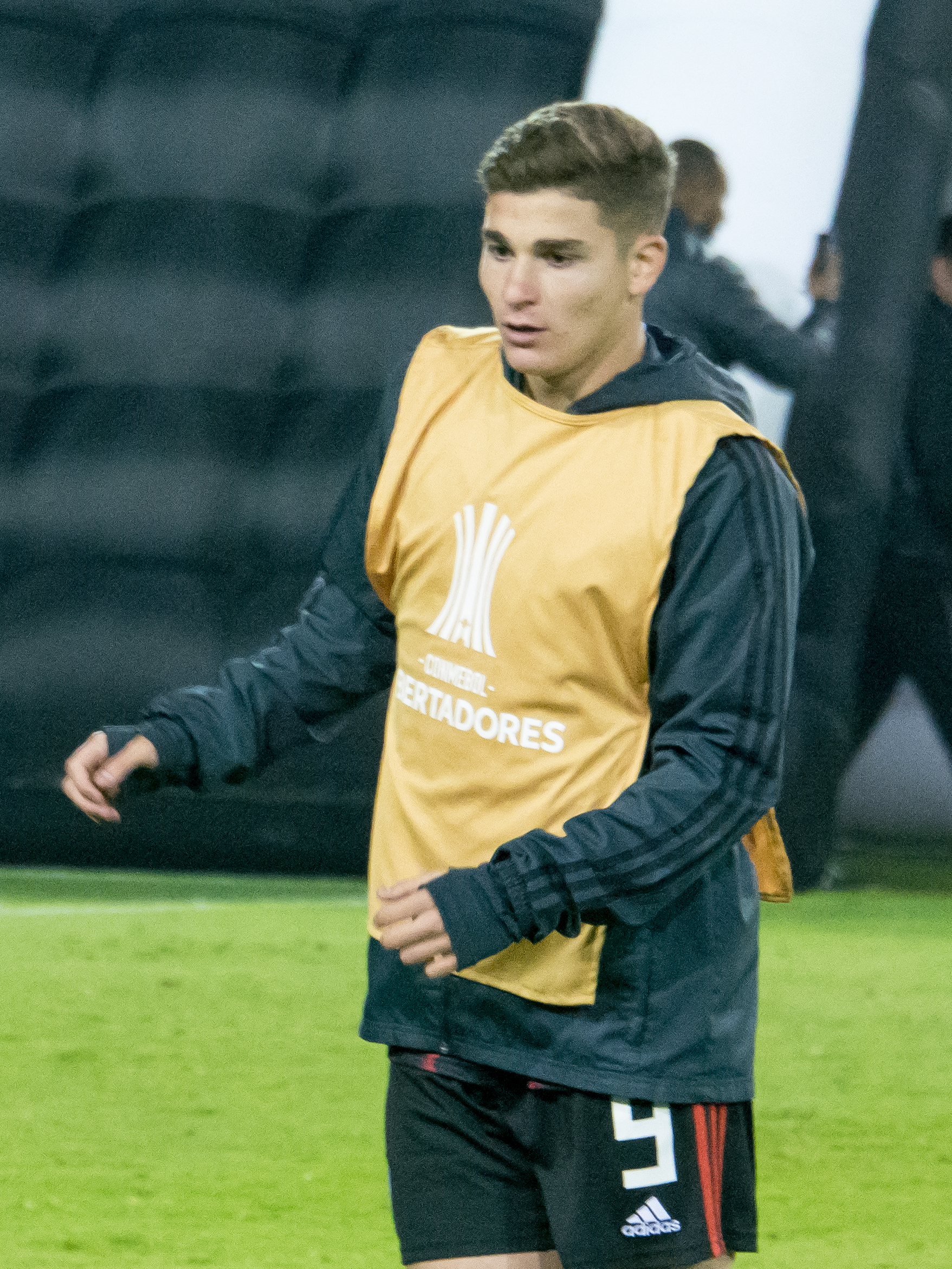
Álvarez training with River Plate in 2019

Álvarez joined River Plate from Atlético Calchín in 2016, notably participating in the Generation Adidas Cup with the club's youth teams. Prior to signing for River, Álvarez had trials with Boca Juniors and Real Madrid, scoring twice in five games for the latter in a youth tournament. He was unable to join Real due to age restrictions. Álvarez was moved into River Plate's senior squad under manager Marcelo Gallardo during the 2018–19 season, with his professional debut arriving on 27 October 2018 during a Primera División fixture with Aldosivi; he was subbed on for Rodrigo Mora with 26 minutes remaining of a 1–0 victory.

Álvarez appeared late on during the second leg of the 2018 Copa Libertadores finals, with River beating rivals Boca Juniors. Álvarez scored the first goal of his senior career on 17 March 2019, netting in a 3–0 league win over Independiente. During the succeeding December, he scored in the 2019 Copa Argentina final against Central Córdoba as River won 3–0 to secure the trophy. In 2020, Álvarez netted five goals in six Copa Libertadores group stage encounters.

On 25 May 2022, Álvarez scored six goals for River Plate in an 8–1 win over Alianza Lima in the Copa Libertadores.

=== Manchester City ===
==== 2022–23: Debut season and continental treble ====
On 31 January 2022, his 22nd birthday, it was confirmed that Álvarez had signed for Premier League champions Manchester City on a five-and-a-half-year contract for a transfer fee in the region of £14 million, and an agreement that the player would remain at River Plate on loan until July.

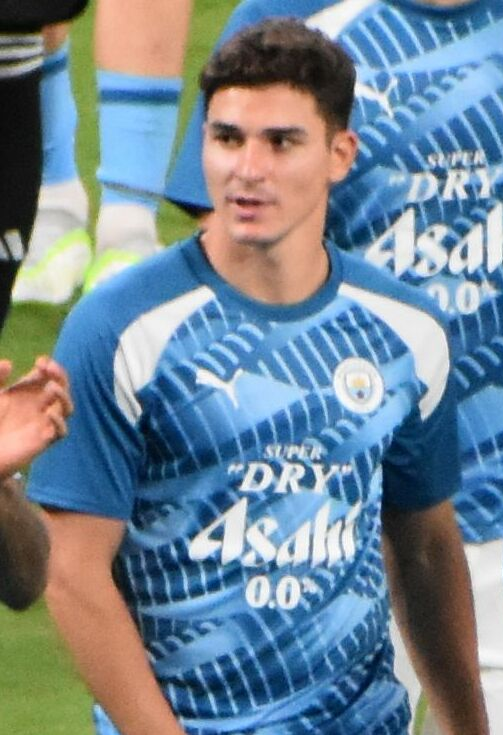
Álvarez with Manchester City in 2023

Álvarez made his competitive debut on 30 July, where City lost 3–1 to rivals Liverpool in the 2022 FA Community Shield, scoring his team's only goal in the process. On 7 August, Álvarez made his Premier League debut after coming on as a substitute for Erling Haaland in a 2–0 away win over West Ham United. On 31 August, Álvarez scored his first two Premier League goals in a 6–0 win against Nottingham Forest at the City of Manchester Stadium. On 5 October, he scored his first UEFA Champions League goal in a 5–0 win over Copenhagen.

On 17 May 2023, Álvarez scored the last goal in a 4–0 win over Real Madrid in the Champions League semi-final second leg, which cemented his club's qualification to the final. Four days later, he scored the only goal in a 1–0 victory over Chelsea to win his first Premier League title, and third in a row for his club. On 10 June, he won the Champions League final with his club, despite being a non-playing substitute, to become among the players who won the FIFA World Cup and Champions League in the same season, in addition to achieving both the latter and the Copa Libertadores. With this, he also became the first ever player in football history to win the World Cup and a continental treble in the same season.

==== 2023–24: Starting eleven breakthrough and departure ====
On 19 August, Álvarez netted the lone goal in a 1–0 victory over Newcastle United. Following the injuries of Bernardo Silva and Kevin De Bruyne, Álvarez began featuring more regularly in the starting eleven, registering four goal contributions in his next Premier League matches, including two assists in a 3–1 away win over West Ham United on 16 September. Three days later, he scored a brace in City's 3–1 home win over Red Star Belgrade in the UEFA Champions League. Álvarez finished in 7th place in the 2023 Ballon d'Or. On 22 December, Manchester City defeated Fluminense 4–0 in the 2023 FIFA Club World Cup final as Álvarez scored a brace and provided an assist to claim his first Club World Cup title and finish the tournament as top scorer; with his first goal being the fastest in the competition's history at 40 seconds. On 4 May 2024, Álvarez made his 100th appearance for City, marking it with a late goal in a 5–1 league win over Wolverhampton Wanderers.

=== Atlético Madrid ===
==== 2024–25: Debut season ====
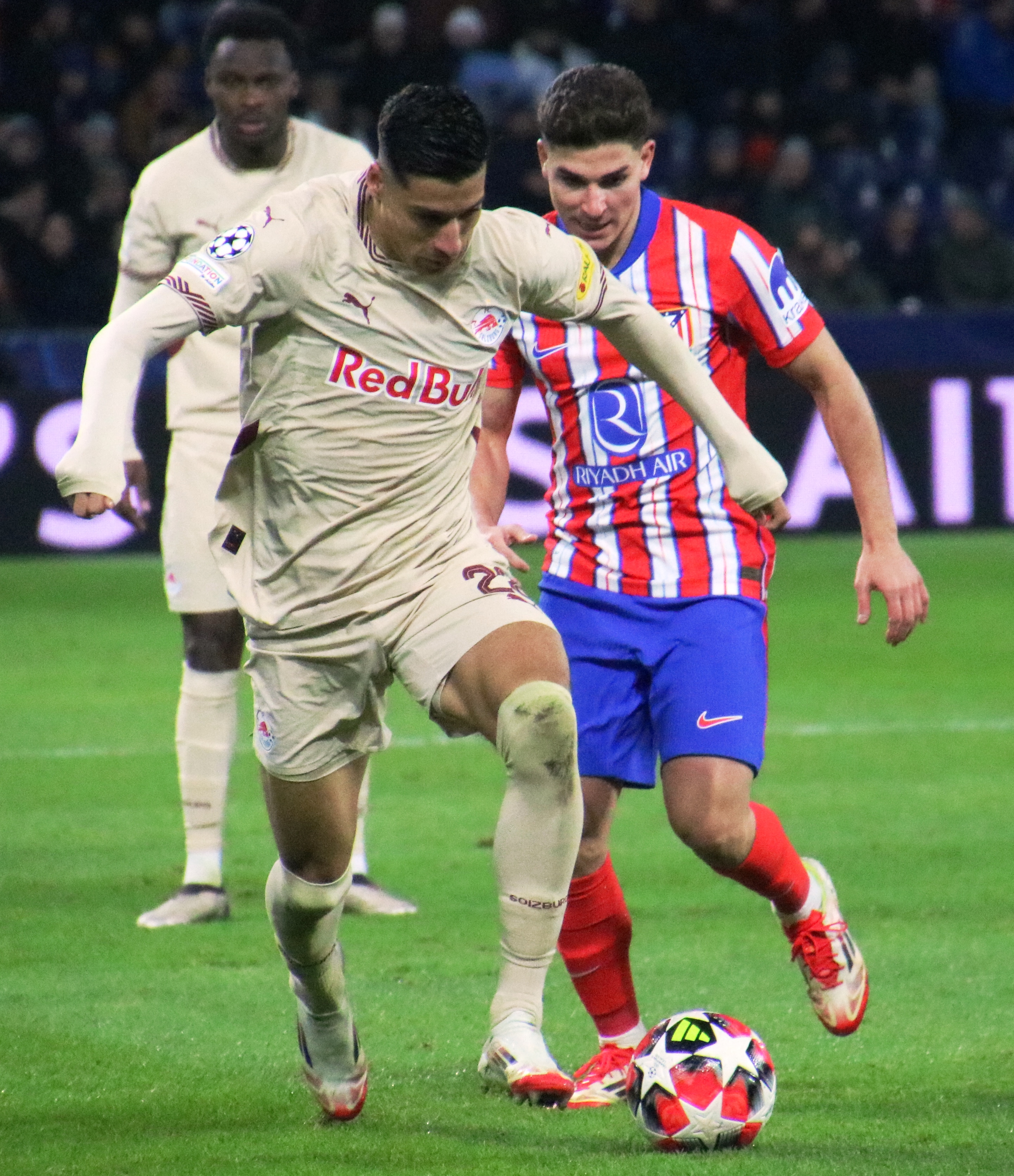
Álvarez (right) playing for Atlético Madrid against Red Bull Salzburg in 2025

On 12 August 2024, La Liga club Atlético Madrid confirmed the signing of Álvarez on a six-year deal reportedly worth up to €95 million (£81.8 million) with a release clause of €500 million (£427.1 million). His signing became a club-record departure for City.

On 19 August, he made his debut for the club, as a substitute, in a 2–2 draw against Villarreal in the league. On 15 September, Álvarez scored his first goal for the club in the 90th minute of a 3–0 victory over Valencia. On 12 March 2025, Atlético Madrid and Real Madrid went to penalties after tying 2–2 on aggregate in the round of 16 of the UEFA Champions League. Álvarez took Atlético's second penalty, but slipped as he took it yet appeared to successfully convert it. However, through the video assistant referee it was determined that Álvarez had slightly touched the ball with his standing foot before striking it, causing the goal to be disallowed for double-touching the ball. Real Madrid would go on to win the penalty shoot-out 4–2 and advance to the next round. A day later, UEFA released a statement explaining that the decision to disallow Álvarez's penalty was the correct one, but that they would enter discussions with FIFA and IFAB to determine whether the rule should be reviewed in cases in which the double touch is clearly unintentional. He concluded his debut season with Atlético Madrid as the club's top scorer in all competitions, registering 29 goals and six assists.

==== 2025–26: Record-breaking season and transfer dispute ====
On 24 September 2025, he scored a winning hat-trick in a 3–2 victory against Rayo Vallecano. On 29 April 2026, he converted a penalty in a 1–1 draw against Arsenal in the Champions League semi-final first leg, reaching a club-record ten goals in a single campaign, and becoming the fastest South American player to reach 25 goals in the competition, doing so in 41 matches and surpassing the previous record held by Lionel Messi.

"I don't think it's the right moment to talk, but I also don't want to hide. I try to be an honest person. I spoke with the people at [Atlético] who I needed to speak with. I think the best thing for everyone is a transfer. I want to fulfil my dream"

— Julián Alvarez expresses his desire for a transfer in an interview with ESPN following Argentina's 2-0 win over Austria at the World Cup.

At the conclusion of the 2025–26 season, Álvarez became the subject of intense transfer interest from Barcelona, whose pursuit of the forward sparked tensions between the two clubs. Álvarez was the subject of a record-breaking bid of €150 million from Real Madrid on 9 June 2026 following Real club president Florentino Pérez' election campaign promise to sign a Galáctico. However, Atlético swiftly rejected the offer, reaffirming their intention to retain one of the team's key players. During the 2026 FIFA World Cup, Álvarez publicly announced his desire to leave Atlético Madrid, stating that he believed "the best for everyone involved is a transfer" and that he wanted to "fulfil [his] dream". His comments intensified speculation over a move to Barcelona and prompted Atlético chief executive Miguel Ángel Gil Marín to accuse Barcelona of negotiating with a player under contract, describing the club's conduct as "disrespectful" and confirming that Atlético intended to file a formal complaint with FIFA over the matter.

==== 2026–27 ====
On 23 August 2026, Álvarez was jeered and whistled by sections of Atlético Madrid's fans when he came on as a 66th-minute substitute against Villarreal, amid ongoing transfer rumors. Following the match that ended in a 2–2 draw, Álvarez left the pitch while his teammates remained on the field to applaud and thank the fans for their support. In a post-match press conference, Atlético Madrid manager Diego Simeone stated that Álvarez's decision to leave the pitch was a "club decision". Four days later, Atlético Madrid ruled out negotiating the transfer of Álvarez to Barcelona, with the club's board of directors unanimously expressing its support for the decision, stating that there would be "no negotiation" over his transfer to the rival club. On 24 October, Álvarez apologised to Atlético Madrid supporters for attempting to leave the club during the summer, describing his actions as a "mistake" and acknowledging the fans' anger. His apology followed a 1–0 victory over Deportivo de A Coruña, in which he scored the winning goal.

== International career ==
=== 2018–2020: Youth career ===
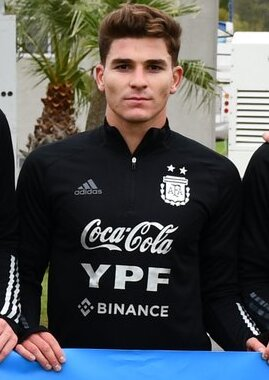
Álvarez with Argentina in 2022

In 2018, Álvarez was selected by the Argentina U-20s to train against the senior team at the 2018 FIFA World Cup. In December, Álvarez was picked for the 2019 South American U-20 Championship. In preparation for the 2019 FIFA U-20 World Cup, he scored the second goal against Saudi Arabia in what was a 5–0 victory, during a friendly tournament played in Spain. After that, he received a call-up from Fernando Batista for the 2019 FIFA U-20 World Cup in May 2019. Four matches and one goal, versus South Africa, arrived for him in Poland. Batista subsequently called Álvarez up for the Olympic Team in the succeeding September, which preceded his selection for the 2020 CONMEBOL Pre-Olympic Tournament; which Argentina won, with Álvarez scoring once (versus Venezuela) in seven matches.

=== 2021–2024: Senior debut, Copa América and World Cup triumphs ===
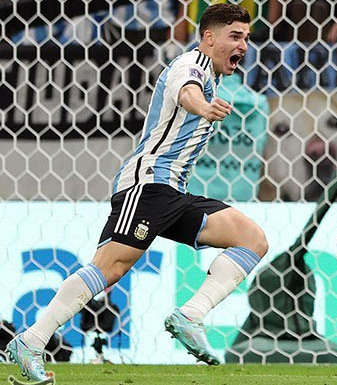
Álvarez playing for Argentina at the 2022 FIFA World Cup

Álvarez made his debut for the Argentina senior team on 3 June 2021, in a World Cup qualifier against Chile as a 62nd-minute substitute for Ángel Di María. He made his second appearance in a 4–1 victory over Bolivia in the final group-stage match of the 2021 Copa América, coming on as a second-half substitute. Argentina went on to win the tournament, defeating Brazil in the final to claim their 15th Copa América title and Álvarez's first major international trophy. On 29 March 2022, he scored his first international goal in a 1–1 draw against Ecuador.

On 11 November 2022, Álvarez was included in Lionel Scaloni's 26-man squad for the 2022 FIFA World Cup in Qatar. On 30 November, he scored his first World Cup goal in a 2–0 win in the last group stage match against Poland. He followed with a second World Cup goal on 3 December, when he scored in Argentina's 2–1 win against Australia in the Round of 16. He continued his scoring streak by adding two more goals in Argentina's 3–0 win against Croatia in the semi-finals, becoming the youngest player since Pelé in 1958 to score two goals in a World Cup semi-final at 22 years, 316 days old. On 18 December 2022, he was involved in Argentina's second goal as his team defeated France 4–2 on penalties after the match ended 3–3 in extra-time of the final to win the World Cup.

Álvarez scored against Canada in both the opening match and the semi-final of the 2024 Copa América, helping Argentina reach the final. Argentina went on to defeat Colombia in the final, securing a record 16th Copa América title and successfully defending the trophy, while Álvarez won his second Copa América title with the national team. He later competed for Argentina at the 2024 Summer Olympics.

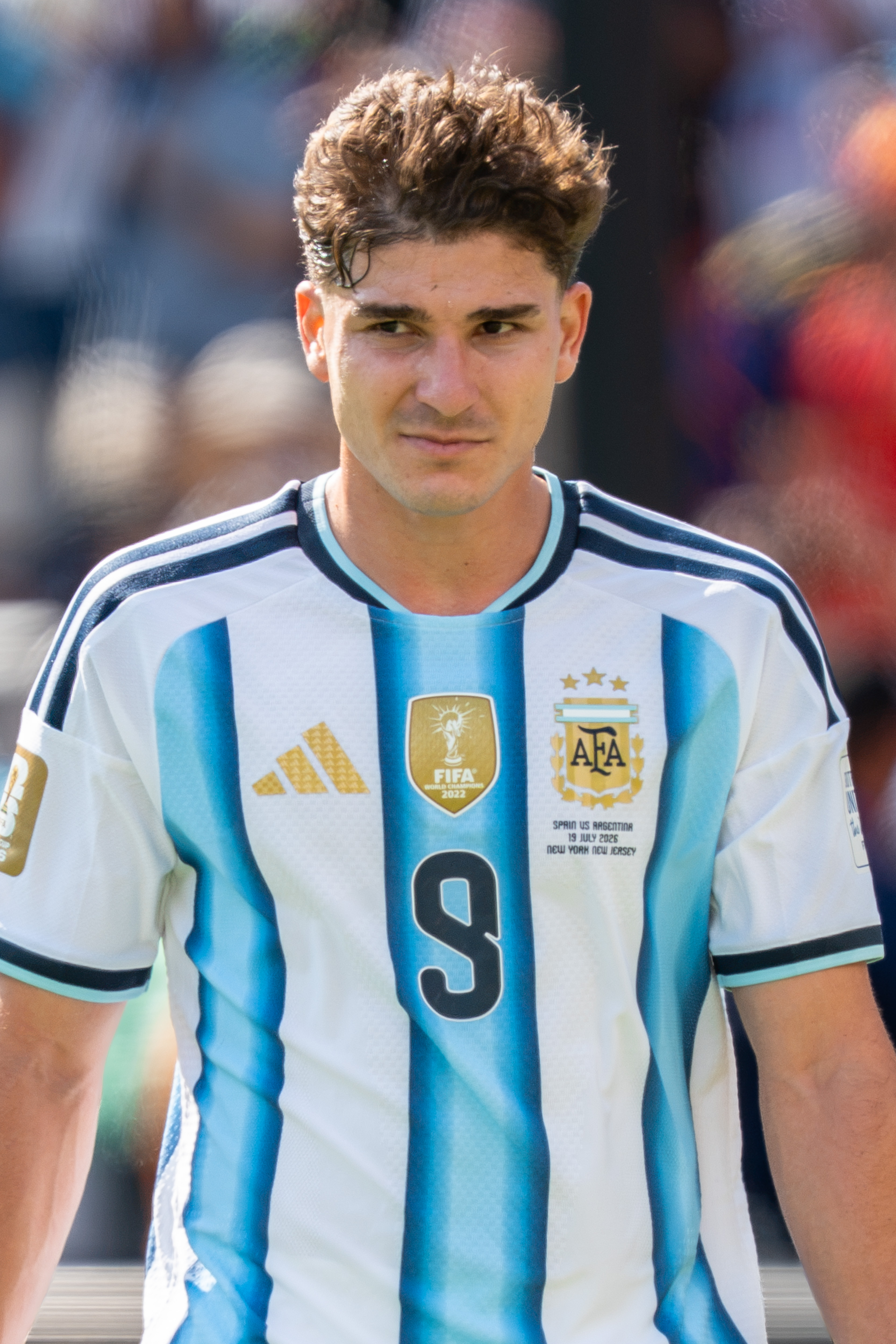
Álvarez with Argentina at the 2026 FIFA World Cup

=== 2026 World Cup ===
On 27 May 2026, Álvarez was selected in the 26-man squad for the 2026 FIFA World Cup. In the round of 16 match against Egypt, Álvarez was at the centre of a controversial incident as Argentina came from behind, after initially going down 2–0, to win the match 3–2 late in the game. In the build-up to Enzo Fernández's match-winning goal in injury time, Mohamed Salah lost the ball and went to ground after being tackled by Álvarez inside the Argentine penalty area; despite protests from the Egyptian players and staff for an alleged foul on Salah, the goal stood, a decision which drew criticism from some media outlets, who likened the incident to the earlier foul on Lisandro Martínez that had led Mostafa Ziko's goal to be disallowed by referee François Letexier following VAR review. In the quarter-final against Switzerland, he was named Man of the Match after scoring a decisive second goal in the 112th minute with an outside-the-box curler in a 3–1 victory following extra time. Álvarez started in the final against Spain, which Argentina lost 1–0 after extra time.

== Style of play ==
Álvarez is regarded as a versatile forward capable of playing across the front line. He has been noted for his pace, closing ability and control, and scoring ability from difficult positions. Commentators have also noted his link-up play, passing ability, vision, and movement such as quick passes and one-touch football. He also is recognized for his work rate on and off the ball, while also contributing to pressing opponents. Álvarez has also been described as an effective free-kick taker, scoring several free-kicks during his career in Europe.

Álvarez is known for his first touch being composed and intentional, with his ability of both killing a ball dead or kicking it away from defenders in his path. While not being known as a particularly skillful dribbler, Álvarez is described as a powerful runner. His slightly hunched running style is said to allow him to win challenges and protect the ball effectively, and there is a noted aggression to his carrying that makes him difficult to stop. Álvarez has typically played in a two-striker system in a team with an extremely settled style of play.

In the 2023–24 season, Manchester City manager Pep Guardiola often used Álvarez as an attacking midfielder in the absence of Kevin De Bruyne. Álvarez's intelligent running, passing and possession have led to him thriving in this position, and he has often been lauded by pundits for successfully adapting to the requirements of the new position.

== Personal life ==
Álvarez holds an Italian passport due to his Italian heritage, allowing him to register in La Liga as an EU player.

Álvarez's brothers, Agustín and Rafael, are also footballers. Both played for non-league team Abbey Hey when Julián was a Manchester City player. In 2025, Julián's brothers signed for Club Argentino, a team that competes in the Segunda Regional of Madrid.

Álvarez is in a relationship with fellow Argentine Maria Emilia Ferrero. On 22 June 2025, the couple announced that they were expecting their first child, a boy. He was born on 2 January 2026.

Álvarez's nickname is "La Araña" (the spider) or "El Hombre Araña" (Spider-Man), reflecting his web-shooter goal celebration.

== Career statistics ==
=== Club ===
As of match played 22 November 2026

Appearances and goals by club, season and competition
Club	Season	League			National cup (Note: Includes Copa Argentina, FA Cup, Copa del Rey)		League cup (Note: Includes Copa de la Liga Profesional, EFL Cup)		Continental		Other		Total	
Club	Season	Division	Apps	Goals	Apps	Goals	Apps	Goals	Apps	Goals	Apps	Goals	Apps	Goals
River Plate	2018–19	Argentine Primera División	5	5	1	0	—		1 (Note: Appearance(s) in Copa Libertadores)	0	1 (Note: Appearance(s) in FIFA Club World Cup)	0	8	5
River Plate	2019–20	Argentine Primera División	7	0	3	1	2	0	5	1	—		17	2
River Plate	2020	Argentine Primera División	10	2	3	1	1	1	11	5	—		25	9
River Plate	2021	Argentine Primera División	35	20	—		—		10	2	1 (Note: Appearance in Trofeo de Campeones de la Liga Profesional)	2	46	24
River Plate	2022	Argentine Primera División	17	11	1	1	0	0	8	6	0	0	26	18
River Plate	Total		74	34	8	3	3	1	35	14	2	2	122	54
Manchester City	2022–23	Premier League	31	9	5	3	2	1	10 (Note: Appearances in UEFA Champions League)	3	1 (Note: Appearance in FA Community Shield)	1	49	17
Manchester City	2023–24	Premier League	36	11	6	1	1	0	7	5	4 (Note: One appearance in FA Community Shield, one appearance in UEFA Super Cup, two appearances and two goals in FIFA Club World Cup)	2	54	19
Manchester City	Total		67	20	11	4	3	1	17	8	5	3	103	36
Atlético Madrid	2024–25	La Liga	37	17	7	5	—		10	7	3	0	57	29
Atlético Madrid	2025–26	La Liga	29	8	4	2	—		15	10	1 (Note: Appearance in Supercopa de España)	0	49	20
Atlético Madrid	2026–27	La Liga	9	1	0	0	—		4	1	0	0	13	2
Atlético Madrid	Total		75	26	11	7	—		29	18	4	0	119	51
Career total			216	80	30	14	6	2	81	40	11	5	344	141

=== International ===
As of match played 18 November 2026

Appearances and goals by national team and year
National team	Year	Apps	Goals
Argentina	2021	5	0
Argentina	2022	14	7
Argentina	2023	9	0
Argentina	2024	14	4
Argentina	2025	7	2
Argentina	2026	15	6
Total		64	19

Scores and results list Argentina's goal tally first, score column indicates score after each Álvarez goal.

List of international goals scored by Julián Álvarez
No.	Date	Venue	Cap	Opponent	Score	Result	Competition	Ref.
1	29 March 2022	Estadio Monumental Isidro Romero Carbo, Guayaquil, Ecuador	7	Ecuador	1–0	1–1	2022 FIFA World Cup qualification	
2	27 September 2022	Red Bull Arena, Harrison, United States	11	Jamaica	1–0	3–0	Friendly	
3	16 November 2022	Zayed Sports City Stadium, Abu Dhabi, United Arab Emirates	12	United Arab Emirates	1–0	5–0	Friendly	
4	30 November 2022	Stadium 974, Doha, Qatar	15	Poland	2–0	2–0	2022 FIFA World Cup	
5	4 December 2022	Ahmad bin Ali Stadium, Al Rayyan, Qatar	16	Australia	2–0	2–1	2022 FIFA World Cup	
6	13 December 2022	Lusail Stadium, Lusail, Qatar	18	Croatia	2–0	3–0	2022 FIFA World Cup	
7	13 December 2022	Lusail Stadium, Lusail, Qatar	18	Croatia	3–0	3–0	2022 FIFA World Cup	
8	20 June 2024	Mercedes-Benz Stadium, Atlanta, United States	32	Canada	1–0	2–0	2024 Copa América	
9	9 July 2024	MetLife Stadium, East Rutherford, United States	35	Canada	1–0	2–0	2024 Copa América	
10	5 September 2024	Estadio Monumental, Buenos Aires, Argentina	37	Chile	2–0	3–0	2026 FIFA World Cup qualification	
11	15 October 2024	Estadio Monumental, Buenos Aires, Argentina	40	Bolivia	3–0	6–0	2026 FIFA World Cup qualification	
12	25 March 2025	Estadio Monumental, Buenos Aires, Argentina	44	Brazil	1–0	4–1	2026 FIFA World Cup qualification	
13	5 June 2025	Estadio Nacional Julio Martínez Prádanos, Santiago, Chile	45	Chile	1–0	1–0	2026 FIFA World Cup qualification	
14	31 March 2026	La Bombonera, Buenos Aires, Argentina	51	Zambia	1–0	5–0	Friendly	
15	11 July 2026	Arrowhead Stadium, Kansas City, United States	57	Switzerland	2–1	3–1 (a.e.t.)	2026 FIFA World Cup	
16	3 October 2026	Estadio Monumental, Buenos Aires, Argentina	61	Burkina Faso	5–0	7–0	Friendly	
17	13 November 2026	Estadio La Bombonera, Buenos Aires, Argentina	62	Uruguay	1–2	1–2	Friendly	
18	17 November 2026	Estadio Mario Alberto Kempes, Córdoba, Argentina	64	Costa Rica	2–0	7–0	Friendly	
19	17 November 2026	Estadio Mario Alberto Kempes, Córdoba, Argentina	64	Costa Rica	4–0	7–0	Friendly	

== Honours ==
River Plate

- Argentine Primera División: 2021
- Copa Argentina: 2018–19
- Supercopa Argentina: 2019
- Trofeo de Campeones: 2021
- Copa Libertadores: 2018

Manchester City

- Premier League: 2022–23, 2023–24
- FA Cup: 2022–23; runner-up: 2023–24
- UEFA Champions League: 2022–23
- UEFA Super Cup: 2023
- FIFA Club World Cup: 2023

Atlético Madrid

- Copa del Rey runner-up: 2025–26

Argentina U23

- CONMEBOL Pre-Olympic Tournament: 2020

Argentina

- FIFA World Cup: 2022; runner-up: 2026
- Copa América: 2021, 2024
- Finalissima: 2022

Individual

- South American Youth Championship Team of the Tournament: 2019
- Argentine Primera División Top Scorer: 2021
- South American Footballer of the Year: 2021
- IFFHS Men's CONMEBOL Team: 2022, 2025
- La Liga Team of the Season: 2024–25

== See also ==
- List of FIFA World Cup top goalscorers
