= Thiago Prieto =

Argentine footballer

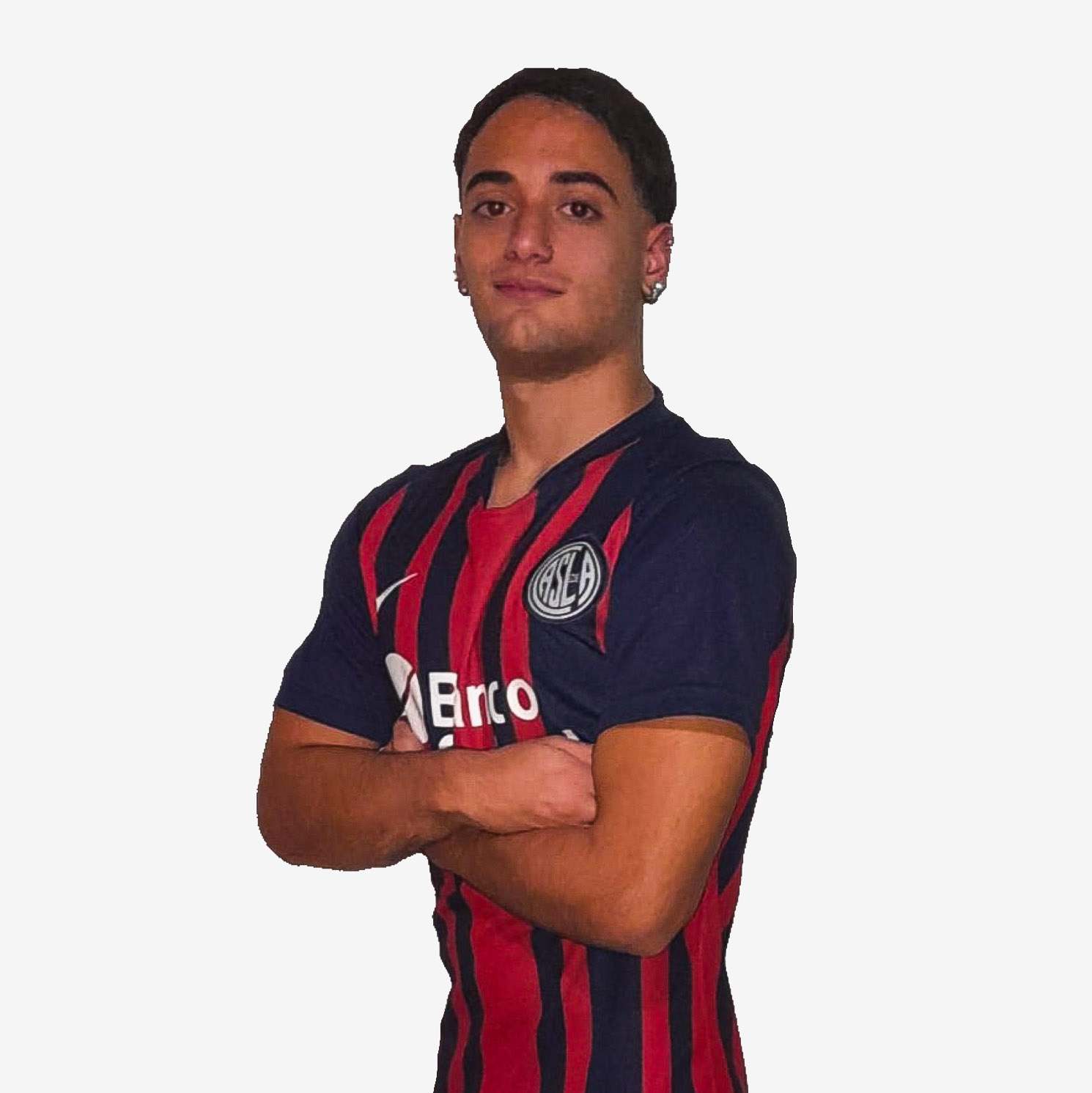
- Prieto in 2021

Personal information
- Full name: Thiago Prieto Acosta
- Date of birth: 5 November 2003 (age 23)
- Place of birth: Laguna Larga, Córdoba, Argentina
- Height: 1.76 m (5 ft 9 in)
- Position: Centre-back

Youth career
- 2005–2013: Porvenir de Gerli (football)
- 2012–2018: Barracas Central
- 2019–2020: Independiente

Senior career*
Years	Team	Apps	(Gls)
2019–2020	Independiente	27	(12)
2020–	San Lorenzo de Almagro		

International career
	Argentina	7	(1)
- * Club domestic league appearances and goals

Thiago Prieto Acosta (Spanish pronunciation: [ˈtjaɣo ˈpɾjeto aˈkosta]; born 5 November 2003) is an Argentine futsal player who plays as a centre-back for San Lorenzo.

Born in Laguna Larga, Córdoba, Argentina, Prieto began his youth career with Independiente in 2015, progressing through the academy until 2020. He made his senior debut for Independiente in 2016, going on to make 27 appearances and score 12 goals for the club between 2016 and 2019.

In 2020, he joined San Lorenzo de Almagro. He is recognized for being one of the youngest players to become champion of the Copa CONMEBOL Libertadores, which he obtained in Uruguay in 2021.

At international level, Prieto has represented the Argentina national team, making seven appearances and scoring one goal.

== Biography ==
He was born on November 5, 2003, in Laguna Larga, province of Córdoba, Argentina. His parents are Ariel Prieto and Mariela Rita Acosta, both originally from the province of Buenos Aires, (Argentina). He is studying in the last educational year of high school, at the Colegio de Independiente de Avellaneda (club in which he played), where he was flagged. He is currently enrolled in the Cenard to continue with his studies in the career of Physical Education Teacher.

== Career ==
Thiago Prieto arrived at Independiente in 2015. Five years later, the centre-back made the breakthrough into first-team football under manager Lucas Pusineri. He initially trained with the club in pre-season, notably appearing in a friendly win over Boca Juniors. Prieto's senior debut occurred on 6 December 2020 in a Copa de la Liga Profesional victory over Defensa y Justicia, as he played eighty-eight minutes before being replaced by Lucas Rodriguez He penned terms on a contract until December 2020 on 15 December 2018. Then he became a San Lorenzo de Almagro player for the 2020 season, where Thiago was crowned local champion of the bullring.

== National selection ==
Thiago was summoned to integrate and form the youth squad of the Argentine team in 2019 in a friendly way in the U-15 and in 2020 officially. He was summoned by Diego Guiustozzi and Nicolas Guliza to play the qualifying rounds for the 2021 U17 World Cup in which he played 7 games and scored 1 goal. This World Cup that was based in Asunción, (Paraguay) which Thiago was on the list in good faith to play the same. He was canceled due to the measures implied by FIFA due to the health situation that the world is going through due to COVID-19

== Trajectory ==
- (Argentina) Club Barracas Central (2012–2018)
- (Argentina) Independiente (2019–2020)
- (Argentina) San Lorenzo (2020-act)
- (Argentina) Porvenir de Gerli (2005–2013) (Fútbol 11)

== Personal life ==
Thiago has been in a single relationship with the Argentine singer Candela Correa since September 1, 2019. He is studying the last year of his training career as a regular almuno where he receives sports honors. He also owns a pizzeria called "Hea" in the town of Avellaneda, Buenos Aires.
