= Matorrales =

Town in Córdoba, Argentina

- Municipality
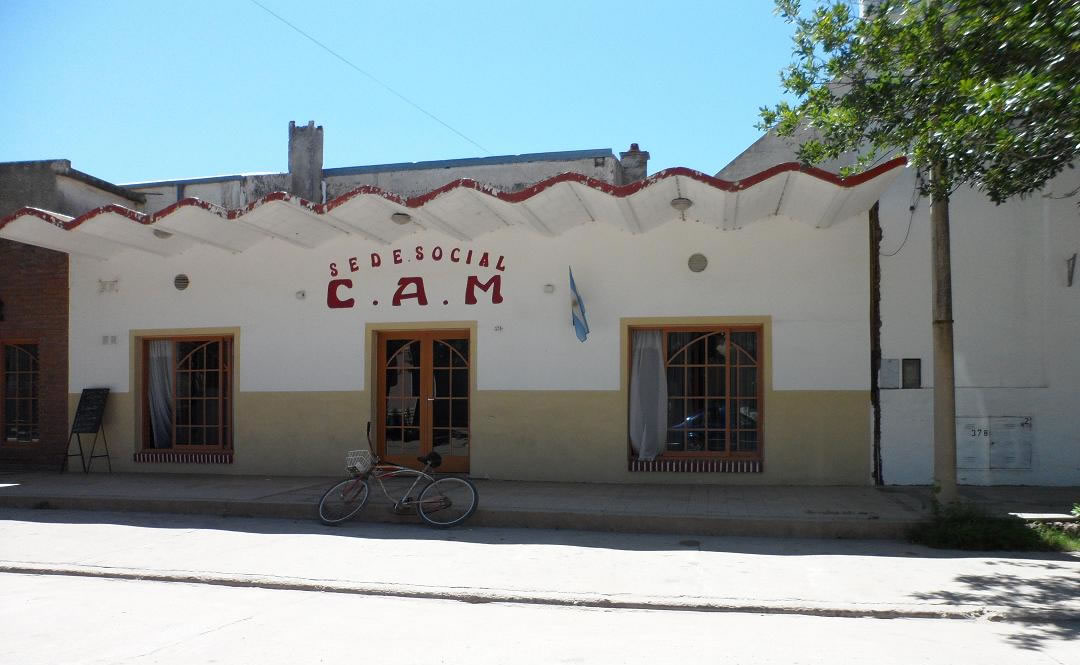

- Location within Córdoba Province Location within Argentina
- Coordinates: 31°42′50″S 63°30′40″W
- Country: Argentina
- Province: Córdoba
- Department: Río Segundo

Government
  - Intendant: Franco Cingolani
- Elevation: 250 m (820 ft)

Population (2010)
  - Total: 972
- Time zone: UTC-3 (ART)
- Postal code: X5975

Matorrales is a town located in the Río Segundo Department, Córdoba Province, Argentina. It is located along the Provincial Route 10, about 98 kilometers southeast of the provincial capital Córdoba, at an average elevation of 250 meters above the sea level. As of the year 2010, it had a total population of 972.

== Climate ==
Matorrales has a Humid Subtropical Climate (Cfa) under Köppen Climate Classification. It sees the most rainfall in January, with 132 mm of average precipitation; and the least rainfall in July, with 18 mm of average precipitation.

Climate data for Matorrales
Month	Jan	Feb	Mar	Apr	May	Jun	Jul	Aug	Sep	Oct	Nov	Dec	Year
Mean daily maximum °C (°F)	30.1 (86.2)	28.4 (83.1)	26.0 (78.8)	22.8 (73.0)	18.7 (65.7)	16.4 (61.5)	15.9 (60.6)	18.7 (65.7)	21.7 (71.1)	24.5 (76.1)	27.4 (81.3)	29.4 (84.9)	23.3 (74.0)
Daily mean °C (°F)	25.0 (77.0)	23.6 (74.5)	21.4 (70.5)	18.3 (64.9)	14.4 (57.9)	11.6 (52.9)	10.8 (51.4)	12.9 (55.2)	15.8 (60.4)	18.9 (66.0)	21.9 (71.4)	24.0 (75.2)	18.2 (64.8)
Mean daily minimum °C (°F)	20.4 (68.7)	19.4 (66.9)	17.5 (63.5)	14.7 (58.5)	11.1 (52.0)	7.9 (46.2)	7.0 (44.6)	8.4 (47.1)	10.8 (51.4)	14.1 (57.4)	16.9 (62.4)	19.2 (66.6)	14.0 (57.1)
Average rainfall mm (inches)	132 (5.2)	115 (4.5)	113 (4.4)	81 (3.2)	41 (1.6)	21 (0.8)	18 (0.7)	25 (1.0)	39 (1.5)	95 (3.7)	112 (4.4)	129 (5.1)	921 (36.1)
Source: Climate-Data.org
