= Oncativo =

- City
- Location of Oncativo in Argentina
- Coordinates: 31°55′S 63°40′W
- Country: Argentina
- Province: Córdoba
- Department: Río Segundo

Government
  - Intendant: Nicolás Ariel Filoni
- Elevation: 287 m (942 ft)

Population (2010 census)
  - Total: 13,180
- Time zone: UTC−3 (ART)
- CPA base: X5986
- Dialing code: +54 3572

Oncativo is a city in the province of Córdoba, Argentina. It has 13,180 inhabitants as per the 2010 census [INDEC]. It is located near the center of the province, 76 km south-southeast from the provincial capital Córdoba City and 64 north-northwest from Villa María, by National Route 9.

Although the town had no official foundation, it is considered that it began with the arrival of the railway line and especially with the opening for public use of the train station of the Ferrocarril Central Argentino, 1 September 1869.

The area of the present-day city was the stage of the Battle of Oncativo, between the forces of generals Juan Facundo Quiroga and José María Paz, in 1830.
