= Deportivo Armenio =

Argentine association football club

- Full name: Club Deportivo Armenio
- Nickname: Tricolor ("Three-coloured")
- Founded: 2 November 1962; 63 years ago
- Ground: Estadio República de Armenia, Ingeniero Maschwitz, Greater Buenos Aires
- Capacity: 10,500
- Chairman: Luciano Nakis
- Manager: Cristian Grabinski
- League: Primera B
- 2022: 2° (Aggregate table)
- Website: deportivoarmen.io
Home colours	Away colours	Third colours

Club Deportivo Armenio is a football club from Ingeniero Maschwitz, Greater Buenos Aires, Argentina. The team currently plays in the Primera B Metropolitana, which is the regionalised third division of the Argentine football league system.

== History ==
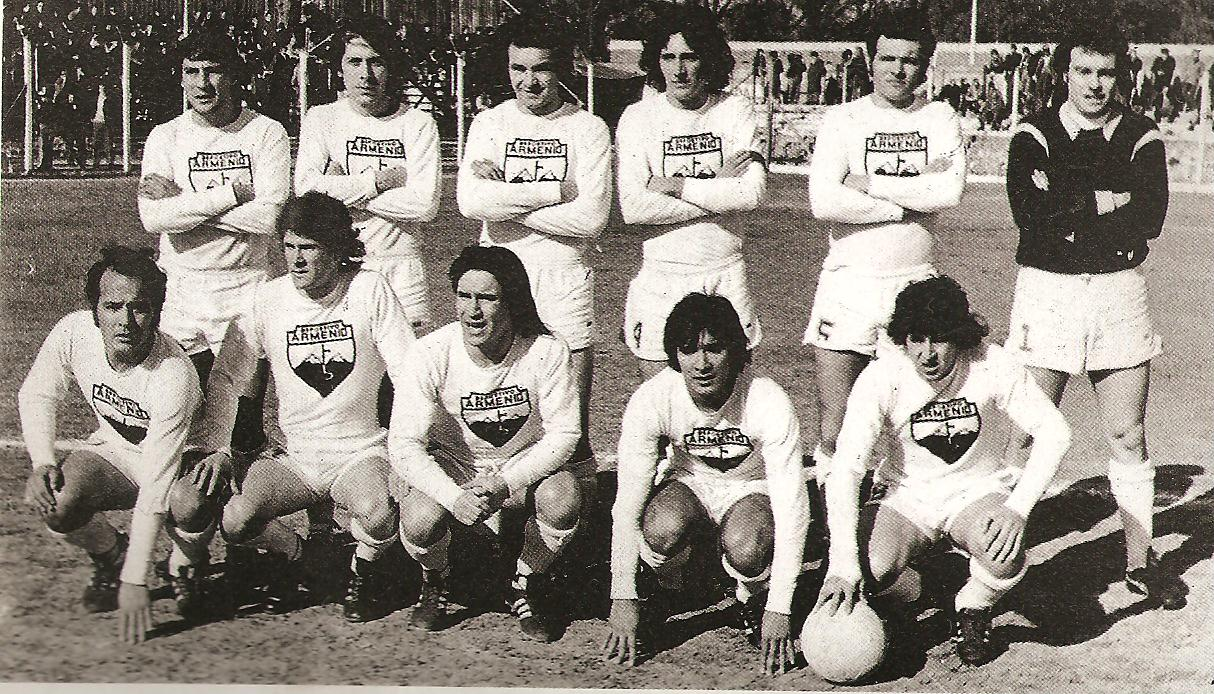
The 1976 team that won the Primera C title

The club was founded in 1962 under the name Club Armenio de Fútbol by the Armenian community in Argentina. It changed its name in 1968, and was affiliated to the Argentine Football Association two years later. The original colours were black and white, but first changed to green and white stripes and then again to red and white. Nowadays, home uniform is red, orange and blue, inspired by the flag of Armenia.

The first official title won by Armenio was the 1972 Primera D championship, therefore promoting to the upper division, Primera C. Only four years later, the squad won another championship and promoted to Primera B.

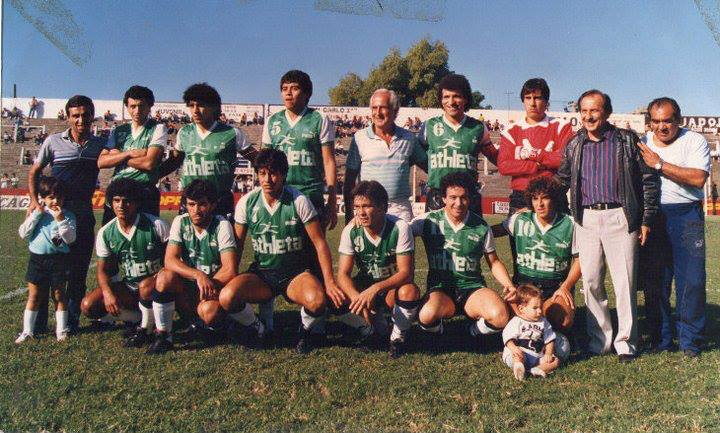
Team that won the first Primera B Nacional championship in 1987

In the 1986–87 season of the Primera B Nacional (second division), Deportivo Armenio broke the division's record of most matches without losing, with a run of 38 games without defeat. The team's coach at that time was Alberto Parseghian (former goalkeeper of the team and of other Argentine clubs), and the captain was Miguel Gardarian. Following this successful run, the club gained promotion to the Primera División (first division). Their highest ever finish in the top division was 13th in the 1987–88 season, followed by relegation the season after (the 1988–89).

A notable game in the club's history was a 3–2 away win against River Plate in the 1987–88 season, after being 0–2 down. On that day, the 3 goals were scored by Raúl Wensel. Another important victory was in the same season against Boca Juniors, in La Bombonera. Armenio won that day 1–0 with a goal scored by Silvano Maciel. This match was the last one in Hugo Gatti's (Boca's goalkeeper) career, as the team's coach (José Omar Pastoriza) took him out of the starting lineup for his mistake in Maciel's goal.

== 2023 squad ==
Note: Flags indicate national team as defined under FIFA eligibility rules; some limited exceptions apply. Players may hold more than one non-FIFA nationality.

No.	Pos.	Nation	Player
—	GK	ARG	Iván López
—	GK	ARG	Carlos Marques
—	GK	ARG	Nahuel Nistal
—	DF	ARG	Nicolás Giménez
—	DF	ARG	Gonzalo Errecalde
—	DF	ARG	Cristian Ordoñez
—	DF	ARG	Germán Aguirre
—	DF	ARG	Ian Pérez
—	DF	ARG	Brian Acosta
—	DF	ARG	Fabricio López
—	DF	ESP	Matias Jeremias Ayala
—	DF	ARG	Cristian Rodríguez
—	DF	ARG	Cristian Gómez
—	DF	ARG	Tiago Clot
—	DF	ARG	Lucas Bossio
—	DF	ARG	Tomás Balduzzi
—	MF	ARG	Lautaro Montani
—	MF	ARG	Franco Almanza

No.	Pos.	Nation	Player
—	MF	ARG	Carlos Battigelli
—	MF	ARG	Marcelo Mosegui
—	MF	ARG	Jonathan Guenzani
—	MF	ARG	Román Ugarriza
—	MF	ARG	Nicolás Sánchez
—	MF	ARG	Luciano Lazarte
—	FW	ARG	Luciano Villalba
—	FW	ARG	Santiago Patroni
—	FW	ARG	Tomás Jerez
—	FW	ARG	Tomás Dopazo
—	FW	ARG	Jonathan Herrera
—	FW	ARG	Alejo Bottan
—	FW	ARG	Lucas Lezcano
—	FW	ARG	Tiziano Suanez
—	FW	ARG	Tobías Gennaro
—	FW	ARG	Alejandro Vignati
—	FW	ARG	Gonzalo Lazzarotto

== Honours ==
=== National ===
- Primera B Nacional
  - Winners (1): 1986–87
- Primera División C
  - Winners (1): 1976
- Primera de Aficionados
  - Winners (1): 1972
