= Villa del Rosario, Córdoba =

Villa del Rosario
- City
- Location of Villa del Rosario in Argentina
- Coordinates: 31°35′S 63°32′W
- Country: Argentina
- Province: Córdoba
- Department: Río Segundo

Government
  - Intendant: Diego Carballo (UCR)
- Elevation: 243 m (797 ft)

Population
  - Total: 13,741
- Time zone: UTC−3 (ART)
- CPA base: X5963
- Dialing code: +54 3573

Villa del Rosario is a city in the center of the province of Córdoba, Argentina. It has 13,741 inhabitants as per the 2001 census [INDEC], and is the head town of the Río Segundo Department. It is located 80 km east-southeast from the provincial capital Córdoba, on the right-hand (southern) banks of the Segundo River (also known as Xanaes). On December 2, 2013, much of the city was destroyed in a powerful tornado.
