= Estadio 12 de Octubre =

Football stadium in Ensenada, Argentina

Coordinates: 34.862733°S 57.916857°W

- Interactive map of Estadio 12 de Octubre
- Location: Ensenada, Greater Buenos Aires
- Capacity: 8200

Tenant
- Defensores de Cambaceres

Estadio 12 de Octubre is a stadium in Ensenada, Greater Buenos Aires. It is used for football matches and is the home stadium of Defensores de Cambaceres.
