= Pilar, Córdoba =

Pilar
- City
- Location of Pilar in Argentina
- Coordinates: 31°41′0″S 63°54′0″W
- Country: Argentina
- Province: Córdoba
- Department: Río Segundo

Government
  - Intendant: Leopoldo Grumstrup (UCR)

Area
  - Total: 98 km^{2} (38 sq mi)
- Elevation: 330 m (1,080 ft)

Population (2010)
  - Total: 14,735
  - Density: 150/km^{2} (390/sq mi)
- Time zone: UTC−3 (ART)
- CPA base: X5972
- Dialing code: +54 3572

Pilar is a city in Córdoba, Argentina, in the Río Segundo Department.

== Climate ==
Climate data for Pilar, Córdoba Province (1991–2020, extremes 1961–present)
Month	Jan	Feb	Mar	Apr	May	Jun	Jul	Aug	Sep	Oct	Nov	Dec	Year
Record high °C (°F)	41.0 (105.8)	40.2 (104.4)	39.6 (103.3)	36.5 (97.7)	36.4 (97.5)	31.1 (88.0)	33.7 (92.7)	39.0 (102.2)	40.3 (104.5)	41.8 (107.2)	41.0 (105.8)	42.6 (108.7)	42.6 (108.7)
Mean daily maximum °C (°F)	30.1 (86.2)	28.3 (82.9)	27.0 (80.6)	24.0 (75.2)	20.2 (68.4)	17.6 (63.7)	17.1 (62.8)	20.2 (68.4)	22.6 (72.7)	25.1 (77.2)	28.0 (82.4)	30.0 (86.0)	24.2 (75.6)
Daily mean °C (°F)	23.7 (74.7)	22.1 (71.8)	20.6 (69.1)	17.3 (63.1)	13.7 (56.7)	10.6 (51.1)	9.6 (49.3)	12.0 (53.6)	14.9 (58.8)	18.2 (64.8)	21.1 (70.0)	23.3 (73.9)	17.3 (63.1)
Mean daily minimum °C (°F)	18.0 (64.4)	17.0 (62.6)	15.5 (59.9)	12.3 (54.1)	8.9 (48.0)	5.3 (41.5)	4.2 (39.6)	5.7 (42.3)	8.4 (47.1)	12.1 (53.8)	14.8 (58.6)	17.1 (62.8)	11.6 (52.9)
Record low °C (°F)	7.7 (45.9)	6.0 (42.8)	0.7 (33.3)	−1.4 (29.5)	−4.8 (23.4)	−9.0 (15.8)	−7.3 (18.9)	−7.3 (18.9)	−4.9 (23.2)	−0.7 (30.7)	3.1 (37.6)	6.3 (43.3)	−9.0 (15.8)
Average precipitation mm (inches)	112.5 (4.43)	112.1 (4.41)	97.5 (3.84)	64.9 (2.56)	23.9 (0.94)	7.0 (0.28)	6.1 (0.24)	8.1 (0.32)	28.1 (1.11)	76.3 (3.00)	98.9 (3.89)	118.4 (4.66)	753.8 (29.68)
Average precipitation days (≥ 0.1 mm)	9.7	9.3	8.4	7.2	4.8	2.9	2.3	2.0	4.4	7.6	10.1	10.6	79.4
Average snowy days	0.0	0.0	0.0	0.0	0.1	0.0	0.1	0.1	0.0	0.0	0.0	0.0	0.2
Average relative humidity (%)	69.7	75.5	76.5	74.8	76.0	73.1	67.2	59.5	57.9	62.7	62.1	63.7	68.2
Mean monthly sunshine hours	285.2	231.7	232.5	192.0	176.7	171.0	192.2	223.2	222.0	238.7	267.0	275.9	2,708.1
Mean daily sunshine hours	9.2	8.2	7.5	6.4	5.7	5.7	6.2	7.2	7.4	7.7	8.9	8.9	7.4
Percentage possible sunshine	64	65	59	59	58	55	58	63	63	62	65	61	61
Average ultraviolet index	14	12	9	6	4	3	3	4	6	9	12	13	8
Source 1: Servicio Meteorológico Nacional (UV 1995-2003; 2012-2019)
Source 2: NOAA (percent sun 1961–1990)
