= Rosario-Córdoba Highway =

Highway in Argentina

Coordinates: 31°46′09.55″S 63°45′32.92″W

The Rosario–Córdoba Highway is a highway in the central region of Argentina, which links the third- and second-largest cities in the country. The route was inaugurated on December 22, 2010. It has total length of 410 km (255 mi) and an estimated cost of 1.6 billion USD.
