= Germán Martellotto =

Argentine association footballer

Germán Ricardo Martellotto (born 16 November 1962) is an Argentine former footballer who last played as a midfielder for Deportivo Español.

== Early life ==
Martellotto was born in 1962 in Calchín, Argentina.

== Club career ==
Martellotto was nicknamed "Tato". In 1989, he signed for Mexican side Monterrey, where he was regarded as a fan favorite. After that, he signed for Mexican side América, where he was regarded as an important midfielder for the club.

== International career ==
In 1991, Martellotto played for the Argentina national football team.

== Style of play ==
Martellotto mainly operated as a midfielder and was known for his creativity.

== Post-playing career ==
After retiring from professional football, Martellotto worked as a manager.
