= Biyik =

Biyik is a surname. Notable people with this surname include

- André Kana-Biyik (born 1965), former Cameroonian footballer
- Enzo Kana-Biyik (born 2007), French professional footballer
- François Omam-Biyik (born 1966), Cameroonian footballer manager
- Jean-Armel Kana-Biyik (born 1989), professional footballer
- Oğuzhan Bıyık (born 1986), Turkish footballer
