= Diego León =

Diego León may refer to:

- Diego León (footballer, born 1984), Spanish footballer
- Diego León (footballer, born 2007), Paraguayan footballer
- Diego León Montoya Sánchez, Colombian crime boss

== See also ==
- Diego de León (disambiguation)
