= Manchester United F.C. Under-21s and Academy =

Youth team of Manchester United Football club

Manchester United F.C. Under-21s
- Full name: Manchester United Football Club Under-21s
- Nickname: The Young Red Devils
- Founded: 1878; 148 years ago as Newton Heath Reserves
- Ground: Leigh Sports Village
- Capacity: 12,000
- Co-chairmen: Joel and Avram Glazer
- Head coach: Adam Lawrence
- League: Premier League 2
- 2025–26: Premier League 2, 2nd (league); Finalists (playoffs)
- Website: www.manutd.com/en/academy
| Home colours | Away colours | Third colours |

Manchester United Football Club Under-21s is the most senior of Manchester United's youth teams and the club's former reserve team. They play in the Premier League 2, the highest tier of the Professional Development League. The team is effectively Manchester United's second-string side, but is limited to five outfield players and one goalkeeper over the age of 21 per game following the introduction of new regulations from the 2022–23 season, a change from three outfield players over age 23 introduced in 2016–17. The age limit previously was again 21, from 2012–13. The team's current manager is Adam Lawrence, who took over from Travis Binnion in 2026.

They were champions of the former Premier Reserve League five times (in 2002, 2005, 2006, 2010 and 2012) between its introduction in 1999 and its dissolution in 2012. The team also won the 2012–13 Professional U21 Development League 1 in its inaugural season, and again in 2015 and 2016. The team also participates in the regional Manchester Senior Cup and the Lancashire Senior Cup. From the 2019–20 edition, they also participate in the nationwide EFL Trophy along with senior teams from levels 3 and 4 of the English football league system, as teams from levels 1 and 2 are restricted to players aged 21 and under.

From November 2008 to August 2013, the team played its home matches at Moss Lane in Altrincham, the home of Altrincham For the 2013–14 Under-21 Premier League season, the team has played the majority of its home matches at Salford City Stadium in Barton-upon-Irwell. Since 2014–15, the team play its home matches at Leigh Sports Village. Rules set out by the Premier League state that at least three home league games per season must be played at the club's main stadium, Old Trafford. In previous seasons, the team has played at the Victoria Stadium, the home of Northwich Victoria, and Ewen Fields, the home of Hyde United.

Manchester United also has an Under-18s team that plays in the Premier League Under-18s Group 2 and the FA Youth Cup. The under-18s play their home games at the club's Trafford Training Centre in Carrington.

== Under-21s ==
The first record of any matches played by the Manchester United reserve team dates back to 6 October 1883, when the club was still known as Newton Heath LYR F.C., a 4–1 defeat away to Pendleton Olympic Reserves. They predominantly played friendlies for their first nine seasons, although they entered the first four seasons of the Lancashire Junior Cup, starting in 1885–86; they won just one of their five matches played in the competition over those four years, beating Churchtown in October 1887, before losing to Park Lane Wanderers in the next round. In 1892–93, they entered league football for the first time, taking part in the second season of the Lancashire Combination; they finished third, only missing out on second place by virtue of an inferior goal average. That final position was only matched by a further third-place finish in 1895–96, and another in 1905–06.

In 1911, the club became founder members of the Central League, winning their first league title in its second season in 1912–13. They played in the Central League until 1999, when the competition was superseded by the Premier Reserve League, winning the title nine times, the second most of any club in the league's history. The Premier Reserve League was split into northern and southern divisions, but it was not until 2005 that a play-off was introduced to determine an overall champion. Manchester United won the northern title in 2002, 2005, 2006, 2010 and 2012, winning the overall title in each of the last four. The reserve team was dissolved in 2012 and replaced by an under-21 side that played in the newly founded Premier League 2. They won three of the first four PL2 titles, only missing out in 2013–14. The age restrictions were changed to under-23s in 2016, before being reverted to under-21s in 2022.

A Manchester United team competed in the Lancashire Senior Cup from the 1889–90 season, initially entering the first team but by the 1950–51 season they had started entering a reserve team only. Including first-team victories, Manchester United have won the Lancashire Senior Cup 15 times (including a shared title with Liverpool in 1920), most recently as of their last entry in the competition in 2012–13. They also entered the reserves in the Manchester Senior Cup every year from 1999–2000 until the competition was abandoned in 2016, winning 12 titles.

As of the 2025–26 season, the Manchester United Under-21s compete in Premier League 2 (since 2012), the EFL Trophy (since 2019), the National League Cup (since 2024) and the Premier League International Cup (since 2016).

=== Current squad ===
As of 30 September 2026

Note: Flags indicate national team as defined under FIFA eligibility rules; some limited exceptions apply. Players may hold more than one non-FIFA nationality.

| No. | Pos. | Nation | Player |
|---|---|---|---|
| 27 | FW | ENG | Tynan Thompson |
| 35 | DF | PAR | Diego León |
| 46 | DF | ENG | Yuel Helafu |
| 47 | GK | WAL | Kit Margetson |
| 48 | MF | IRL | Jack Moorhouse |
| 49 | FW | ENG | Ashton Missin |
| 51 | MF | ENG | Jim Thwaites |
| 53 | FW | ENG | Victor Musa |
| 54 | FW | FRA | Enzo Kana-Biyik |
| 55 | DF | WAL | Reece Munro |
| 56 | DF | ENG | Jaydan Kamason |
| 57 | DF | SCO | Dan Armer |
| 58 | MF | COL | Cristian Orozco |

| No. | Pos. | Nation | Player |
|---|---|---|---|
| 59 | DF | JAM | Dante Plunkett |
| 60 | MF | ENG | David Eze |
| 61 | FW | ENG | Isaac Konde |
| 62 | FW | ENG | Bendito Mantato |
| 65 | DF | ENG | Godwill Kukonki |
| 66 | DF | ENG | Albert Mills |
| 68 | GK | ENG | Cameron Byrne-Hughes |
| 69 | GK | ENG | Fred Heath |
| 77 | FW | ENG | JJ Gabriel |
| 88 | MF | RUS | Amir Ibragimov |
| 93 | FW | SVK | Samuel Lusale |
| 98 | MF | ENG | Karim Cassim |

==== Out on loan ====
Note: Flags indicate national team as defined under FIFA eligibility rules; some limited exceptions apply. Players may hold more than one non-FIFA nationality.

| No. | Pos. | Nation | Player |
|---|---|---|---|
| 32 | FW | DEN | Chido Obi (at Willem II until 30 June 2027) |
| 34 | GK | ENG | Elyh Harrison (at Greenock Morton until 30 June 2027) |
| 36 | FW | ENG | Ethan Wheatley (at Lincoln City until 30 June 2027) |
| 40 | GK | ENG | Solomon Honor (at Southport until 30 June 2027) |
| 42 | MF | MLI | Sékou Koné (at Lausanne-Sport until 30 June 2027) |
| 44 | MF | ENG | Dan Gore (at Luton Town until 30 June 2027) |
| 48 | MF | ENG | Finley McAllister (at Radcliffe until 8 October 2026) |
| 52 | GK | NIR | William Murdock (at Hednesford Town until 5 January 2027) |
| — | MF | ENG | Jayce Fitzgerald (at Rotherham United until 30 June 2027) |
| — | MF | IRL | Jacob Devaney (at Hibernian until 30 June 2027) |

=== Managerial history ===
| Years | Name |
|---|---|
| 1946–1964 | (Wales) Jimmy Murphy |
| 1964–1969 | (England) Wilf McGuinness |
| 1969–1970 | (England) John Aston Sr. |
| 1970–1971 | (England) Wilf McGuinness |
| 1971–1974 | (England) Bill Foulkes |
| 1974–1981 | (England) Jack Crompton |
| 1981–1991 | (England) Brian Whitehouse |
| 1991–2000 | (England) Pop Robson (Scotland) Jimmy Ryan |
| 2000–2001 | (England) Mike Phelan |
| 2001–2002 | (Scotland) Brian McClair |
| 2002 | (England) Mike Phelan |
| 2002–2005 | (Scotland) Ricky Sbragia |
| 2005–2006 | (Scotland) Brian McClair |
| 2005–2006 | (Netherlands) René Meulensteen |
| 2006–2008 | (Scotland) Brian McClair |
| 2008–2011 | (Norway) Ole Gunnar Solskjær (England) Warren Joyce |
| 2011–2016 | (England) Warren Joyce |
| 2016–2017 | (England) Nicky Butt |
| 2017–2019 | (Scotland) Ricky Sbragia |
| 2019–2022 | (England) Neil Wood |
| 2022–2023 | (England) Mark Dempsey |
| 2023–2026 | (Republic of Ireland) Travis Binnion |
| 2026– | (England) Adam Lawrence |

=== Honours ===
- Premier League 2: 3
  - 2012–13, 2014–15, 2015–16
- Premier Reserve League
  - Play-off Final Winners: (4) 2005, 2006, 2010, 2012
  - Northern Champions: (5) 2002, 2005, 2006, 2010, 2012
- Central League: 9
  - 1912–13, 1920–21, 1938–39, 1946–47, 1955–56, 1959–60, 1993–94, 1995–96, 1996–97
- Central League Division 1 West: 1
  - 2005
- Central League Cup: 1
  - 2005
- Manchester Senior Cup: 10
  - 1999, 2000, 2004, 2006, 2008, 2009, 2011, 2012, 2013, 2014
- Lancashire Senior Cup: 15
  - 1898, 1913, 1914, 1920 (shared), 1929, 1938, 1941, 1943, 1946, 1951, 1969, 2008, 2009, 2012, 2013
- SuperCupNI: 1
  - 2017

== Under-18s ==
Manchester United F.C. Under-18s
- Full name: Manchester United Football Club Under-18s
- Nickname: The Young Red Devils
- Founded: 1998; 28 years ago
- Ground: Trafford Training Centre; Carrington
- Co-chairmen: Joel and Avram Glazer
- Head coach: Darren Fletcher
- League: U18 Premier League North
- 2025–26: U18 Premier League, 2nd (North section)
| Home colours | Away colours | Third colours |

The Manchester United Academy was established in 1998, following the reorganisation of youth football in England, but has roots stretching all the way back to the 1930s with the establishment of the Manchester United Junior Athletic Club (MUJAC), and has been responsible for producing some of Manchester United's greatest ever players, including the club's top five all-time appearance makers, Ryan Giggs, Bobby Charlton, Bill Foulkes, Paul Scholes and Gary Neville, and the new wave of home-grown talents known as Fergie's Fledglings. The current academy is based at the club's Trafford Training Centre, an 85-acre (340,000 m^{2}) site in the Manchester suburb of Carrington.

The Manchester United youth team is statistically the most successful in English football, with nine players in the English football Hall of Fame (Duncan Edwards, Bobby Charlton, George Best, Nobby Stiles, Mark Hughes, Paul Scholes, David Beckham and Johnny Giles). Manchester United also have the best FA Youth Cup record, winning on ten occasions out of 14 final appearances.

The academy comprises age-group teams ranging from Under-9s up to the flagship Under-18s, who currently compete in Group C of the Premier Academy League and in the FA Youth Cup. The Under-16s and Under-18s typically play their academy league games at 11am on Saturday mornings at Carrington, while Youth Cup games are generally played at either Altrincham's Moss Lane ground (where the under-23s play their home games) or the club's 76,000-capacity Old Trafford home, in order to cater for the greater number of supporters these fixtures attract.

In 2007, Manchester United Under-18s won the Champions Youth Cup, intended to be an analogue to the FIFA Club World Cup for youth sides, beating Juventus 1–0 in the final in Malaysia. It was their first and only title, since the tournament was scrapped after only one edition.

=== Current squad ===
As of 27 September 2026

| Nat. | Player | Date of birth | Position | Number | International caps | Previous club | Joined |
2nd Year Scholars
| (England) | Charlie Hardy | 14 July 2009 (age 17) | GK | 67 | | Derby County | 6 December 2025 |
| (England) | Zachary Watson | 19 September 2008 (age 18) | GK | 78 | | | July 2025 |
| (England) | Jacob Watson | 16 May 2009 (age 17) | DF | 71 | | | July 2025 |
| (Australia) | Jariyah Shah | 25 May 2009 (age 17) | MF | 72 | Capped at Under-17 level | | July 2025 |
| (England) | Jayden Ngwashi | 21 September 2008 (age 18) | DF | 73 | | | July 2025 |
| (Republic of Ireland) | Rafe McCormack | 14 December 2008 (age 17) | DF | 75 | Capped at Under-19 level | | July 2025 |
| (Republic of Ireland) | Jay McEvoy | 16 October 2008 (age 18) | MF | 74 | Capped at Under-15 level | | July 2025 |
| (England) | Nathaniel-Junior Brown | 18 December 2008 (age 17) | MF | 76 | | | July 2025 |
| (Germany) | Noah Ajayi | 23 November 2008 (age 17) | FW | 70 | | | July 2025 |
| (Portugal) | Neithan Barbosa | 6 December 2008 (age 17) | FW | 94 | | | July 2025 |
1st Year Scholars
| (England) | Jake Ford | 28 October 2009 (age 17) | GK | 84 | | | July 2026 |
| (England) | Idris Fabiyi | 24 February 2010 (age 16) | DF | 82 | | | July 2026 |
| (England) | Connor Laurie | 9 October 2009 (age 17) | DF | 85 | | | July 2026 |
| (England) | Sam O'Brien | 5 January 2010 (age 16) | DF | 87 | | | July 2026 |
| (Russia) | Gazi Ibragimov | 16 October 2009 (age 17) | DF | 90 | | | July 2026 |
| (England) | Harley Emsden-James | 28 September 2009 (age 17) | DF | 91 | | Southampton | July 1, 2025 |
| (Spain) | Jaume Camacho | 5 October 2009 (age 17) | MF | 64 | | | July 2026 |
| (Portugal) | Edson DeJonge-Seiros | 18 October 2009 (age 17) | MF | 79 | | | July 2026 |
| (England) | Emmanuel Ziro | 4 January 2010 (age 16) | MF | 81 | | | July 2026 |
| (England) | Jacey Carrick | 30 April 2010 (age 16) | MF | 83 | | | July 2026 |
| (Scotland) | Harlem McLaughlin | 30 October 2009 (age 17) | MF | 86 | | | July 2026 |
| (England) | Pharell Silvester | 28 July 2010 (age 16) | MF | 89 | | | July 2026 |
| (England) | Jodie Nganga | 14 September 2009 (age 17) | MF | 92 | | | July 2026 |
| (Scotland) | Camron Mpofu | 10 September 2009 (age 17) | FW | 80 | | | July 2026 |
| (England) | Kai Rooney | 2 November 2009 (age 17) | FW | 99 | | | July 2026 |
Under-16s
| (England) | Bassirou Nkoto | 27 September 2010 (age 16) | MF | | | | |
| (England) | Douka Nkoto | 27 September 2010 (age 16) | FW | | | | |

=== Honours ===
Under–18 Team

- U18 Premier League
  - National Final Winners (1): 2023–24
  - North Division Champions (2): 2017–18, 2023–24
- FA Youth Cup: 11
  - 1953, 1954, 1955, 1956, 1957, 1964, 1992, 1995, 2003, 2011, 2022
- U18 Premier League Cup: 1
  - 2023–24
- Blue Stars/FIFA Youth Cup: 18
  - 1954, 1957, 1959, 1960, 1961, 1962, 1965, 1966, 1968, 1969, 1975, 1976, 1978, 1979, 1981, 1982, 2004, 2005
- Champions Youth Cup: 1
  - 2007
- Lancashire League Division One: 12
  - 1954–55, 1983–84, 1984–85, 1986–87, 1987–88, 1989–90, 1990–91, 1992–93, 1994–95, 1995–96, 1996–97, 1997–98
- Lancashire League Division Two: 5
  - 1964–65, 1969–70, 1971–72, 1988–89, 1996–97
- Lancashire League Division One Supplementary Cup: 4
  - 1954–55, 1955–56, 1959–60, 1963–64
- Lancashire League Division Two Supplementary Cup: 10
  - 1955–56, 1956–57, 1959–60, 1961–62, 1963–64, 1964–65, 1965–66, 1969–70, 1971–72, 1976–77

Doubles and Trebles

- Trebles
  - U18 Premier League, U18 Premier League North, U18 Premier League Cup(1): 2023–24

Under–16 Team

- U16 Premier League Shield: 2
  - 2024–25, 2025–26
- SuperCupNI: 8
  - 1991, 2003, 2008, 2009, 2013, 2014, 2022, 2026

Under–15 Team

- U15 Premier League Super Cup: 1
  - 2024–25
- U15 Premier League Cup North: 1
  - 2024–25

== Staff ==
| Role | Name |
|---|---|
| Director of Academy | (England) Steve Torpey |
| Head of Academy Football Operations | (England) Steve Higham |
| Head of Academy Football Development and Methodology | (England) Darren Hughes |
| Assistant Head of Academy Football Development and Methodology | (England) Gareth Morgan |
| Head of Academy Recruitment | (England) Connor Hunter |
| Head of Player Development and Coaching (U17–U21) | (Scotland) Darren Fletcher |
| Under-21 Head Coach | (England) Adam Lawrence |
| Under-21 Assistant Head Coach | (England) Alan Wright |
| Lead Academy Goalkeeping Coach (U21) | Tommy Lee |
| Academy Goalkeeping Coach | Christopher Backhouse |
| Under-21 Performance Analyst | Curtis Quinn |
| Under-18 Head Coach | (Scotland) Darren Fletcher |
| Under-18 Assistant Head Coach | (England) Colin Little |
| Senior Academy Coach | (England) Mark Dempsey |
| Academy Goalkeeping Coach (U18) | Kevin Wolfe |
| Head of Academy Performance | Matt Walker |
| PDP Athletic Development Coach | (England) Luke Lawrence |
| Head of Player Development (U13-16) and Under-16 Lead Coach | Tom Curtis |
| Under-15 Lead Coach | (England) Tommy Rowe |
| Head of Player Development (U9-U13) | Eamon Mulvey |
| Under-14 Lead Coach | Vacant |
| Under-12 Lead Coach | (England) Lee Unsworth |
| YDP Athletic Development Lead (U12–U16) | Alex Ouzounoglou |

== Notable youth team players ==
The following is a list of players who have played in the Manchester United youth team (U16–U21) and represented a country (not necessarily their country of birth) at full international level. Players who are currently playing at Manchester United, or for another club on loan from Manchester United, are highlighted in bold.

- (Australia) Stan Ackerley
- (Pakistan) Adnan Ahmed
- (Scotland) Arthur Albiston
- (Ivory Coast) **Amad Diallo**
- (England) John Aston Sr.
- (Australia) Ray Baartz
- (Scotland) Phil Bardsley
- (Cape Verde) Bebé
- (England) David Beckham
- (Montserrat) Mylan Benjamin
- (Jamaica) Di'Shon Bernard
- (Northern Ireland) George Best
- (Wales) Clayton Blackmore
- (Northern Ireland) Jackie Blanchflower
- (Australia) Mark Bosnich
- (Republic of Ireland) Robbie Brady
- (Angola) Evandro Brandão
- (Saint Kitts and Nevis) Febian Brandy
- (Republic of Ireland) Shay Brennan
- (Chile) Ben Brereton Díaz
- (Northern Ireland) Ronnie Briggs
- (England) Wes Brown
- (Northern Ireland) (Republic of Ireland) Alex Bruce
- (Montserrat) DJ Buffonge
- (Scotland) Francis Burns
- (England) Nicky Butt
- (England) Roger Byrne
- (England) Fraizer Campbell
- (Republic of Ireland) (Ireland) Johnny Carey
- (Republic of Ireland) Joe Carolan
- (Northern Ireland) Craig Cathcart
- (England) Bobby Charlton
- (Wales) James Chester
- (Curaçao) Tahith Chong
- (England) Tom Cleverley
- (United States) Kenny Cooper
- (Scotland) Hugh Curran
- (Norway) Mats Møller Dæhli
- (Wales) Alan Davies
- (Wales) Simon Davies
- (Wales) Oliver Denham
- (Belgium) Ritchie De Laet
- (Senegal) Mame Biram Diouf
- (England) Danny Drinkwater
- (Northern Ireland) Joe Dudgeon
- (Republic of Ireland) Jimmy Dunne
- (Republic of Ireland) Eamon Dunphy
- (England) Mike Duxbury
- (England) Duncan Edwards
- (Norway) Magnus Wolff Eikrem
- (Libya) Sadiq El Fitouri
- (Sweden) Anthony Elanga
- (Rwanda) Noam Emeran
- (Northern Ireland) Corry Evans
- (Northern Ireland) Jonny Evans
- (Eritrea) Siem Eyob-Abraha
- (Brazil) Fabio
- (China) Dong Fangzhuo
- (Scotland) Darren Fletcher
- (Scotland) **Tyler Fletcher**
- (England) Bill Foulkes
- (Netherlands) Timothy Fosu-Mensah
- (Northern Ireland) Ethan Galbraith
- (Argentina) Alejandro Garnacho
- (England) James Garner
- (Republic of Ireland) Darron Gibson
- (Wales) Ryan Giggs
- (Republic of Ireland) Johnny Giles
- (Northern Ireland) Keith Gillespie
- (Republic of Ireland) Don Givens
- (Bermuda) Shaun Goater
- (Italy) Pierluigi Gollini
- (England) Angel Gomes
- (The Gambia) Arthur Gómez
- (Northern Ireland) Johnny Gorman
- (Curaçao) Kenji Gorré
- (Northern Ireland) Sean Goss
- (England) Brian Greenhoff
- (England) Mason Greenwood
- (Republic of Ireland) Tommy Hamilton
- (Saint Kitts and Nevis) Raheem Hanley
- (Northern Ireland) David Healy
- (England) **Tom Heaton**
- (England) Dean Henderson
- (Republic of Ireland) Jackie Hennessy
- (Chile) Ángelo Henríquez
- (Costa Rica) Luis Hernández
- (Gibraltar) Danny Higginbotham
- (Wales) Mark Hughes
- (Northern Ireland) Phil Hughes
- (Pakistan) Etzaz Hussain
- (Russia) **Amir Ibragimov**
- (Cyprus) Nikolas Ioannou
- (Iraq) Zidane Iqbal
- (The Gambia) Saidy Janko
- (Belgium) Adnan Januzaj
- (Jamaica) David Johnson
- (England) Sam Johnstone
- (Democratic Republic of the Congo) Willy Kambwala
- (Sierra Leone) Idris Kanu
- (England) Michael Keane
- (Republic of Ireland) Will Keane
- (Pakistan) Otis Khan
- (England) Brian Kidd
- (Norway) Joshua King
- (United States) Jovan Kirovski
- (Czech Republic) Matěj Kovář
- (Wales) Tom Lawrence
- (Paraguay) **Diego León**
- (Wales) Dylan Levitt
- (England) Jesse Lingard
- (Canada) Shaun Lowther
- (Republic of Ireland) Jon Macken
- (England) **Kobbie Mainoo**
- (Togo) Souleymane Mamam
- (Angola) Manucho
- (Scotland) Oli McBurnie
- (Northern Ireland) David McCreery
- (Northern Ireland) Luke McCullough
- (England) Wilf McGuinness
- (Northern Ireland) Sammy McIlroy
- (Republic of Ireland) Alan McLoughlin
- (Northern Ireland) Sammy McMillan
- (Northern Ireland) Paddy McNair
- (Republic of Ireland) Paul McShane
- (Scotland) Scott McTominay
- (Tunisia) Hannibal Mejbri
- (Yemen) D'Mani Mellor
- (Jamaica) Demetri Mitchell
- (Republic of Ireland) Jackie Mooney
- (Mauritius) Kalam Mooniaruck
- (England) Johnny Morris
- (Jamaica) Ravel Morrison
- (Northern Ireland) Philip Mulryne
- (Northern Ireland) Colin Murdock
- (Wales) Daniel Nardiello
- (England) Gary Neville
- (England) Phil Neville
- (Northern Ireland) Jimmy Nicholl
- (Northern Ireland) Jimmy Nicholson
- (Northern Ireland) Oliver Norwood
- (Republic of Ireland) Lee O'Connor
- (Republic of Ireland) Kieran O'Hara
- (Republic of Ireland) John O'Shea
- (Wales) Peter O'Sullivan
- (United States) Matthew Olosunde
- (Australia) James Overy
- (Poland) Maxi Oyedele
- (England) Stan Pearson
- (England) David Pegg
- (Uruguay) Facundo Pellistri
- (Brazil) Andreas Pereira
- (Republic of Ireland) Anthony Pilkington
- (Spain) Gerard Piqué
- (England) David Platt
- (Jamaica) **Dante Plunkett**
- (France) Paul Pogba
- (Romania) Dennis Politic
- (Wales) Regan Poole
- (Brazil) Rafael
- (England) **Marcus Rashford**
- (England) Kieran Richardson
- (England) Jimmy Rimmer
- (Mozambique) Rivaldo Daúde
- (Australia) Alex Robertson
- (Sweden) Jonny Rödlund
- (Italy) Giuseppe Rossi
- (South Africa) Mike Rowbotham
- (England) David Sadler
- (Wales) Charlie Savage
- (Wales) Robbie Savage
- (Gibraltar) James Scanlon
- (Gibraltar) Luca Scanlon
- (England) Paul Scholes
- (Northern Ireland) Jackie Scott
- (England) Ryan Shawcross
- (Malta) Paul Sixsmith
- (Ireland) (Republic of Ireland) Paddy Sloan
- (United States) Jonathan Spector
- (Scotland) Michael Stewart
- (England) Nobby Stiles
- (Slovakia) Martin Šviderský
- (Northern Ireland) Jordan Thompson
- (United States) John Thorrington
- (Serbia) Zoran Tošić
- (Hong Kong) Sean Tse
- (Democratic Republic of the Congo) Axel Tuanzebe
- (Uruguay) Guillermo Varela
- (Albania) Frédéric Veseli
- (England) Dennis Viollet
- (England) Danny Welbeck
- (Republic of Ireland) Billy Whelan
- (Northern Ireland) Norman Whiteside
- (Grenada) Ro-Shaun Williams
- (Montserrat) Matty Willock
- (Republic of Ireland) Marc Wilson
- (Cayman Islands) Jamie Wood
- (Qatar) Hussein Yasser
- (Germany) Ron-Robert Zieler

== Players of the Year ==
Prior to 1990, a single award was presented to the best young player of that season. Between 1982 and 1985, this was the entitled "Young Player of the Year"; the award then became known as the "Denzil Haroun Young Player of the Year" between 1986 and 1989 in honour of Denzil Haroun, a former club director and brother-in-law of former club chairman Louis Edwards.

Since 1990, individual awards are made to the best player of the Academy and the Reserves. The "Young Player of the Year" is named in honour of Jimmy Murphy, Matt Busby's long-time assistant manager, who died in 1989, and the best reserve is awarded the "Denzil Haroun Reserve Player of the Year".

| Season | Supporters Club Young Player of the Year |
|---|---|
| 1982–83 | Norman Whiteside |
| 1983–84 | Mark Hughes |
| 1984–85 | Mark Hughes |

| Season | Denzil Haroun Young Player of the Year |
|---|---|
| 1985–86 | Simon Ratcliffe |
| 1986–87 | Gary Walsh |
| 1987–88 | Lee Martin |
| 1988–89 | Mark Robins |

| Season | Jimmy Murphy Young Player of the Year | Denzil Haroun Reserve Team Player of the Year |
|---|---|---|
| 1989–90 | Lee Martin | Mark Robins |
| 1990–91 | Ryan Giggs | Jason Lydiate |
| 1991–92 | Ryan Giggs | Brian Carey |
| 1992–93 | Paul Scholes | Colin McKee |
| 1993–94 | Phil Neville | Nicky Butt |
| 1994–95 | Terry Cooke | Kevin Pilkington |
| 1995–96 | Ronnie Wallwork | Michael Appleton |
| 1996–97 | John Curtis | Michael Clegg |
| 1997–98 | Wes Brown | Michael Twiss |
| 1998–99 | Wes Brown | Mark Wilson |
| 1999–2000 | Bojan Djordjic | Jonathan Greening |
| 2000–01 | Alan Tate | Michael Stewart |
| 2001–02 | Paul Tierney | John O'Shea |
| 2002–03 | Ben Collett | Darren Fletcher |
| 2003–04 | Jonathan Spector | David Jones |
| 2004–05 | Giuseppe Rossi | Sylvan Ebanks-Blake |
| 2005–06 | Darron Gibson | Giuseppe Rossi |
| 2006–07 | Craig Cathcart | Kieran Lee |
| 2007–08 | Danny Welbeck | Richard Eckersley |
| 2008–09 | Federico Macheda | James Chester |
| 2009–10 | Will Keane | Ritchie De Laet |
| 2010–11 | Ryan Tunnicliffe | Oliver Gill |
| 2011–12 | Mats Møller Dæhli | Michael Keane |
| 2012–13 | Ben Pearson | Adnan Januzaj |
| 2013–14 | James Wilson | Saidy Janko |
| 2014–15 | Axel Tuanzebe | Andreas Pereira |
| 2015–16 | Marcus Rashford | Cameron Borthwick-Jackson |
| 2016–17 | Angel Gomes | Axel Tuanzebe |
| 2017–18 | Tahith Chong | Demetri Mitchell |
| 2018–19 | Mason Greenwood | Tahith Chong |
| 2019–20 | Anthony Elanga | James Garner |
| 2020–21 | Shola Shoretire | Hannibal Mejbri |
| 2021–22 | Alejandro Garnacho | Álvaro Carreras |
| 2022–23 | Kobbie Mainoo | Dan Gore |
| 2023–24 | Ethan Wheatley | Elyh Harrison |
| 2024–25 | Harry Amass | Tyler Fredricson |
| 2025–26 | JJ Gabriel | Tyler Fletcher |
