= Tyler Fredricson =

English footballer (born 2005)

Personal information
- Full name: Tyler Edwin Fredricson
- Date of birth: 23 February 2005 (age 21)
- Place of birth: Manchester, England
- Height: 6 ft 0 in (1.84 m)
- Position: Defender

Team information
- Current team: Lausanne-Sport
- Number: 3

Youth career
- 2018–2025: Manchester United

Senior career*
Years	Team	Apps	(Gls)
2025–2026	Manchester United	3	(0)
2026–	Lausanne-Sport	0	(0)

International career^{‡}
2021–2022	England U17	2	(0)
2022–2023	England U18	2	(0)
- * Club domestic league appearances and goals as of 26 December 2025 ‡ National team caps and goals as of 21 February 2025

Tyler Edwin Fredricson (born 23 February 2005) is an English professional footballer who plays as centre-back for Swiss Super League club Lausanne-Sport.

== Club career ==
=== Manchester United ===
Fredricson grew up in Poynton, Cheshire. He plays at centre-back and played a key role in Manchester United's FA Youth Cup winning team in 2022, although he missed the final through injury and was replaced by Louis Jackson. He signed his first professional contract with the club in May 2022. He was promoted to the Manchester United U21 side in the following season, while also training on occasion with the first team. Erik ten Hag named him on the bench for United's match in the UEFA Europa League against Real Sociedad in September 2022, however he missed many months through injury shortly afterwards, and did not return to action until April 2024.

He was promoted to train with the first team once again in January 2025. He travelled with the Manchester United first-team squad for their Premier League match against Tottenham Hotspur on 16 February 2025, and was named amongst the match-day substitutes.

On 20 April 2025, Fredricson started his first Premier League game for Manchester United, at home to Wolverhampton Wanderers, playing on the left-side of three-man central defence, in a 1–0 home defeat at Old Trafford under manager Ruben Amorim, with fellow-academy graduate Harry Amass also making his first senior home start in the game, Amorim post-match praised the performance of the pair saying they "deserved better" than ending up on the losing side on the day.

In January 2026, it was reported that Fredricson had agreed a transfer to Scottish Premiership club Celtic. The transfer, however, was cancelled after Fredricson suffered an injury.

=== Lausanne-Sport ===
On 30 July 2026, Fredricson joined Swiss Super League club Lausanne-Sport on a three-year deal.

== International career ==
He has been capped by England at under-18 level.

== Career statistics ==
=== Club ===
As of match played 26 December 2025

Appearances and goals by club, season and competition
Club	Season	League			National cup		League cup (Note: Includes EFL Cup)		Europe		Other		Total	
Club	Season	Division	Apps	Goals	Apps	Goals	Apps	Goals	Apps	Goals	Apps	Goals	Apps	Goals
Manchester United U21	2022–23	—			—		—		—		2 (Note: Appearance(s) in EFL Trophy)	0	2	0
Manchester United U21	2023–24	—			—		—		—		—		0	0
Manchester United U21	2024–25	—			—		—		—		2	0	2	0
Manchester United U21	2025–26	—			—		—		—		1	0	1	0
Manchester United U21	Total		0	0	0	0	0	0	0	0	5	0	5	0
Manchester United	2024–25	Premier League	2	0	0	0	0	0	0	0	0	0	2	0
Manchester United	2025–26	Premier League	1	0	0	0	1	0	—		—		2	0
Manchester United	Total		3	0	0	0	1	0	0	0	0	0	4	0
Lausanne-Sport	2026–27	Swiss Super League	0	0	0	0	—		—		—		0	0
Career Total			3	0	0	0	1	0	0	0	5	0	9	0

== Honours ==
Individual

- Denzil Haroun Reserve Team Player of the Year: 2024–25
