= Travis Binnion =

English-born Irish footballer and coach (born 1986)

Personal information
- Date of birth: 10 November 1986 (age 40)
- Place of birth: Derby, England
- Height: 1.78 m (5 ft 10 in)
- Position: Defender

Team information
- Current team: Manchester United (first-team coach)

Youth career
- Sheffield United

Senior career*
Years	Team	Apps	(Gls)
2006–2008	Sheffield United	0	(0)
2008	→ IFK Mariehamn	6	(0)

International career
2007	Republic of Ireland U19	5	(0)

Managerial career
- 2013–2016: Sheffield United U18 (assistant)
- 2016–2019: Sheffield United U21
- 2021–2023: Manchester United U18
- 2023–2026: Manchester United U21
- * Club domestic league appearances and goals

Travis Binnion (born 10 November 1986) is a professional football coach and former player who played as a defender. He was previously a first-team coach for Premier League club Manchester United. Binnion previously served as the head coach of the Manchester United Under-21s. Born in England, he represented the Republic of Ireland at youth level.

Born in Derby, England, he began his career with Sheffield United and played for IFK Mariehamn in the Veikkausliiga. After retiring from playing through injury he was manager of the Sheffield United Academy.

== Football career ==
=== Playing career ===
Coming through the ranks at the Blades Academy, Binnion came back from a career threatening hip injury to break into the reserve team at Bramall Lane during the 2006–07 season. In April 2008 he was signed by IFK Mariehamn in Finland to further progress his career.

=== Coaching career ===
Having failed to find regular first team football Binnion retired from playing and took up a coaching role at his former club, Sheffield United. In June 2016 it was announced he would be taking over as Academy manager from Nick Cox who moved to Manchester United. In 2019, he moved to Manchester United, where he was appointed as the Head of Player Development for the Under 14s-Under 16s phase, before being appointed as the head coach for the Under-18s in 2021.

== Cricket career ==
In 2002, Binnion played a single List A match for the Nottinghamshire Cricket Board against Cumberland in the 1st round of the 2003 Cheltenham & Gloucester Trophy, during which he scored 20 runs and took a single catch.

== Honours ==
Manchester United U18

- FA Youth Cup: 2021–22
