= Football at the Central African Games =

Football at the Central African Games was an event held three times for national football teams from Central Africa. On two occasions, it possibly served as a qualifying tournament for the African Games.

== Results ==
Year	Host	Final			Third Place Match		
Year	Host	Champion	Score	Second Place	Third Place	Score	Fourth Place
1976; Details	Gabon	Cameroon	3 - 2	Congo	Gabon	3 - 1	Central African Republic
1981; Details	Angola	Zaire	League format, thus no final	Congo	Gabon	League format, thus no final	Angola
1987; Details	Congo	Cameroon	2 - 0	Angola	Congo	3 - 2	Gabon

== Most wins ==
Wins	Nation	Year(s)
2 times	Cameroon	1976, 1987
1 time	Zaire	1981

== Precedent games ==
Precedent games before the Central African Games were helds in central Africa. The Jeux de la Coupe des Tropiques from 1962 to 1964 and the Central African Cup in 1972.

Year	Host	Final			Third place match		
Year	Host	Winner	Score	Runner-up	Third	Score	Fourth
Jeux de la Coupe des Tropiques
1962	Bangui, Central African Rep.	Congo	3–0	Cameroon	No third place match		
1964	Yaoundé, Cameroon	Cameroon	2–1	Congo-Léopoldville	Gabon	w/o^{1}	Congo
Central African Cup
1972	Brazzaville, Congo	Congo	^{n/a}	Central African Rep.	Cameroon	^{n/a}	Gabon
1974	N'Djamena, Chad	Cancelled					

^1 Gabon won the third place match, Congo-Brazzaville refused to play.
^n/a A round-robin tournament determined the final standings.
