= Harry Maguire =

English footballer (born 1993)

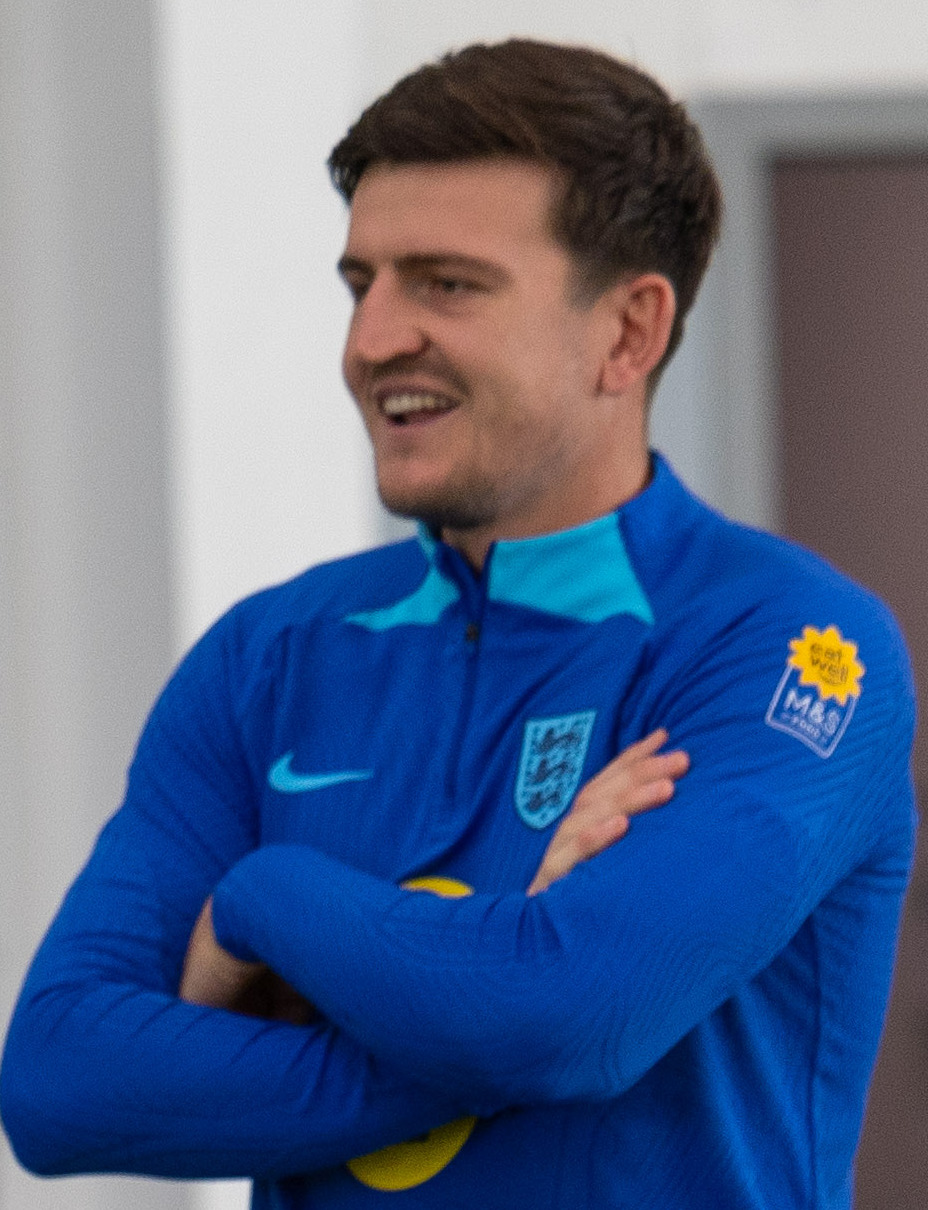
- Maguire with England in 2023

Personal information
- Full name: Harry Jacob Maguire
- Birth name: Jacob Harry Maguire
- Date of birth: 5 March 1993 (age 33)
- Place of birth: Sheffield, South Yorkshire, England
- Height: 6 ft 4 in (1.94 m)
- Position: Centre-back

Team information
- Current team: Manchester United
- Number: 5

Youth career
- –2011: Sheffield United

Senior career*
Years	Team	Apps	(Gls)
2011–2014	Sheffield United	134	(9)
2014–2017	Hull City	54	(2)
2015	→ Wigan Athletic (loan)	16	(1)
2017–2019	Leicester City	69	(5)
2019–	Manchester United	201	(8)

International career^{‡}
2012	England U21	1	(0)
2017–	England	66	(7)
Medal record
Men's football
Representing England
UEFA European Championship
Runner-up	2020 Europe
UEFA Nations League
Third place	2019 Portugal
- * Club domestic league appearances and goals as of 21:11, 22 November 2026 (UTC) ‡ National team caps and goals as of 23:27, 31 March 2026 (UTC)

Harry Jacob Maguire (born Jacob Harry Maguire; 5 March 1993) is an English professional footballer who plays as a centre-back for Premier League club Manchester United and the England national team.

Maguire came through the youth system at Sheffield United before graduating to the first team in 2011. He made 166 appearances for United and was the club's Player of the Year three seasons in succession, also featuring in the PFA Team of the Year for League One as many times. In 2014, he transferred to Hull City for £2.5 million, before being loaned to Wigan Athletic in 2015. He joined Leicester City in 2017 for an initial fee of £12 million and in the 2017–18 season he played in every minute and was named Player of the season. Maguire moved to Manchester United in 2019 for a fee believed to be £80 million, a world-record amount for a defender, and within six months was appointed club captain, a role he held until 2023.

Maguire played one match for the England national under-21 team in 2012. He made his senior debut in 2017, and was chosen for the England squads for the 2018 and 2022 FIFA World Cups, and for UEFA Euro 2020. He earned a place in the Team of the Tournament in the latter.

== Early life ==
Jacob Harry Maguire was born on 5 March 1993 in Sheffield, South Yorkshire, and was raised in the nearby village of Mosborough. His brothers, Joe and Laurence, are also footballers. He attended Immaculate Conception Catholic Primary School in Spinkhill and St Mary's Roman Catholic High School in Chesterfield. From 7 to 16 years old, Maguire played as central midfielder for Sheffield United's academy.

Maguire's birth given name was "Jacob Harry". However, when he was three months old, people around began calling him by the nickname "Jakey" instead of the first name Jacob. His mother disliked this nickname and had started referring him by the middle name Harry. She wanted to swap Maguire's first name and middle name to "Harry Jacob", but due to naming laws, Maguire was only able to do so when he turned 18.

== Club career ==
=== Sheffield United ===
==== 2011–2012 ====
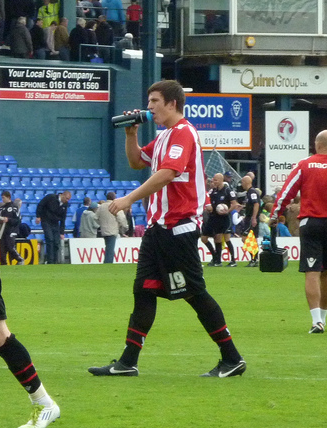
Maguire playing for Sheffield United in 2011

After coming through the youth system at Sheffield United, and with the team struggling against relegation, Maguire was promoted to the first-team squad, making his debut after coming on as a half-time substitute and winning the Man of the Match award in a home match against Cardiff City in April 2011. He made four further appearances that season but could not prevent the club from being relegated to League One.

Having cemented his place in the first team, Maguire scored his first goal for United in a 2–0 win away Oldham Athletic on the opening day of the 2011–12 League One season. Having been ever-present from the start of the season Maguire was handed an extended deal in October to keep him at Bramall Lane until 2015. He continued in great form as United pushed for promotion from League One and was rewarded at the end of the season when he was named as both "Player of the Year" and "Young Player of the Year" by the club. The BBC's Match of the Day magazine selected Maguire in its League One Team of The Year for 2011–12. He was also named in the PFA Team of the Year that season for League One.

==== 2012–2014 ====
Maguire went into the following season as first choice in the centre of defence and his good form continued as he scored twice on 17 October 2012 in a 4–1 away victory over Notts County in the Football League Trophy. By the end of February 2013, Maguire had made his 100th start for United in a 0–0 home draw against Leyton Orient at the age of just 19. His performances during the 2012–13 and 2013–14 seasons earned him a place in the PFA Team of the Year for League One again.

On 21 June 2014, it was revealed that United had offered Maguire an improved contract amid interest from Hull City and Wolverhampton Wanderers, with United already rejecting a £1 million and an improved £1.5 million bid from Wolves.

=== Hull City ===
==== 2014–2016 ====
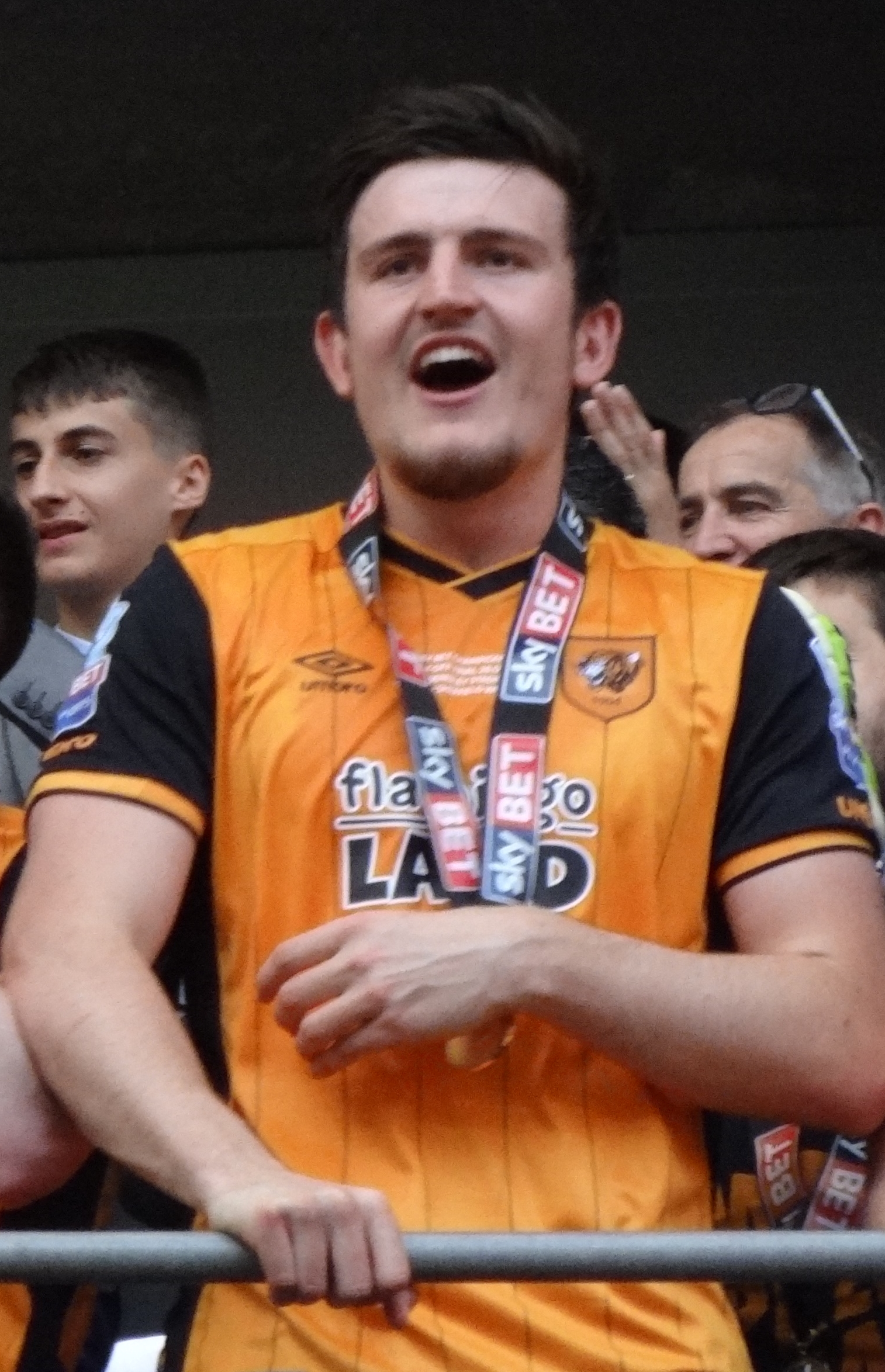
Maguire following Hull City's victory in the 2016 Championship play-off final

On 29 July 2014, Maguire joined Hull City in a deal worth £2.5 million, signing a three-year contract. He made his debut for the Tigers on 21 August in the UEFA Europa League play-off round first leg away to Lokeren of Belgium, a 1–0 defeat. He did not make his Premier League debut until 20 December, when he replaced the injured Curtis Davies for the final 13 minutes of a home loss by the same score against Swansea City.

After making only six appearances across all competitions at Hull, Maguire joined Wigan Athletic of the Championship on a one-month loan deal on 10 February 2015. A week later, he debuted in a 1–0 win at Reading. On 28 February, he scored a header from Jermaine Pennant's cross in a 3–1 win away to Blackpool. Having played as many games in his month-long loan as he had for Hull in the first half of the season, Maguire's stay at the DW Stadium was extended until the end of the season.

==== 2016–2017 ====
While Maguire was out on loan, Hull had been relegated to the Championship. On 28 May 2016, they won promotion back with a 1–0 play-off final win over Sheffield Wednesday at Wembley Stadium, with him replacing goalscorer Mohamed Diamé in the final minute.

In the 2016–17 season, Maguire established himself as a first-team regular under manager Mike Phelan. Maguire scored his first goal for Hull on 25 October 2016 in a 2–1 away win against Bristol City in the EFL Cup. Maguire captained Hull in their league victory against Middlesbrough on 5 April 2017 and scored his first Premier League goal in the 4–2 win. In a season that ended with relegation, he was voted Hull's Player of the Year by both the fans and the players.

=== Leicester City ===
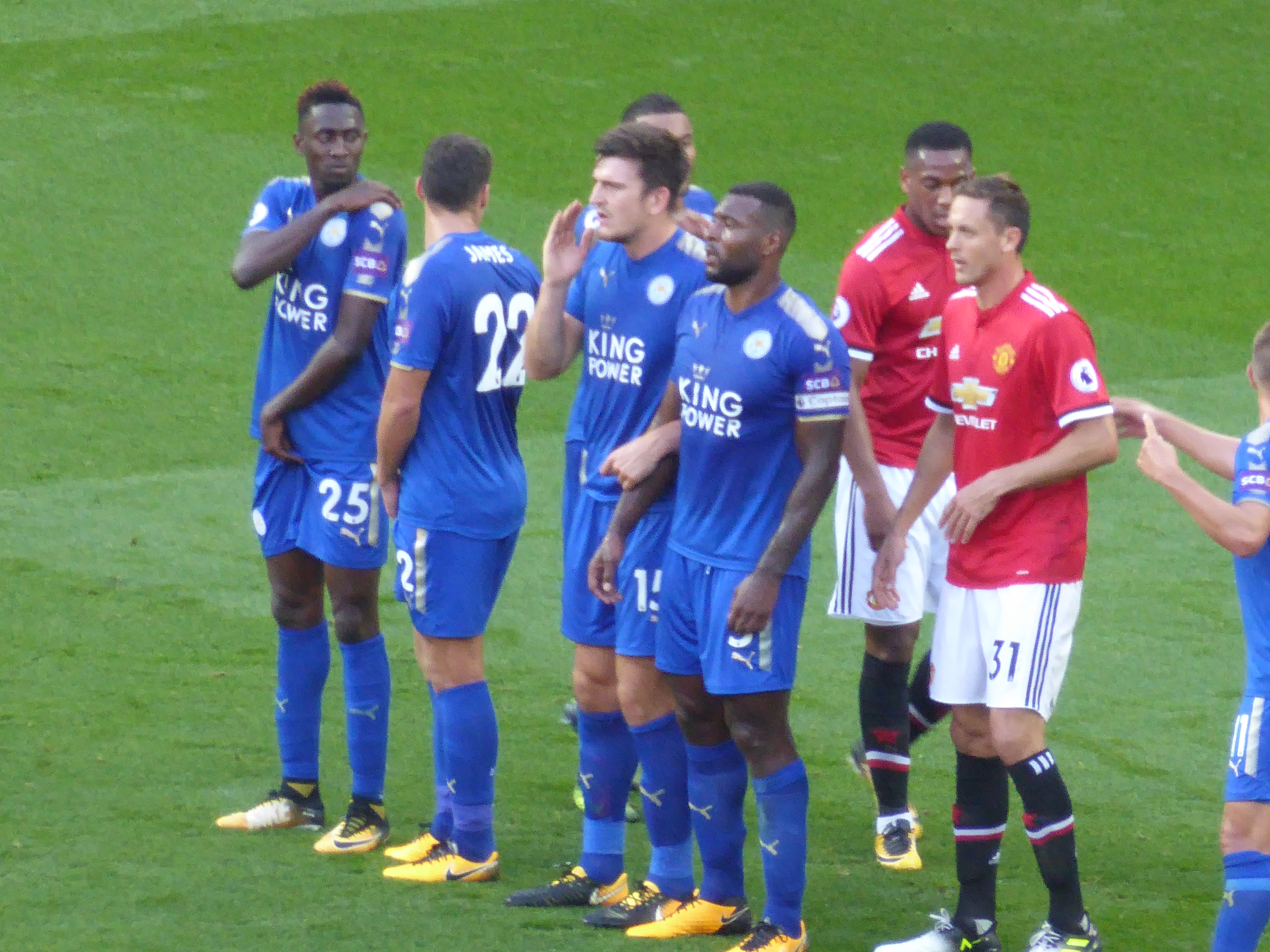
Maguire (third from the left) with Leicester City in August 2017

On 15 June 2017, Maguire signed for Premier League club Leicester City on a five-year contract for an initial £12 million fee, potentially rising to £17 million with add-ons. He made his debut on 11 August as the season began with a 4–3 loss away to Arsenal, and eight days later he scored his first goal for Leicester, heading in Riyad Mahrez's corner to conclude a 2–0 home win over Brighton & Hove Albion. He played in every minute of the 2017–18 season and was awarded Player of the Season, as well as Players' Player of the Season at the club's end of season awards.

Amid speculation about a transfer to Manchester United for a potential world-record fee for a defender, Leicester manager Claude Puel confirmed on transfer deadline day of 9 August 2018 that Maguire would remain at Leicester, his only travel to Manchester being to face United with the Leicester squad in the fixture on the following evening.

On 25 August 2018, Maguire scored a stoppage-time winner in a 2–1 win against Southampton, winning the man of the match award. On 29 September, he scored in a 2–0 win against Newcastle United, winning the Man of the Match award. On 30 January 2019, Maguire scored the equalising goal in a 1–1 draw against Liverpool.

=== Manchester United ===
==== 2019–20 season ====
In July 2019, Manchester United made a £70 million bid for Maguire, a year after the club backed down from a deal because the same fee was considered too high. They made an improved bid, believed to be £80 million, which was accepted by Leicester on 2 August. The fee surpassed the £75 million Liverpool paid for defender Virgil van Dijk in January 2018, making Maguire the world's most expensive defender. The transfer was completed on 5 August, with Maguire signing a six-year contract with the option of a further year. He made his United debut in their opening match of the Premier League season, a 4–0 home victory over Chelsea on 11 August, and received the Man of the Match award.

On 17 January 2020, Maguire was appointed as United's captain by then-manager Ole Gunnar Solskjær following Ashley Young's departure to Inter Milan. On 26 January, he opened up a 6–0 FA Cup win against Tranmere Rovers by scoring his first goal for United. He scored his first Premier League goal for United on 17 February against Chelsea in a 2–0 away win. On 27 June, after the three-month delay caused by the COVID-19 pandemic, United's FA Cup run resumed with a quarter-final tie against Norwich City which finished 2–1, Maguire scoring the winning goal deep into extra time. He played a significant part in United's successful 2019–20 Premier League campaign, which saw the team finish in third place – their second-highest league finish since the retirement of Alex Ferguson. He played in every minute of United's 38-game league campaign, becoming the first outfield player to do so for the club since 1995.

==== 2020–21 season: Europa League final ====
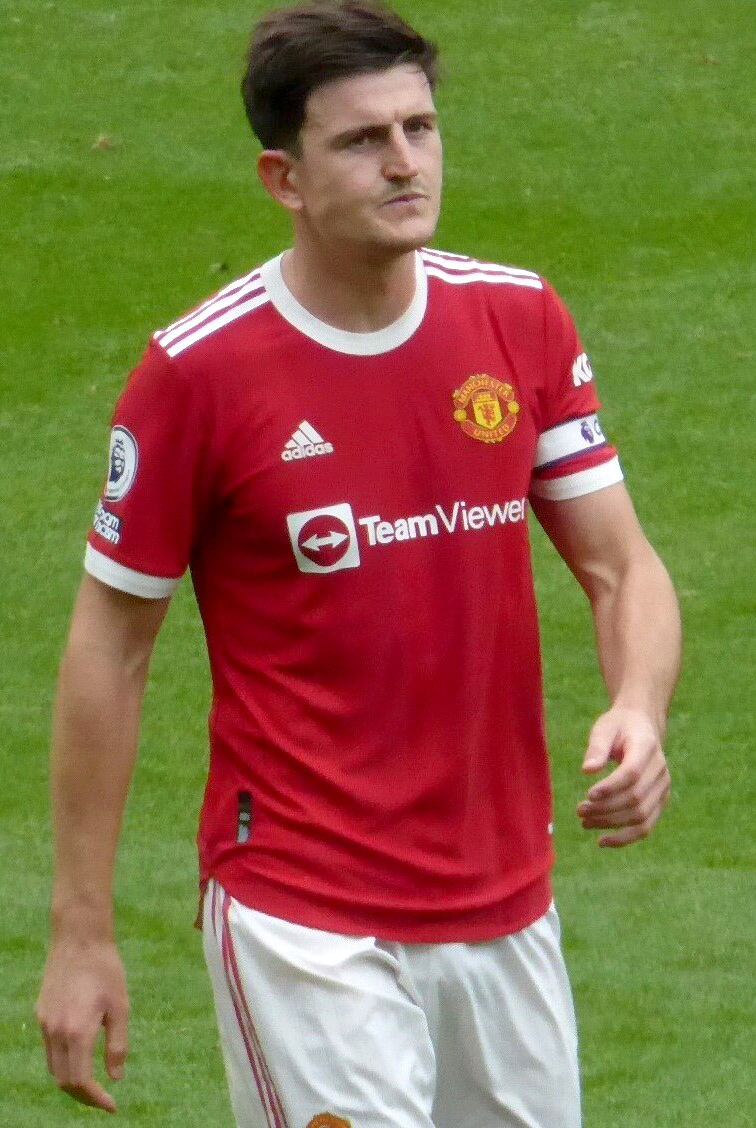
Maguire playing for Manchester United as captain in 2021

On 17 October 2020, Maguire scored his first goal of the season, equalising in the 23rd minute in a league match against Newcastle United that eventually ended in a 4–1 away win. On 27 January 2021, he equalised in the 64th minute even though the match ended in a 2–1 home loss against his former club Sheffield United, which ended a 13-match unbeaten run since the team lost to Arsenal on 1 November 2020. When several teammates received racist threats following the loss, Maguire joined other past and present United players condemning the abuse. He played the full 90 minutes on 2 February in United's Premier League record-equalling 9–0 home win against Southampton.

On 25 April, in a scoreless draw against Leeds United, he equalled Gary Pallister's club record for playing the most league games without being substituted, by playing the full 90 minutes for his 71st consecutive Premier League game. He was unable to break the record, for owing to an ankle injury, he had to be substituted in the 72nd minute of the subsequent game on 9 May, a 3–1 home win over Aston Villa. On 26 May, Maguire missed the 2021 Europa League final against Villarreal due to injury, in which United lost on penalties after a 1–1 draw.

==== 2021–2023: Loss of form and EFL Cup win ====
On 20 October 2021, Maguire scored his first Champions League goal in a 3–2 win over Atalanta. On 20 February 2022, he scored his only Premier League goal of the season in 4–2 away win over Leeds United. Despite winning approximately twice as many duels as he lost in the 2020–21 season, Maguire admitted enduring a "tough" time in which Manchester United finished sixth with their lowest points tally since the formation of the Premier League, in which they conceded 57 goals during the season, the most since the 1978–79 season. Maguire also came under intense criticism for his performances as many believed he had failed to show consistency.

In the 2022–23 season, Maguire started only eight Premier League matches as new manager Erik ten Hag used Raphaël Varane and Lisandro Martínez as his first-choice central defensive partnership. On 26 February, Maguire won the 2023 EFL Cup final as Manchester United beat Newcastle United 2–0 at Wembley Stadium, winning his first trophy with the club though he did not start in the game. Maguire subsequently lifted the trophy with on-field captain Bruno Fernandes, having agreed to do so beforehand providing United won the final. Recounting on his experiences of the season the year after the events occurring within it, Maguire commented: "I played a few games last year, I just didn't play as many as I would have liked... I had two or three opportunities to get a run of games but I broke down with illness and broke down with injuries twice, so I never got the rhythm and never got the run of games so I could prove myself to the manager [ten Hag]."

==== 2023–present: Rise in form ====
On 16 July 2023, Maguire announced that he had been stripped of the Manchester United captaincy after a discussion with manager Erik ten Hag. He was also linked with a transfer to West Ham United. On 20 July, Bruno Fernandes was named as Maguire's successor for club captain. On 28 July, Manchester United rejected an offer of £20 million for Maguire from West Ham United. Two weeks later, the clubs agreed a fee of around £30 million. On 16 August, West Ham announced that there would be no transfer as Maguire wished to stay at United and compete for his place in the team. After a number of games in the 2023–24 season, Maguire replaced Raphaël Varane in ten Hag's preferred centre-back pairing. Ten Hag stated that there had been "internal competition" due to Maguire's rich vein of form and said that his decision had been made due to "tactical reasons".

On 7 October 2023, Maguire provided an assist for Scott McTominay to score his second goal in late stoppage time to give United a 2–1 comeback win against Brentford. On 24 October, he scored the only goal in his first Champions League match of the season, which ended in a 1–0 victory against Copenhagen, to be his club's first and only win in the competition that season. On 12 November, commenting on his decision to stay at Manchester United, Maguire stated: "I really enjoy playing for this club and I was willing to stay and fight for my place." On 6 December, after Maguire had played an integral role in United keeping clean sheets in all their three matches in November, he won the Premier League Player of the Month award for that month. He thus became the first United defender to win the award since Nemanja Vidić in January 2009. Commenting on his award, Maguire stated that he could not "have done it without... [his] team-mates, the staff and... [the] fans", adding that the "love and support" of such people had not gone "unnoticed" and that he "appreciate[d]" this. Maguire was praised by fans for turning his form around despite abuse from some.

On 24 February 2024, Maguire scored a last-minute consolation goal against Fulham in a 2–1 loss. On 21 April, he scored a goal against Coventry City in the FA Cup. On 24 April, Maguire scored Manchester United's first goal in a 4–2 win against his former club Sheffield United.

During the 2024–25 season, Maguire began operating in a three-man-centre-back system for new United head coach Ruben Amorim, stating in an interview with MUTV: "I feel like I've been in a good place for 18 months to two years. There's no doubt I had a difficult spell, I kept my head down, I knew my chance would come and when the chance came I needed to be ready and focused to take it." On 7 February 2025, Maguire scored a last-minute headed goal against former club Leicester City to send United through to the fifth-round of the FA Cup. Replays showed that Maguire was in an offside position, and since VAR was not present in the cup round, the goal stood. On 26 February, Maguire scored the winning goal in a 3–2 win against Ipswich Town. Later that year, on 17 April, in the Europa League quarter-final second leg against French side Olympique Lyonnais, Maguire provided an important assist and scored a stoppage time winner during extra time in the 120th minute. The goal sealed a 5–4 win on the night, and a 7–6 win on aggregate for United, securing their place in the Europa League semi-finals, having been 4–2 down (6–4 on aggregate) down just ten minutes earlier.

On 27 August 2025, Maguire scored a last-minute equaliser against Grimsby Town in the EFL Cup. On 20 September, Maguire provided the winning assist against Chelsea in the Premier League. Almost a month later, on 19 October, he netted his first Premier League goal of the 2025–26 season, the winner in a 2–1 away victory over arch-rivals Liverpool, earning his club their first triumph at Anfield since January 2016.

On 13 January 2026, Michael Carrick returned to Manchester United as head coach, replacing former manager Ruben Amorim. This led to a resurgence in form by both the club (climbing from sixth to third place in the Premier League), and Maguire himself. He received the Man of the Match award in a 3–2 win against Arsenal.

Maguire's form in Manchester United's unbeaten streak in the Premier League under Michael Carrick, from 17 January to 1 March, where he started all seven games, received high praise from both fans and pundits alike.

== International career ==
=== Youth ===
Maguire qualified to play for England, as well as Northern Ireland and the Republic of Ireland through his grandparents. He was called up to the England national under-21 team for the first time in November 2012 for a friendly against Northern Ireland. Danny Wilson stated "He has got a fantastic maturity for his age, he takes everything in his stride and nothing fazes him. I don't expect this call-up to either because he is such a level headed character." Maguire duly made his England under-21 debut as a substitute in the 60th minute, coming on for Liverpool's Andre Wisdom in a 2–0 win against Northern Ireland Under-21s at Bloomfield Road.

=== Senior ===
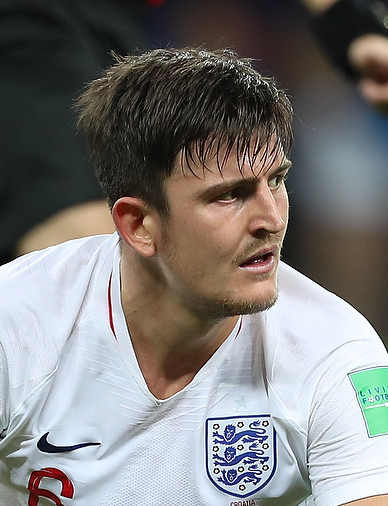
Maguire playing for England at the 2018 FIFA World Cup

On 24 August 2017, England manager Gareth Southgate included Maguire in his squad for the 2018 FIFA World Cup qualification matches against Malta and Slovakia. He made his debut when starting in England's 1–0 away win over Lithuania, which was the team's final match in their successful World Cup qualification campaign. Maguire was named in the England squad for the 2018 FIFA World Cup in Russia. He assisted Harry Kane's winner against Tunisia on 18 June 2018 in England's World Cup opener. England won 2–1. Maguire scored his first England goal on 7 July with a 30th-minute header from Ashley Young's cross in a 2–0 win over Sweden in the quarter-final.

At UEFA Euro 2020, Maguire played his first match against Czech Republic in the last fixture of the group stage. Afterwards, he featured in the round of 16, when England won 2–0 against Germany, for which he was awarded the Star of the Match. On 3 July 2021, Maguire scored the second goal for England in a 4–0 win over Ukraine in the quarter-finals.

Maguire started in the semi-finals against Denmark, and then in the final against Italy, in which the score was 1–1 after 120 minutes. In the resulting penalty shoot-out Maguire scored England's second penalty, however, England went on to lose 3–2. His performances during the tournament earned him a place in the Euro 2020 Team of the Tournament.

On 15 November 2021, Maguire scored the opening goal in a 10–0 victory over San Marino on the final day of 2022 World Cup qualification, making him England's highest-scoring defender with seven goals, surpassing John Terry and Jack Charlton. Maguire was selected for England's squad for the 2022 FIFA World Cup in Qatar where he earned praise for a controlling performance in a 0–0 draw against the United States – a game in which he made his 50th appearance for England – as well as for consistent and successful performances in the latter stages of the tournament. Maguire was selected for Sky Sports's 2022 World Cup Team of the Tournament.

On 6 June 2024, Maguire was dropped from the England squad for UEFA Euro 2024 after failing to recover from a calf injury.

On 22 May 2026, Maguire was excluded from the England squad for the 2026 FIFA World Cup. In an Instagram post, Maguire stated that, although he was "confident [he] could have played a major part [in the] summer for [his] country after the season", he has been left "shocked and gutted". Despite the fact he would not play in the 2026 World Cup, in June 2026 it was revealed that Maguire had been signed up to appear on the The Rest Is Football podcast (hosted by Gary Lineker). Lineker himself revealed in an interview with Talksport that this deal had been signed a significant amount of time in advance to his non-selection by England. Lineker also revealed that Maguire requested his deal with the podcast included a get out clause in case of his potential England selection which ultimately did not materialise.

== Style of play ==
Recognised primarily for his authoritative defending, Maguire is also known for his composure and elegance on the ball as well as his physical strength and presence. He is also known for his ability to score powerful headers.

== Personal life ==
In February 2018, Maguire got engaged to his long-term girlfriend Fern Hawkins after seven years of dating. The couple married on 25 June 2022 at the Chateau de Varennes in South Burgundy, France. On 3 April 2019, Maguire announced that Hawkins had given birth to their first child, a daughter. Maguire and Hawkins had their second daughter on 9 May 2020.

In 2022, Maguire was targeted with a bomb threat, resulting in the police sweeping his house for devices.

In January 2025, Maguire received a 56-day driving ban and a £1,052 fine for exceeding a local speed limit by 35 mph.

=== Altercation in Greece ===
On 21 August 2020, Maguire was arrested on the Greek island of Mykonos after an incident involving the police. In a statement, Manchester United claimed that he was "fully co-operating with the Greek authorities". After spending two days in detention, Maguire appeared in court on the island of Syros. He was charged with aggravated assault, resisting arrest and attempted bribery, being released from custody pending his trial on 25 August.

On 25 August 2020, Maguire was convicted of all three charges. Because this was a first offence and the charges had been classified as misdemeanours, he was sentenced to prison, the term suspended, for 21 months and 10 days. The next day, his legal team lodged an appeal; the verdict was upheld on 4 March 2026, with Maguire given a suspended prison sentence of 15 months.

== Career statistics ==
=== Club ===
As of match played 22 November 2026

Appearances and goals by club, season and competition
Club	Season	League			FA Cup		League Cup		Europe		Other		Total	
Club	Season	Division	Apps	Goals	Apps	Goals	Apps	Goals	Apps	Goals	Apps	Goals	Apps	Goals
Sheffield United	2010–11	Championship	5	0	0	0	0	0	—		—		5	0
Sheffield United	2011–12	League One	44	1	4	0	2	0	—		6 (Note: Three appearances in Football League Trophy, three appearances in League One play-offs)	0	56	1
Sheffield United	2012–13	League One	44	3	4	0	1	0	—		4 (Note: Two appearances and two goals in Football League Trophy, two appearances in League One play-offs)	2	53	5
Sheffield United	2013–14	League One	41	5	8	1	1	0	—		2 (Note: Appearances in Football League Trophy)	0	52	6
Sheffield United	Total		134	9	16	1	4	0	—		12	2	166	12
Hull City	2014–15	Premier League	3	0	1	0	1	0	1 (Note: Appearance(s) in UEFA Europa League)	0	—		6	0
Hull City	2015–16	Championship	22	0	4	0	5	0	—		2 (Note: Appearances in Championship play-offs)	0	33	0
Hull City	2016–17	Premier League	29	2	1	0	6	1	—		—		36	3
Hull City	Total		54	2	6	0	12	1	1	0	2	0	75	3
Wigan Athletic (loan)	2014–15	Championship	16	1	—		—		—		—		16	1
Leicester City	2017–18	Premier League	38	2	3	0	3	0	—		—		44	2
Leicester City	2018–19	Premier League	31	3	0	0	1	0	—		—		32	3
Leicester City	Total		69	5	3	0	4	0	—		—		76	5
Manchester United	2019–20	Premier League	38	1	5	2	3	0	9	0	—		55	3
Manchester United	2020–21	Premier League	34	2	4	0	3	0	11 (Note: Five appearances in UEFA Champions League, six appearances in UEFA Europa League)	0	—		52	2
Manchester United	2021–22	Premier League	30	1	1	0	0	0	6 (Note: Appearances in UEFA Champions League)	1	—		37	2
Manchester United	2022–23	Premier League	16	0	4	0	4	0	7	0	—		31	0
Manchester United	2023–24	Premier League	22	2	3	1	2	0	4	1	—		31	4
Manchester United	2024–25	Premier League	27	1	3	1	1	0	8	2	1 (Note: Appearance in FA Community Shield)	0	40	4
Manchester United	2025–26	Premier League	23	1	1	0	1	1	—		—		25	2
Manchester United	2026–27	Premier League	11	0	0	0	0	0	3	0	—		14	0
Manchester United	Total		201	8	21	4	14	1	48	4	1	0	285	17
Career total			474	25	46	5	34	2	49	4	15	2	618	38

=== International ===
As of match played 31 March 2026

Appearances and goals by national team and year
National team	Year	Apps	Goals
England	2017	3	0
England	2018	13	1
England	2019	10	0
England	2020	4	1
England	2021	11	5
England	2022	12	0
England	2023	9	0
England	2024	2	0
England	2025	0	0
England	2026	2	0
Total		66	7

As of match played 31 March 2026
England score listed first, score column indicates score after each Maguire goal

List of international goals scored by Harry Maguire
No.	Date	Venue	Cap	Opponent	Score	Result	Competition	Ref.
1	7 July 2018	Cosmos Arena, Samara, Russia	10	Sweden	1–0	2–0	2018 FIFA World Cup	
2	12 November 2020	Wembley Stadium, London, England	29	Republic of Ireland	1–0	3–0	Friendly	
3	31 March 2021	Wembley Stadium, London, England	32	Poland	2–1	2–1	2022 FIFA World Cup qualification	
4	3 July 2021	Stadio Olimpico, Rome, Italy	35	Ukraine	2–0	4–0	UEFA Euro 2020	
5	2 September 2021	Puskás Aréna, Budapest, Hungary	38	Hungary	3–0	4–0	2022 FIFA World Cup qualification	
6	12 November 2021	Wembley Stadium, London, England	40	Albania	1–0	5–0	2022 FIFA World Cup qualification	
7	15 November 2021	San Marino Stadium, Serravalle, San Marino	41	San Marino	1–0	10–0	2022 FIFA World Cup qualification	

== Honours ==
Hull City

- Football League Championship play-offs: 2016

Manchester United

- EFL Cup: 2022–23
- FA Cup: 2023-24; runner-up: 2022–23
- UEFA Europa League runner-up: 2020–21, 2024–25

England

- UEFA European Championship runner-up: 2020
- UEFA Nations League third place: 2018–19

Individual

- PFA Team of the Year: 2011–12 League One, 2012–13 League One, 2013–14 League One
- PFA Fans' Player of the Year: 2013–14 League One
- Football League One Team of the Season: 2013–14
- Football League Young Player of the Month: August 2011
- Sheffield United Player of the Year: 2011–12, 2012–13, 2013–14
- Sheffield United Young Player of the Year: 2011–12
- Hull City Fans' Player of the Year: 2016–17
- Hull City Players' Player of the Year: 2016–17
- Leicester City Player of the Season: 2017–18
- Leicester City Players' Player of the Season: 2017–18
- UEFA Europa League Squad of the Season: 2020–21
- UEFA European Championship Team of the Tournament: 2020
- Premier League Player of the Month: November 2023
