= Jack Moorhouse =

Irish footballer (born 2005)

- Moorhouse with Dundee in 2026

Personal information
- Full name: Jack Lee Moorhouse
- Date of birth: 29 November 2005 (age 20)
- Place of birth: Manchester, England
- Height: 6 ft 0 in (1.84 m)
- Position: Midfielder

Team information
- Current team: Manchester United
- Number: 48

Youth career
- 2022–2025: Manchester United

Senior career*
Years	Team	Apps	(Gls)
2025–	Manchester United	0	(0)
2025–2026	→ Leyton Orient (loan)	20	(0)
2026	→ Dundee (loan)	2	(0)

International career^{‡}
2025–2026	Republic of Ireland U21	5	(0)
- * Club domestic league appearances and goals as of 21:44, 30 September 2026 (UTC) ‡ National team caps and goals as of 00:22, 18 November 2026 (UTC)

Jack Lee Moorhouse (born 29 November 2005) is a professional footballer who plays as a midfielder for Premier League club Manchester United. Born in England, he represented the Republic of Ireland at Under-21 level.

== Club career ==
=== Youth career ===
A central midfielder, he made his under-18s debut for Manchester United when he was 15 years-old, going on to feature in the FA Youth Cup. He continued to play for the U18s at the start of the 2023–24 season before suffering an injury that ruled him out of action for over a year. He returned to the Manchester United U21 team during the 2024–25 season and was nominated for the Premier League 2 Player of the Month award in December 2024.

=== Manchester United ===
He was promoted to train with the first team in January 2025. He travelled with the Manchester United first-team squad for their Premier League match against Tottenham Hotspur on 16 February 2025, and was named amongst the match-day substitutes.

==== Leyton Orient loan ====
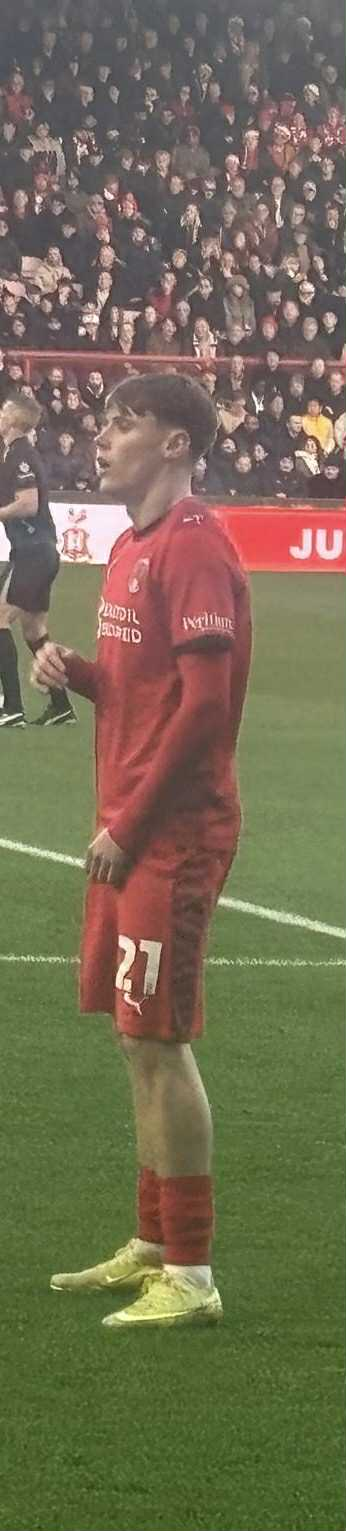
Moorhouse with Leyton Orient in 2025

In August 2025 he moved on loan to Leyton Orient. He made his first start for Leyton Orient on 12 August 2025 in their EFL Cup 1–0 defeat at home against Wycombe Wanderers. He returned to United on deadline day in February 2026 after making 24 appearances for the Londoners.

==== Dundee loan ====
On 2 September 2026, Moorhouse joined Scottish Premiership club Dundee on a season-long loan. He made just two league appearances for the club before his season was ended by an Anterior cruciate ligament injury suffered in a friendly match against Partick Thistle on 22 September 2026, with Moorhouse returning to his parent club after a scan confirmed the injury.

== International career ==
Born in England, he is eligible to play for the Republic of Ireland, and was called into an Ireland U19s training camp in the summer of 2023. Moorhouse received his first Republic of Ireland U21 call up in March 2025 for friendlies against Scotland U21 & Hungary U21 in Spain. He made his debut for the side against Scotland U21 on 21 March, in a 2–0 defeat.

== Style of play ==
His ball-carrying prowess has stood out at junior level.

== Career statistics ==
=== Club ===
As of match played on 19 September 2026

Club	Season	League			National Cup		League Cup		Europe		Other		Total	
Club	Season	Division	Apps	Goals	Apps	Goals	Apps	Goals	Apps	Goals	Apps	Goals	Apps	Goals
Manchester United U21	2024–25	—			—		—		—		1 (Note: Appearance(s) in EFL Trophy)	0	1	0
Manchester United	2024–25	Premier League	0	0	0	0	0	0	0	0	0	0	0	0
Manchester United	2025–26	Premier League	0	0	0	0	0	0	—		—		0	0
Manchester United	2026–27	Premier League	0	0	0	0	—		0	0	—		0	0
Manchester United	Total		0	0	0	0	0	0	0	0	0	0	0	0
Leyton Orient (loan)	2025–26	League One	20	0	0	0	1	0	—		3	2	24	2
Dundee (loan)	2026–27	Scottish Premiership	2	0	—		—		—		0	0	2	0
Career total			22	0	0	0	1	0	0	0	4	2	27	2
