= François Omam-Biyik =

Cameroonian footballer and manager (born 1966)

Personal information
- Date of birth: 21 May 1966 (age 60)
- Place of birth: Sackbayene, Cameroon
- Height: 1.84 m (6 ft 0 in)
- Position: Forward

Team information
- Current team: Cameroon (assistant)

Senior career*
Years	Team	Apps	(Gls)
1986–1987	Canon Yaoundé		
1987–1990	Laval	81	(27)
1990–1991	Rennes	38	(14)
1991–1992	Cannes	35	(7)
1992	Marseille	1	(0)
1992–1994	Lens	53	(18)
1994–1997	América	75	(49)
1997	Atlético Yucatán	21	(10)
1997–1998	Sampdoria	6	(0)
1998–1999	Atlante	0	(0)
1999	Puebla	17	(5)
1999–2000	Cháteauroux	3	(0)

International career
1985–1998	Cameroon	74	(26)

Managerial career
- 2005–2006: EGC Touvent Châteauroux
- 2007: Palmeros
- 2008: Real Colima
- 2009–2010: Saint-Christophe Châteauroux
- 2010–2011: EGC Touvent Châteauroux
- 2010–2011: Cameroon (assistant)
- 2013: Gomido
- 2013–2019: US Bitam
- 2019–: Cameroon (assistant)
Medal record
Men's football
Representing Cameroon
Africa Cup of Nations
Winner	1988 Morocco
Afro-Asian Cup of Nations
Winner	1985 Cameroon
- * Club domestic league appearances and goals

François Omam-Biyik (born 21 May 1966) is a Cameroonian football manager and former player who works as assistant manager of Cameroon.

A forward, he was one of the most important players of the Cameroon national team in the nineties, playing at the three World Cups in 1990, 1994 and 1998. He played 73 international matches in total.

== Early life ==
Omam-Biyik started out as a goalkeeper, and later a defender, before converting into a striker at the age of 16.

== Club career ==
Omam-Biyik had success with different French clubs before moving to Marseille in the summer of 1992. He only played one match, and was transferred to Lens in October 1992. After a few years he continued his career in Mexico with Club América and Puebla F.C., with short stops in European clubs towards the late nineties. Omam-Biyik retired after the 1999–2000 season.

In 1987 and 1991 he finished third in a run for an African Footballer of the Year award.

In 2003, he played in the Adecmac amateur soccer league in Mexico City with Club Deportivo Sahara, where he scored 10 goals in the season.

== International career ==
Omam-Biyik's greatest moment came when he scored the downward header that gave Cameroon a historic 1–0 win over defending world champions Argentina in the San Siro in the opening match of the 1990 World Cup. He and his brother André helped Cameroon to the quarter-finals.

He also scored against Sweden in the first round of the 1994 World Cup.

He was called up to 1998 World Cup, which was his third.

Omam-Biyik scored a total of 26 goals in 73 appearances. He is Cameroon's record World Cup player, with 11 matches in three tournaments.

== Style of play ==
Omam-Biyik's aerial ability led to the term "Omam-Biyik" being used as a nickname for a headed goal. While he took part in high jumping at school, he says he was "born" with his heading ability.

== Managerial career ==
Following his retirement Omam-Biyik moved to Colima, Mexico, where he was the head coach of the city's Second Division professional soccer team.

Omam-Biyik was appointed assistant coach of the Indomitable Lions (Cameroon football team) for a two-year tenure, with Spaniard Javier Clemente as head coach.

Omam-Biyik became the head coach of Togolese side Gomido FC in May 2013. He pledged to help rebuild the first team but worked with the club for just two months.

On 20 July 2013, Omam-Biyik was signed to coach Gabonese champions Union Sportive de Bitam, replacing his compatriot Thomas Libiih.

At the end of September 2019, Omam-Biyik was appointed assistant manager under newly hired manager Toni Conceição for Cameroon.

== Personal life ==
He is the father of Emilio Omam-Biyik and cousin of Francis Eliezer Omam, both of whom are footballers. François' older brother, André, and André's sons, Jean-Armel, and Enzo, are also footballers.

== Career statistics ==
=== International ===
Appearances and goals by national team and year
National team	Year	Apps	Goals
Cameroon	1985	10	2
Cameroon	1986	4	2
Cameroon	1987	16	7
Cameroon	1988	1	0
Cameroon	1989	7	4
Cameroon	1990	8	1
Cameroon	1991	4	2
Cameroon	1992	5	1
Cameroon	1993	5	2
Cameroon	1994	4	1
Cameroon	1995	1	0
Cameroon	1996	3	2
Cameroon	1997	3	0
Cameroon	1998	6	3
Total		77	27

Scores and results list Cameroon's goal tally first, score column indicates score after each Omam-Biyik goal.

List of international goals scored by François Omam-Biyik
No.	Date	Venue	Opponent	Score	Result	Competition	Ref.
1	15 September 1985	Ahmadou Ahidjo Stadium, Yaoundé, Cameroon	Saudi Arabia	1–0	4–1	Friendly	
2	4 October 1985	King Fahd International Stadium, Riyadh, Saudi Arabia	Saudi Arabia	1–1	1–2	Friendly	
3	11 December 1986	Malabo, Equatorial Guinea	Chad	1–1	3–1	1986 UDEAC Cup	
4	19 December 1986	Bata, Equatorial Guinea	Chad	3–1	4–1	1986 UDEAC Cup	
5	29 March 1987	Ahmadou Ahidjo Stadium, Yaoundé, Cameroon	Uganda	3–1	5–1	1988 African Cup of Nations qualification	
6	29 March 1987	Ahmadou Ahidjo Stadium, Yaoundé, Cameroon	Uganda	4–1	5–1	1988 African Cup of Nations qualification	
7	11 April 1987	Nakivubo Stadium, Kampala, Uganda	Uganda	1–3	1–3	1988 African Cup of Nations qualification	
8	20 April 1987	Stade Alphonse Massemba-Débat, Brazzaville, Congo	Gabon	2–0	2–0	1987 Central African Games	
9	27 April 1987	Stade Alphonse Massemba-Débat, Brazzaville, Congo	Congo	–	3–0	1987 Central African Games	
10	5 July 1987	Ahmadou Ahidjo Stadium, Yaoundé, Cameroon	Sudan	1–0	2–0	1988 African Cup of Nations qualification	
11	14 November 1987	Ahmadou Ahidjo Stadium, Yaoundé, Cameroon	Ghana	2–2	2–2	1988 Summer Olympics qualification	
12	22 January 1989	Ahmadou Ahidjo Stadium, Yaoundé, Cameroon	Gabon	1–0	3–1	1990 FIFA World Cup qualification	
13	25 June 1989	Estádio da Cidadela, Luanda, Angola	Angola	1–1	2–1	1990 FIFA World Cup qualification	
14	27 August 1989	Ahmadou Ahidjo Stadium, Yaoundé, Cameroon	Nigeria	1–0	1–0	1990 FIFA World Cup qualification	
15	19 November 1989	El Menzah Stadium, Tunis, Tunisia	Tunisia	1–0	1–0	1990 FIFA World Cup qualification	
16	8 June 1990	San Siro, Milan, Italy	Argentina	1–0	1–0	1990 FIFA World Cup	
17	28 April 1991	Stade Modibo Kéïta, Bamako, Mali	Mali	2–0	2–0	1992 African Cup of Nations qualification	
18	28 July 1991	Ahmadou Ahidjo Stadium, Yaoundé, Cameroon	Guinea	1–0	1–0	1992 African Cup of Nations qualification	
19	16 January 1992	Stade de l'Amitié, Dakar, Senegal	Zaire	1–1	1–1	1992 African Cup of Nations	
20	10 October 1993	Ahmadou Ahidjo Stadium, Yaoundé, Cameroon	Zimbabwe	1–0	3–1	1994 FIFA World Cup qualification	
21	10 October 1993	Ahmadou Ahidjo Stadium, Yaoundé, Cameroon	Zimbabwe	2–0	3–1	1994 FIFA World Cup qualification	
22	19 June 1994	Rose Bowl, Pasadena, United States	Sweden	2–1	2–2	1994 FIFA World Cup	
23	18 January 1996	FNB Stadium, Johannesburg, South Africa	Egypt	1–0	2–1	1996 African Cup of Nations	
24	24 January 1996	Kings Park Stadium, Durban, South Africa	Angola	1–0	3–3	1996 African Cup of Nations	
25	31 May 1998	Stade Josy Barthel, Luxembourg City, Luxembourg	Luxembourg	1–0	2–0	Friendly	
26	5 June 1998	Parken Stadium, Copenhagen, Denmark	Denmark	1–0	2–1	Friendly	
27	5 June 1998	Parken Stadium, Copenhagen, Denmark	Denmark	2–0	2–1	Friendly	

== Honours ==
Lens

- Coupe de la Ligue: 1994

Cameroon

- African Cup of Nations: 1988
- Afro-Asian Cup of Nations: 1985

Sporting positions
Preceded by Alessandro Altobelli	FIFA World Cup opening goal 1990	Succeeded by Jürgen Klinsmann
