= Football at the 1987 Central African Games =

1987 Central African Games football tournament
Tournament details
- Host country: Republic of the Congo
- City: Brazzaville
- Dates: 18–30 April
- Teams: 6 (from 2 confederations)
- Venue: (in 1 host city)

Final positions
- Champions: Cameroon (2nd title)
- Runners-up: Angola
- Third place: Congo

Tournament statistics
- Matches played: 11
- Goals scored: 33 (3 per match)

The 1987 Central African Games football tournament was the 3rd edition of the Central African Games men's football tournament. The football tournament was held in Brazzaville, Congo between 18 and 30 April 1987 as part of the 1987 Central African Games. The competition served for the qualification for the 1987 All-Africa Games football tournament.

== Participating teams ==
Six teams took part to the tournament:

- Angola
- Cameroon
- Chad
- Congo (hosts)
- Gabon
- Zaire

== Group stage ==
=== Group A ===
Team	Pld	W	D	L	GF	GA	GD	Pts
Angola	2	1	1	0	5	4	+1	4
Congo	2	0	2	0	3	3	0	2
Zaire	2	0	1	1	1	2	−1	1

18 April 1987

Congo	3–3	Angola
		Avelino 12'; Jesus 22', 75'

Brazzaville

21 April 1987

Angola	2–1	Zaire

Brazzaville

23 April 1987

Congo	0–0	Zaire

Brazzaville

=== Group B ===
Team	Pld	W	D	L	GF	GA	GD	Pts
Cameroon	2	2	0	0	5	0	+5	6
Gabon	2	1	0	1	3	3	0	3
Chad	2	0	0	2	1	6	−5	0

20 April 1987

Cameroon	2–0	Gabon
Kana-Biyik 29'; Omam-Biyik 64'

Stade Alphonse Massemba-Débat, Brazzaville

22 April 1987

Gabon	3–1	Chad
Doucka 19'; Nguéma 41'; Raouto 82'

Brazzaville

24 April 1987

Cameroon	3–0	Chad

Brazzaville

== Knockout stage ==
=== Semifinals ===
27 April 1987

Angola	1–0	Gabon
Jesus 45'

Brazzaville

27 April 1987

Cameroon	3–0	Congo
Omam-Biyik; Kundé; M'Fédé

Stade Alphonse Massemba-Débat, Brazzaville

=== Fifth place Match ===
29 April 1987

Zaire	4–0	Chad

Brazzaville

=== Third place Match ===
29 April 1987

Congo	3–2	Gabon

Brazzaville

=== Final ===
30 April 1987

Cameroon	2–0	Angola

Stade de la Revolution, Brazzaville
