= Francis Omam =

Cameroonian footballer

Personal information
- Full name: Francis Eliezer Omam
- Date of birth: 11 May 1973 (age 53)
- Height: 1.80 m (5 ft 11 in)
- Position: Forward

Senior career*
Years	Team	Apps	(Gls)
- Canon Yaoundé
1997–2000	Spartak-Telekom Shuya	68	(16)
2003–2004	Pietà Hotspurs	?	(2)

International career
- Cameroon U-21
- * Club domestic league appearances and goals

Francis Eliezer Omam (Russian: Френсис Элиезер Омам; born 11 May 1973) is a Cameroonian former professional footballer who played as a forward. He is a cousin of former Cameroonian international footballer François Omam-Biyik.

== Career ==
Francis Omam started his footballing career in his native Cameroon, coming a way from Third Division to the top flight, where he played for Canon Yaoundé.

In 1997, he decided to move to Russia to study in the city of Ivanovo, where he signed for a local team Spartak-Telekom Shuya. In 1998 Spartak-Telecom promoted to Russian Second Division, the fully professional third level of Russian football.

In 2000 usage of foreign players in Second Division became prohibited, thus leaving Omam out of competitive football. The same spring he met a Russian girl, a student of a local university. They married in summer of 2000 and soon thereafter he received a Russian passport and became a citizen of Russia. In June Omam returned to the club.

Omam spent a total of four seasons with Spartak-Telekom, including three in Second Division, before leaving the club in 2001 as he hoped to pursue his career somewhere in Western Europe.

In 2003–04 season he played for Pietà Hotspurs of Maltese Premier League.

Recently he was noted playing in Italy for Panicale in 2008–09 and Sant'Erminio Montebagnolo in 2009–10, both of Seconda Categoria.
