= André Kana-Biyik =

Cameroonian footballer (born 1965)

Personal information
- Full name: André Kana-Biyik
- Date of birth: 1 September 1965 (age 61)
- Place of birth: Sackbayene, Cameroon
- Height: 1.82 m (6 ft 0 in)
- Position: Defender

Senior career*
| Years | Team | Apps | (Gls) |
| 1986–1988 | Diamant Yaoundé | ? | (?) |
| 1988–1990 | Metz | 20 | (1) |
| 1990–1994 | Le Havre | 73 | (6) |
| Total | | 93 | (7) |

International career
| 1985–1994 | Cameroon | 64 | (15) |
Medal record
Men's football
Representing Cameroon
Africa Cup of Nations
| Winner | 1988 Morocco |
| Runner-up | 1986 Egypt |
Afro-Asian Cup of Nations
| Winner | 1985 Cameroon |
- * Club domestic league appearances and goals

André Kana-Biyik (born 1 September 1965) is a former Cameroonian footballer who played as a defender. The brother of François, he started a professional career in 1986 with Diamant Yaoundé. From 1988 to 1994 he played in France Ligue 1 with FC Metz and Le Havre AC, making 93 appearances and scoring 8 goals. With the Cameroon national football team he participated at the 1990 and 1994 FIFA World Cups.

Kana-Biyik was sent off in Cameroon's opening game of the 1990 World Cup, a game against Argentina that Cameroon won 1–0. His brother, François Omam-Biyik, scored the goal that defeated the South Americans. Having been suspended for the second match against Romania following his red card in the first, he returned to the team, and picked up yellow cards both in the third group-stage match against the USSR (a heavy defeat, but irrelevant since they were already guaranteed qualification), and the second-round match against Colombia (an extra-time victory): and was thus suspended for a second time in the tournament, for the quarter-final against England - thus becoming the only player so far to receive two non-concurrent suspensions in a single World Cup tournament. His sons, Jean-Armel and Enzo Kana-Biyik, are also a professional footballers.

== Career statistics ==
=== International ===
Appearances and goals by national team and year
| National team | Year | Apps | Goals |
|---|---|---|---|
| Cameroon | 1985 | 5 | 1 |
| Cameroon | 1986 | 10 | 4 |
| Cameroon | 1987 | 17 | 6 |
| Cameroon | 1988 | 5 | 0 |
| Cameroon | 1989 | 8 | 3 |
| Cameroon | 1990 | 6 | 0 |
| Cameroon | 1991 | 1 | 0 |
| Cameroon | 1992 | 5 | 1 |
| Cameroon | 1993 | 2 | 0 |
| Cameroon | 1994 | 5 | 0 |
| Total | | 64 | 15 |

Scores and results list Cameroon's goal tally first, score column indicates score after each Kana-Biyik goal.

List of international goals scored by André Kana-Biyik
| No. | Date | Venue | Opponent | Score | Result | Competition | Ref. |
|---|---|---|---|---|---|---|---|
| 1 | 7 April 1985 | Independence Stadium, Lusaka, Zambia | Zambia | 1–4 | 1–4 | 1986 FIFA World Cup qualification | |
| 2 | 26 February 1986 | Chedly Zouiten Stadium, Tunis, Tunisia | Tunisia | – | 1–1 | Friendly | |
| 3 | 14 March 1986 | Alexandria Stadium, Alexandria, Egypt | Algeria | 1–1 | 3–2 | 1986 Africa Cup of Nations | |
| 4 | 14 March 1986 | Alexandria Stadium, Alexandria, Egypt | Algeria | 2–1 | 3–2 | 1986 Africa Cup of Nations | |
| 5 | 19 December 1986 | Bata, Equatorial Guinea | Chad | 2–1 | 4–1 | 1986 UDEAC Cup | |
| 6 | 20 April 1987 | Stade Alphonse Massemba-Débat, Brazzaville, Republic of the Congo | Gabon | 1–0 | 2–0 | 1987 Central African Games | |
| 7 | 27 June 1987 | Civo Stadium, Lilongwe, Malawi | Malawi | 1–0 | 1–1 | 1988 Summer Olympics qualification | |
| 8 | 12 July 1987 | Ahmadou Ahidjo Stadium, Yaoundé, Cameroon | Malawi | 3–0 | 3–0 | 1988 Summer Olympics qualification | |
| 9 | 1 August 1987 | Moi International Sports Centre, Kasarani, Kenya | Madagascar | 2–0 | 3–0 | 1987 All-Africa Games | |
| 10 | 1 August 1987 | Moi International Sports Centre, Kasarani, Kenya | Madagascar | 3–0 | 3–0 | 1987 All-Africa Games | |
| 11 | 9 August 1987 | Nyayo National Stadium, Nairobi, Kenya | Egypt | 1–1 | 1–1 | 1987 All-Africa Games | |
| 12 | 22 January 1989 | Ahmadou Ahidjo Stadium, Yaoundé, Cameroon | Gabon | – | 3–1 | 1990 FIFA World Cup qualification | |
| 13 | 25 June 1989 | Estádio da Cidadela, Luanda, Angola | Angola | 2–1 | 2–1 | 1990 FIFA World Cup qualification | |
| 14 | 13 August 1989 | Ahmadou Ahidjo Stadium, Yaoundé, Cameroon | Gabon | 1–0 | 2–1 | 1990 FIFA World Cup qualification | |
| 15 | 12 January 1992 | Stade de l'Amitié, Dakar, Senegal | Morocco | 1–0 | 1–0 | 1992 Africa Cup of Nations | |

== Honours ==
Cameroon

- African Cup of Nations: 1988; runner-up, 1986
- Afro-Asian Cup of Nations: 1985
