= 2025–26 Manchester United F.C. season =

English football club season

Manchester United
2025–26 season
- Owner: Manchester United plc (71.06%); Ineos (28.94%)
- Co-chairmen: Joel and Avram Glazer
- Head coach: Ruben Amorim (until 5 January); Darren Fletcher (caretaker; 5–13 January); Michael Carrick (from 13 January)
- Stadium: Old Trafford
- Premier League: 3rd
- FA Cup: Third round
- EFL Cup: Second round
- Top goalscorer: League: Benjamin Šeško; Bryan Mbeumo (11 each); All: Benjamin Šeško; Bryan Mbeumo (12 each)
- Highest home attendance: 74,257 (v. Burnley, 30 August 2025)
- Lowest home attendance: 73,475 (v. Arsenal, 17 August 2025)
- Average home league attendance: 73,975
Home colours	Away colours	Third colours

The 2025–26 season was the 139th season in the history of Manchester United, their 34th season in the Premier League and their 51st consecutive and 101st overall season in the top flight of English football. The club competed in the Premier League, FA Cup and EFL Cup, but not in European competitions for the first time since 2014–15. With the retirement of Jonny Evans, United are without a Premier League winner in their squad for the first time since the competition's inaugural season in the 1992–93 season, and without a player who had played under Sir Alex Ferguson.

Ruben Amorim began the campaign as head coach but was dismissed in January, after fewer than 14 months in charge due to a disagreement with club's hierarchy. Former United midfielder and under-18s manager Darren Fletcher assumed charge on a caretaker basis. Another former United midfielder, Michael Carrick, was then appointed head coach for the remainder of the season. He became the first United manager, permanent or caretaker, to return to the club since Matt Busby in 1970, having managed the club in three matches in 2021.

As United were eliminated in their first match of both cup competitions for the first time since 1981–82, they played just 40 competitive matches in the season, the fewest since 1914–15, when they played 39. This was the club's first consecutive trophyless campaign since 2021–22. Despite the cup competition disappointments, the season in regards to league form was a vast improvement compared to the previous season with United finishing the season in third place, twelve places higher than they managed during the previous season, securing a return to the UEFA Champions League for the 2026–27 - which will be their first participation in Europe's elite club competition since 2023–24. Captain Bruno Fernandes also broke the Premier League 21 assists record and received the FWA Player of the Year and Premier League Player of the Season.

== Pre-season and friendlies ==
On 9 March 2025, Manchester United confirmed their participation in the Premier League Summer Series in the United States, where they would face West Ham United, Bournemouth and Everton. On 19 March 2025, the club announced a pre-season friendly against Leeds United in Stockholm, Sweden, marking the club's return to the Strawberry Arena where they lifted the UEFA Europa League trophy in 2017. On 30 April 2025, a home friendly against Fiorentina was announced to conclude the club's pre-season schedule, with the match set to mark David De Gea's first appearance at Old Trafford since departing the club in 2023.

Date	Opponents	H / A	Result F–A	Scorers	Attendance
19 July 2025	Leeds United	N	0–0		45,345
26 July 2025	West Ham United	N	2–1	Fernandes (2) 5' (pen.), 52'	82,566
30 July 2025	Bournemouth	N	4–1	Højlund 8', Dorgu 25', Diallo 53', Williams 72'	58,927
3 August 2025	Everton	N	2–2	Fernandes 19' (pen.), Mount 69'	71,000
9 August 2025	Fiorentina	H	1–1 (5–4 p)	Gosens 25' (o.g.)	67,000

== Premier League ==
The 2026–27 home kit was used for the final two matches.

United's place in the 2025–26 Premier League was confirmed on 20 April 2025. It is their 34th season in the Premier League. The league fixtures were released on 18 June 2025.

=== Matches ===
Date	Opponents	H / A	Result F–A	Scorers	Attendance	League position
17 August 2025	Arsenal	H	0–1		73,475	15th
24 August 2025	Fulham	A	1–1	Muniz 58' (o.g.)	27,512	16th
30 August 2025	Burnley	H	3–2	Cullen 27' (o.g.), Mbeumo 57', Fernandes 90+7' (pen.)	74,257	9th
14 September 2025	Manchester City	A	0–3		52,534	14th
20 September 2025	Chelsea	H	2–1	Fernandes 14', Casemiro 37'	74,124	10th
27 September 2025	Brentford	A	1–3	Šeško 26'	17,193	14th
4 October 2025	Sunderland	H	2–0	Mount 8', Šeško 31'	74,004	10th
19 October 2025	Liverpool	A	2–1	Mbeumo 2', Maguire 84'	60,337	9th
25 October 2025	Brighton & Hove Albion	H	4–2	Cunha 24', Casemiro 34', Mbeumo (2) 61', 90+6'	73,987	6th
1 November 2025	Nottingham Forest	A	2–2	Casemiro 34', Diallo 81'	30,778	8th
8 November 2025	Tottenham Hotspur	A	2–2	Mbeumo 32', De Ligt 90+6'	61,210	7th
24 November 2025	Everton	H	0–1		74,158	10th
30 November 2025	Crystal Palace	A	2–1	Zirkzee 54', Mount 63'	25,189	7th
4 December 2025	West Ham United	H	1–1	Dalot 58'	73,938	8th
8 December 2025	Wolverhampton Wanderers	A	4–1	Fernandes (2) 25', 82' (pen.), Mbeumo 51', Mount 62'	30,338	6th
15 December 2025	Bournemouth	H	4–4	Diallo 13', Casemiro 45+4', Fernandes 77', Cunha 79'	73,951	6th
21 December 2025	Aston Villa	A	1–2	Cunha 45+3'	43,157	7th
26 December 2025	Newcastle United	H	1–0	Dorgu 24'	73,996	6th
30 December 2025	Wolverhampton Wanderers	H	1–1	Zirkzee 27'	73,941	6th
4 January 2026	Leeds United	A	1–1	Cunha 65'	36,909	6th
7 January 2026	Burnley	A	2–2	Šeško (2) 50', 60'	21,047	7th
17 January 2026	Manchester City	H	2–0	Mbeumo 65', Dorgu 76'	74,004	5th
25 January 2026	Arsenal	A	3–2	Mbeumo 37', Dorgu 50', Cunha 87'	60,296	4th
1 February 2026	Fulham	H	3–2	Casemiro 19', Cunha 56', Šeško 90+4'	73,932	4th
7 February 2026	Tottenham Hotspur	H	2–0	Mbeumo 38', Fernandes 81'	73,985	4th
10 February 2026	West Ham United	A	1–1	Šeško 90+6'	62,473	4th
23 February 2026	Everton	A	1–0	Šeško 71'	52,326	4th
1 March 2026	Crystal Palace	H	2–1	Fernandes 57' (pen.), Šeško 65'	73,934	3rd
4 March 2026	Newcastle United	A	1–2	Casemiro 45+9'	52,184	3rd
15 March 2026	Aston Villa	H	3–1	Casemiro 53', Cunha 71', Šeško 81'	73,997	3rd
20 March 2026	Bournemouth	A	2–2	Fernandes 61' (pen.), Hill 71' (o.g.)	11,250	3rd
13 April 2026	Leeds United	H	1–2	Casemiro 69'	74,018	3rd
18 April 2026	Chelsea	A	1–0	Cunha 43'	39,733	3rd
27 April 2026	Brentford	H	2–1	Casemiro 11', Šeško 43'	73,773	3rd
3 May 2026	Liverpool	H	3–2	Cunha 6', Šeško 14', Mainoo 77'	74,027	3rd
9 May 2026	Sunderland	A	0–0		47,233	3rd
17 May 2026	Nottingham Forest	H	3–2	Shaw 5', Cunha 55', Mbeumo 76'	74,015	3rd
24 May 2026	Brighton & Hove Albion	A	3–0	Dorgu 33', Mbeumo 44', Fernandes 48'	31,729	3rd

=== League table ===
Pos	Team	Pld	W	D	L	GF	GA	GD	Pts	Qualification or relegation
1	Arsenal (C)	38	26	7	5	71	27	+44	85	Qualification for the Champions League league phase (Note: The Premier League gained an additional Champions League place as a result of England gaining one of the two European Performance Spots (EPS) awarded to the two associations with the highest UEFA coefficient points in 2025–26.)
2	Manchester City	38	23	9	6	77	35	+42	78	Qualification for the Champions League league phase
3	Manchester United	38	20	11	7	69	50	+19	71	Qualification for the Champions League league phase
4	Aston Villa	38	19	8	11	56	49	+7	65	Qualification for the Champions League league phase
5	Liverpool	38	17	9	12	63	53	+10	60	Qualification for the Champions League league phase

Source: Premier League
Rules for classification: 1) Points; 2) Goal difference; 3) Goals scored; 4) If the champions, relegated teams or qualified teams for UEFA competitions cannot be determined by rules 1 to 3, rules 4.1 to 4.3 are applied – 4.1) Points gained in head-to-head record between such teams; 4.2) Away goals scored in head-to-head record between such teams; 4.3) Play-offs
(C) Champions

== FA Cup ==
As a Premier League side, United entered the FA Cup in the third round and were drawn at home to Brighton & Hove Albion. They were eliminated in the third round for the first time since 2013–14, when they were beaten by Swansea City.

Date	Round	Opponents	H / A	Result F–A	Scorers	Attendance
11 January 2026	Third round	Brighton & Hove Albion	H	1–2	Šeško 85'	73,888

== EFL Cup ==
As United did not qualify for UEFA competitions, they entered the EFL Cup in the second round and were drawn away to League Two side Grimsby Town. Coming from 2–0 down, they ultimately suffered a shock defeat on penalties.

Date	Round	Opponents	H / A	Result F–A	Scorers	Attendance
27 August 2025	Second round	Grimsby Town	A	2–2 (11–12 p)	Mbeumo 75', Maguire 89'	8,647

== Squad statistics ==
No.	Pos.	Name	League		FA Cup		League Cup		Total		Discipline	
No.	Pos.	Name	Apps	Goals	Apps	Goals	Apps	Goals	Apps	Goals	Yellow card	Red card
1	GK	(Turkey) Altay Bayındır	6	0	0	0	0	0	6	0	0	0
2	DF	(Portugal) Diogo Dalot	29(5)	1	1	0	1	0	31(5)	1	5	0
3	DF	(Morocco) Noussair Mazraoui	11(9)	0	0	0	0	0	11(9)	0	3	0
4	DF	(Netherlands) Matthijs de Ligt	13	1	0	0	0(1)	0	13(1)	1	0	0
5	DF	(England) Harry Maguire	19(4)	1	0(1)	0	1	1	20(5)	2	4	1
6	DF	(Argentina) Lisandro Martínez	13(5)	0	1	0	0	0	14(5)	0	0	1
7	MF	(England) Mason Mount	12(11)	3	1	0	0(1)	0	13(12)	3	2	0
8	MF	(Portugal) Bruno Fernandes (c)	35	9	1	0	0(1)	0	36(1)	9	5	0
10	FW	(Brazil) Matheus Cunha	29(4)	10	1	0	1	0	31(4)	10	4	0
11	FW	(Netherlands) Joshua Zirkzee	5(19)	2	0(1)	0	0(1)	0	5(21)	2	3	0
12	DF	(Netherlands) Tyrell Malacia	0(3)	0	0	0	0	0	0(3)	0	0	0
13	DF	(Denmark) Patrick Dorgu	15(11)	4	1	0	1	0	17(11)	4	4	0
15	DF	(France) Leny Yoro	18(14)	0	1	0	0	0	19(14)	0	1	0
16	FW	(Ivory Coast) Amad Diallo	27(5)	2	0	0	1	0	28(5)	2	2	0
18	MF	(Brazil) Casemiro	33(1)	9	0(1)	0	0	0	33(2)	9	11	1
19	FW	(Cameroon) Bryan Mbeumo	31(2)	11	0	0	0(1)	1	31(3)	12	4	0
23	DF	(England) Luke Shaw	38	1	0	0	0	0	38	1	9	0
24	GK	(Cameroon) André Onana	0	0	0	0	1	0	1	0	0	0
25	MF	(Uruguay) Manuel Ugarte	8(14)	0	1	0	1	0	10(14)	0	1	0
26	DF	(England) Ayden Heaven	11(6)	0	0	0	1	0	12(6)	0	2	0
30	FW	(Slovenia) Benjamin Šeško	17(13)	11	1	1	1	0	19(13)	12	2	0
31	GK	(Belgium) Senne Lammens	32	0	1	0	—		33	0	0	0
32	FW	(Denmark) Chido Obi	0	0	0	0	0	0	0	0	0	0
33	DF	(England) Tyler Fredricson	0(1)	0	0	0	1	0	1(1)	0	1	0
35	DF	(Paraguay) Diego León	0	0	0	0	0	0	0	0	0	0
37	MF	(England) Kobbie Mainoo	16(12)	1	1	0	1	0	18(12)	1	2	0
38	MF	(England) Jack Fletcher	0(3)	0	0	0	0	0	0(3)	0	0	0
39	MF	(Scotland) Tyler Fletcher	0(2)	0	0	0	0	0	0(2)	0	0	0
43	MF	(England) Toby Collyer	0	0	0	0	0	0	0	0	0	0
48	MF	(Republic of Ireland) Jack Moorhouse	0	0	0	0	0	0	0	0	0	0
61	FW	(England) Shea Lacey	0(3)	0	0(1)	0	0	0	0(4)	0	2	1
70	FW	(England) Bendito Mantato	0(1)	0	0	0	0	0	0(1)	0	0	0
72	DF	(England) Godwill Kukonki	0	0	0	0	0	0	0	0	0	0
77	MF	(England) Jim Thwaites	0	0	0	0	0	0	0	0	0	0
Own goals			—	3	—	0	—	0	—	3	—	

== Transfers ==
=== In ===
Date	Pos.	Name	From	Fee	Ref.
12 June 2025	FW	(Brazil) Matheus Cunha	(England) Wolverhampton Wanderers	Undisclosed (Note: Reported as £62.5 million)	
5 July 2025	DF	(Paraguay) Diego León	(Paraguay) Cerro Porteño	Undisclosed (Note: Reported as £6 million with add-ons)	
10 July 2025	FW	(France) Enzo Kana-Biyik	(France) Le Havre	Free	
21 July 2025	FW	(Cameroon) Bryan Mbeumo	(England) Brentford	Undisclosed (Note: Reported as £65 million with £6 million in add-ons)	
29 July 2025	DF	(England) Harley Emsden-James	(England) Southampton	Free	
9 August 2025	FW	(Slovenia) Benjamin Šeško	(Germany) RB Leipzig	Undisclosed (Note: Reported as £66.3 million with £7.4 million in add-ons)	
1 September 2025	GK	(Belgium) Senne Lammens	(Belgium) Royal Antwerp	Undisclosed (Note: Reported as £18.1 million plus add-ons)	

=== Out ===
Date	Pos.	Name	To	Fee	Ref.
30 June 2025	DF	(Northern Ireland) Jonny Evans	Retired		
30 June 2025	MF	(Denmark) Christian Eriksen	Unattached (Note: Joined Wolfsburg on 10 September 2025)	Released	
30 June 2025	DF	(Sweden) Victor Lindelöf	Unattached (Note: Joined Aston Villa on 1 September 2025)	Released	
30 June 2025	GK	(England) Hubert Graczyk	(England) Wealdstone	Released	
30 June 2025	DF	(Scotland) Jack Kingdon	(Wales) Cardiff City	Released	
30 June 2025	DF	(England) Sam Murray	(England) Carlisle United	Released	
30 June 2025	GK	(England) Tom Myles	(England) Rochdale	Released	
30 June 2025	DF	(England) James Nolan	(England) Marine	Released	
30 June 2025	GK	(England) Tom Wooster	(England) West Ham United	Released	
30 August 2025	FW	(Argentina) Alejandro Garnacho	(England) Chelsea	Undisclosed (Note: Reported as £40 million)	
1 September 2025	FW	(Brazil) Antony	(Spain) Real Betis	Undisclosed (Note: Reported as £19.06 million with £2.59 million in add-ons)	
1 September 2025	MF	(Ukraine) Zach Baumann	(England) Norwich City	Undisclosed (Note: Reported as a free transfer with performance-based add-ons)	
17 January 2026	FW	(England) Sam Mather	(Turkey) Kayserispor	Undisclosed	
30 January 2026	FW	(England) Joe Hugill	(Scotland) Kilmarnock	Undisclosed	
31 January 2026	DF	(England) Rhys Bennett	(England) Fleetwood Town	Undisclosed	

=== Loan out ===
Date	Pos.	Name	To	Until	Ref.
10 July 2025	DF	(England) Sonny Aljofree	(England) Notts County	3 January 2026	
15 July 2025	DF	(England) Habeeb Ogunneye	(England) Newport County	14 January 2026	
19 July 2025	FW	(England) Joe Hugill	(England) Barnet	14 January 2026	
22 July 2025	GK	(England) Elyh Harrison	(England) Shrewsbury Town	15 January 2026	
1 August 2025	MF	(Republic of Ireland) Jack Moorhouse	(England) Leyton Orient	2 February 2026	
1 August 2025	FW	(England) Ethan Wheatley	(England) Northampton Town	12 January 2026	
15 August 2025	MF	(England) Toby Collyer	(England) West Bromwich Albion	1 January 2026	
29 August 2025	DF	(Scotland) Louis Jackson	(England) Solihull Moors	8 January 2026	
1 September 2025	DF	(England) Harry Amass	(England) Sheffield Wednesday	5 January 2026	
10 July 2025	FW	(France) Enzo Kana-Biyik	(Switzerland) Lausanne-Sport	30 June 2026	
17 July 2025	MF	(England) Dan Gore	(England) Rotherham United	30 June 2026	
23 July 2025	FW	(England) Marcus Rashford	(Spain) Barcelona	30 June 2026	
28 July 2025	GK	(Czech Republic) Radek Vítek	(England) Bristol City	30 June 2026	
31 August 2025	FW	(England) Ethan Williams	(Scotland) Falkirk	30 June 2026	
1 September 2025	FW	(Denmark) Rasmus Højlund	(Italy) Napoli	30 June 2026	
1 September 2025	FW	(England) Jadon Sancho	(England) Aston Villa	30 June 2026	
1 September 2025	FW	(England) Ethan Ennis	(England) Fleetwood Town	30 June 2026	
12 September 2025	GK	(Cameroon) André Onana	(Turkey) Trabzonspor	30 June 2026	
24 January 2026	DF	(England) Harry Amass	(England) Norwich City	30 June 2026	
30 January 2026	MF	(England) Toby Collyer	(England) Hull City	30 June 2026	
2 February 2026	FW	(Wales) Gabriele Biancheri	(England) Rotherham United	30 June 2026	
2 February 2026	FW	(Gibraltar) James Scanlon	(England) Swindon Town	30 June 2026	
2 February 2026	FW	(England) Ethan Wheatley	(England) Bradford City	30 June 2026	
2 February 2026	MF	(Republic of Ireland) Jacob Devaney	(Scotland) St Mirren	30 June 2026	
3 February 2026	MF	(Mali) Sékou Koné	(Switzerland) Lausanne-Sport	30 June 2026	

== Statistics ==
=== Attendances from season to season ===
Includes all competitive home, away and neutral-site matches.
Last updated on 1 July 2026.

Season	Game type	Premier League total	Premier League matches	Premier League average	FA Cup total	FA Cup matches	FA Cup average	EFL Cup total	EFL Cup matches	EFL Cup average	Total	Matches	Average
2025–26	Home	1,405,506	19	73,974	73,888	1	73,888	0	0	—	1,479,394	20	73,970
2025–26	Away	763,420	19	40,180	0	0	—	8,647	1	8,647	772,067	20	38,603
2025–26	Neutral	0	0	—	0	0	—	0	0	—	0	0	—
2025–26	Total	2,168,926	38	57,077	73,888	1	73,888	8,647	1	8,647	2,251,461	40	56,287

== See also ==
- 2025–26 Manchester United W.F.C. season
