= Enzo Kana-Biyik =

French footballer (born 2007)

Personal information
- Date of birth: 8 January 2007 (age 19)
- Place of birth: Paris, France
- Height: 1.89 m (6 ft 2 in)
- Position: Forward

Team information
- Current team: Manchester United U21

Youth career
- 2013–2017: FC Epinay Athlético
- 2017–2021: Brunoy
- 2021–2022: CS Brétigny
- 2022–2025: Le Havre

Senior career*
Years	Team	Apps	(Gls)
2024–2025	Le Havre	0	(0)
2025–	Manchester United	0	(0)
2025–2026	→ Lausanne-Sport (loan)	21	(1)

International career^{‡}
2025	France U18	7	(0)
- * Club domestic league appearances and goals as of 26 May 2026 ‡ National team caps and goals as of 00:19, 11 July 2025 (UTC)

Enzo Makalele Assane Kana-Biyik (born 8 January 2007), is a French professional footballer who plays as a forward for the Under-21 squad of Premier League club Manchester United.

== Club career ==
=== Le Havre ===
Kana-Biyik spent his youth career at Ligue 1 side Le Havre. Kana-Biyik scored nine goals in 18 games for Le Havre's Under-19s team in the 2024–25 season. He was also named on the bench for the first team on two occasions.

=== Manchester United ===
On 10 July 2025, it was announced that Kana-Biyik had signed for Premier League club Manchester United.

==== 2025–26: Loan to Lausanne-Sport ====
After signing for Manchester United, he was sent straight out to Swiss Super League club Lausanne-Sport.

== International career ==
Enzo is eligible to represent both Cameroon through his father and France where he was born. Kana-Biyik was called up to the France under-19 in 2025.

== Style of play ==
Kana-Biyik operates primarily as a striker, though he has the versatility to drop into deeper positions or drift wide. His game is built around physical strength, off-the-ball movement, and a strong work ethic-traits, in the style of Anthony Martial.

== Personal life ==
Kana-Biyik comes from a footballing family. He is the son of André Kana-Biyik. His older brother, Jean-Armel Kana-Biyik, was also a footballer, who played for the Cameroon national team. He has a younger brother, Lorenzo Kana-Biyik, who plays for the under-17 team of Paris Saint-Germain. Enzo is also the cousin of footballer Emilio Omam-Biyik, and a nephew to François Omam-Biyik.

== Career statistics ==
As of match played 11 July 2025

Appearances and goals by club, season and competition
Club	Season	League			National cup		League cup		Continental		Other		Total	
Club	Season	Division	Apps	Goals	Apps	Goals	Apps	Goals	Apps	Goals	Apps	Goals	Apps	Goals
Le Havre	2024–25	Ligue 1	0	0	0	0	0	0	0	0	0	0	0	0
Manchester United	2025–26	Premier League	0	0	0	0	0	0	0	0	0	0	0	0
Lausanne-Sport (loan)	2025–26	Swiss Super League	13	1	2	0	0	0	2	0	0	0	17	1
Career total			13	1	2	0	0	0	2	0	0	0	17	1
