= Diego León (footballer, born 2007) =

Paraguayan footballer (born 2007)

Personal information
- Full name: Diego Basilio León Blanco
- Date of birth: 3 April 2007 (age 19)
- Place of birth: Colonia Yguazú, Paraguay
- Height: 1.77 m (5 ft 10 in)
- Positions: Left-back; left wing-back

Team information
- Current team: Manchester United
- Number: 35

Youth career
- –2023: Cerro Porteño

Senior career*
Years	Team	Apps	(Gls)
2024–2025	Cerro Porteño	31	(3)
2025–	Manchester United	0	(0)

International career^{‡}
2025–	Paraguay U20	9	(1)
2025–	Paraguay	1	(0)
- * Club domestic league appearances and goals as of 9 May 2025 ‡ National team caps and goals as of 14 October 2025

Diego Basilio León Blanco (born 3 April 2007) commonly known as Diego León, is a Paraguayan professional footballer who plays as a left-back and left wing-back for Premier League club Manchester United and the Paraguay national team.

== Early life ==
León was born on 3 April 2007 in Colonia Yguazú, Paraguay, as the youngest of nine children. He is the son of Brígida Blanco.

== Club career ==
=== Cerro Porteño ===
León began his career with Cerro Porteño, making his senior debut on 2 August 2024, in a 1–0 win over Sportivo Ameliano, scoring the winning goal.

=== Manchester United ===
It was announced on 11 January 2025 that León would sign for Premier League club Manchester United in the summer window. On 5 July 2025, Manchester United confirmed the signing of León.

== International career ==
León made his debut in the senior national team on 14 October 2025, coming on as a substitute against South Korea.

== Style of play ==
He has been described as "one of the great promises of Paraguayan football".

== Career statistics ==
=== Club ===
As of match played 4 November 2025

Appearances, goals and assists by club, season and competition
Club	Season	League			National cup		League cup		Continental		Other		Total	
Club	Season	Division	Apps	Goals	Apps	Goals	Apps	Goals	Apps	Goals	Apps	Goals	Apps	Goals
Cerro Porteño	2024	Paraguayan Primera División	19	2	0	0	—		0	0	—		19	2
Cerro Porteño	2025	Paraguayan Primera División	12	1	0	0	—		2 (Note: Appearances in Copa Libertadores)	1	—		14	2
Cerro Porteño	Total		31	3	0	0	—		2	1	—		33	4
Manchester United U21	2025–26	—			—		—		—		2 (Note: Appearances in EFL Trophy)	0	2	0
Manchester United	2025–26	Premier League	0	0	0	0	0	0	—		—		0	0
Career total			31	3	0	0	0	0	2	1	2	0	35	4

== Honours ==
=== Individual ===
- Player of the Month in Paraguayan Primera Division (July) according to APF: 2024
- Included in the Top 10 Young Revelations of the Year according to CIES: 2024
- Best U-18 Footballer in the World (4th) according to CIES: 2024
