= Harry Amass =

English footballer (born 2007)

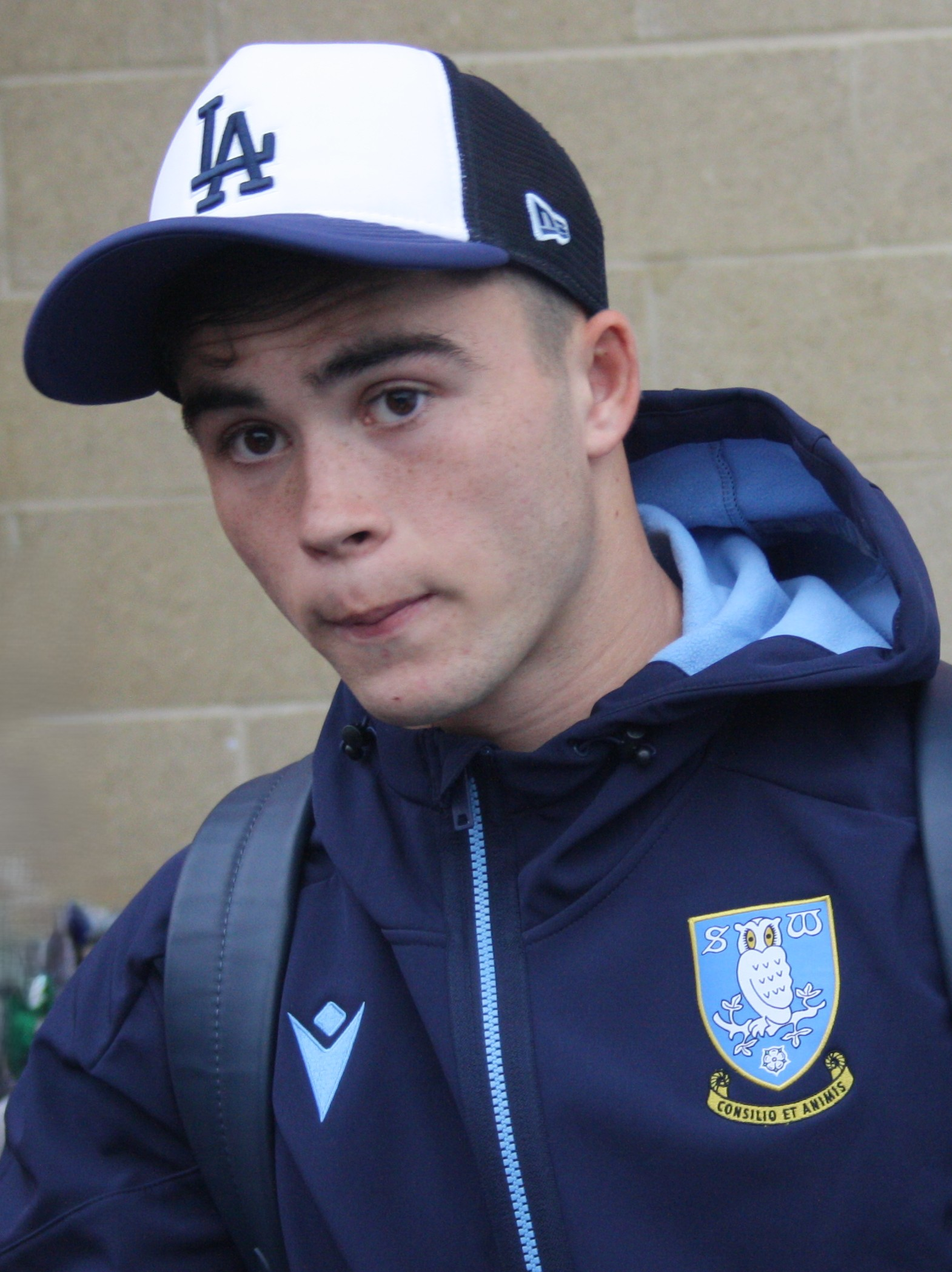
- Amass with Sheffield Wednesday in 2025

Personal information
- Full name: Harry John Amass
- Date of birth: 16 March 2007 (age 19)
- Place of birth: London, England
- Height: 1.81 m (5 ft 11 in)
- Position: Left-back

Team information
- Current team: Manchester United
- Number: 41

Youth career
- –2023: Watford
- 2023–2025: Manchester United

Senior career*
Years	Team	Apps	(Gls)
2025–	Manchester United	5	(0)
2025–2026	→ Sheffield Wednesday (loan)	21	(1)
2026	→ Norwich City (loan)	1	(0)

International career^{‡}
2022	England U15	1	(0)
2022–2023	England U16	12	(0)
2023–2024	England U17	9	(0)
2024–2025	England U18	8	(0)
2025–	England U19	5	(0)
2026–	England U20	4	(1)
- * Club domestic league appearances and goals as of 09:30, 27 January 2026 (UTC) ‡ National team caps and goals as of 13:24, 17 November 2026 (UTC)

Harry John Amass (/əˈmæs/, uh-MASS; born 16 March 2007) is an English professional footballer who plays as a left-back for Premier League club Manchester United. He is an England youth international.

Amass joined Manchester United's youth system in 2023, from Watford. He won the Jimmy Murphy Young Player of the Year award in the 2024–25 season. Since making his first-team debut for United in March 2025, he has had loan spells at Sheffield Wednesday and Norwich City.

== Club career ==
=== Early career ===
Having joined Watford at the age of nine, Amass was included in a first-team squad for the first time in January 2023, at the age of fifteen, when he was named on the bench for an FA Cup third-round fixture against fellow Championship side Reading, though he did not feature in Watford's 2–0 away loss on 7 January.

=== Manchester United ===
In March 2023, English newspaper The Evening Standard reported that Premier League side Manchester United were close to agreeing a deal with Amass, beating rivals Chelsea to the player's signature. Watford offered Amass a new deal the following month, but in June of the same year, it was reported that a four-year deal had been agreed with Manchester United, with the clubs to agree on a compensation fee for the move. This move was confirmed by Manchester United in August 2023.

==== 2024–2026: Debut season and loan spells ====
Amass was called up to first-team training with Manchester United for the first time in February 2024. On 7 April that year, he got a first spot on the bench for United against Liverpool, though did not play.

On 16 March 2025, his 18th birthday, he was named in the match day squad to face Leicester City in the Premier League at the King Power Stadium and was brought on in the 69th minute to make his senior Manchester United debut. On 13 April 2025, Amass made his first senior start for Manchester United, against Newcastle United in the Premier League.

In May 2025, he won the Jimmy Murphy Young Player of the Year award for the 2024–25 season.

On 1 September 2025, Amass joined Championship club Sheffield Wednesday on loan until January 2026. He made his Wednesday debut, starting the Championship game at home to Bristol City, where he scored an own-goal in an eventual 3–0 defeat. He scored his first senior goal away to Southampton, scoring from range having run through the middle and driving his shot into the far right corner of the net. He won back-to-back Wednesday player of the month awards for November and December, picking up an 82% share of the vote for November. His loan spell expired on 5 January 2026, following the game against Queens Park Rangers having played 21 times and scoring once.

On 24 January 2026, Amass joined EFL Championship club Norwich City on loan until the end of the season. He made his debut against Coventry City two days later, coming off the bench in the 2–1 win. After the following game, manager Philippe Clement revealed Amass faced a lengthy lay-off after picking up an injury in training.

== International career ==
Amass has played youth international football for England at under-15, under-16, under-17, under-18, under-19 and under-20 levels.

Amass was called up to the England under-16 squad for a UEFA Development Tournament in Cyprus in February 2023. He helped the side win the tournament, beating hosts Cyprus, as well as Scotland and Denmark.

On 20 May 2024, Amass was included in the England squad for the 2024 UEFA European Under-17 Championship. He came off the bench as a substitute during the quarter-final and scored his penalty as England were eliminated by Italy on penalties.

On 4 September 2024, Amass made his England under-18 debut against Portugal in Limoges.

== Style of play ==
Harry Amass is known to be a tough tackler. He has been quoted, "you've just got to show your aggressive side – you might be young, smaller than the opponent but you have to show you are aggressive, and don't back down". Besides from his tough tackling his technical qualities allow him to excel in attacking phases of the game as well.

== Career statistics ==
=== Club ===
As of match played 21 October 2026

Appearances and goals by club, season and competition
Club	Season	League			FA Cup		EFL Cup		Europe		Other		Total	
Club	Season	Division	Apps	Goals	Apps	Goals	Apps	Goals	Apps	Goals	Apps	Goals	Apps	Goals
Manchester United U21	2024–25	—	—		—		—		—		3 (Note: Appearances in EFL Trophy)	0	3	0
Manchester United	2024–25	Premier League	5	0	0	0	0	0	2 (Note: Appearances in UEFA Europa League)	0	0	0	7	0
Manchester United	2025–26	Premier League	0	0	0	0	0	0	—		—		0	0
Manchester United	2026–27	Premier League	0	0	0	0	0	0	2 (Note: Appearances in UEFA Champions League)	0	—		2	0
Manchester United	Total		5	0	0	0	0	0	4	0	0	0	9	0
Sheffield Wednesday (loan)	2025–26	Championship	21	1	—		0	0	—		—		21	1
Norwich City (loan)	2025–26	Championship	1	0	0	0	—		—		—		1	0
Career total			27	1	0	0	0	0	4	0	3	0	34	1

== Honours ==
Manchester United U18

- U18 Premier League
  - National Final: 2023–24
  - North Division: 2023–24
- U18 Premier League Cup: 2023–24

Manchester United

- UEFA Europa League runner-up: 2024–25

Individual

- Jimmy Murphy Young Player of the Year: 2024–25
