= Bendito Mantato =

English footballer (born 2008)

Personal information
- Full name: Bendito Boanova Mantato
- Date of birth: 25 January 2008 (age 18)
- Place of birth: Manchester, England
- Height: 5 ft 11 in (1.80 m)
- Positions: Forward; full back

Team information
- Current team: Manchester United
- Number: 70

Youth career
- 2017–2025: Manchester United

Senior career*
Years	Team	Apps	(Gls)
2025–	Manchester United	1	(0)

International career^{‡}
2023	England U15	4	(0)
2023–2024	England U16	6	(0)
2024–2025	England U17	12	(0)
2025–	England U18	5	(0)
- * Club domestic league appearances and goals as of 21:41, 30 December 2025 (UTC) ‡ National team caps and goals as of 01:41, 19 November 2025 (UTC)

Bendito Boanova Mantato (born 25 January 2008) is an English professional footballer who plays as a forward or a fullback for Manchester United.

== Club career ==
Mantato joined Manchester United aged nine, in 2017. Since then, he has progressed through various youth levels, and is currently part of the U18 team. On 28 February 2025, Mantato scored a 99th minute winner against Arsenal in the FA Youth Cup quarterfinals to help United win the game 3–2.

Mantato made his senior debut for Manchester United on 30 December 2025, coming on as a substitute for Manuel Ugarte in the 75th minute of a Premier League game against Wolverhampton Wanderers. Manchester United went on to draw the game 1–1.

== International career ==
Of Angolan and Congolese roots, Mantato is eligible to play for the Angola national team and DR Congo national team. However, born in England, he has chosen to represent the Three Lions at youth level, making appearances for the U15, U16, and U17 teams.

On 3 September 2025, Mantato made his England U18 debut during a 3–1 win over Uzbekistan.

On 21 October 2025, Mantato was included in the England squad for the 2025 FIFA U-17 World Cup. He provided an assist for a goal by Luca Williams-Barnett during a group stage victory over Haiti. Mantato also started in their round of sixteen elimination by Austria.

== Style of play ==
Often likened to Bukayo Saka for his playstyle, Mantato has been described as a player who "has bundles of pace, plays with high intensity, and whose dribbling is a huge asset" and as a "versatile player with impressive size for his age and a strong technical base".

== Career statistics ==
As of match played 30 December 2025

Appearances and goals by club, season and competition
Club	Season	League			FA Cup		EFL Cup		Europe		Other		Total	
Club	Season	Division	Apps	Goals	Apps	Goals	Apps	Goals	Apps	Goals	Apps	Goals	Apps	Goals
Manchester United	2025–26	Premier League	1	0	0	0	0	0	—		—		1	0
Career total			1	0	0	0	0	0	0	0	0	0	1	0
