= Oğuzhan Bıyık =

Turkish footballer

Personal information
- Date of birth: September 28, 1986 (age 40)
- Height: 1.79 m (5 ft 10 in)
- Position: Midfielder

Team information
- Current team: TSG Backnang

Youth career
- VfB Stuttgart
- TSG Backnang

Senior career*
Years	Team	Apps	(Gls)
2004–2008	1899 Hoffenheim II	62	(3)
2004–2005	1899 Hoffenheim	2	(0)
2008–2009	1. FK Příbram	12	(1)
2009–2010	SG Sonnenhof Großaspach	31	(0)
2010–2011	SGV Freiberg	27	(4)
2011	BFC Türkiyemspor	6	(0)
2012–	TSG Backnang		
- * Club domestic league appearances and goals

Oğuzhan Bıyık (born September 28, 1986 in Germany) is a Turkish footballer. He currently plays for TSG Backnang.
