= Diego de León =

Diego de León may refer to:

- Diego de León, 1st Count of Belascoáin (1807–1841), Spanish military figure
- Diego de León (Madrid Metro), a station of the Madrid Metro
