= Jean-Armel Kana-Biyik =

French-born Cameroonian footballer (born 1989)

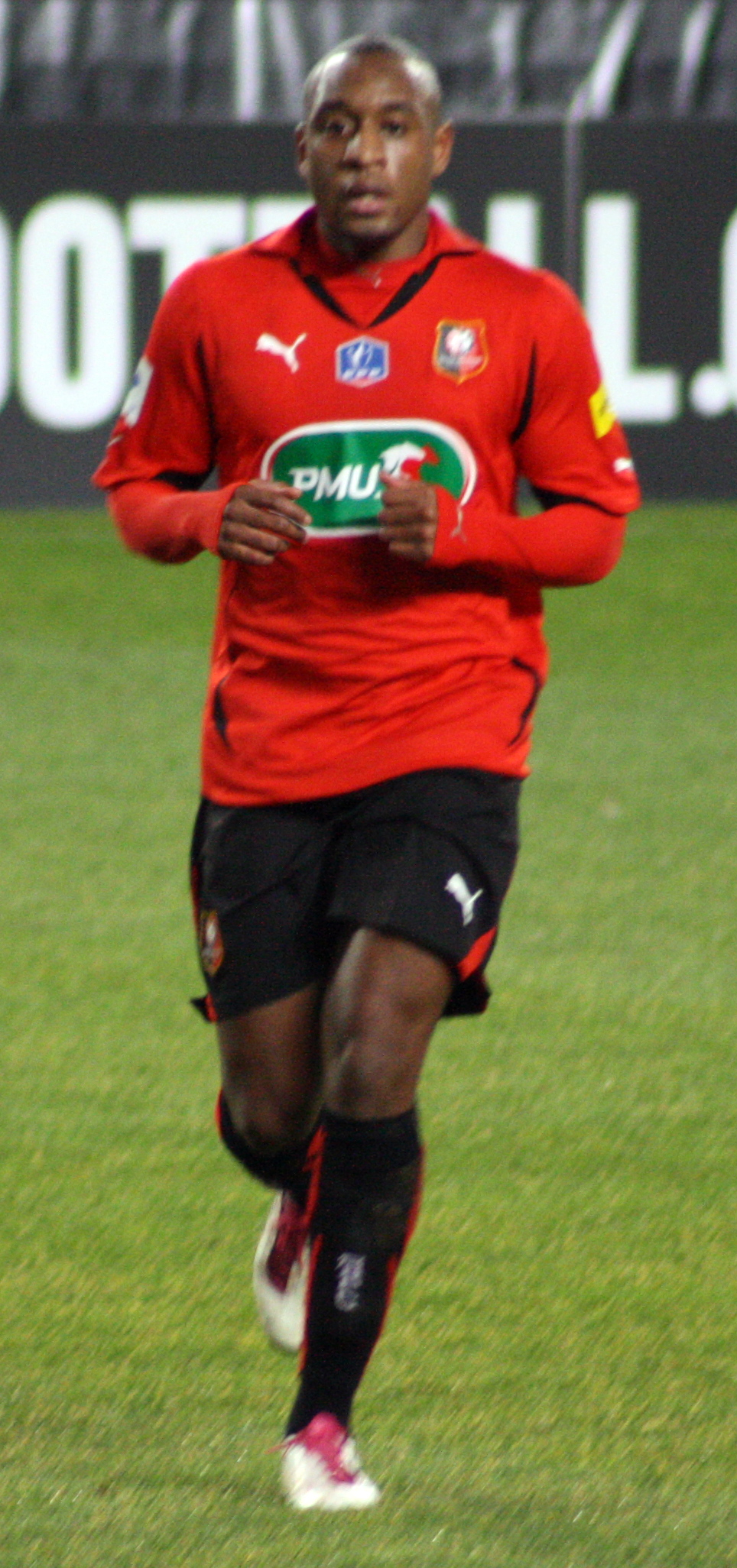

Personal information
- Date of birth: 3 July 1989 (age 37)
- Place of birth: Metz, France
- Height: 1.83 m (6 ft 0 in)
- Position: Defender

Youth career
- 1995–2001: A.S. de Montivilliers
- 2001–2004: CSS Municipaux Havre
- 2004–2008: Le Havre

Senior career*
Years	Team	Apps	(Gls)
2008–2010	Le Havre	42	(0)
2010	Rennes B	2	(0)
2010–2015	Rennes	113	(3)
2015–2016	Toulouse	28	(3)
2016–2019	Kayserispor	85	(1)
2019–2021	Gaziantep	50	(3)
2022	Metz	10	(0)

International career
2009	France U21	5	(1)
2012–2019	Cameroon	6	(0)
- * Club domestic league appearances and goals as of 21 May 2022

Jean-Armel Kana-Biyik (born 3 July 1989) is a professional footballer who plays as a defender. Born in France, he represented Cameroon at international level.

== Club career ==
Kana-Biyik began his career at Le Havre in 2005 and was promoted to the first team in 2008, he made his debut on 22 February 2008 against Dijon in Ligue 2. On 21 June 2010, Kana-Biyik signed a four-year deal with Rennes. He joined Toulouse on 10 January 2015 on a two-and-a-half-year contract.

In August 2016, Kana-Biyik left Toulouse to join Süper Lig side Kayserispor. Kana-Biyik had made over 150 Ligue 1 appearances before moving to Turkey.

In July 2019, Kana-Biyik joined Gazişehir Gaziantep. In January 2022, he signed for his hometown club Metz.

== International career ==
Kana-Biyik was a former member of the France under-21 team. In 2012 decided to play for Cameroon at senior level. He retired from international duty with Cameroon in September 2019, having made 6 appearances.

== Personal life ==
He is the son of André Kana-Biyik. His younger brothers, Enzo and Lorenzo, are also footballers, playing for Manchester United and Paris Saint Germain, respectively.

== Honours ==
Le Havre

- Ligue 2: 2007–08
