= 2021–22 FA Youth Cup =

Tournament details
- Teams: 610

Final positions
- Champions: Manchester United (11th Title)
- Runners-up: Nottingham Forest (1st Runner Up Finish)

Tournament statistics
- Top goal scorer: (Argentina) Alejandro Garnacho Manchester United (7 Goals)

The 2021–22 FA Youth Cup was the 70th edition of the FA Youth Cup.

The competition consisted of several rounds and was preceded by a qualifying competition, starting with two preliminary rounds which was followed by three qualifying rounds for non-League teams. The Football League teams entered the draw thereafter, with League One and League Two teams entered in the first round proper, and Premier League and Championship teams entered in the third round proper.

610 teams were accepted into the FA Youth Cup.

== Calendar ==
Round	Matches played from	Matches	Clubs	New entries
Preliminary round	30 August 2021	233	610 → 377	466
First round qualifying	13 September 2021	133	377 → 244	33
Second round qualifying	27 September 2021	78	244 → 166	23
Third round qualifying	11 October 2021	39	166 → 127	
First round	6 November 2021	42	127 → 85	45
Second round	20 November 2021	21	85 → 64	
Third round	11 December 2021	32	64 → 32	43
Fourth round	15 January 2022	16	32 → 16	
Fifth round	5 February 2022	8	16 → 8	
Quarter-finals	26 February 2022	4	8 → 4	
Semi-finals	4 April 2022	2	4 → 2	
Final	11 May 2022	1	2 → 1	

== Competition proper ==
=== First round ===
The League One and League Two teams enter the first round Proper with the 39 non league winners from the qualifying rounds joining them for this round. Only Barrow AFC, Crawley Town, and Wycombe Wanderers did not participate from League One and League Two because the three did not apply. Hartlepool United vs. Bolton Wanderers was initially drawn, but Hartlepool withdrew from the tournament, granting Bolton a bye to the next round.

26 October 2021	Carlisle United (4)	4–4 (a.e.t.) (3–5 p)	Oldham Athletic (4)	Carlisle
19:00 GMT	Fishburn 5', 104'; Watt 59'; Ellis 78'	Report	Chapman 45+1'; Simms 61'; Southerington 90+6'; Atkinson 99'	Stadium: Brunton Park; Attendance: 327; Referee: Graeme Hopper
	Penalties
	Fishburn (penalty missed); Hardy (penalty scored); Kilsby (penalty scored); Carr (penalty scored)		(penalty scored) Simms; (penalty scored) Moore; (penalty scored) Atkinson; (penalty scored) Kilner; (penalty scored) Modi

26 October 2021	Crewe Alexandra (3)	3–0	Grimsby Town (5)	Crewe
19:00 GMT	Salisbury 27', 43'; Tabiner 63'	Report		Stadium: Gresty Road; Attendance: 411; Referee: Zharir Mustafa

26 October 2021	Bristol Rovers (4)	0–4	Exeter City (4)	Bristol
19:00 GMT		Report	Billington 3'; Hanson 32'; Cox 54', 86'	Stadium: Memorial Stadium; Attendance: 228; Referee: George Enever

26 October 2021	Plymouth Argyle (3)	2–1	Mangotsfield United (8)	Plymouth
19:00 GMT	Waruih 17' (pen.); Salawu 63'	Report	Crosbie 40'	Stadium: Home Park; Attendance: 284; Referee: Timothy Burley

27 October 2021	Accrington Stanley (3)	4–3 (a.e.t.)	Wigan Athletic (3)	Accrington
19:00 GMT	Adekoya 30', 40'; Trickett 51'; Lawton 110'	Report	Lomax 62'; Welsh 73'; Sze 84'	Stadium: Wham Stadium; Attendance: 375; Referee: Paul Roots

28 October 2021	Ipswich Town (3)	7–1	Winslow United (10)	Ipswich
19:00 GMT	Boatswain 18', 47'; Osbourne 23'; Manly 27', 82'; Chirewa 38', 62'	Report	Brown 21'	Stadium: Portman Road; Attendance: 258; Referee: Bradley Mingay

28 October 2021	Hayes & Yeading (7)	0–1	Corinthian-Casuals (7)	Hayes
19:00 GMT		Report	Ince 90+5'	Stadium: Skyrex Community Stadium; Attendance: 123; Referee: Matthew Norton

1 November 2021	Walsall (4)	1–1 (a.e.t.) (0–3 p)	Port Vale (4)	Walsall
19:00 GMT	Christofaro 20'	Report	Jones 51'	Stadium: Bescot Stadium; Attendance: 358; Referee: Neil Pratt
	Penalties
	Sawyers (penalty missed); Shaw (penalty missed); Onabirekhanlen (penalty missed)		(penalty scored) Jones; (penalty missed) McDermott; (penalty scored) McFarlane; (penalty scored) Lomax

2 November 2021	AFC Wimbledon (3)	7–0	Woking (5)	Wimbledon
19:00 GMT	Bartley 24', 26'; Campbell 34'; Williams 44', 45+2'; Lock 60'; Stevens 90'	Report		Stadium: Plough Lane; Attendance: 559; Referee: Harrison Blair

2 November 2021	Guiseley (6)	2–1	Rochdale (4)	Guiseley
19:00 GMT	Stones 21', 90+3'		Thomas 40' (pen.)	Stadium: Nethermoor Park; Attendance: 295; Referee: Jack Hall

2 November 2021	Rotherham United (3)	3–0	Boldmere St. Michaels (9)	Rotherham
19:00 GMT	Hatton 14'; McGuckin 61' (pen.); Durose 90'	Report		Stadium: New York Stadium; Attendance: 243; Referee: Lee Hible

2 November 2021	Sutton United (4)	3–2	Gillingham (3)	Sutton
19:00 GMT	Mutale 45+1', 46'; Tanner 90+3'	Report	Gbode 14'; Hutcheon 16'	Stadium: Gander Green Lane; Attendance: 187; Referee: Nicholas Metcalfe

2 November 2021	Milton Keynes Dons (3)	5–0	Maccabi London Lions (10)	Milton Keynes
19:00 GMT	Johnson 6'; Anker 54', 90+1', 90+3'; Boyce 73'	Report		Stadium: Stadium MK; Attendance: 597; Referee: Jack Bloxham

2 November 2021	Swindon Town (4)	5–1	Winchester City (8)	Gloucester
19:00 GMT	Kern 52'; Francis 59', 60', 54'; Wynn-Davis 78'	Report	Elms 90'	Stadium: New Meadow Park; Attendance: 105; Referee: Matthew Rushton

3 November 2021	Wimborne Town (7)	0–7	Forest Green Rovers (4)	Wimborne
19:00 GMT			Oyebamiji 22', 51'; McLaughlin 35', 45+1', 78'; Joseph 49'; Dunn 72'	Stadium: New Cuthbury; Attendance: 141; Referee: Niall Clinton

3 November 2021	Cheltenham Town (3)	3–0	North Leigh (8)	Cheltenham
19:00 GMT	Guinan 9', 31'; Armitage 68'	Report		Stadium: Whaddon Road; Attendance: 339; Referee: Andrew Sheppard

3 November 2021	Newport County (4)	4–3	Torquay United (5)	Newport
19:00 GMT	Karadogan 4'; Bright 19', 78'; Ryan-Phillips 26'	Report	Quinn 16' (pen.); Brooks 54', 86'	Stadium: Park Spytty; Attendance: 226; Referee: Andrew Hobbs

3 November 2021	Erith Town (9)	0–1	Portsmouth (3)	Erith
19:00 GMT		Report	Bridgman 50'	Stadium: Erith Stadium; Attendance: 444; Referee: Scott Rudd

3 November 2021	Cray Valley Paper Mills (8)	0–1	Aldershot Town (5)	Eltham
19:00 GMT		Report	Evans 40'	Stadium: Artic Stadium; Attendance: 192; Referee: Jamaal Horne

3 November 2021	King's Lynn Town (5)	0–3	Northampton Town (4)	King's Lynn
19:00 GMT		Report	Connor 29', 33', 60'	Stadium: The Walks; Attendance: 228; Referee: Lee Hartley

3 November 2021	Oxford United (3)	4–0	Sutton Common Rovers (8)	Oxford
19:00 GMT	Smith 1'; O'Donkor 12', 45'; Johnson 59'	Report		Stadium: Court Place Farm; Attendance: 130; Referee: Thomas Holden

3 November 2021	Brantham Athletic (9)	2–4	Stevenage (4)	Brantham
19:00 GMT	Pratt 3'; Carpenter 66'	Report	Bustamante 40'; Johnson 45', 80', 83'	Stadium: Brantham Leisure Centre; Attendance: 255; Referee: Michael Robertson-Tant

3 November 2021	City of Liverpool (8)	0–1 (a.e.t.)	Morecambe (3)	Warrington
19:00 GMT		Report	Nicholson 96'	Stadium: Cantilever Park; Attendance: 130; Referee: Luis Griffiths

3 November 2021	Fleetwood Town (3)	3–3 (a.e.t.) (4–3 p)	Tranmere Rovers (4)	Fleetwood
19:00 GMT	Thompson-Pempreh 53'; King 83'; Clarke 105+1'	Report	Taylor 32'; Bamgbose 73'; King 105'	Stadium: Highbury Stadium; Attendance: 308; Referee: Shaun Taylor
	Penalties
	Johnson (penalty scored); Trialist A. (penalty scored); King (penalty scored); Leggett (penalty missed); Clarke (penalty scored)		(penalty scored) Timlin; (penalty scored) Dywer; (penalty missed) Capps; (penalty missed) Jones; (penalty scored) Haley

3 November 2021	Aylestone Park (10)	4–4 (a.e.t.) (3–1 p)	Lincoln City (3)	Aylestone
19:00 GMT	Buckingham 54'; Kilburn 72'; Nuttall 90'; Scott O'Brien (footballer) O'Brien 116'	Report	Gallagher 16'; Draper 48' (pen.); Makama 90+2'; Brooks 114'	Stadium: Aylestone Park; Attendance: 503; Referee: Sam Wesson
	Penalties
	Stokes (penalty scored); Buckingham (penalty scored); Chikuza (penalty missed)		(penalty missed) Cann; (penalty missed) Brooks; (penalty missed) Makama; (penalty scored) Dale

3 November 2021	Shrewsbury Town (3)	0–1	Scunthorpe United (4)	Shrewsbury
19:00 GMT		Report	Moore-Billam 7'	Stadium: New Meadow; Attendance: 130; Referee: James Lunn

3 November 2021	Reading City (9)	1–0	Gosport Borough (7)	Reading
19:00 GMT	Balogun 64' (pen.)	Report		Stadium: The Rivermoor; Attendance: 126; Referee: Alan Cresswell

3 November 2021	South Shields (7)	1–3	Stockport County (5)	South Shields
19:00 GMT	Cresdee 90+3'	Report	McFadyen 13'; Holding 46'; Tanswell 82'	Stadium: Mariner's Park; Attendance: 293; Referee: Graeme Hopper

4 November 2021	Bugbrooke St Michaels (9)	1–8	Colchester United (4)	Bugbrooke
19:00 GMT	King 40'	Report	Tovide 2', 63'; Bennett 15', 50'; Price 18'; Drakes-Thomas 33'; Brown 40'; McFadden 81'	Stadium: Birds Close; Attendance: 295; Referee: Joe Woolmer

4 November 2021	Worthing (7)	1–3	Charlton Athletic (3)	Worthing
19:00 GMT	O'Brien 54' (pen.)	Report 1 Report 2	Adigun 29'; Kanu 34'; Leaburn 40'	Stadium: Woodside Road; Attendance: 485; Referee: Will Briers

4 November 2021	Leatherhead (7)	1–3	Leyton Orient (4)	Leatherhead
19:00 GMT	Unknown 32'	Report	Clements 41'; Pegrum 47'; Smith-Kouassi 90+1'	Stadium: Fetcham Grove; Referee: Valentine Anekwe

4 November 2021	AFC Blackpool (10)	1–2	Harrogate Town (4)	Blackpool
19:00 GMT	White 30'	Report	O'Boyle 22'; Wilson 66'	Stadium: The Mechanics Stadium; Attendance: 198; Referee: Abid Hussain

4 November 2021	Sunderland (3)	0–2	Bradford City (4)	Hetton-le-Hole
19:00 GMT		Report	Wilson 13'; Youmbi 22'	Stadium: Eppleton Colliery Welfare Ground; Referee: Martin Conroy

4 November 2021	Salford City (4)	3–0	Blyth Spartans (6)	Salford
19:00 GMT	Pedro 8'; Walsh 26', 90+2'	Report		Stadium: Moor Lane; Attendance: 171; Referee: Simon Kells

4 November 2021	Long Eaton United (9)	0–2	Rugby Town (9)	Long Eaton
19:00 GMT		Report	Platts 22'; Stone 90+8' (pen.)	Stadium: Grange Park; Attendance: 145; Referee: Daniel Smith

4 November 2021	Boston United (6)	2–5 (a.e.t.)	Mansfield Town (4)	Boston
19:00 GMT	Foster 25'; Robson 76'	Report	Pitts 32'; Deakin 56', 97', 102'; Hurdis 120+2'	Stadium: The Quadrant; Attendance: 537; Referee: Andrew Hitchcox

4 November 2021	Southend United (5)	1–1 (a.e.t.) (4–5 p)	Cambridge United (3)	Southend-on-Sea
19:00 GMT	Amir 84' (pen.)	Report	McConnell 77'	Stadium: Roots Hall; Attendance: 210; Referee: Rhys Battye
	Penalties
	Burkey (penalty missed); Garzon (penalty scored); Amir (penalty scored); Williams (penalty scored); Buers (penalty scored)		(penalty scored) McConnell; (penalty scored) Yearn; (penalty scored) Braithwaite; (penalty scored) Beckett; (penalty scored) Tarpey

4 November 2021	AFC Sudbury (8)	2–3	Chelmsford City (6)	Sudbury
19:00 GMT	Bennett 26'; Stokes 80' (pen.)	Report	Hockey 25'; Deslandes 41'; Payne 66'	Stadium: MEL Group Stadium; Attendance: 315; Referee: Ayrton Hursey

4 November 2021	Lewes (7)	1–2	Bromley (5)	Lewes
19:45 GMT	Hack 78'	Report	Krauhaus 29'; Kader 57'	Stadium: The Dripping Pan; Attendance: 190; Referee: Luis Nunes
Note: Due to the referee sin binning a Lewes player on Monday, a sub-committee of the F.A. Youth Committee on Thursday 4 November decided the game was not played in accordance with the Laws of the Game as sin bins are not used in the F.A. Youth Cup. Therefore the match was re-played at Bromley on Friday 12 November.

5 November 2021	Basford United (7)	1–2	Doncaster Rovers (3)	Basford
19:00 GMT	Bonner 50'	Report	Fletcher 21'; Goodman 90+3'	Stadium: Greenwich Avenue; Attendance: 346; Referee: Reece Davies

5 November 2021	Burton Albion (3)	0–3	Sheffield Wednesday (3)	Burton-upon-Trent
19:00 GMT		Report	Maginnis 5' (o.g.); Davidson 35' (pen.), 86'	Stadium: Pirelli Stadium; Attendance: 378; Referee: James King

12 November 2021	Bromley (5)	4–2	Lewes (7)	Bromley
19:00 GMT	Kader 42' (pen.), 73' (pen.); Wyborn 60'; Adaja 90+1'	Report	Margeson 22'; Rohilla 55'	Stadium: Hayes Lane; Attendance: 190; Referee: Lawrence Torz-Brown

Hartlepool United (5)	Walkover	Bolton Wanderers (4)

=== Second round ===
42 teams play this round with all the winners from the previous round participating.

11 November 2021	Salford City (4)	3–2 (a.e.t.)	Port Vale (4)	Salford
19:00 GMT	Kirnon 45+2'; Finley 56'; Walsh 111'	Report	Plant 67', 90+5' (pen.)	Stadium: Moor Lane; Attendance: 258; Referee: Matthew Young

12 November 2021	Fleetwood Town (3)	1–0 (a.e.t.)	Mansfield Town (4)	Fleetwood
19:00 GMT	Johnson 113' (pen.)	Report		Stadium: Highbury Stadium; Referee: Andy Sykes

13 November 2021	Crewe Alexandra (3)	5–3 (a.e.t.)	Harrogate Town (4)	Crewe
19:00 GMT	Tabiner 37'; O'Riordan 49'; Finney 95'; Kempster-Down 99'; Salisbury 119'		Dixon 14', 59'; Ilesanmi 97'	Stadium: Mornflake Stadium; Referee: James Lunn

15 November 2021	Chelmsford City (6)	0–4	Exeter City (4)	Chelmsford
19:00 GMT		Report	James 11'; Spencer 41', 52'; Collins 90' (pen.)	Stadium: EMG Inspire Stadium; Attendance: 240; Referee: Matthew Norton

15 November 2021	Corinthian-Casuals (7)	1–5	Cambridge United (3)	Kingston upon Thames
19:00 GMT	Omondi 20'	Report	Njoku 31', 52'; McConnell 55'; Beckett 63'; Akanbi 90+1'	Stadium: UBG Stadium; Referee: Michael Hayden

15 November 2021	Doncaster Rovers (3)	1–2 (a.e.t.)	Rotherham United (3)	Doncaster
19:00 GMT	Scattergood 45+1'	Report	Durose 90+5'; McGuckin 95'	Stadium: Keepmoat Stadium; Attendance: 490; Referee: Benjamin Tomlinson

16 November 2021	Scunthorpe United (4)	1–0	Guiseley (6)	Scunthorpe
19:00 GMT	Poulter 70'	Report		Stadium: Glanford Park; Attendance: 348; Referee: Anthony Tankard

16 November 2021	Forest Green Rovers (4)	3–4	Bromley (5)	Nailsworth
19:00 GMT	Oyebamiji 18'; Bennett 37'; Unknown 40' (o.g.)	Report	German 35'; Kader 88'; Wyborn 90+3'; Krauhaus 90+5'	Stadium: The New Lawn; Referee: Thomas Staten

16 November 2021	Accrington Stanley (3)	3–2	Bolton Wanderers (3)	Accrington
19:00 GMT	Adekoya 62', 72'; Pickles 78'	Report	Toure 18', 75'	Stadium: Wham Stadium; Attendance: 685; Referee: Abid Hussain

16 November 2021	Leyton Orient (4)	6–1	Newport County (4)	Leyton
19:00 GMT	Smith-Kouassi 2', 13'; Nkrumah 23', 48', 58'; Clements 61'	Report	Karadogan 75'	Stadium: Brisbane Road; Attendance: 261; Referee: Scott Rudd

17 November 2021	Bradford City (4)	1–3	Oldham Athletic (4)	Bradford
19:00 GMT	Pointon 3'	Report	Simms 6', 55', 90+4'	Stadium: Valley Parade; Attendance: 622; Referee: Jack Hall

17 November 2021	Northampton Town (4)	3–2 (a.e.t.)	Stockport County (5)	Northampton
19:00 GMT	Ngwa 15'; Curry 21'; Tomlinson 113'	Report	Johnston 8'; Walsh 42'	Stadium: PTS Academy Stadium; Attendance: 715; Referee: Andrew Hitchcox

17 November 2021	Aylestone Park (10)	1–2	Sheffield Wednesday (3)	Aylestone
19:00 GMT	Warren 73'	Report	Fusire 25'; Cadamarteri 29'	Stadium: Aylestone Park; Attendance: 1,250; Referee: Lee Hartley

17 November 2021	Rugby Town (9)	2–0	Morecambe (3)	Rugby
19:00 GMT	Smith 39'; Platts 71'	Report		Stadium: Butlin Road; Attendance: 520; Referee: lan Cox

17 November 2021	Plymouth Argyle (3)	3–1	Milton Keynes Dons (3)	Plymouth
19:00 GMT	Jenkins-Davies 19'; Salawu 23', 81'	Report	Meadows 53'	Stadium: Home Park; Attendance: 329; Referee: Mark Senior

17 November 2021	Stevenage (4)	0–2	Sutton United (4)	Stevenage
19:00 GMT		Report	Tanner 10'; Nunes 72'	Stadium: Lamex Stadium; Referee: Thomas Kelly

17 November 2021	Cheltenham Town (3)	4–3 (a.e.t.)	Portsmouth (3)	Evesham
19:00 GMT	Denness-Barrett 31', 49'; Jakeways 97'; Miles 98'	Report	Gifford 67', 75' (pen.), 105'	Stadium: The Spiers & Hartwell Stadium; Attendance: 202; Referee: Neil Pratt

17 November 2021	Aldershot Town (5)	1–4	Ipswich Town (3)	Aldershot
19:00 GMT	Limb 45'	Report	Manly 3'; Boatswain 62'; Barbrook 69'; Chirewa 87' (pen.)	Stadium: EBB Stadium; Attendance: 359; Referee: Nicholas Metcalfe

17 November 2021	Swindon Town (4)	0–2	Colchester United (4)	Swindon
19:00 GMT		Report	Bennett 90'; Lowe 90+2'	Stadium: County Ground; Attendance: 340; Referee: Andrew Sheppard

19 November 2021	Reading City (9)	2–3	Oxford United (3)	Reading
19:00 GMT	Balogun 72', 83'	Report	Nosakhare 35'; O'Donkor 74', 89'	Stadium: The River Moor; Attendance: 622; Referee: Stephen Hawkes

19 November 2021	Charlton Athletic (3)	2–0 (a.e.t.)	AFC Wimbledon (3)	Dartford
19:00 GMT	Adigun 98'; Reilly 118'	Report		Stadium: Princes Park; Attendance: 415; Referee: Kane Dempster

=== Third round ===
64 teams compete in the Third round with the 43 Premier League and EFL Championship Clubs appearing this round along with the 21 winners from the previous round. Only Brentford from the EFL Championship did not participate as they did not apply for the tournament.

1 December 2021	Birmingham City (2)	1–5	Blackburn Rovers (2)	Birmingham
19:00 GMT	Manton 27'	Report	Browne 8' (o.g.); Weston 14'; Pratt 49'; Batty 58'; Leonard 89'	Stadium: St Andrew's; Attendance: 340; Referee: Alan Cox

1 December 2021	Norwich City	2–3	Stoke City (2)	Norwich
19:00 GMT	Aboh 8'; Thorn 16'	Report	Waldo 21'; Knowles 40'; Griffiths 42'	Stadium: Carrow Road; Referee: Bradley Mingay

2 December 2021	Derby County (2)	0–1	Peterborough United (2)	Derby
19:00 GMT		Report	Hickinson 41'	Stadium: Pride Park Stadium; Referee: Elliott Kaye

2 December 2021	Exeter City (4)	0–2	AFC Bournemouth (2)	Exeter
19:00 GMT		Report	Gonzalez 6', 47'	Stadium: St James Park; Attendance: 315; Referee: Mark Senior

3 December 2021	Plymouth Argyle (3)	1–2	Brighton & Hove Albion	Plymouth
19:00 GMT	Pursall 86'	Report	Chouchane 23' (pen.); Ifill 51'	Stadium: Home Park; Attendance: 497; Referee: Craig Scriven

3 December 2021	Northampton Town (4)	0–6	Charlton Athletic (3)	Northampton
19:00 GMT		Report	Kanu 15', 29', 54'; Adigun 60' (pen.); Leaburn 73'; Campbell 85'	Stadium: PTS Academy Stadium; Attendance: 536; Referee: Reece Davies

5 December 2021	Crewe Alexandra (3)	1–0	Hull City (2)	Crewe
19:00 GMT	Holíček 84'	Report		Stadium: Gresty Road; Attendance: 450; Referee: Paul Roots

7 December 2021	Aston Villa	0–2	Leicester City	Birmingham
19:00 GMT		Report	Pennant 59'; Popov 90+4'	Stadium: Villa Park; Attendance: 627; Referee: Kurt Bartlett

7 December 2021	Burnley	3–0	Luton Town (2)	Leyland
19:00 GMT	Hugill 31'; Walters 45+2'; Wedd 65' (o.g.)	Report		Stadium: County Ground; Referee: Shaun Taylor

7 December 2021	Coventry City (2)	1–4	Leeds United	Coventry
19:00 GMT	Obikwu 87'	Report	Bradbury 54'; Dean 62', 90'; Wilson 68'	Stadium: Coventry Building Society Arena; Attendance: 250; Referee: Ryan Dix

7 December 2021	Nottingham Forest (2)	3–1	Bristol City (2)	Nottingham
19:00 GMT	Taylor 23'; Osong 61'; Nadin 80'	Report	Palmer-Houlden 31'	Stadium: City Ground; Attendance: 217; Referee: Daniel Smith

8 December 2021	Wolverhampton Wanderers	4–1	Salford City (4)	Wolverhampton
19:00 GMT	Fraser 10'; Farmer 24'; Roberts 44', 64'	Report	Finley 55'	Stadium: Molineux Stadium; Attendance: 505; Referee: Stuart Kane

8 December 2021	Queens Park Rangers (2)	2–1	Oldham Athletic (4)	White City
19:00 GMT	Murphy 55'; Dougui 70'	Report	Simms 74'	Stadium: Kiyan Prince Foundation Stadium; Attendance: 538; Referee: Daniel Simpson

8 December 2021	Rugby Town (9)	0–4	Cheltenham Town (3)	Rugby
19:00 GMT		Report	Denness-Barrett 13'; Hunt 45+1'; Jakeways 47', 53'	Stadium: Butlin Road; Attendance: 426; Referee: Joe Woolmer

8 December 2021	Cambridge United (3)	2–2 (a.e.t.) (4–2 p)	Oxford United (3)	Cambridge
19:00 GMT	Akanbi 56'; Yearn 90+2'	Report	O'Donkor 58'; Smith 86'	Stadium: Abbey Stadium; Attendance: 190; Referee: Thomas Hancock
	Penalties
	McConnell (penalty scored); Yearn (penalty scored); Braithwaite (penalty scored); Winterbone (penalty scored)		(penalty missed) Golding; (penalty scored) Smith; (penalty scored) Owens; (penalty missed) Masters

8 December 2021	Cardiff City (2)	1–2	Watford	Cardiff
19:00 GMT	Crole 67'	Report	Forde 71'; Manning 89'	Stadium: Cardiff City Stadium; Attendance: 466; Referee: Andrew Sheppard

8 December 2021	Sutton United (4)	2–2 (a.e.t.) (2–4 p)	Preston North End (2)	Sutton
19:00 GMT	Mutale 15'; Fitzgerald 68'	Report	O'Neill 24'; Mawene 63'	Stadium: Gander Green Lane; Attendance: 164; Referee: George Warren
	Penalties
	Charles-Cook (penalty scored); Tanner (penalty scored); McNally (penalty missed); Mutale (penalty missed)		(penalty scored) Leigh; (penalty missed) Green; (penalty scored) Best; (penalty scored) Lewis; (penalty scored) Seary

8 December 2021	Barnsley (2)	1–2	Crystal Palace	Barnsley
19:00 GMT	Jalo 72'	Report	Akinwale 77' (pen.); Ole-Adebomi 89'	Stadium: Oakwell; Attendance: 312; Referee: Ben Tomlinson

9 December 2021	Blackpool (2)	1–0	Huddersfield Town (2)	Blackpool
19:00 GMT	Johnston 26'	Report		Stadium: Bloomfield Road; Attendance: 300; Referee: Alexander Beckett

9 December 2021	Southampton	0–1	Sheffield Wednesday (3)	Southampton
19:00 GMT		Report	Cadamarteri 77'	Stadium: St Mary's Stadium; Attendance: 734; Referee: Harry Scott

9 December 2021	Bromley (5)	1–3 (a.e.t.)	Reading (2)	Bromley
19:00 GMT	Krauhaus 35'	Report	Ehibhatiomhan 34'; Furlong 104', 120+2'	Stadium: Hayes Lane; Attendance: 704; Referee: Peter Conn

10 December 2021	Colchester United (4)	3–0	Arsenal	Colchester
19:00 GMT	Lowe 45'; Tovide 80'; Bennett 90'	Report		Stadium: Colchester Community Stadium; Attendance: 600; Referee: Adrian George

10 December 2021	Everton	3–2	Fulham (2)	Liverpool
19:00 GMT	Mills 60', 67'; Okoronkwo 86'	Report	Sanderson 23'; Dibley-Dias 90+6'	Stadium: Goodison Park; Attendance: 267; Referee: Martyn Mitchell

10 December 2021	West Ham United	2–3	Newcastle United	Romford
19:00 GMT	Mubama 75'; Earthy 90+5'	Report	Ndiweni 70', 90+3'; Turner-Cooke 89'	Stadium: Rush Green; Attendance: 110; Referee: Thomas Whay

11 December 2021	Liverpool	4–0	Fleetwood Town (3)	Kirkby
19:00 GMT	Chambers 30' (pen.); Musiałowski 40', 44', 70'	Report		Stadium: Kirkby Academy; Attendance: 284; Referee: Nik Storey

11 December 2021	Middlesbrough (2)	0–3	Manchester City	Bishop Auckland
19:00 GMT		Report	O'Reilly 31', 68'; Mebude 90'	Stadium: Heritage Park; Attendance: 184; Referee: Stephen Dial

12 December 2021	Chelsea	4–1	Leyton Orient (4)	Kingston upon Thames
19:00 GMT	Mothersille 19'; Soonsup-Bell 25'; Thomas 37'; Abu 79'	Report	Tanga 64'	Stadium: Kingsmeadow; Attendance: 781; Referee: Jorden Gibson

13 December 2021	Manchester United	4–2	Scunthorpe United (4)	Greater Manchester
19:00 GMT	Mather 13'; Garnacho 26'; Oyedele 48'; McNeill 53'	Report	Lewis 38'; Robertson 63'	Stadium: Old Trafford; Attendance: 6,000 estimated Referee: Jake Topp

14 December 2021	West Bromwich Albion	3–2	Rotherham United (3)	West Bromwich
19:00 GMT	Cleary 43', 90+5'; Richards 56'	Report	Durose 7'; Carroll 22'	Stadium: The Hawthorns; Referee: Joshua Hackett

14 December 2021	Accrington Stanley (3)	1–0 (a.e.t.)	Swansea City (2)	Accrington
19:00 GMT	Trickett 113'	Report		Stadium: Wham Stadium; Attendance: 825; Referee: Matthew Archibald

15 December 2021	Sheffield United (2)	1–1 (a.e.t.) (6–5 p)	Millwall (2)	Sheffield
19:00 GMT	Peck 72'	Report	Leahy 87'	Stadium: Bramall Lane; Attendance: 310; Referee: Matthew Bacon
	Penalties
	Dickinson (penalty scored); Staniland (penalty missed); Hampson (penalty scored); Smith (penalty scored); Peck (penalty scored); Havenhand (penalty missed); Blacker (penalty scored); Pitan (penalty scored)		(penalty scored) Lovelace; (penalty scored) Esse; (penalty scored) Leahy; (penalty scored) Coleman; (penalty missed) Okoli; (penalty missed) Massey; (penalty scored) Walker; (penalty missed) Evans

16 December 2021	Tottenham Hotspur	5–1	Ipswich Town (3)	Stevenage
19:00 GMT	Williams 6'; Devine 28'; Davies 82', 90+6'; Haysman 90+3'	Report	Boatswain 57'	Stadium: Lamex Stadium; Attendance: 295; Referee: Matthew Norton

=== Fourth round ===
32 teams participate in the Fourth round proper with all 32 winners from the previous round participating.

22 December 2021	Cheltenham Town (3)	1–3	Blackpool (2)	Cheltenham
19:00 GMT	Hunt 8'	Report	Daniels 7'; Francis 21'; Squires 54'	Stadium: Whaddon Road; Attendance: 423; Referee: Richie Watkins

12 January 2022	Blackburn Rovers (2)	3–0	Stoke City (2)	Leyland
19:00 GMT	Wood 27', 46'; Leonard 44'	Report		Stadium: County Ground; Attendance: 348; Referee: Richard Holmes

12 January 2022	AFC Bournemouth (2)	2–0	Queens Park Rangers (2)	Bournemouth
19:00 GMT	Adu-Adjei 3'; Boutin 77'	Report		Stadium: Dean Court; Attendance: 891; Referee: Alex Blake

13 January 2022	Reading (2)	1–3	Manchester United	Reading
19:00 GMT	Greaver 82'	Report	Mainoo 24'; Mather 37'; McNeill 38'	Stadium: Madejski Stadium; Attendance: 1,006; Referee: Jason Richardson

13 January 2022	Watford	2–3 (a.e.t.)	Chelsea	Watford
19:00 GMT	Adeyemo 44'; Blake 75'	Report	Vale 9', 105'; Mothersille 22'	Stadium: Vicarage Road; Attendance: 1,147; Referee: Andrew Humphries

14 January 2022	Everton	2–1	Sheffield United (2)	Liverpool
19:00 GMT	Okoronkwo 43'; Mills 63'	Report	Sachdev 88'	Stadium: Goodison Park; Attendance: 319; Referee: Ed Duckworth

14 January 2022	Leicester City	1–0	Crewe Alexandra (3)	Leicester
19:00 GMT	Butterfill 90'	Report		Stadium: LCFC Training Ground; Attendance: 448; Referee: Jonathan Maskrey

15 January 2022	Crystal Palace	1–1 (a.e.t.) (5–6 p)	Wolverhampton Wanderers	Selhurst
19:00 GMT	Ole-Adebomi 6'	Report	Fraser 90+3'	Stadium: Selhurst Park; Referee: Steven Hughes
	Penalties
	Raymond (penalty scored); Wells-Morrison (penalty scored); Rodney (penalty scored); Ole-Adebomi (penalty scored); Akinwale (penalty missed); Vigor (penalty scored); Cadogan (penalty missed)		(penalty scored) Griffiths; (penalty scored) Keto-Diyawa; (penalty missed) Esen; (penalty scored) Lembikisa; (penalty scored) Tipton; (penalty scored) Roberts; (penalty scored) Francis-Burrell

17 January 2022	Newcastle United	3–2	Colchester United (4)	Newcastle-upon-Tyne
19:00 GMT	Lowe 12' (o.g.); McNally 52'; Ndiweni 62'	Report	Tovide 76'; Marcel-Dilaver 90+3'	Stadium: St James' Park; Attendance: 1,279; Referee: James Westgate

18 January 2022	Accrington Stanley (3)	1–2	Charlton Athletic (3)	Accrington
19:00 GMT	Adekoya 30'	Report	Kanu 14'; Adigun 45'	Stadium: Wham Stadium; Attendance: 794; Referee: Simeon Lucas

18 January 2022	Peterborough United (2)	1–2	Nottingham Forest (2)	Peterborough
19:00 GMT	Hickinson 26'	Report	Taylor 16'; Nadin 73'	Stadium: London Road Stadium; Attendance: 601; Referee: Andrew Humphries

18 January 2022	Sheffield Wednesday (3)	1–0	Preston North End (2)	Sheffield
19:00 GMT	Davidson 40'	Report		Stadium: Hillsborough Stadium; Attendance: 892; Referee: Aaron Bannister

18 January 2022	Brighton & Hove Albion	1–0	Manchester City	Brighton
19:00 GMT	Emmerson 73'	Report		Stadium: AMEX Elite Performance Centre; Attendance: 114; Referee: Michael Ryan

19 January 2022	Liverpool	4–1	Burnley	Kirkby
19:00 GMT	Frauendorf 4'; Musiałowski 12', 59'; Cannonier 53'	Report	Etaluku 57'	Stadium: Kirkby Academy; Attendance: 104; Referee: Ben Wyatt

19 January 2022	Cambridge United (3)	2–0	Leeds United	Cambridge
19:00 GMT	Yearn 31'; Njoku 45'	Report 1 Report 2		Stadium: Abbey Stadium; Attendance: 929; Referee: Aji Ajibola

21 January 2022	Tottenham Hotspur	6–1	West Bromwich Albion (2)	Enfield
13:00 GMT	Williams 26', 61'; Devine 54'; Sayers 65'; Bloxham 75', 76'	Report	Cleary 60' (pen.)	Stadium: Hotspur Way; Attendance: 119; Referee: Isaac Searle

=== Fifth round ===
16 teams participate in the Fifth round proper with all 16 winners from the previous round participating.

27 January 2022	Blackburn Rovers (2)	2–1	Sheffield Wednesday (3)	Blackburn
19:00 GMT	Wood 45'; Gamble 59'	Report	Davidson 4'	Stadium: Ewood Park; Attendance: 869; Referee: Richard Aspinall

28 January 2022	AFC Bournemouth (2)	1–5	Leicester City	Bournemouth
19:00 GMT	Brown 51'	Report	Alves 31'; Popov 33'; Braybrooke 58'; Cover 84', 86'	Stadium: Dean Court; Attendance: 903; Referee: Alex Blake

29 January 2022	Liverpool	3–4	Chelsea	Kirkby
17:30 GMT	Chambers 5'; Gordon 38'; Cannonier 59'	Report	Webster 70'; Soonsup-Bell 77'; Mothersille 87'; Mendel-Idowu 90+5'	Stadium: Kirkby Academy; Attendance: 254; Referee: Richard Holmes

9 February 2022	Blackpool (2)	3–0	Newcastle United	Blackpool
19:00 GMT	Matshazi 22', 37'; Daniels 80'	Report		Stadium: Bloomfield Road; Attendance: 1,343; Referee: Ben Wyatt

9 February 2022	Cambridge United (3)	0–0 (a.e.t.) (3–5 p)	Nottingham Forest (2)	Cambridge
19:00 GMT		Report 1 Report 2		Stadium: Abbey Stadium; Attendance: 968; Referee: Matthew Norton
	Penalties
	McConnell (penalty missed); Yearn (penalty scored); Braithwaite (penalty scored); Njoku (penalty scored)		(penalty scored) McDonnell; (penalty scored) Powell; (penalty scored) Collins; (penalty scored) Korpal; (penalty scored) Bott

9 February 2022	Charlton Athletic (3)	0–2	Brighton & Hove Albion	Charlton
19:00 GMT		Report 1 Report 2	Ferguson 4'; Moran 57'	Stadium: The Valley; Attendance: 1,066; Referee: Stephen Parkinson

9 February 2022	Manchester United	4–1	Everton	Greater Manchester
19:00 GMT	McNeill 14' (pen.); Mainoo 28'; Mather 65'; Garnacho 90'	Report	Okoronkwo 11'	Stadium: Old Trafford; Attendance: 4,000; Referee: Dean Watson

12 February 2022	Wolverhampton Wanderers	3–0	Tottenham Hotspur	Wolverhampton
13:00 GMT	Keto-Diyawa 17'; Roberts 63', 71'	Report		Stadium: Molineux Stadium; Attendance: 850; Referee: Richie Watkins

=== Quarter-finals ===
8 teams participate in the Quarter-finals with all 8 winners from the previous round participating.

24 February 2022	Manchester United	2–1	Leicester City	Greater Manchester
18:00 GMT	Garnacho 42', 88'	Report	Popov 29'	Stadium: Old Trafford; Attendance: 3,984; Referee: Thomas Kirk

24 February 2022	Chelsea	3–2	Blackpool (2)	Fulham
19:00 GMT	Vale 14'; Mothersille 42'; Webster 72' (pen.)	Report	Daniels 5'; Badley-Morgan 59' (o.g.)	Stadium: Stamford Bridge; Attendance: 1,097; Referee: Robert Whitton

26 February 2022	Wolverhampton Wanderers	3–1	Brighton & Hove Albion	Wolverhampton
13:00 GMT	Tipton 8'; Fraser 23'; Griffiths 68'	Report	Emmerson 12'	Stadium: Molineux Stadium; Attendance: 1,041; Referee: Scott Tallis

3 March 2022	Blackburn Rovers (2)	1–3	Nottingham Forest (2)	Blackburn
19:00 GMT	Gamble 90+6'	Report	Nadin 26'; Esapa Osong 42', 77'	Stadium: Ewood Park; Attendance: 808; Referee: Michael Barlow

=== Semi-finals ===
4 teams participate in the Semi-finals with all 4 winners from the previous round participating.

9 March 2022	Manchester United	3–0	Wolverhampton Wanderers	Greater Manchester
19:00 GMT	McNeill 16', 89'; Garnacho 59'	Report		Stadium: Old Trafford; Attendance: 6,133; Referee: Ben Toner

4 April 2022	Nottingham Forest (2)	3–1	Chelsea	Nottingham
19:00 GMT	Taylor 86'; Esapa Osong 90', 90+3' (pen.)	Report	Webster 61'	Stadium: City Ground; Attendance: 3,950; Referee: Sam Barrott

=== Final ===
The winners of the Semi-finals play this match to determine the winner of the FA Youth Cup.

11 May 2022
19:45

Manchester United	3–1	Nottingham Forest (2)
Bennett 13'; Garnacho 78', 90+4'	Report	Powell 43'

Old Trafford
Attendance: 67,492
Referee: Josh Smith

Note: Flags indicate national team as defined under FIFA eligibility rules; some limited exceptions apply. Players may hold more than one non-FIFA nationality.

Manchester United
No.	Pos.	Nation	Player
1	GK	CZE	Radek Vitek
2	DF	ESP	Marc Jurado
3	DF	ENG	Sam Murray
4	DF	SCO	Louis Jackson
5	DF	ENG	Rhys Bennett
6	MF	ENG	Kobbie Mainoo
7	MF	ENG	Sam Mather (substituted off) 86'
8	MF	ENG	Dan Gore
9	FW	ENG	Charlie McNeill (substituted off) 64'
10	MF	NOR	Isak Hansen-Aarøen (substituted off) 64'
11	FW	ARG	Alejandro Garnacho
Substitutes:
12	DF	ENG	Logan Pye
13	GK	ENG	Tom Wooster
14	MF	ENG	Omari Forson
15	DF	ENG	Sonny Aljofree (substituted on) 86'
16	MF	POL	Maximillian Oyedele (substituted on) 64'
17	FW	ENG	Joe Hugill (substituted on) 64'
18	MF	ENG	Ethan Ennis
Coach: (Republic of Ireland) Travis Binnion

Nottingham Forest
No.	Pos.	Nation	Player
1	GK	ENG	Aaron Bott
2	DF	ENG	Zach Abbott
3	MF	ENG	Kyle McAdam
4	DF	WAL	Ben Hammond
5	DF	ENG	Pharrell Johnson
6	DF	ENG	Justin Hanks (substituted off) 81'
7	MF	ENG	Joshua Powell
8	MF	NIR	Jamie McDonnell (substituted off) 90+1'
9	FW	ENG	Detlef Esapa-Osong
10	FW	NIR	Dale Taylor
11	MF	WAL	Sam Collins (substituted off) 73'
Substitutes:
12	GK	ENG	Alex Akers
13	MF	ENG	Ben Perry (substituted on) 73'
14	MF	ENG	Jack Perkins
15	DF	ENG	Jack Thompson
16	FW	IRL	Joe Gardner (substituted on) 81'
17	FW	ENG	Jack Nadin
18	MF	ENG	Aaron Korpal (substituted on) 90+1'
Coach: (England) Warren Joyce
