= 2024–25 Manchester United F.C. season =

English football club season

Manchester United
2024–25 season
- Owner: Manchester United plc (71.06%); Ineos (28.94%)
- Co-chairmen: Joel and Avram Glazer
- Head coach: Erik ten Hag (until 28 October); Ruud van Nistelrooy (interim; 28 October – 11 November); Ruben Amorim (from 11 November)
- Stadium: Old Trafford
- Premier League: 15th
- FA Cup: Fifth round
- EFL Cup: Quarter-finals
- UEFA Europa League: Runners-up
- FA Community Shield: Runners-up
- Top goalscorer: League: Amad Diallo; Bruno Fernandes (8 each); All: Bruno Fernandes (19)
- Highest home attendance: 73,839 (v. Aston Villa, 25 May 2025)
- Lowest home attendance: 67,614 (v. Fulham, 2 March 2025)
- Average home league attendance: 73,747
| Home colours | Away colours | Third colours |

The 2024–25 season was the 138th season in the history of Manchester United, the club's 33rd in the Premier League, and their 50th consecutive—and 100th overall—season in the top flight of English football. The club competed in the Premier League, the FA Cup, the EFL Cup, the UEFA Europa League, and the FA Community Shield. It marked the first full season since 2004–05 in which the Glazer family did not oversee football operations, following the sale of a 27.7% stake to Sir Jim Ratcliffe in February 2024.

Erik ten Hag began the campaign in his third year as manager, but was dismissed in October following a poor start to the season. Former United striker and assistant coach Ruud van Nistelrooy assumed interim charge before Rúben Amorim was appointed as head coach on 11 November, following his departure from Sporting CP.

The season was widely regarded as the worst in the club's modern history. United finished 15th in the Premier League with 42 points—their lowest league position since 1989–90 and fewest points in a top-flight season since they were last relegated in 1973–74. In domestic cup competitions, their defence of the FA Cup ended in the fifth round with a penalty shootout defeat at home to Fulham, while they were eliminated from the EFL Cup in the quarter-finals after a 4–3 loss to Tottenham Hotspur. United reached the final of the UEFA Europa League, but were beaten 1–0 by Tottenham at the San Mamés Stadium in Bilbao. As a result, they failed to qualify for European competition for the first time since the 2013–14 season (and only the second time since 1989–90). It was the club's first trophyless campaign since 2021–22.

== Pre-season and friendlies ==
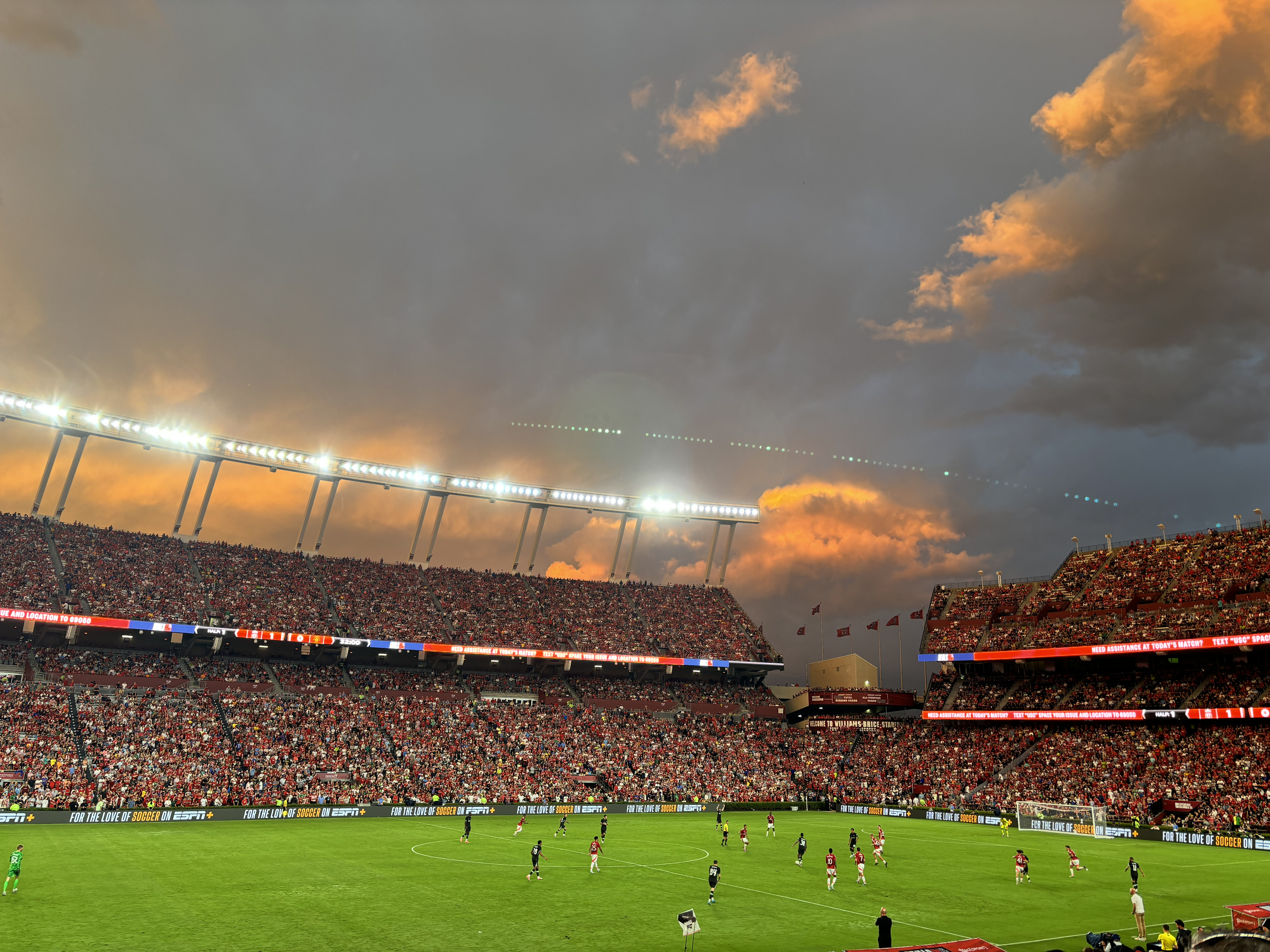
Action from the pre-season game against Liverpool in South Carolina.

On 23 February 2024, United announced a tour of the United States, with friendly matches against rivals Arsenal and Liverpool at the SoFi Stadium in Inglewood, California (near Los Angeles), on 27 July and at the Williams–Brice Stadium in Columbia, South Carolina, on 3 August, respectively. In March, they announced another game in the United States – against Real Betis on 31 July at the Snapdragon Stadium in San Diego, a venue with which the club shares a sponsor. Ten days later, United announced they would play Rangers for the first time in a decade at Murrayfield Stadium in Edinburgh on 20 July. The first match of their pre-season tour was announced on 5 April; they faced Norwegian side Rosenborg at the Lerkendal Stadion in Trondheim on 15 July.

United lost their first match of pre-season against Rosenborg 1–0 after a goal in the last minute. They registered their first win of pre-season in Scotland, where they beat Rangers 2–0 thanks to goals from Amad Diallo and Joe Hugill; newly signed defender Leny Yoro made his debut in the game, playing the first 45 minutes. In the first game of the U.S. tour against Arsenal, Rasmus Højlund put United ahead early; however, both he and Yoro suffered injuries in the first half that ruled them out of the opening matches of the season. Gabriel Jesus levelled in the first half and Gabriel Martinelli scored the winner for Arsenal after the break, although United went on to win the post-match exhibition penalty shoot-out 4–3. United returned to winning ways against Real Betis, when goals from Marcus Rashford, Amad Diallo and Casemiro secured a 3–2 win. Manchester United's tour of the United States ended with a 3–0 loss to rivals Liverpool.

At the end of the season, Manchester United travelled to Asia to play friendlies against an ASEAN All-Stars team in Kuala Lumpur and the Hong Kong national team in Hong Kong.

| Date | Opponents | H / A | Result F–A | Scorers | Attendance |
|---|---|---|---|---|---|
| 15 July 2024 | Rosenborg | A | 0–1 | | 21,013 |
| 20 July 2024 | Rangers | N | 2–0 | Diallo 39', Hugill 70' | 56,574 |
| 27 July 2024 | Arsenal | N | 1–2 (4–3 p) (Note: It was agreed before the game that penalties would be taken regardless of the result of the match.) | Højlund 10' | 62,486 |
| 31 July 2024 | Real Betis | N | 3–2 | Rashford 18' (pen.), Diallo 24', Casemiro 31' | 26,248 |
| 3 August 2024 | Liverpool | N | 0–3 | | 77,559 |
| 28 May 2025 | ASEAN All-Stars | N | 0–1 | | 72,550 |
| 30 May 2025 | Hong Kong | A | 3–1 | Obi (2) 50', 82', Heaven 90+4' | 33,098 |

== FA Community Shield ==
As a result of winning the 2023–24 FA Cup, Manchester United faced Manchester City, who won the 2023–24 Premier League, in what was United's 31st Community Shield appearance, and their first since 2016. After United took the lead late in the second-half through Alejandro Garnacho, City equalised through Bernardo Silva in the 88th minute, taking the game to penalties. André Onana saved City's first penalty from Silva, but Jadon Sancho's miss with United's fourth kick meant the shoot-out went to sudden death; Jonny Evans put United's eighth penalty over the bar, allowing Manuel Akanji to give City a 7–6 victory.

| Date | Opponents | H / A | Result F–A | Scorers | Attendance |
|---|---|---|---|---|---|
| 10 August 2024 | Manchester City | N | 1–1 (6–7p) | Garnacho 82' | 78,168 |

== Premier League ==
=== Matches ===
The 2024–25 Premier League fixtures were released on 18 June 2024. Manchester United opened their Premier League campaign on 16 August 2024 with a 1–0 win over Fulham. Substitute and debutant Joshua Zirkzee scored the only goal of the match in the 87th minute. United then travelled to the Amex Stadium to take on Brighton & Hove Albion. Former United man Danny Welbeck opened the scoring in the 30th minute, capitalising on a defensive mistake. Amad Diallo then levelled the scores in the 61st minute, before United put the ball in the back of the net again through Alejandro Garnacho; however, replays showed that Zirkzee had accidentally tapped the ball into the net from an offside position while attempting to stand up, causing the goal to be ruled out. João Pedro then scored a late winner with an unmarked header at the back post, condemning the Red Devils to a first league defeat of the season. United then hosted arch-rivals Liverpool at home; although United started well, Trent Alexander-Arnold had the ball in their net in the 8th minute, although the goal was ultimately ruled out for offside. By half-time, United found themselves 2–0 down due to a brace of goals from Luis Díaz. Mohamed Salah scored a third goal for Liverpool in the 56th minute to seal a 3–0 defeat for United.

United then travelled to St Mary's Stadium to face newly promoted Southampton. Two first half goals from Matthijs de Ligt and Marcus Rashford in quick succession, after United goalkeeper Andre Onana had been forced into a penalty save, meant the game was comfortable for United. Garnacho then came off the bench to score a third in second half stoppage time, securing a second victory of the season. United's next game against Crystal Palace was a 0–0 draw, where Onana gained his third clean sheet of the season after being forced into a double-save that later won Premier League Save of the Month for September. To close the month, the Red Devils hosted Tottenham Hotspur, and they conceded in the third minute after centre-back Micky van de Ven was allowed to run through the midfield unchallenged before setting up Brennan Johnson to score. Bruno Fernandes was sent off for the first time in his career after a late tackle on James Maddison, leaving United with 10 men just before half-time. The second half was marked by goals from Dejan Kulusevski and Dominic Solanke, sealing a second 3–0 defeat at home in a row.

To kick off October, United traveled to Aston Villa. An exemplary performance from defender Jonny Evans helped secure a clean sheet, though Villa's keeper and Man of the Match Emiliano Martínez held United to a goalless draw. This result left United with their worst start since the 1989–90 campaign. Two weeks later, following the international break, United hosted Brentford. The visitors opened the scoring when Ethan Pinnock headed in a corner in the fifth minute of stoppage time at the end of the first half. Garnacho equalised for United two minutes after the restart, before Rasmus Højlund scored in the 62nd minute to win the game 2–1. For the last Premier League game of October, United were away to West Ham. After a goalless first half, West Ham opened the scoring in the 74th minute through Crysencio Summerville. United were able to equalise in the 81st minute through a header from Casemiro, only for a penalty to be awarded late on for a collision between Matthijs de Ligt and Danny Ings inside Man Utd's penalty area; although it was not given on the field, a VAR check ultimately awarded West Ham a penalty. Jarrod Bowen scored from the spot in injury time to win the game for West Ham. This was manager Erik ten Hag's last game as Man Utd manager, as on 28 October it was announced that he had been sacked, and that Ruud van Nistelrooy would take over as the interim manager. For the first game of November, United hosted Chelsea. United opened the scoring in the second half, with Rasmus Højlund being taken down in the box by Chelsea goalkeeper Robert Sánchez with Bruno Fernandes subsequently converting the penalty. The lead did not last long, however, as just four minutes after scoring, Moisés Caicedo scored an equaliser with a volley from the edge of the box following a corner. The game ended in a 1–1 draw. United then hosted Leicester City and opened the scoring in the 17th minute through a Bruno Fernandes shot at the edge of the box into the bottom right corner. United scored again in the first half in the 38th minute as Noussair Mazraoui crossed in the ball, with it deflecting off both Bruno Fernandes and Leicester defender Victor Kristiansen into the Leicester net, going down as a Kristiansen own goal. To close the game, substitute Alejandro Garnacho scored a screamer from outside the box curling the ball into the top right corner, winning the game 3–0 for Man United. United's first game under newly appointed head coach Ruben Amorim came after another international break and saw them travel to Ipswich Town. United opened the scoring after just 90 seconds through Marcus Rashford, but were unable to hold onto their lead, as in the 43rd minute, Ipswich's Omari Hutchinson scored from a shot outside the box, deflecting off the head of Mazraoui into the top left corner of the goal. Neither side was able to convert their chances in the second half and the game ended in a 1–1 draw.

To open December, United hosted Everton. United won comfortably 4–0 with Rashford and Zirkzee both scoring twice. The following game was away against Arsenal, who won 2–0 through goals from Jurriën Timber and William Saliba, both coming from corners. United then hosted Nottingham Forest at Old Trafford. Forest centre back Nikola Milenković opened scoring in just the second minute from a corner. Rasmus Højlund was able to equalise in the 18th minute, scoring a rebound after Garnacho had his shot saved by Forest goalkeeper Matz Sels. Early in the second half Forest took the lead again through Morgan Gibbs-White scoring from outside of the box. Chris Wood then added to Forest's lead, scoring a looping header in the 54th minute. In the 61st minute, Bruno Fernandes scored a goal from the edge of the box, but United were unable to convert any of their other chances, and the game finished 3–2. It was the first time Forest had beaten United at Old Trafford since December 1994. Next was the Manchester derby away at the City of Manchester Stadium. City opened the scoring in the first half through a Joško Gvardiol header. Late on in the game, Amad Diallo intercepted a poor back-pass from Matheus Nunes, who brought Amad down inside the box, earning a penalty for United. Bruno Fernandes successfully converted the penalty to bring the game level. Less than two minutes later, a long ball over the top found Amad, who took the ball around Ederson with his first touch and scored with his second touch, winning the game 2–1 for Manchester United. Following this, United hosted Bournemouth. In the first half, United conceded from another set-piece as Dean Huijsen scored a flicked header from a Ryan Christie free-kick. In the second half, Noussair Mazraoui brought down Justin Kluivert in the box to concede a penalty, which Kluivert scored. Just two minutes after the penalty, Antoine Semenyo scored the final goal and United lost 3–0 at home to Bournemouth for the second season in a row. On Boxing Day, United travelled to Wolverhampton Wanderers where, early in the second half, captain Bruno Fernandes was sent off for a second yellow card. In the 58th minute, Matheus Cunha scored directly from a corner to give Wolves the lead. In the ninth minute of injury time, Hwang Hee-chan scored to end the game in a 2–0 defeat for United. For the last Premier League game of 2024, United hosted Newcastle, who scored twice in the opening 20 minutes through Alexander Isak and Joelinton, ending the year with a 2–0 loss for Manchester United.

On 19 January 2025, Amorim labelled his team as probably the worst in the history of the club after their 3–1 defeat to Brighton & Hove Albion. The defeat was the club's fourth in the past five games at Old Trafford. Following the defeat, the club sat in 13th in the table, 10 points above the relegation zone.

By mid-May with two Premier League games remaining United had slipped to 16th place in the league following a 2–0 defeat to West Ham United at Old Trafford, which marked their ninth home league defeat of season (a joint club record) and their seventeenth defeat in the league overall. This also meant the club equalled its worst winless run in the Premier League era of seven league games without a win. This winless run in the league was extended to record 8 games after United suffered a 1–0 defeat to Chelsea at Stamford Bridge in their penultimate Premier League fixture. United ended their winless run in the league after beating Aston Villa 2–0 at Old Trafford in the final league match of season courtesy of goals from Amad Diallo and Christian Eriksen. This meant United finished 15th in the league table with 42 points, that points total being just half that of bitter rivals and eventual champions Liverpool.

| Date | Opponents | H / A | Result F–A | Scorers | Attendance | League position |
|---|---|---|---|---|---|---|
| 16 August 2024 | Fulham | H | 1–0 | Zirkzee 87' | 73,297 | 1st |
| 24 August 2024 | Brighton & Hove Albion | A | 1–2 | Diallo 60' | 31,537 | 11th |
| 1 September 2024 | Liverpool | H | 0–3 | | 73,738 | 14th |
| 14 September 2024 | Southampton | A | 3–0 | De Ligt 35', Rashford 41', Garnacho 90+6' | 31,144 | 10th |
| 21 September 2024 | Crystal Palace | A | 0–0 | | 25,172 | 11th |
| 29 September 2024 | Tottenham Hotspur | H | 0–3 | | 73,587 | 13th |
| 6 October 2024 | Aston Villa | A | 0–0 | | 42,682 | 14th |
| 19 October 2024 | Brentford | H | 2–1 | Garnacho 47', Højlund 62' | 73,738 | 11th |
| 27 October 2024 | West Ham United | A | 1–2 | Casemiro 81' | 62,474 | 14th |
| 3 November 2024 | Chelsea | H | 1–1 | Fernandes 70' (pen.) | 73,813 | 13th |
| 10 November 2024 | Leicester City | H | 3–0 | Fernandes 17', Kristiansen 38' (o.g.), Garnacho 82' | 73,829 | 13th |
| 24 November 2024 | Ipswich Town | A | 1–1 | Rashford 2' | 30,017 | 12th |
| 1 December 2024 | Everton | H | 4–0 | Rashford (2) 34', 46', Zirkzee (2) 41', 64' | 73,817 | 9th |
| 4 December 2024 | Arsenal | A | 0–2 | | 60,256 | 13th |
| 7 December 2024 | Nottingham Forest | H | 2–3 | Højlund 18', Fernandes 61' | 73,778 | 13th |
| 15 December 2024 | Manchester City | A | 2–1 | Fernandes 88' (pen.), Diallo 90' | 52,788 | 13th |
| 22 December 2024 | Bournemouth | H | 0–3 | | 73,720 | 13th |
| 26 December 2024 | Wolverhampton Wanderers | A | 0–2 | | 31,407 | 14th |
| 30 December 2024 | Newcastle United | H | 0–2 | | 73,809 | 14th |
| 5 January 2025 | Liverpool | A | 2–2 | Martínez 52', Diallo 80' | 60,275 | 13th |
| 16 January 2025 | Southampton | H | 3–1 | Diallo (3) 82', 90', 90+4' | 73,722 | 12th |
| 19 January 2025 | Brighton & Hove Albion | H | 1–3 | Fernandes 23' (pen.) | 73,758 | 13th |
| 26 January 2025 | Fulham | A | 1–0 | Martínez 78' | 27,288 | 12th |
| 2 February 2025 | Crystal Palace | H | 0–2 | | 73,751 | 13th |
| 16 February 2025 | Tottenham Hotspur | A | 0–1 | | 61,383 | 15th |
| 22 February 2025 | Everton | A | 2–2 | Fernandes 72', Ugarte 80' | 39,290 | 15th |
| 26 February 2025 | Ipswich Town | H | 3–2 | Morsy 22' (o.g.), De Ligt 26', Maguire 47' | 73,827 | 14th |
| 9 March 2025 | Arsenal | H | 1–1 | Fernandes 45+2' | 73,812 | 14th |
| 16 March 2025 | Leicester City | A | 3–0 | Højlund 28', Garnacho 67', Fernandes 90' | 31,773 | 13th |
| 1 April 2025 | Nottingham Forest | A | 0–1 | | 30,249 | 13th |
| 6 April 2025 | Manchester City | H | 0–0 | | 73,738 | 13th |
| 13 April 2025 | Newcastle United | A | 1–4 | Garnacho 37' | 52,252 | 14th |
| 20 April 2025 | Wolverhampton Wanderers | H | 0–1 | | 73,819 | 14th |
| 27 April 2025 | Bournemouth | A | 1–1 | Højlund 90+6' | 11,241 | 14th |
| 4 May 2025 | Brentford | A | 3–4 | Mount 14', Garnacho 82', Diallo 90+5' | 17,190 | 15th |
| 11 May 2025 | West Ham United | H | 0–2 | | 73,804 | 16th |
| 16 May 2025 | Chelsea | A | 0–1 | | 39,849 | 16th |
| 25 May 2025 | Aston Villa | H | 2–0 | Diallo 76', Eriksen 87' (pen.) | 73,839 | 15th |

=== League table ===
| Pos | Team | Pld | W | D | L | GF | GA | GD | Pts | Qualification or relegation |
|---|---|---|---|---|---|---|---|---|---|---|
| 13 | Everton | 38 | 11 | 15 | 12 | 42 | 44 | −2 | 48 | |
| 14 | West Ham United | 38 | 11 | 10 | 17 | 46 | 62 | −16 | 43 | |
| 15 | Manchester United | 38 | 11 | 9 | 18 | 44 | 54 | −10 | 42 | |
| 16 | Wolverhampton Wanderers | 38 | 12 | 6 | 20 | 54 | 69 | −15 | 42 | |
| 17 | Tottenham Hotspur | 38 | 11 | 5 | 22 | 64 | 65 | −1 | 38 | Qualification for the Champions League league phase (Note: Tottenham Hotspur qualified for the Champions League league phase as the 2024–25 UEFA Europa League winners.) |

Source: Premier League
Rules for classification: 1) Points; 2) Goal difference; 3) Goals scored; 4) If the champions, relegated teams or qualified teams for UEFA competitions cannot be determined by rules 1 to 3, rules 4.1 to 4.3 are applied – 4.1) Points gained in head-to-head record between such teams; 4.2) Away goals scored in head-to-head record between such teams; 4.3) Play-offs

== FA Cup ==
Manchester United went into the 2024–25 FA Cup as defending champions. For the first time, drawn games in all rounds from the First Round Proper onward were not replayed, instead proceeding straight to extra time and penalties.

| Date | Round | Opponents | H / A | Result F–A | Scorers | Attendance |
|---|---|---|---|---|---|---|
| 12 January 2025 | Third round | Arsenal | A | 1–1 (a.e.t.) (5–3 p) | Fernandes 52' | 60,109 |
| 7 February 2025 | Fourth round | Leicester City | H | 2–1 | Zirkzee 68', Maguire 90+3' | 73,693 |
| 2 March 2025 | Fifth round | Fulham | H | 1–1 (a.e.t.) (3–4 p) | Fernandes 71' | 67,614 |

== EFL Cup ==
As one of the English representatives in European competition in 2024–25, Manchester United entered the EFL Cup in the third round, which took place over two midweeks due to the extended European league phases. As United are in the Europa League, their tie was played in the week commencing 16 September. None of the clubs involved in the Champions League or Europa League could be drawn against each other. United were drawn against Barnsley in the third round to set up a first meeting in 15 years, which they comfortably won 7–0. In the fourth round, they were drawn at home against Leicester City. This was Ruud van Nistelrooy's first match as interim manager that they won 5–2. They were drawn away against Tottenham Hotspur in the quarter-finals. United lost the match 4–3 and were eliminated.

| Date | Round | Opponents | H / A | Result F–A | Scorers | Attendance |
|---|---|---|---|---|---|---|
| 17 September 2024 | Third round | Barnsley | H | 7–0 | Rashford (2) 16', 58', Antony 35' (pen.), Garnacho (2) 45+2', 49', Eriksen (2) 81', 85' | 72,063 |
| 30 October 2024 | Fourth round | Leicester City | H | 5–2 | Casemiro (2) 15', 39', Garnacho 28', Fernandes (2) 36', 59' | 73,470 |
| 19 December 2024 | Quarter-finals | Tottenham Hotspur | A | 3–4 | Zirkzee 63', Diallo 70', Evans 90+4' | 57,409 |

== UEFA Europa League ==
=== League phase ===
Manchester United qualified for the league stage of the Europa League as winners of the 2023–24 FA Cup. This is the competition's first season with a new format; United played eight games, four at home and four away, against eight different teams. After drawing their first three games, United won their remaining five to finish third in the league table and qualify directly for the round of 16 as the only remaining undefeated team in the League phase.

| Date | Opponents | H / A | Result F–A | Scorers | Attendance | League position |
|---|---|---|---|---|---|---|
| 25 September 2024 | Twente | H | 1–1 | Eriksen 35' | 73,069 | 10th |
| 3 October 2024 | Porto | A | 3–3 | Rashford 7', Højlund 20', Maguire 90+1' | 49,211 | 21st |
| 24 October 2024 | Fenerbahçe | A | 1–1 | Eriksen 15' | 41,443 | 21st |
| 7 November 2024 | PAOK | H | 2–0 | Diallo (2) 50', 77' | 73,174 | 15th |
| 28 November 2024 | Bodø/Glimt | H | 3–2 | Garnacho 1', Højlund (2) 45', 50' | 72,985 | 12th |
| 12 December 2024 | Viktoria Plzeň | A | 2–1 | Højlund (2) 62', 88' | 11,320 | 7th |
| 23 January 2025 | Rangers | H | 2–1 | Butland 52' (o.g.), Fernandes 90+2' | 73,288 | 4th |
| 30 January 2025 | FCSB | A | 2–0 | Dalot 60', Mainoo 68' | 50,128 | 3rd |

| Pos | Team | Pld | W | D | L | GF | GA | GD | Pts | Qualification |
|---|---|---|---|---|---|---|---|---|---|---|
| 1 | (Italian Football Federation) Lazio | 8 | 6 | 1 | 1 | 17 | 5 | +12 | 19 | Advance to round of 16 (seeded) |
| 2 | (Royal Spanish Football Federation) Athletic Bilbao | 8 | 6 | 1 | 1 | 15 | 7 | +8 | 19 | Advance to round of 16 (seeded) |
| 3 | (The Football Association) Manchester United | 8 | 5 | 3 | 0 | 16 | 9 | +7 | 18 | Advance to round of 16 (seeded) |
| 4 | (The Football Association) Tottenham Hotspur | 8 | 5 | 2 | 1 | 17 | 9 | +8 | 17 | Advance to round of 16 (seeded) |
| 5 | (German Football Association) Eintracht Frankfurt | 8 | 5 | 1 | 2 | 14 | 10 | +4 | 16 | Advance to round of 16 (seeded) |

Source: UEFA
Rules for classification: League phase tiebreakers

=== Knockout phase ===
As one of the top eight teams from the league phase, United qualified directly for the round of 16. In the knockout phase, United saw off Real Sociedad on aggregate in the Round of 16; secured a dramatic comeback victory against Lyon 7-6 on aggregate after extra time in the quarter-finals, having been at one stage on the brink of elimination; and comfortably beat Athletic Bilbao in 7-1 on aggregate the semi-finals to set up a meeting against fellow Premier League side Tottenham Hotspur in the final of the competition in Bilbao on 21 May 2025. In the final United would lose 1-0 to Tottenham thanks to goal from Spurs winger Brennan Johnson in the 42nd minute, meaning United had lost to Spurs in all four of the meetings between the respective clubs across all competitions during the 2024-25 season and as a result of losing this particular match would not play in any European Football competition the following season for the first time since the 2014–15 season.

| Date | Round | Opponents | H / A | Result F–A | Scorers | Attendance |
|---|---|---|---|---|---|---|
| 6 March 2025 | Round of 16; First leg | Real Sociedad | A | 1–1 | Zirkzee 57' | 34,391 |
| 13 March 2025 | Round of 16; Second leg | Real Sociedad | H | 4–1 | Fernandes (3) 16' (pen.), 50' (pen.), 87', Dalot 90+1' | 73,189 |
| 10 April 2025 | Quarter-final; First leg | Lyon | A | 2–2 | Yoro 45+5', Zirkzee 88' | 58,018 |
| 17 April 2025 | Quarter-final; Second leg | Lyon | H | 5–4 (a.e.t.) | Ugarte 10', Dalot 45+1', Fernandes 114' (pen.), Mainoo 120', Maguire 120+1' | 73,228 |
| 1 May 2025 | Semi-final; First leg | Athletic Bilbao | A | 3–0 | Casemiro 30', Fernandes (2) 37' (pen.), 45' | 51,980 |
| 8 May 2025 | Semi-final; Second leg | Athletic Bilbao | H | 4–1 | Mount (2) 72', 90+1', Casemiro 80', Højlund 85' | 73,298 |
| 21 May 2025 | Final | Tottenham Hotspur | N | 0–1 | | 49,924 |

== Squad statistics ==
| No. | Pos. | Name | League | | FA Cup | | EFL Cup | | Community Shield | | Europe | | Total | | Discipline | |
| No. | Pos. | Name | Apps | Goals | Apps | Goals | Apps | Goals | Apps | Goals | Apps | Goals | Apps | Goals | Yellow card | Red card |
|---|---|---|---|---|---|---|---|---|---|---|---|---|---|---|---|---|
| 1 | GK | (Turkey) Altay Bayındır | 4 | 0 | 1 | 0 | 3 | 0 | 0 | 0 | 2 | 0 | 10 | 0 | 1 | 0 |
| 2 | DF | (Sweden) Victor Lindelöf | 6(10) | 0 | 0(1) | 0 | 2 | 0 | 0 | 0 | 4(2) | 0 | 12(13) | 0 | 1 | 0 |
| 3 | DF | (Morocco) Noussair Mazraoui | 34(3) | 0 | 3 | 0 | 1(2) | 0 | 0 | 0 | 14 | 0 | 52(5) | 0 | 6 | 0 |
| 4 | DF | (Netherlands) Matthijs de Ligt | 25(4) | 2 | 2 | 0 | 1(1) | 0 | 0 | 0 | 8(1) | 0 | 36(6) | 2 | 5 | 0 |
| 5 | DF | (England) Harry Maguire | 19(8) | 1 | 3 | 1 | 1 | 0 | 1 | 0 | 6(2) | 2 | 30(10) | 4 | 10 | 0 |
| 6 | DF | (Argentina) Lisandro Martínez | 20 | 2 | 1 | 0 | 2 | 0 | 1 | 0 | 7(1) | 0 | 31(1) | 2 | 8 | 0 |
| 7 | MF | (England) Mason Mount | 8(9) | 1 | 0 | 0 | 0 | 0 | 1 | 0 | 2(7) | 2 | 11(16) | 3 | 5 | 0 |
| 8 | MF | (Portugal) Bruno Fernandes (c) | 35(1) | 8 | 3 | 2 | 2(1) | 2 | 1 | 0 | 14 | 7 | 55(2) | 19 | 8 | 3 |
| 9 | FW | (Denmark) Rasmus Højlund | 23(9) | 4 | 3 | 0 | 1(1) | 0 | 0 | 0 | 11(4) | 6 | 38(14) | 10 | 2 | 0 |
| 10 | FW | (England) Marcus Rashford | 12(3) | 4 | 0 | 0 | 2 | 2 | 1 | 0 | 4(2) | 1 | 19(5) | 7 | 4 | 0 |
| 11 | FW | (Netherlands) Joshua Zirkzee | 14(18) | 3 | 1(2) | 1 | 1(2) | 1 | 0 | 0 | 6(5) | 2 | 22(27) | 7 | 3 | 0 |
| 12 | DF | (Netherlands) Tyrell Malacia | 2(1) | 0 | 0(1) | 0 | 0 | 0 | 0 | 0 | 3(1) | 0 | 5(3) | 0 | 2 | 0 |
| 13 | DF | (Denmark) Patrick Dorgu | 10(2) | 0 | 1 | 0 | 0 | 0 | 0 | 0 | 7 | 0 | 18(2) | 0 | 4 | 1 |
| 14 | MF | (Denmark) Christian Eriksen | 11(12) | 1 | 1 | 0 | 2 | 2 | 0 | 0 | 5(4) | 2 | 19(16) | 5 | 4 | 0 |
| 15 | DF | (France) Leny Yoro | 12(9) | 0 | 2(1) | 0 | 1 | 0 | 0 | 0 | 7(1) | 1 | 22(11) | 1 | 7 | 0 |
| 16 | FW | (Ivory Coast) Amad Diallo | 20(6) | 8 | 1(1) | 0 | 0(3) | 1 | 1 | 0 | 6(5) | 2 | 28(15) | 11 | 6 | 0 |
| 17 | FW | (Argentina) Alejandro Garnacho | 23(13) | 6 | 1(2) | 0 | 2(1) | 3 | 0(1) | 1 | 10(5) | 1 | 36(22) | 11 | 5 | 0 |
| 18 | MF | (Brazil) Casemiro | 18(6) | 1 | 0(2) | 0 | 2 | 2 | 1 | 0 | 10(3) | 2 | 31(11) | 5 | 8 | 0 |
| 20 | DF | (Portugal) Diogo Dalot | 31(2) | 0 | 3 | 0 | 3 | 0 | 1 | 0 | 11(2) | 3 | 49(4) | 3 | 6 | 1 |
| 21 | FW | (Brazil) Antony | 0(8) | 0 | 0 | 0 | 2 | 1 | 0 | 0 | 1(3) | 0 | 3(11) | 1 | 0 | 0 |
| 23 | DF | (England) Luke Shaw | 4(3) | 0 | 0 | 0 | 0 | 0 | 0 | 0 | 1(4) | 0 | 5(7) | 0 | 1 | 0 |
| 24 | GK | (Cameroon) André Onana | 34 | 0 | 2 | 0 | 0 | 0 | 1 | 0 | 13 | 0 | 50 | 0 | 1 | 0 |
| 25 (Note: Jadon Sancho wore number 25 until his departure to Chelsea on 30 August 2024. Manuel Ugarte replaced him as number 25.) | MF | (Uruguay) Manuel Ugarte | 22(7) | 1 | 3 | 0 | 3 | 0 | 0 | 0 | 8(2) | 1 | 36(9) | 2 | 15 | 0 |
| 26 | DF | (England) Ayden Heaven | 2(2) | 0 | 0(1) | 0 | 0 | 0 | 0 | 0 | 1 | 0 | 3(3) | 0 | 1 | 0 |
| 35 | DF | (Northern Ireland) Jonny Evans | 3(4) | 0 | 0 | 0 | 1(2) | 1 | 1 | 0 | 1(1) | 0 | 6(7) | 1 | 1 | 0 |
| 37 | MF | (England) Kobbie Mainoo | 19(6) | 0 | 2 | 0 | 0(1) | 0 | 1 | 0 | 1(7) | 2 | 23(14) | 2 | 7 | 0 |
| 39 | MF | (Scotland) Scott McTominay | 0(2) | 0 | 0 | 0 | 0 | 0 | 0(1) | 0 | 0 | 0 | 0(3) | 0 | 0 | 0 |
| 41 | DF | (England) Harry Amass | 4(1) | 0 | 0 | 0 | 0 | 0 | 0 | 0 | 0(2) | 0 | 4(3) | 0 | 0 | 0 |
| 43 | MF | (England) Toby Collyer | 0(6) | 0 | 0(1) | 0 | 1 | 0 | 0(1) | 0 | 2(2) | 0 | 3(10) | 0 | 1 | 0 |
| 55 | DF | (England) Tyler Fredricson | 2 | 0 | 0 | 0 | 0 | 0 | 0 | 0 | 0 | 0 | 2 | 0 | 0 | 0 |
| 56 | FW | (Denmark) Chido Obi | 1(6) | 0 | 0(1) | 0 | 0 | 0 | 0 | 0 | 0 | 0 | 1(7) | 0 | 1 | 0 |
| Own goals | | | — | 2 | — | 0 | — | 0 | — | 0 | — | 1 | – | 3 | N/A | |

== Transfers ==
=== In ===
| Date | Pos. | Name | From | Fee | Ref. |
|---|---|---|---|---|---|
| 14 July 2024 | FW | (Netherlands) Joshua Zirkzee | (Italy) Bologna | Undisclosed (Note: Reported as £36.5 million) | |
| 18 July 2024 | DF | (France) Leny Yoro | (France) Lille | Undisclosed (Note: Reported as £52.18 million with £6.73 million in add-ons) | |
| 13 August 2024 | DF | (Netherlands) Matthijs de Ligt | (Germany) Bayern Munich | Undisclosed (Note: Reported as £38.5 million with £4.3 million in add-ons) | |
| 13 August 2024 | DF | (Morocco) Noussair Mazraoui | (Germany) Bayern Munich | Undisclosed (Note: Reported as £12.8 million with £4.3 million in add-ons) | |
| 30 August 2024 | MF | (Mali) Sékou Koné | (Mali) Guidars FC | Undisclosed (Note: Reported as £1 million plus add-ons) | |
| 30 August 2024 | MF | (Uruguay) Manuel Ugarte | (France) Paris Saint-Germain | Undisclosed (Note: Reported as £42.1 million with £8.4 million in add-ons) | |
| 2 September 2024 | MF | (England) Tommy Rowe | Unattached (Note: Most recently played for Doncaster Rovers) | Free | |
| 1 February 2025 | DF | (England) Ayden Heaven | (England) Arsenal | Undisclosed (Note: Reported as £1.5 million) | |
| 2 February 2025 | DF | (Denmark) Patrick Dorgu | (Italy) Lecce | Undisclosed (Note: Reported as £25 million with £4.1 million in add-ons) | |

=== Out ===
| Date | Pos. | Name | To | Fee | Ref. |
|---|---|---|---|---|---|
| 26 May 2024 | DF | (Spain) Álvaro Carreras | (Portugal) Benfica | Undisclosed (Note: Reported as £5 million, plus £2.5 million in add-ons) | |
| 30 June 2024 | MF | (England) Tom Huddlestone | Retired | | |
| 30 June 2024 | FW | (England) Charlie McNeill | Unattached (Note: Joined Sheffield Wednesday on 10 July 2024) | Free | |
| 30 June 2024 | DF | (France) Raphaël Varane | Unattached (Note: Joined Como on 30 July 2024) | Free | |
| 30 June 2024 | MF | (England) Shola Shoretire | Unattached (Note: Joined PAOK on 31 July 2024) | Free | |
| 30 June 2024 | FW | (France) Anthony Martial | Unattached (Note: Joined AEK Athens on 19 September 2024) | Free | |
| 30 June 2024 | GK | (England) Kie Plumley | Unattached (Note: Joined Hartley Wintney on 6 September 2024) | Free | |
| 30 June 2024 | DF | (England) Marcus Lawrence | Unattached | Released | |
| 30 June 2024 | DF | (England) Brandon Williams | Unattached | Released | |
| 1 July 2024 (Note: Transfer agreed on 11 June 2024) | MF | (England) Omari Forson | (Italy) Monza | Free | |
| 11 July 2024 | MF | (Netherlands) Donny van de Beek | (Spain) Girona | Undisclosed (Note: Reported as £420,600, rising to £7.6 million with potential add-ons) | |
| 15 July 2024 | DF | (Democratic Republic of the Congo) Willy Kambwala | (Spain) Villarreal | Undisclosed (Note: Reported as £4.63 million, rising to £9.68 million with potential add-ons) | |
| 18 July 2024 | FW | (England) Mason Greenwood | (France) Marseille | Undisclosed (Note: Reported as £26.6 million) | |
| 13 August 2024 | DF | (England) Aaron Wan-Bissaka | (England) West Ham United | Undisclosed (Note: Reported as £15 million) | |
| 21 August 2024 | FW | (Uruguay) Facundo Pellistri | (Greece) Panathinaikos | Undisclosed (Note: Reported as £5.1 million, plus £1.7 million with potential add-ons) | |
| 22 August 2024 | MF | (Poland) Maxi Oyedele | (Poland) Legia Warsaw | Undisclosed | |
| 23 August 2024 | DF | (England) Will Fish | (Wales) Cardiff City | Undisclosed (Note: Reported as £1 million rising to £3 million with potential add-ons) | |
| 28 August 2024 | MF | (Tunisia) Hannibal Mejbri | (England) Burnley | Undisclosed (Note: Reported as £5.4 million rising to £9.4 million with potential add-ons) | |
| 30 August 2024 | MF | (Scotland) Scott McTominay | (Italy) Napoli | Undisclosed (Note: Reported as £25.7 million) | |
| 4 February 2025 | MF | (England) Ruben Curley | (England) Stoke City | Free | |

=== Loan out ===
| Date from | Date to | Pos. | Name | To | Ref. |
|---|---|---|---|---|---|
| 25 July 2024 | 8 January 2025 (Note: Hugill was originally loaned out for the entire season, but was recalled early on 8 January 2025.) | FW | (England) Joe Hugill | (England) Wigan Athletic | |
| 9 August 2024 | 7 January 2025 (Note: Wooster, Harrison and Myles were recalled from their season-long loan spells early on 7 January 2025.) | GK | (England) Tom Wooster | (England) Farsley Celtic | |
| 21 August 2024 | End of season | GK | (Czech Republic) Radek Vítek | (Austria) Blau-Weiß Linz | |
| 29 August 2024 | End of season | DF | (England) Rhys Bennett | (England) Fleetwood Town | |
| 30 August 2024 | 7 January 2025 | GK | (England) Elyh Harrison | (England) Chester | |
| 30 August 2024 | End of season | DF | (England) Sonny Aljofree | (England) Accrington Stanley | |
| 30 August 2024 | End of season | DF | (England) James Nolan | (Scotland) Inverness Caledonian Thistle | |
| 30 August 2024 | 7 January 2025 | GK | (England) Tom Myles | (England) Runcorn Linnets | |
| 30 August 2024 | End of season | FW | (England) Jadon Sancho | (England) Chelsea | |
| 30 August 2024 | 1 January 2025 | GK | (England) Cameron Byrne-Hughes | (England) Bolton Wanderers | |
| 10 January 2025 | End of season | FW | (England) Ethan Ennis | (England) Doncaster Rovers | |
| 17 January 2025 | End of season | FW | (England) Joe Hugill | (England) Carlisle United | |
| 17 January 2025 | End of season | FW | (England) Ethan Williams | (England) Cheltenham Town | |
| 25 January 2025 | End of season | FW | (Brazil) Antony | (Spain) Real Betis | |
| 25 January 2025 | End of season | DF | (Scotland) Jack Kingdon | (England) Rochdale | |
| 25 January 2025 | End of season | FW | (England) Ethan Wheatley | (England) Walsall | |
| 31 January 2025 | End of season | MF | (England) Dan Gore | (England) Rotherham United | |
| 2 February 2025 | End of season | FW | (England) Marcus Rashford | (England) Aston Villa | |
| 4 February 2025 | End of season | DF | (Scotland) Louis Jackson | (England) Tranmere Rovers | |
| 4 February 2025 | End of season | FW | (England) Sam Mather | (England) Tranmere Rovers | |
| 4 February 2025 | End of season | DF | (Netherlands) Tyrell Malacia | (Netherlands) PSV Eindhoven | |

== See also ==
- 2024–25 Manchester United W.F.C. season
