= Sonny Aljofree =

English footballer (born 2004)

Personal information
- Full name: Sonny Aljofree
- Date of birth: 19 December 2004 (age 21)
- Place of birth: Plymouth, England
- Height: 1.86 m (6 ft 1 in)
- Position: Defender

Team information
- Current team: Rotherham United
- Number: 14

Youth career
- –2022: Manchester United

Senior career*
Years	Team	Apps	(Gls)
2022–2026	Manchester United	0	(0)
2023	→ Altrincham (loan)	0	(0)
2024	→ Altrincham (loan)	0	(0)
2024–2025	→ Accrington Stanley (loan)	25	(3)
2025–2026	→ Notts County (loan)	9	(1)
2026–	Rotherham United	14	(0)
- * Club domestic league appearances and goals as of 14:07, 22 November 2026 (UTC)

Sonny Aljofree (born 19 December 2004) is an English professional footballer who plays as a defender for EFL League Two club Rotherham United.

== Career ==
=== Manchester United ===
Born in Plymouth, Aljofree began his career with Manchester United, training with the first-team in August 2022.

He moved on loan to non-League club Altrincham in February 2023 alongside teammates Joe Hugill and Maxi Oyedele, whilst continuing to train with their parent club. He turned professional in May 2023.

He returned on loan to Altrincham in February 2024. Due to this second loan, he was prevented from playing with the Manchester United first-team.

In August 2024, Aljofree signed on loan for Accrington Stanley.

On 10 July 2025, Aljofree signed on a season-long loan for Notts County. He was recalled in January 2026.

On 10 June 2026, United announced that Aljofree would depart from the club following the expiration of his contract.

=== Rotherham United ===
On 7 August 2026, following a successful trial period, Aljofree joined League Two club Rotherham United on an initial two-year deal.

== Personal life ==
His father is former footballer Hasney Aljofree. Sonny is eligible to play for the Singapore national team, through his paternal grandfather, Hasney's father.

== Career statistics ==
As of match played on 21 November 2026

Appearances and goals by club, season and competition
Club	Season	League			FA Cup		EFL Cup		Other		Total	
Club	Season	Division	Apps	Goals	Apps	Goals	Apps	Goals	Apps	Goals	Apps	Goals
Manchester United	2022–23	Premier League	0	0	0	0	0	0	0	0	0	0
Manchester United	2023–24	Premier League	0	0	0	0	0	0	0	0	0	0
Manchester United	2024–25	Premier League	0	0	0	0	0	0	0	0	0	0
Manchester United	2025–26	Premier League	0	0	0	0	0	0	0	0	0	0
Manchester United	Total		0	0	0	0	0	0	0	0	0	0
Altrincham (loan)	2022–23	National League	0	0	0	0	0	0	0	0	0	0
Altrincham (loan)	2023–24	National League	0	0	0	0	0	0	0	0	0	0
Accrington Stanley (loan)	2024–25	League Two	25	3	2	0	0	0	0	0	27	3
Notts County (loan)	2025–26	League Two	9	1	0	0	1	0	1 (Note: Appearance(s) in the EFL Trophy)	0	11	1
Rotherham United	2026–27	League Two	14	0	1	1	1	0	1	0	17	1
Career total			48	4	3	1	2	0	2	0	55	5

== Honours ==
Manchester United U18

- FA Youth Cup: 2021–22
