= Louis Jackson (footballer, born 2005) =

Scottish professional footballer (born 2005)

Personal information
- Full name: Louis Paul Jackson
- Date of birth: 18 September 2005 (age 21)
- Place of birth: Oldham, England
- Height: 1.91 m (6 ft 3 in)
- Position: Defender

Team information
- Current team: St Mirren
- Number: 6

Youth career
- 2010–2024: Manchester United

Senior career*
Years	Team	Apps	(Gls)
2024–2026	Manchester United	0	(0)
2025	→ Tranmere Rovers (loan)	0	(0)
2025–2026	→ Solihull Moors (loan)	2	(0)
2026–	St Mirren	0	(0)

International career^{‡}
2021	England U16	1	(0)
2022	Scotland U17	4	(0)
2022–2023	Scotland U18	3	(0)
2023–2024	Scotland U19	8	(1)
- * Club domestic league appearances and goals as of 14:58, 5 February 2025 (UTC) ‡ National team caps and goals as of 14:58, 5 February 2025 (UTC)

Louis Paul Jackson (born 18 September 2005) is a professional footballer who plays as a defender for Scottish Premiership club St Mirren.

== Club career ==
Born in Oldham, but brought up in Trafford, Jackson became a season-ticket holder at Manchester United at five years-old. He joined the Manchester United academy at ten years-old, and at the age of 15, he became the youngest player to ever feature for the club's under-23 team. He was part of the United youth side that won the FA Youth Cup in 2022. In October 2022, he signed his first professional contract with the club. Jackson was first named on the bench for the senior team in the semi-finals of the 23–24 FA Cup against Coventry City. Although he was also named on the substitutes bench against Sheffield United, Burnley, and Crystal Palace in the Premier League later that season, Jackson is yet to make his senior debut.

In February 2025, he joined EFL League Two side Tranmere Rovers on loan for the rest of the 2024–25 season, but never made an appearance for the club.

In August 2025, he joined National League side Solihull Moors on loan for the rest of the 2025–26 season.

On 30 August 2026, Jackson moved from Manchester United to Scottish Premiership side St Mirren F.C. on a permanent deal.

== International career ==
Born in Oldham, England, Jackson has represented both England and Scotland at youth level. He was handed his international debut by Omer Riza, the England U16 coach at the time, in an U16 friendly game against Northern Ireland that England won 6–0. Despite that, he has since opted to represent Scotland at U17, U18, and U19 levels. Jackson currently plays for Scotland U19s. He scored his first international goal in a 3–1 win over Andorra U19 in the 2023–2024 UEFA Euro U19 Championship Qualifiers, on the 18 November 2023.

== Style of play ==
Jackson has been described as a "calm and composed" defender.

== Career statistics ==
=== Club ===
As of match played 2 September 2025

Club	Season	League			FA Cup		League cup (Note: Includes National League Cup, EFL Cup)		Continental		Other		Total	
Club	Season	Division	Apps	Goals	Apps	Goals	Apps	Goals	Apps	Goals	Apps	Goals	Apps	Goals
Manchester United U21	2023–24	—			—		—		—		0	0	0	0
Manchester United U21	2024–25	—			—		3	0	—		2 (Note: Appearance(s) in EFL Trophy)	1	5	1
Manchester United U21	Total		—		—		3	0	—		2	1	5	1
Manchester United	2023–24	Premier League	0	0	0	0	0	0	0	0	—		0	0
Manchester United	2024–25	Premier League	0	0	0	0	0	0	0	0	0	0	0	0
Manchester United	2025–26	Premier League	0	0	0	0	0	0	—		—		0	0
Manchester United	Total		0	0	0	0	0	0	0	0	0	0	0	0
Tranmere Rovers (loan)	2024–25	League Two	0	0	—		—		—		—		0	0
Solihull Moors (loan)	2025–26	National League	2	0	0	0	1	0	—		0	0	2	0
Career total			2	0	0	0	4	0	0	0	2	1	8	1

== Honours ==
Manchester United U18

- FA Youth Cup: 2021–22
