= Ethan Young =

English footballer

Personal information
- Full name: Ethan Kai Young
- Date of birth: 13 January 2004 (age 22)
- Place of birth: Peterborough, England
- Height: 1.93 m (6 ft 4 in)
- Position: Defender

Team information
- Current team: Peterborough Sports

Youth career
- –2020: Lincoln City
- 2020–2022: Scunthorpe United

Senior career*
Years	Team	Apps	(Gls)
2022–2024	Scunthorpe United	8	(0)
2023	→ Yaxley (loan)	6	(0)
2024	Warrington Rylands	?	(?)
2024	Alvechurch	3	(0)
2024	Soham Town Rangers	2	(0)
2024	Stamford	0	(0)
2024–2025	Shepshed Dynamo	9	(0)
2025–	Peterborough Sports	1	(0)
2025	→ Downham Town (loan)	9	(0)
2025–2026	→ Bromsgrove Sporting (loan)	3	(0)
2026–	→ Quorn (loan)	2	(0)
- * Club domestic league appearances and goals as of 12:30, 30 April 2026 (UTC)

Ethan Kai Young (born 13 January 2004) is an English professional footballer who plays as a defender for Quorn, on loan from Peterborough Sports.

== Playing career ==
Young joined Scunthorpe United in 2020 as a youth team scholar. He made his first appearance for Scunthorpe on 9 April 2022 in a 4-0 defeat to Mansfield Town. Only six days later, Young made his first start for the club in a defeat away to Leyton Orient.

On 22 April 2022, Young signed his first professional contract with Scunthorpe alongside fellow academy graduate Jack Moore-Billam. It was a one-year contract with the option to extend for a further season.

On 17 March 2023, Young was loaned out to Northern Premier League Division One Midland side Yaxley. He made his first appearance one day later in a 2-0 defeat to Cambridge City.

In February 2024, he joined Warrington Rylands.

In March 2024, Young joined Alvechurch for the remainder of the season.

Young signed for Soham Town Rangers in August 2024.

In August 2025, Young joined National League North club Peterborough Sports.

Young joined Downham Town on loan in November 2025, making 9 appearances.

In December 2025, Young joined Bromsgrove Sporting on a one month loan deal.

In February 2026, Young joined Quorn on loan for the remainder of the season.

== Style of play ==
Young is a left-footed central defender. He can also play as a left fullback.

== Personal life ==
He was a former student at Stamford Welland Academy.
