= Peterborough Sports F.C. =

Association football club in England

Coordinates: 52.5940°N 0.2547°W

Peterborough Sports
- Full name: Peterborough Sports Football Club
- Nickname: The Turbines
- Founded: 1908
- Ground: Lincoln Road, Peterborough
- Capacity: 2,300
- Chairman: Tim Woodward
- Manager: Mark Ducket
- League: Southern League Premier Division Central
- 2025–26: National League North, 23rd of 24 (relegated)
- Website: psfc.co.uk

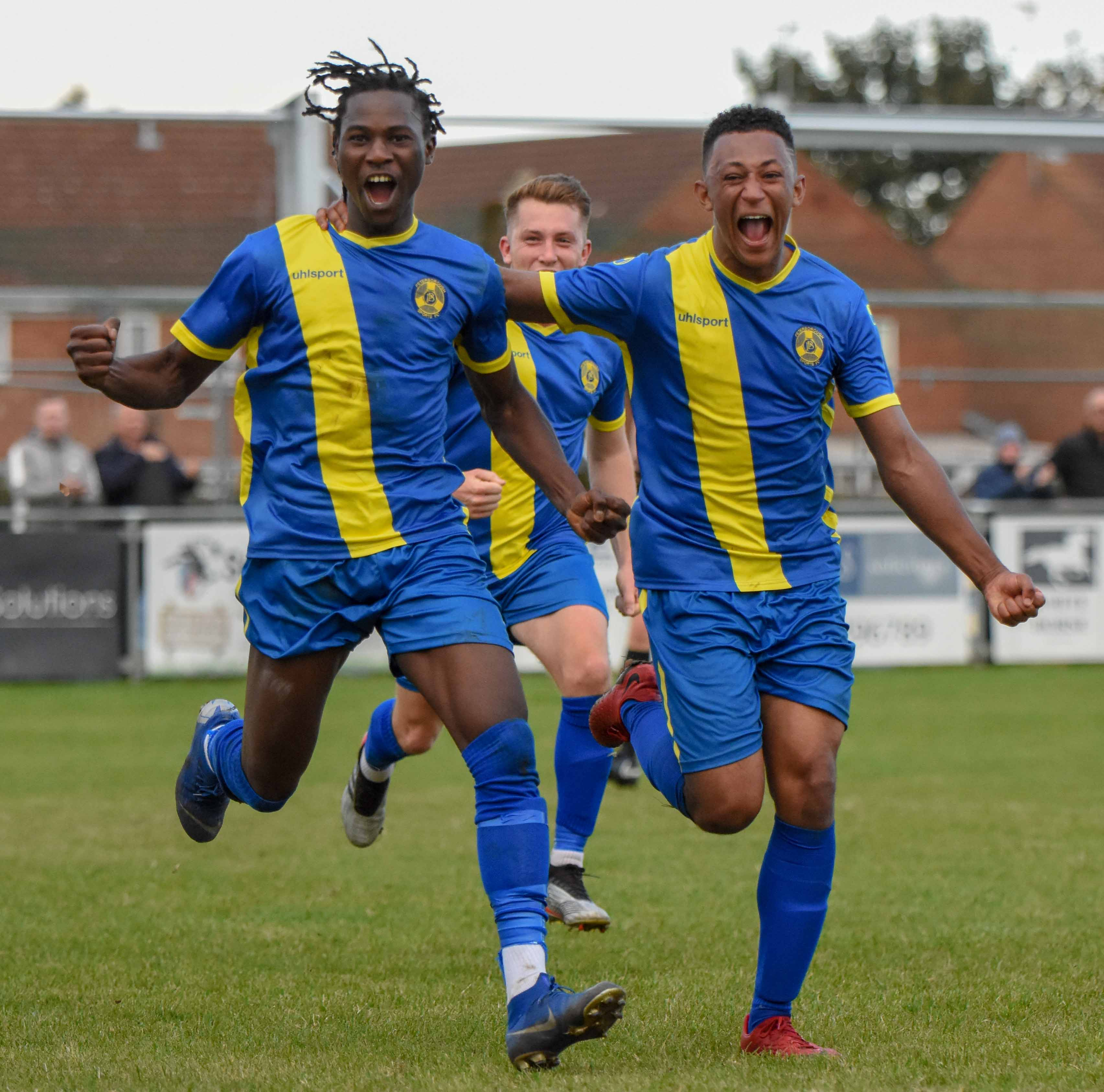
Maniche Sani scoring during Peterborough Sports' FA Cup third qualifying round match against Guiseley

Peterborough Sports Football Club is an English football club based in Peterborough, Cambridgeshire, England. The club are currently members of the Southern League Premier Division Central and play at Lincoln Road.

== History ==
The club was established in 1908 as Brotherhood Engineering Works. They joined the Northants League (which later became the United Counties League) for the 1919–20 season, winning the league in their first season. However, they left at the end of the 1922–23 season, transferring to Division Three of the Peterborough & District League, which they won in 1925–26, earning promotion to Division Two. The club was dormant in 1929–30 and 1932–33, after which they dropped into Division Three North. Despite only finishing eleventh in 1936–37, they were elevated to Division Two for the 1937–38 season. After World War II the club were placed in Division One, where they remained until finishing bottom of the table in 1948–49, resulting in relegation to Division Two. In 1952 the division was renamed Division One as the division above became the Premier Division, but the club finished bottom in 1952–53 and were relegated to the new Division Two. In 1963–64 they were relegated again to Division Three South, but returned to Division Two after a single season.

At the end of the 1973–74 season Brotherhoods Engineering Works were relegated to Division Three South for a second time, but returned to Division Two after winning the Division Three South title in 1975–76. Relegated again in 1979–80, the club returned to Division Two at the first attempt as Division Three South champions, and were promoted to Division One at the end of the 1982–83 season after finishing third. The 1987–88 season saw the club finish as Division One runners-up and earn promotion to the Premier Division. In 1999 the club changed its name to Bearings Direct, and then again in 2001 to Peterborough Sports. In 2006–07 they won the Premier Division, and in 2012–13 were promoted to Division One of the United Counties League after finishing third.

In 2015–16 Peterborough Sports were Division One champions, earning promotion to the Premier Division. They also won the League Cup, beating Holbeach United on penalties in the final, as well as the Northants Junior Cup and the Hinchingbrooke Cup. The following season saw them win the Premier Division with 112 points, earning promotion to Division One South of the Northern Premier League; they also retained the Hinchingbrooke Cup. In 2018 the club were transferred to Division One Central of the Southern League. In 2018–19 the club were Division One Central champions, earning promotion to the Premier Division Central. They finished as runners-up in 2021–22, qualifying for the promotion play-offs. After beating Alvechurch in the semi-finals, the club defeated Coalville Town 2–0 in the final to earn promotion to the National League North.

== Current squad ==
As of 13 April 2026

Note: Flags indicate national team as defined under FIFA eligibility rules; some limited exceptions apply. Players may hold more than one non-FIFA nationality.

| No. | Pos. | Nation | Player |
|---|---|---|---|
| 1 | GK | ENG | Peter Crook |
| 2 | DF | ITA | Benjamin Mensah |
| 3 | DF | ENG | Aaron Powell |
| 4 | DF | ENG | Ryan Fryatt |
| 5 | DF | ENG | Ashton Fox |
| 6 | DF | ENG | Zach Willis (on loan from Birmingham City) |
| 7 | FW | ENG | Kaine Felix |
| 8 | MF | ENG | Elliott Whitehouse (on loan from Macclesfield) |
| 9 | FW | ENG | Mark Jones |
| 10 | MF | ENG | Dan Jarvis |
| 11 | FW | ENG | Max Booth |
| 12 | GK | ENG | Sam Edwards |
| 14 | MF | ENG | Sam McLintock |
| 17 | MF | ENG | Luca Miller |
| 18 | FW | GAM | Mustapha Carayol |

| No. | Pos. | Nation | Player |
|---|---|---|---|
| 19 | MF | ENG | Sam Bayly |
| 20 | MF | ENG | Charlie Hickingbottom |
| 21 | FW | MSR | Josiah Dyer |
| 22 | FW | ENG | Shaun Jeffers (on loan from Bedford Town) |
| 23 | DF | ENG | Michael Gash |
| 24 | DF | ENG | Ethan Young |
| 25 | DF | IRL | Kevin Joshua |
| 26 | MF | ENG | Jez Davies |
| 27 | FW | ENG | Shaq Coulthirst |
| 28 | DF | ENG | Marcel Oakley |
| 30 | FW | GUY | Maliq Cadogan |
| 32 | DF | ENG | Connor Wood |
| 33 | FW | ENG | Ben Beresford |
| 37 | DF | ENG | Richard Faakye |
| 39 | DF | ENG | Anthony Stewart |

== Coaching staff ==
| Position | Name |
|---|---|
| Manager | Mark Ducket |
| Assistant Manager | (England) Wayne Scott |
| {{{p}}} | {{{s}}} |
| {{{p}}} | {{{s}}} |
| Coach | (England) Michael Frew |
| Physio | (England) Natalie Halliday |
| Kitman | (England) Adam Woodward |

=== Managerial history ===
| Period | Manager |
|---|---|
| –2012 | (England) Chris Bartlett |
| 2012–2014 | (England) Seamus Morgan |
| 2014–2015 | (England) Chris Plummer |
| 2015–2023 | (England) Jimmy Dean |
| 2023–2025 | (England) Michael Gash and Luke Steele |
| 2025–2026 | (England) Phil Brown |
| 2026 | (England) Michael Gash |
| 2026 | (England) Graham Drury |

== Honours ==
- Southern League
  - Division One Central champions 2018–19
- United Counties League
  - Champions 1919–20, 2016–17
  - Division One champions 2015–16
  - League Cup winners 2015–16
- Peterborough & District League
  - Premier Division champions 2006–07
  - Division Three champions 1925–26, 1980–81
  - Division Three South champions 1975–76
- Northants County Cup
  - Winners 2021–22
- Maunsell Cup
  - Winners 2021–22
- Northants Junior Cup
  - Winners 2006–07, 2015–16
- Hitchingbrooke Cup
  - Winners 2015–16, 2016–17

== Records ==
- Best FA Cup performance: Fourth qualifying round, 2019–20, 2021–22, 2024–25
- Best FA Trophy performance: Quarter-finals, 2023–24
- Best FA Vase performance: Fourth round, 2016–17

== See also ==
- Peterborough Sports F.C. players
- Peterborough Sports F.C. managers
