= Ayden Heaven =

English footballer (born 2006)

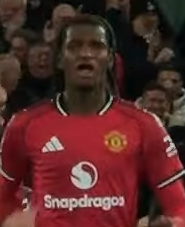
- Heaven with Manchester United in 2025

Personal information
- Full name: Ayden Edford Heaven
- Date of birth: 22 September 2006 (age 20)
- Place of birth: Islington, England
- Height: 6 ft 2 in (1.89 m)
- Position: Centre-back

Team information
- Current team: Manchester United
- Number: 26

Youth career
- West Ham United
- 2019–2024: Arsenal

Senior career*
Years	Team	Apps	(Gls)
2024–2025	Arsenal	0	(0)
2025–	Manchester United	26	(0)

International career^{‡}
2024	England U18	2	(0)
2024	England U19	2	(0)
2025–	England U20	7	(1)
- * Club domestic league appearances and goals as of 19:53, 8 November 2026 (UTC) ‡ National team caps and goals as of 07:54, 14 November 2026 (UTC)

Ayden Edford Heaven (born 22 September 2006) is an English professional footballer who plays as a centre-back for Premier League club Manchester United.

Heaven played in the youth academies of West Ham United and Arsenal. He made one first-team appearance for Arsenal before joining Manchester United in February 2025. Heaven has played youth international football for England up to under-20 level.

== Club career ==
=== Arsenal ===
Heaven joined the academy at West Ham United when he was eight years old, where he stayed for four years. After a trial with Chelsea, he joined the academy system at Arsenal at the age of 13 in 2019, the club he had supported since childhood. He signed a scholarship contract with Arsenal in the summer of 2023. He trained with the Arsenal first-team squad on occasion during the 2023–24 season.

Heaven was heavily involved with Arsenal first-team training during the 2024 summer pre-season, and was one of three youngsters, along with Myles Lewis-Skelly and Ethan Nwaneri, individually praised by manager Mikel Arteta in August 2024. The following month, he was included amongst the match-day substitutes for the North London derby against Tottenham Hotspur in the Premier League. He made his Arsenal debut on 30 October 2024, away at Preston North End in the EFL Cup, helping Arsenal win 3–0.

=== Manchester United ===
On 1 February 2025, Heaven joined Manchester United for an undisclosed fee, signing a four-and-a-half-year contract with an option for an extra year. He made his first-team debut coming on as a substitute against Fulham in the 2024–25 FA Cup fifth round. On 9 March, in the Premier League, he debuted for Manchester United against Arsenal. He came on as a second-half substitute, replacing Leny Yoro. He made his first start for Manchester United on 13 March 2025, in the Europa League round of 16 match against Real Sociedad.

On 16 March 2025, he made his first Premier League start in an away match against Leicester City. He suffered an ankle injury after colliding with the goalpost and was out for two months. He was substituted briefly during United's 1-0 loss at Stamford Bridge to Chelsea. On 25 October 2025, Heaven assisted his first goal in professional football, playing a pass to Bryan Mbeumo, who scored the final goal in a 4–2 victory against Brighton & Hove Albion, sealing United's third consecutive win in the league. He won his first Premier League Player of the Match award on 26 December 2025, helping the club keep a clean sheet in a 1–0 win over Newcastle United. On 18 April 2026, Heaven made his first start under Michael Carrick, keeping a clean sheet in a 1–0 win over Chelsea.

== International career ==
Heaven has played youth international football for England at under-18, under-19 and under-20 levels. He is also eligible to represent Ghana at international level.

In May 2024, Heaven made his debut for the England under-18 team against Northern Ireland. On 5 September 2025, Heaven made his England under-20 debut during a 2–1 defeat to Italy at the SMH Group Stadium.

== Style of play ==
A naturally left-footed defender, Heaven is often deployed as a left-sided centre back in Manchester United's backline, where he displays his channel defending and capability on the ball.

== Personal life ==
Born in London, Heaven is of Ghanaian descent. His mother, Lisa, is his manager.

== Career statistics ==
As of match played 8 November 2026

Appearances and goals by club, season and competition
Club	Season	League			FA Cup		EFL Cup		Europe		Other		Total	
Club	Season	Division	Apps	Goals	Apps	Goals	Apps	Goals	Apps	Goals	Apps	Goals	Apps	Goals
Arsenal U21	2023–24	—			—		—		—		2 (Note: Appearance(s) in EFL Trophy)	0	2	0
Arsenal U21	2024–25	—			—		—		—		1	0	1	0
Arsenal U21	Total		—		—		—		—		3	0	3	0
Arsenal	2024–25	Premier League	0	0	0	0	1	0	0	0	—		1	0
Manchester United	2024–25	Premier League	4	0	1	0	—		1 (Note: Appearance in UEFA Europa League)	0	—		6	0
Manchester United	2025–26	Premier League	17	0	0	0	1	0	—		—		18	0
Manchester United	2026–27	Premier League	5	0	0	0	1	0	2 (Note: Appearances in UEFA Champions League)	0	—		8	0
Manchester United	Total		26	0	1	0	2	0	3	0	—		32	0
Career total			26	0	1	0	3	0	3	0	3	0	36	0

== Honours ==
Manchester United

- UEFA Europa League runner-up: 2024–25
