= Aaron Atkinson =

English footballer

Personal information
- Date of birth: 28 August 2005 (age 21)
- Height: 1.76 m (5 ft 9 in)
- Position: Midfielder

Team information
- Current team: Barnsley

Youth career
- 20??–2008: Manchester City
- 2008–2009: Blackburn Rovers
- 2009–2021: Oldham Athletic
- 2021–2023: Barnsley

Senior career*
Years	Team	Apps	(Gls)
2023–	Barnsley	0	(0)
- * Club domestic league appearances and goals as of 21:38, 24 December 2023 (UTC)

Aaron Atkinson (born 28 August 2005) is an English professional footballer who plays as a midfielder for EFL League One club Barnsley.

== Career ==
Atkinson signed a two-year contract with EFL League One club Barnsley from Oldham Athletic, following a successful trial period; Oldham were paid an undisclosed fee. He had spent his youth in the Academy at Manchester City, before joining the Academy at Blackburn Rovers, later joining Oldham Athletic at the under-15 level. He made his first-team debut for Barnsley on 21 November 2023, in a 5–1 defeat at Bradford City in the EFL Trophy.

== Style of play ==
Atkinson is a "creative, energetic midfielder".

== Career statistics ==
As of match played 21 November 2023

Appearances and goals by club, season and competition
Club	Season	League			FA Cup		EFL Cup		Other		Total	
Club	Season	Division	Apps	Goals	Apps	Goals	Apps	Goals	Apps	Goals	Apps	Goals
Barnsley	2023–24	EFL League One	0	0	0	0	0	0	1 (Note: Appearance/s in the EFL Trophy)	0	1	0
Career total			0	0	0	0	0	0	1	0	1	0
