= Leslie Adekoya =

Irish association football player

Personal information
- Full name: Leslie Toluwani Adetokunbo Okikiola Ayomipo Adekoya
- Date of birth: 18 April 2004 (age 22)
- Place of birth: Dublin, Ireland
- Position: Forward

Team information
- Current team: Without club

Youth career
- 2020–2022: Accrington Stanley

Senior career*
Years	Team	Apps	(Gls)
2022–2024	Accrington Stanley	14	(0)
2022	→ Witton Albion (loan)	6	(0)
2024–2025	Warrington Rylands	5	(1)
2025–2025	Runcorn Linnets	1	(0)
- * Club domestic league appearances and goals as of 12:35, 29 January 2025 (UTC) ‡ National team caps and goals as of 19:28, 29 November 2022 (UTC)

Leslie Toluwani Adetokunbo Okikiola Ayomipo Adekoya (born 18 April 2004) is an Irish professional footballer who most recently played for Northern Premier League Division One West club Runcorn Linnets leaving after one appearance

== Career ==
Adekoya is a youth product of Accrington Stanley scoring 20 goals in 28 appearances with the U18s in the 2021–22 season, and signed his first professional contract with the club on 26 July 2022. He joined Northern Premier League Division One West club Witton Albion on a month-long loan on 6 September 2022, where he made six senior league and cup appearances. Returning to Accrington Stanley, he made his professional debut with them as a late substitute in a 3-0 EFL League One loss to Fleetwood Town on 29 October 2022. He scored a late goal in a 3–1 loss to Leeds United in the fourth round of the 2022-23 FA Cup. On 30 April 2024, it was announced Adekoya will be leaving the club at the end of his contract.

In October 2024, Adekoya joined Warrington Rylands. In January 2025, he joined his brother Dean at Runcorn Linnets.

== Career statistics ==
As of match played 28 January 2025

Appearances and goals by club, season and competition
Club	Season	League			FA Cup		EFL Cup		Other		Total	
Club	Season	Division	Apps	Goals	Apps	Goals	Apps	Goals	Apps	Goals	Apps	Goals
Accrington Stanley	2022–23	League One	7	0	2	1	0	0	1 (Note: Appearance(s) in EFL Trophy)	0	10	1
Accrington Stanley	2023–24	League Two	7	0	0	0	0	0	2	0	9	0
Accrington Stanley	Total		14	0	2	1	0	0	3	0	19	1
Witton Albion (loan)	2022–23	Northern Premier League; Division One West	4	0	0	0	—		2 (Note: One appearance in FA Trophy, one appearance in Mid Cheshire District FA Senior Cup)	0	6	0
Warrington Rylands	2024–25	Northern Premier League Premier Division	5	1	0	0	—		1 (Note: Appearance(s) in FA Trophy)	1	6	2
Runcorn Linnets	2024–25	Northern Premier League Premier Division	1	0	0	0	—		0	0	1	0
Career total			24	1	2	1	0	0	6	1	32	3

== Personal life ==
Born in Ireland to Nigerian parents, Adekoya moved to England at a young age. He is eligible to represent England, Nigeria and Ireland internationally.
