= Jack Manly =

English footballer (born 2004)

Personal information
- Date of birth: 19 October 2004 (age 22)
- Place of birth: Wandsworth, England
- Height: 5 ft 3 in (1.60 m)
- Position: Midfielder

Team information
- Current team: Leiston

Youth career
- –2020: Ipswich Town

Senior career*
| Years | Team | Apps | (Gls) |
| 2020–2024 | Ipswich Town | 0 | (0) |
| 2023–2024 | → Leiston (loan) | 35 | (3) |
| 2024– | Leiston | 15 | (0) |
| 2024 | → Maldon & Tiptree (loan) | 3 | (1) |
| 2024–2025 | → Ipswich Wanderers (loan) | | |
- * Club domestic league appearances and goals as of 15:59, 28 November 2024 (UTC)

Jack Manly (born 19 October 2004) is an English footballer who plays as a midfielder for Southern League Premier Division Central club Leiston.

== Career ==
He made his debut for Ipswich Town on 10 November 2020 as a substitute in a 2–0 EFL Trophy defeat to Crawley Town, and was Ipswich's second youngest player at the age of 16 years and 22 days.

In June 2024, Manly returned to Southern League Premier Division Central club Leiston on a permanent deal, having spent time on loan the previous season. In November 2024, he joined Maldon & Tiptree on a one-month loan deal. In December 2024, he joined Ipswich Wanderers on a similar deal.

== Career statistics ==
As of match played 10 November 2020

Appearances and goals by club, season and competition
| Club | Season | League | | | FA Cup | | EFL Cup | | Other | | Total | |
| Club | Season | Division | Apps | Goals | Apps | Goals | Apps | Goals | Apps | Goals | Apps | Goals |
|---|---|---|---|---|---|---|---|---|---|---|---|---|
| Ipswich Town | 2020–21 | League One | 0 | 0 | 0 | 0 | 0 | 0 | 1 (Note: Appearance(s) in EFL Trophy) | 0 | 1 | 0 |
| Career total | | | 0 | 0 | 0 | 0 | 0 | 0 | 1 | 0 | 1 | 0 |
