= Joel Anker =

English footballer (born 2004)

Personal information
- Full name: Joel Donald Unashe Anker
- Date of birth: 18 January 2005 (age 21)
- Height: 1.68 m (5 ft 6 in)
- Position: Midfielder

Team information
- Current team: Banbury United

Youth career
- Milton Keynes Dons

Senior career*
Years	Team	Apps	(Gls)
2022–2025	Milton Keynes Dons	0	(0)
2022–2023	→ Tring Athletic (loan)	4	(2)
2023	→ AFC Rushden & Diamonds (loan)	12	(4)
2023–2024	→ Biggleswade Town (loan)	6	(0)
2024	→ Hitchin Town (loan)	7	(0)
2025	→ AFC Dunstable (loan)	10	(1)
2025–	Banbury United	32	(3)
- * Club domestic league appearances and goals as of 20:00, 21 March 2026 (UTC)

Joel Anker (born 11 October 2004) is an English semi-professional footballer who plays as a midfielder for Southern League Premier Division Central club Banbury United.

He is a former graduate of the academy of EFL League One club Milton Keynes Dons.

== Career ==
=== Milton Keynes Dons ===
Anker joined the academy of Milton Keynes Dons at a young age, and progressed through the various age groups. In January 2023, he joined Southern League Premier Division Central club AFC Rushden & Diamonds on loan, before signing his first professional contract with Milton Keynes Dons in June 2023. He joined Biggleswade Town on loan in December 2023, before later joining Hitchin Town in March 2024 until the end of the season.

With continuing limited first team opportunities, Anker joined Southern League Division One Central club AFC Dunstable on a month-long youth loan in January 2025. At the end of the 2024–25 season, Anker was one of several players released by Milton Keynes Dons.

=== Banbury United ===
On 8 August 2025, Anker joined Southern League Premier Division Central club Banbury United.

== Career statistics ==
As of 21 March 2026

Appearances and goals by club, season and competition
Club	Season	League			FA Cup		EFL Cup		Other		Total	
Club	Season	Division	Apps	Goals	Apps	Goals	Apps	Goals	Apps	Goals	Apps	Goals
Milton Keynes Dons	2023–24	League Two	0	0	0	0	0	0	3 (Note: Appearance(s) in the EFL Trophy)	0	3	0
Milton Keynes Dons	2024–25	League Two	0	0	0	0	0	0	0	0	0	0
Milton Keynes Dons	Total		0	0	0	0	0	0	3	0	3	0
Tring Athletic (loan)	2022–23	Spartan South Midlands Premier	4	2	0	0	—		—		4	2
AFC Rushden & Diamonds (loan)	2022–23	Southern Premier Central	12	4	0	0	—		—		12	4
Biggleswade Town (loan)	2023–24	Southern Premier Central	6	0	0	0	—		—		6	0
Hitchin Town (loan)	2023–24	Southern Premier Central	7	0	0	0	—		—		7	0
AFC Dunstable (loan)	2024–25	Southern Division One Central	10	1	—		—		1 (Note: Appearance in Bedfordshire Senior Cup)	0	11	1
Banbury United	2025–26	Southern Premier Central	32	3	4	0	—		2 (Note: Appearance(s) in the FA Trophy)	1	38	4
Career total			61	9	4	0	0	0	5	1	70	10

== Honours ==
AFC Dunstable

- Bedfordshire Senior Cup: 2024–25
