= Maxi Oyedele =

Polish footballer (born 2004)

Personal information
- Full name: Maximillian Rotimi Oyedele
- Date of birth: 7 November 2004 (age 22)
- Place of birth: Salford, England
- Height: 1.83 m (6 ft 0 in)
- Position: Midfielder

Team information
- Current team: Strasbourg
- Number: 8

Youth career
- –2011: Beechfield United
- 2011–2012: Burnley
- 2012–2022: Manchester United

Senior career*
Years	Team	Apps	(Gls)
2022–2024	Manchester United	0	(0)
2023	→ Altrincham (loan)	12	(4)
2024	→ Forest Green Rovers (loan)	4	(0)
2024–2025	Legia Warsaw	16	(0)
2025–	Strasbourg	8	(1)

International career^{‡}
2022	Poland U18	1	(0)
2022–2023	Poland U19	9	(0)
2024	Poland U20	1	(0)
2023–	Poland U21	6	(0)
2024	Poland	2	(0)
- * Club domestic league appearances and goals as of 19:18, 10 May 2026 (UTC) ‡ National team caps and goals as of 21:26, 19 November 2026 (UTC)

Maximillian Rotimi Oyedele (born 7 November 2004) is a professional footballer who plays as a midfielder for Ligue 1 club Strasbourg. Born in England, he represents the Poland national team.

== Club career ==
Oyedele joined the Manchester United Academy aged eight from Burnley, impressing through the youth ranks. Having progressed through the ranks, he was a part of the 2021–22 FA Youth Cup winning side, featuring from the bench in the final.

In February 2023, Oyedele, alongside teammates Joe Hugill and Sonny Aljofree, joined National League club Altrincham on loan as part of a new scheme that would see him continue training with the Manchester United youth teams, as well as having the opportunity to gain first-team playing experience. The move proved successful with Oyedele being nominated for the Altrincham Goal of the Season for his strike against Oldham Athletic. Following his return from loan to Manchester United, he was blocked from competing in the Under-19 European Championship, instead being included in the first-team squad for the trip to Norway.

In January 2024, Oyedele joined League Two bottom club Forest Green Rovers on loan until the end of the season.

On 22 August 2024, Oyedele joined Ekstraklasa club Legia Warsaw on a permanent transfer.

On 16 July 2025, French club Strasbourg announced the signing of Oyedele on a five-year contract after activating his €6 million buyout clause, with Manchester United receiving 40% of the fee.

== International career ==
Born in Salford, Greater Manchester, England, to a Polish mother and a Nigerian-French father, he is a Poland youth international, having represented Poland at the under-18, under-19, under-20 and under-21 levels. He holds Nigerian, French and Polish nationalities from his parents.

On 30 September 2024, having played 100 minutes across two matches for Legia, Oyedele received a surprise call-up to the senior team by manager Michał Probierz for the UEFA Nations League matches against Portugal and Croatia. He made his first appearance and start for Poland against Portugal on 12 October, before being replaced by Jakub Moder after 66 minutes of a 3–1 loss.

== Career statistics ==
=== Club ===
As of match played 10 May 2026

Appearances and goals by club, season and competition
Club	Season	League			National cup (Note: Includes Polish Cup, Coupe de France)		League cup		Europe		Other		Total	
Club	Season	Division	Apps	Goals	Apps	Goals	Apps	Goals	Apps	Goals	Apps	Goals	Apps	Goals
Manchester United U21	2022–23	—	—		—		—		—		2 (Note: Appearances in EFL Trophy)	0	2	0
Manchester United U21	2023–24	—	—		—		—		—		2	0	2	0
Altrincham (loan)	2022–23	National League	12	4	—		—		—		—		12	4
Forest Green Rovers (loan)	2023–24	EFL League Two	4	0	—		—		—		—		4	0
Legia Warsaw	2024–25	Ekstraklasa	16	0	3	0	—		5 (Note: Appearances in UEFA Conference League)	0	—		24	0
Strasbourg	2025–26	Ligue 1	8	1	1	0	—		5	0	—		13	1
Strasbourg	2026–27	Ligue 1	0	0	0	0	—		—		—		0	0
Strasbourg	Total		8	1	1	0	—		5	0	—		13	1
Career total			40	5	4	0	0	0	10	0	4	0	58	5

=== International ===
As of match played 15 October 2024

Appearances and goals by national team and year
National team	Year	Apps	Goals
Poland
Poland	2024	2	0
Total		2	0

== Honours ==
Manchester United U18

- FA Youth Cup: 2021–22

Legia Warsaw

- Polish Cup: 2024–25
