= Will Squires =

English footballer (born 2004)

Personal information
- Full name: William Joseph Squires
- Date of birth: 29 April 2004 (age 22)
- Position: Defender

Team information
- Current team: Bamber Bridge

Youth career
- 2013–2022: Blackpool

Senior career*
Years	Team	Apps	(Gls)
2022–2024	Blackpool	0	(0)
2023	→ Bamber Bridge (loan)	8	(0)
2023–2024	→ Southport (loan)	3	(0)
2024–	Bamber Bridge	0	(0)
- * Club domestic league appearances and goals as of 13:56, 30 July 2024 (UTC)

William Joseph Squires (born 29 April 2004) is an English professional footballer who plays as a defender for Northern Premier League Premier Division club Bamber Bridge.

== Career ==
Squires signed his first professional contract with Blackpool in May 2022, a one-year deal with the option for a further 12 months; Academy director Ciaran Donnelly said that Squires "has an ultra-professional approach to everything he does". A youth-team player with Blackpool from the age of nine, he had been a part of the under-19 team that reached quarter-finals of the FA Youth Cup and won the Lancashire FA Professional Youth Cup, making 44 appearances in the 2021–22 campaign. He was loaned out to Bamber Bridge in the Northern Premier League Premier Division, before being recalled on 7 October 2023. He made his first-team debut for Blackpool at Bloomfield Road on 10 October 2023, in a 5–2 win over Liverpool U21 in the group stage of the EFL Trophy. On 15 December 2023, he joined National League North club Southport on a one-month loan.

In July 2024, Squires returned to Bamber Bridge on a permanent basis following his release from Blackpool. Squires now plays for non league Squires Gate FC based in Blackpool.

== Career statistics ==
As of match played 26 December 2023

Appearances and goals by club, season and competition
Club	Season	League			FA Cup		EFL Cup		Other		Total	
Club	Season	Division	Apps	Goals	Apps	Goals	Apps	Goals	Apps	Goals	Apps	Goals
Blackpool	2022–23	EFL League One	0	0	0	0	0	0	0	0	0	0
Blackpool	2023–24	EFL League One	0	0	0	0	0	0	2 (Note: Appearance(s) in EFL Trophy)	0	2	0
Blackpool	Total		0	0	0	0	0	0	2	0	2	0
Bamber Bridge (loan)	2023–24	Northern Premier League; Premier Division	8	0	0	0	0	0	0	0	8	0
Southport (loan)	2023–24	National League North	3	0	0	0	0	0	0	0	3	0
Career total			11	0	0	0	0	0	2	0	13	0
