= Sam Mather =

English professional footballer (born 2004)

Personal information
- Full name: Samuel James Mather
- Date of birth: 3 September 2004 (age 22)
- Place of birth: Salford, England
- Height: 1.80 m (5 ft 11 in)
- Position: Winger

Youth career
- 2010–2023: Manchester United

Senior career*
Years	Team	Apps	(Gls)
2023–2026	Manchester United	0	(0)
2023–2024	→ Rochdale (loan)	10	(2)
2025	→ Tranmere Rovers (loan)	2	(0)
2026	Kayserispor	3	(0)

International career
2019	England U16	2	(0)
2021–2022	England U18	8	(0)
2022	England U19	1	(0)
- * Club domestic league appearances and goals as of 29 August 2026

Samuel James Mather (born 3 September 2004) is an English professional footballer who plays as a winger.

== Club career ==
=== Manchester United ===
Born in Salford, he is a winger who can operate on either flank, as well as in attacking midfield. A product of the Manchester United academy, he won the FA Youth Cup with the club. He signed his first professional contract with the club in September 2021.

His progress was hampered by injuries, but he spent time in the 2023–24 season on loan at Rochdale where he made ten appearances and scored two goals. He signed a new multi-year contract with Manchester United in the summer of 2024 and travelled with the first-team on their pre-season tour to the United States. In February 2025, he joined EFL League Two side Tranmere Rovers on loan for the rest of the season.

=== Kayserispor ===
On 17 January 2026, Mather joined Süper Lig side Kayserispor on a permanent deal.

== International career ==
He was an England youth international.

== Honours ==
Manchester United U18

- FA Youth Cup: 2021–22
