= Maliq Cadogan =

Guyanese footballer (born 2004)

Personal information
- Full name: Maliq Anthony Cadogan
- Date of birth: 25 February 2004 (age 22)
- Place of birth: Lambeth, England
- Position: Winger

Team information
- Current team: Peterborough Sports
- Number: 30

Youth career
- 2017–2023: Crystal Palace
- 2023–2024: Swansea City

Senior career*
| Years | Team | Apps | (Gls) |
| 2024–2025 | Swansea City | 0 | (0) |
| 2024 | → Kidderminster Harriers (loan) | 12 | (0) |
| 2025– | Peterborough Sports | 4 | (1) |

International career^{‡}
| 2024– | Guyana | 3 | (0) |
- * Club domestic league appearances and goals as of 12:06, 22 November 2025 (UTC) ‡ National team caps and goals as of 01:19, 27 March 2025 (UTC)

Maliq Anthony Cadogan (born 25 February 2004) is a professional football player who plays as a winger for Southern League Premier Division Central club Peterborough Sports. Born in England, he plays for the Guyana national team.

== Career ==
A youth product of Crystal Palace, Cadogan signed a scholar contract with them on 7 July 2020. He signed a professional contract with them on 9 July 2022. He joined the youth academy of Swansea City on 14 July 2023 on a contract until 2025 and was assigned to their U21s. On 3 July 2024, he joined Kidderminster Harriers in the National League North for half a season. Cadogan left Swansea by mutual consent at the end of the 2024–25 season.

In September 2025, Cadogan joined National League North club Peterborough Sports.

== International career ==
Cadogan was born in England and is of Guyanese descent. He was called up to the Guyana national team for CONCACAF Nations League matches in November 2024.
