= Leojo Davidson =

English footballer (born 2003)

Personal information
- Full name: Leojo Chase Michael Davidson
- Date of birth: 18 December 2003 (age 22)
- Place of birth: Sheffield, England
- Height: 6 ft 0 in (1.83 m)
- Positions: Right-back; right winger

Team information
- Current team: Ossett United

Youth career
- Manchester City
- Sheffield Wednesday

Senior career*
Years	Team	Apps	(Gls)
2021–2023	Sheffield Wednesday	0	(0)
2023	Basford United	0	(0)
2023–2024	Sheffield	2	(0)
2024	Hallam		
2024	Mickleover	4	(1)
2024–	Ossett United	1	(0)
- * Club domestic league appearances and goals as of 11:36, 11 October 2024 (UTC)

Leojo Davidson (born 18 December 2003) is an English professional footballer who plays for Northern Premier League Division One East club Ossett United.

== Career ==
On 12 August 2020, Davidson became a first year scholar at Sheffield Wednesday. He signed professional terms with the club on 1 July 2021. He made his professional debut in the EFL Trophy against Bradford City on 30 August 2022. Davidson was not part of the Sheffield Wednesday Under-21s retained list, as announced on 3 May 2023.

On 22 June 2023, Davidson joined Basford United.

On 26 February, Davidson joined Hallam. In July 2024, he joined Northern Premier League Premier Division side Mickleover.

== Career statistics ==
As of match played 14 September 2024

Appearances and goals by club, season and competition
Club	Season	League			FA Cup		League Cup		Other		Total	
Club	Season	Division	Apps	Goals	Apps	Goals	Apps	Goals	Apps	Goals	Apps	Goals
Sheffield Wednesday	2022–23	League One	0	0	0	0	0	0	2 (Note: Appearance(s) in EFL Trophy)	0	2	0
Basford United	2023–24	Northern Premier League	0	0	0	0	0	0	0	0	0	0
Sheffield	2023–24	NPL Division One East	2	0	0	0	0	0	0	0	2	0
Hallam	2023–24	NC East Premier	2	0	0	0	0	0	0	0	2	0
Mickleover	2024–25	NPL Premier Division	4	1	1	0	—		0	0	5	1
Career total			8	1	1	0	0	0	2	0	11	1
