= Dannen Francis =

Antiguan football player (born 2004)

Personal information
- Full name: Dannen Letaj Francis
- Date of birth: 14 December 2004 (age 21)
- Place of birth: Leicester, England
- Height: 1.76 m (5 ft 9 in)
- Position: Winger

Team information
- Current team: Fleetwood Town
- Number: 35

Youth career
- Derby County
- Nottingham Forest
- 2021–2023: Blackpool

Senior career*
Years	Team	Apps	(Gls)
2023–2024	Blackpool	0	(0)
2023	→ Workington (loan)	10	(2)
2024–	Fleetwood Town	0	(0)

International career^{‡}
2024–	Antigua and Barbuda	2	(0)
- * Club domestic league appearances and goals as of 18:55, 17 June 2025 (UTC) ‡ National team caps and goals as of 18:55, 17 June 2025 (UTC)

Dannen Letaj Francis (born 14 December 2004) is a professional football player who plays as winger for Fleetwood Town. Born in England, he plays for the Antigua and Barbuda national team.

== Career ==
Francis is a former youth product of the academies of Derby County, Nottingham Forest and Blackpool. On 11 May 2023, he signed his first professional contract with Blackpool after a 2-year trial. On 9 November 2023, he joined Workington on a short-term loan. On 22 July 2024, he signed with the development side of Fleetwood Town.

== International career ==
Born in England, Francis is of Antiguan descent. He was called up to the Antigua and Barbuda national team for a set of 2024–25 CONCACAF Nations League matches.
