= Joe Hugill =

English footballer (born 2003)

Personal information
- Full name: Joseph Brennen Hugill
- Date of birth: 19 October 2003 (age 23)
- Place of birth: Durham, England
- Height: 1.88 m (6 ft 2 in)
- Position: Centre-forward

Team information
- Current team: Kilmarnock
- Number: 9

Youth career
- Newcastle United
- Sunderland
- 2020–2026: Manchester United

Senior career*
Years	Team	Apps	(Gls)
2023–2026	Manchester United	0	(0)
2023	→ Altrincham (loan)	8	(1)
2024	→ Burton Albion (loan)	18	(1)
2024–2025	→ Wigan Athletic (loan)	13	(3)
2025	→ Carlisle United (loan)	17	(2)
2025–2026	→ Barnet (loan)	5	(0)
2026–	Kilmarnock	15	(8)
- * Club domestic league appearances and goals as of 20 May 2026

Joseph Brennen Hugill (born 19 October 2003) is an English footballer who plays as a centre-forward for Scottish Premiership club Kilmarnock.

== Early life ==
Born in Durham, England, Hugill started his career with Newcastle United, where he spent a year, before joining rivals Sunderland.

== Club career ==
=== Manchester United ===
Hugill signed with Premier League side Manchester United on 1 July 2020, with the Manchester club reportedly having fought off competition from Arsenal and Tottenham Hotspur, among others, for his signature. His career in Manchester started brightly, with his most notable performance coming against Liverpool U23, where he scored four goals in a 6–3 win. In doing so, he became only the second player in Manchester United history to score four in one game against Liverpool, after Steve Jones in a reserve game in 1977.

Hugill was called up to train with the Manchester United first team for 2021–22 pre-season preparation. He featured in friendly games against Derby County and Queens Park Rangers.

He signed a new contract in July 2021.

On 1 February 2023, Hugill was one of three Manchester United youngsters to join National League club Altrincham on loan for the remainder of the season, alongside Sonny Aljofree and Maxi Oyedele. This marked the start of a new scheme that would see the youngsters continue to train and play for Manchester United's academy teams, while also earning senior experience playing for their loan club.

On 12 January 2024, he joined League One club Burton Albion on loan until the end of the season. He made his debut three days later, scoring his side's equaliser within minutes of his introduction from the bench in an eventual 3–2 defeat to Derby County.

He joined League One club Wigan Athletic on loan at the start of the 2024–25 season, returning to Manchester United on 8 January 2025.

On 17 January 2025, Hugill joined League Two bottom side Carlisle United on loan for the remainder of the season.

On 19 July 2025, Hugill joined Barnet on a season-long loan. He was recalled by Manchester United on 14 January 2026.

=== Kilmarnock ===
On 30 January 2026, Hugill joined Kilmarnock on a permanent deal after 6 years at Manchester United, signing an eighteen-month contract with the Scottish Premiership club.

== International career ==
Hugill was called up to the England national under-18 football team in 2020.

== Career statistics ==
As of match played 1 January 2026

Appearances and goals by club, season and competition
Club	Season	League			FA Cup		EFL Cup		Europe		Other		Total	
Club	Season	Division	Apps	Goals	Apps	Goals	Apps	Goals	Apps	Goals	Apps	Goals	Apps	Goals
Manchester United U21	2020–21	—	—		—		—		—		3 (Note: Appearance(s) in the EFL Trophy)	0	3	0
Manchester United U21	2021–22	—	—		—		—		—		1	1	1	1
Manchester United U21	2022–23	—	—		—		—		—		2	0	2	0
Manchester United U21	2023–24	—	—		—		—		—		3	1	3	1
Manchester United U21	2024–25	—	—		—		—		—		0	0	0	0
Manchester United U21	Total		0	0	0	0	0	0	0	0	9	2	9	2
Altrincham (loan)	2022–23	National League	8	1	0	0	—		—		2 (Note: Appearance(s) in FA Trophy)	0	10	1
Burton Albion (loan)	2023–24	League One	18	1	0	0	0	0	—		0	0	18	1
Wigan Athletic (loan)	2024–25	League One	13	3	1	0	1	0	—		3	2	18	5
Carlisle United (loan)	2024–25	League Two	17	2	—		—		—		—		17	2
Barnet (loan)	2025–26	League Two	5	0	0	0	1	0	—		0	0	6	0
Career total			61	7	1	0	2	0	0	0	14	4	78	11

== Honours ==
Manchester United U18

- FA Youth Cup: 2021–22
