= Jack Moore-Billam =

English footballer (born 2004)

Personal information
- Full name: Jack Billy James Moore-Billam
- Date of birth: 5 March 2004 (age 22)
- Place of birth: Sheffield, England
- Height: 5 ft 9 in (1.75 m)
- Position: Midfielder

Team information
- Current team: Gainsborough Trinity

Youth career
- 2020–2022: Scunthorpe United

Senior career*
Years	Team	Apps	(Gls)
2021–2023	Scunthorpe United	6	(0)
2022–2023	→ Cleethorpes Town (loan)	23	(1)
2023–	Gainsborough Trinity	0	(0)
- * Club domestic league appearances and goals as of 16:52, 6 May 2023 (UTC)

Jack Billy James Moore-Billam (born 5 March 2004) is an English professional footballer who plays as a midfielder.

== Playing career ==
=== Scunthorpe United ===
Born in Sheffield, Moore-Billam made his senior debut for Scunthorpe United in the EFL Trophy coming on as a substitute in a 3–0 defeat to Manchester City U23s on 24 August 2021. In EFL League Two, he made his first professional start on 18 April 2022 in a 1–1 draw against Stevenage. Alongside fellow youth team graduate Ethan Young, Moore-Billam signed his first professional contract with Scunthorpe on 22 April 2022.

On 11 August 2022, Moore-Billam joined Northern Premier League Division One East club Cleethorpes Town on a one-month loan deal. He scored in his second appearance in a 4–2 victory over Tadcaster Albion. Moore-Billam returned to the club for a further one-month loan deal in October 2022. The loan deal was later extended. This was extended until the end of the season in March 2023. Following Scunthorpe's relegation to the National League North, he was released at the end of the 2022–23 season.

=== Gainsborough Trinity ===
On 26 June 2023, Moore-Billam signed for Gainsborough Trinity.

== Career statistics ==
As of end of 2022–23 season

Appearances and goals by club, season and competition
Club	Season	League			FA Cup		League Cup		Other		Total	
Club	Season	Division	Apps	Goals	Apps	Goals	Apps	Goals	Apps	Goals	Apps	Goals
Scunthorpe United	2021–22	League Two	6	0	0	0	0	0	1 (Note: Appearances in EFL Trophy)	0	7	0
Scunthorpe United	Total		6	0	0	0	0	0	1	0	7	0
Cleethorpes Town (loan)	2022–23	NPL Division One East	23	1	0	0	—		0	0	23	1
Career total			29	1	0	0	0	0	1	0	30	1
