= Josh Seary =

English footballer (born 2004)

Personal information
- Full name: Joshua David Seary
- Date of birth: 10 September 2004 (age 22)
- Place of birth: Liverpool, England
- Position: Defender

Team information
- Current team: Radcliffe

Youth career
- Preston North End

Senior career*
Years	Team	Apps	(Gls)
2022–2026	Preston North End	6	(0)
2022–2023	→ Warrington Town (loan)	31	(0)
2024–2025	→ Larne (loan)	12	(0)
2026–	Radcliffe	13	(0)
- * Club domestic league appearances and goals as of 20:45, 4 April 2026 (UTC)

Joshua David Seary (born 10 September 2004) is an English footballer who plays as a defender for National League North club Radcliffe.

== Career ==
Born in Liverpool, Seary joined Preston North End at youth level, signing professional terms aged just sixteen. In August 2022, he got a first experience of senior football when he joined Northern Premier League Premier Division club Warrington Town on a three-month loan deal, later extended until January 2023.

On 8 August 2023, Seary made his first-team debut for Preston North End, starting in an EFL Trophy First Round penalty shoot-out defeat to Salford City. Following the match, manager Ryan Lowe confirmed that plans were to send the player on loan to a League Two club. Two weeks on from having signed a new eighteen-month contract, he made his league debut on 23 February 2024, substituted on in added time at the end of a 3–0 victory over Coventry City.

On 27 August 2024, Seary joined NIFL Premiership club Larne on loan until 12 January 2025.

== International career ==
In January 2023, Seary was called up to a training camp with the Republic of Ireland U19 squad.

== Career statistics ==
As of end of 2023–24 season

Appearances and goals by club, season and competition
Club	Season	League			FA Cup		League Cup		Other		Total	
Club	Season	Division	Apps	Goals	Apps	Goals	Apps	Goals	Apps	Goals	Apps	Goals
Preston North End	2022–23	Championship	0	0	0	0	0	0	0	0	0	0
Preston North End	2023–24	Championship	4	0	0	0	1	0	0	0	5	0
Preston North End	Total		4	0	0	0	1	0	0	0	5	0
Warrington Town (loan)	2022–23	NPL Premier Division	19	0	3	0	—		4 (Note: Three appearances in FA Trophy, one appearance in Cheshire Senior Cup)	0	26	0
Career total			23	0	3	0	1	0	4	0	31	0
