= ASEAN All-Stars =

Southeast Asian football team

- Association: ASEAN Football Federation
First colours

First international
- Indonesia 1–0 ASEAN All-Stars (Jakarta, Indonesia; 11 May 2014)

Biggest win
- ASEAN All-Stars 1–0 Manchester United (England) (Kuala Lumpur, Malaysia; 28 May 2025)

Biggest defeat
- Indonesia 1–0 ASEAN All-Stars (Jakarta, Indonesia; 11 May 2014)

The ASEAN All-Stars is a football team founded by the ASEAN Football Federation in 2014. The team is made up of Southeast Asia internationals and selected players from the regional leagues.

== History ==
=== 2014 team ===
The ASEAN Football Federation (AFF) announced in April 2014 that a friendly will be held involving the Indonesian national team and an ASEAN All-Stars team. It was meant as a charity event in aid of victims of Typhoon Haiyan which affected the Philippines in 2013. Victims of the eruption of Mount Kelud and Mount Sinabung in Indonesia were also reportedly beneficiaries as well.

The ASEAN team was coached by Malaysian coach K. Rajagopal. Thai coach Piyapong Pue-on was supposed to lead the team but was replaced by Rajagopal. Radojko Avramović, Winfried Schäfer, and Michael Weiß were also ASEAN head coach candidates. Alfred Riedl was Indonesia's coach. The charity match was held at the Gelora Bung Karno Stadium on 11 May 2014.

=== 2025 team ===
English Premier League club Manchester United lost 0–1 against ASEAN All-Stars team on 28 May 2025 at the Bukit Jalil National Stadium in front of a crowd of 72,550. Myanmar player Maung Maung Lwin scored the sole goal of the match in the 71st minute.

The friendly was billed as the Maybank Challenge Cup and the proceeds was pledged to go to the charity organisation, Al-Sultan Abdullah Foundation (YASA). The match was organised by ProEvents International. South Korean Kim Sang-sik was the team's head coach, while their captain was Ezequiel Agüero of Malaysia.

== Fixtures ==
=== 2014 ===
11 May 2014
21:00 UTC+8

Indonesia	1–0	ASEAN All-Stars
Safiq 14' (o.g.)	Report

Gelora Bung Karno Stadium, Jakarta, Indonesia
Referee: Ahmed Afsah (Maldives)

GK	22	(Indonesia) Dian Agus	(substituted off) 46'
RB	18	(Indonesia) Manahati Lestusen	(substituted off) 68'
CB	13	(Indonesia) Achmad Jufriyanto	(substituted off) 46'
CB	16	(Indonesia) Muhammad Roby	(substituted off) 46'
LB	21	(Indonesia) Supardi	(substituted off) 46'
DM	14	(Indonesia) Hariono	(substituted off) 46'
RM	20	(Indonesia) Steven Imbiri
LM	11	(Indonesia) Rizky Pora	(substituted off) 85'
AM	15	(Indonesia) Firman Utina (c)	(substituted off) 46'
CF	19	(Indonesia) Talaohu Musafri	(substituted off) 68'
CF	7	(Indonesia) Zulham Zamrun
Substitutes:
GK	12	(Indonesia) I Made Wirawan	(substituted on) 46'	(substituted off) 69'
GK	1	(Indonesia) Choirul Huda	(substituted on) 69'
DF	6	(Indonesia) Fachruddin Aryanto	(substituted on) 46'
DF	4	(Indonesia) Ricardo Salampessy	(substituted on) 46'
DF	3	(Indonesia) Zulkifli Syukur	(substituted on) 46'
DF	2	(Indonesia) Novan Sasongko	(substituted on) 85'
MF	10	(Indonesia) Raphael Maitimo	(substituted on) 46'
MF	5	(Indonesia) Asri Akbar	(substituted on) 46'
MF	8	(Indonesia) Imanuel Padwa	(substituted on) 68'
FW	9	(Indonesia) Ferdinand Sinaga	(substituted on) 68'
Manager:
(Austria) Alfred Riedl

GK	1	(Singapore) Hassan Sunny	(substituted off) 85'
RB	6	(Malaysia) Mahali Jasuli
CB	5	(Malaysia) Aidil Zafuan
CB	12	(Vietnam) Trương Đình Luật
LB	15	(Myanmar) Thein Than Win	(substituted off) 58'
CM	14	(Singapore) Hariss Harun
CM	20	(Malaysia) Safiq Rahim
RW	11	(Vietnam) Nguyễn Văn Quyết
AM	9	(Singapore) Shahril Ishak (c)	(substituted off) 37'
LW	22	(Philippines) Chieffy Caligdong	(substituted off) 37'
CF	10	(Vietnam) Lê Công Vinh
Substitutes:
GK	17	(Brunei) Fakhrul Zulhazmi	(substituted on) 85'
GK	19	(Malaysia) Sharbinee Allawee
DF	2	(Cambodia) Hong Pheng	(substituted on) 37'
DF	3	(Philippines) Aly Borromeo
DF	4	(Brunei) Azri Zahari	(substituted on) 58'
MF	16	(Thailand) Datsakorn Thonglao
MF	7	(Malaysia) Amirul Hadi
MF	8	(Singapore) Isa Halim
FW	18	(Myanmar) Soe Min Oo	(substituted on) 37'
FW	21	(Thailand) Wuttichai Tathong
Manager:
(Malaysia) K. Rajagopal

=== 2025 ===
28 May 2025
20:45 UTC+8

ASEAN All-Stars	1–0	(England) Manchester United
Maung Maung Lwin 71'	Report (MU1), (MU2); SCW (UK)

Bukit Jalil National Stadium, Kuala Lumpur, Malaysia
Attendance: 72,550
Referee: Nazmi Nasaruddin (Malaysia)

GK	1	(Thailand) Patiwat Khammai	(substituted off) 82'
CB	12	(Philippines) Amani Aguinaldo	(substituted off) 46'
CB	4	(Cambodia) Kan Mo	(substituted off) 64'
CB	24	(Australia) Harrison Delbridge
RM	18	(Australia) Kealey Adamson	(substituted off) 39'
CM	9	(Vietnam) Nguyễn Hai Long	(substituted off) 46'
LM	15	(Malaysia) Declan Lambert	(substituted off) 46'
AM	6	(Philippines) Sandro Reyes	(substituted off) 46'
AM	8	(Malaysia) Ezequiel Agüero (c)	(substituted off) 54'
SS	19	(Australia) Yaya Dukuly	(substituted off) 46'
CF	20	(Cambodia) Abdel Kader Coulibaly	(substituted off) 39'
Substitutes:
DF	46	(Malaysia) Adib Ra'op	(substituted on) 39'	(substituted off) 64'
FW	17	(Laos) Bounphachan Bounkong	(substituted on) 39'	(substituted off) 54'
FW	7	(Timor-Leste) João Pedro	(substituted on) 46'	(substituted off) 82'
DF	71	(Singapore) Irfan Fandi	(substituted on) 46'	(substituted off) 68'
DF	23	(Malaysia) Azam Azmi	(substituted on) 46'	(substituted off) 82'
FW	21	(Australia) Adrian Segecic	(substituted on) 46'
MF	14	(Vietnam) Nguyễn Hoàng Đức	(substituted on) 46'
MF	10	(Thailand) Ben Davis	(substituted on) 54'
FW	11	(Myanmar) Maung Maung Lwin	(substituted on) 54'
DF	2	(Vietnam) Đỗ Duy Mạnh	(substituted on) 64'
DF	5	(Vietnam) Nguyễn Văn Vĩ	(substituted on) 64'
DF	16	(Indonesia) Kakang Rudianto	(substituted on) 68'
FW	77	(Indonesia) Malik Risaldi	(substituted on) 82'
GK	29	(Malaysia) Haziq Nadzli	(substituted on) 82'
MF	22	(Thailand) Worachit Kanitsribampen	(substituted on) 82'
Manager:
(South Korea) Kim Sang-sik

GK	24	(Cameroon) André Onana		(substituted off) 46'
CB	79	(England) Reece Munro		(substituted off) 46'
CB	26	(England) Ayden Heaven		(substituted off) 46'
CB	5	(England) Harry Maguire (c)		(substituted off) 32'
DM	18	(Brazil) Casemiro		(substituted off) 32'
DM	25	(Uruguay) Manuel Ugarte		(substituted off) 46'
RM	20	(Portugal) Diogo Dalot		(substituted off) 32'
CM	37	(England) Kobbie Mainoo		(substituted off) 46'
CM	64	(Republic of Ireland) Jack Moorhouse		(substituted off) 32'
LM	13	(Denmark) Patrick Dorgu		(substituted off) 46'
CF	9	(Denmark) Rasmus Højlund		(substituted off) 46'
Substitutes:
DF	90	(Scotland) Daniel Armer		(substituted on) 32'	(substituted off) 46'
DF	80	(England) Jaydan Kamason		(substituted on) 32'	(substituted off) 46'
FW	72	(England) Shea Lacey		(substituted on) 32'	(substituted off) 46'
MF	42	(Mali) Sékou Koné		(substituted on) 32'	(substituted off) 46'
FW	17	(Argentina) Alejandro Garnacho		(substituted on) 46'
DF	41	(England) Harry Amass		(substituted on) 46'
DF	55	(England) Tyler Fredricson		(substituted on) 46'
MF	8	(Portugal) Bruno Fernandes		(substituted on) 46'
FW	56	(Denmark) Chido Obi		(substituted on) 46'
FW	16	(Ivory Coast) Amad Diallo		(substituted on) 46'
DF	87	(England) Godwill Kukonki	(yellow card) 90+1'	(substituted on) 46'
MF	43	(England) Toby Collyer		(substituted on) 46'
MF	58	(Scotland) Tyler Fletcher		(substituted on) 46'	(substituted off) 67'
DF	35	(Northern Ireland) Jonny Evans		(substituted on) 46'
GK	22	(England) Tom Heaton		(substituted on) 46'
MF	92	(England) Jim Thwaites		(substituted on) 67'
Manager:
(Portugal) Rúben Amorim

== Squad history ==
=== By match ===
Date	Head coach	Goalkeepers	Defenders	Midfielders	Forwards	Opponent	Ref.
11 May 2014	(Malaysia) K. Rajagopal	(Brunei) Fakhrul Zulhazmi; (Singapore) Hassan Sunny; (Malaysia) Sharbinee Allawee	(Brunei) Azri Zahari; (Cambodia) Hong Pheng; (Philippines) Aly Borromeo; (Malaysia) Aidil Zafuan; (Malaysia) Mahali Jasuli; (Brunei) Azri Zahari; (Myanmar) Thein Than Win; (Vietnam) Trương Đình Luật	(Malaysia) Safiq Rahim; (Malaysia) Amirul Hadi; (Singapore) Hariss Harun; (Singapore) Shahril Ishak; (Singapore) Isa Halim; (Thailand) Datsakorn Thonglao	(Myanmar) Soe Min Oo; (Philippines) Chieffy Caligdong; (Thailand) Wuttichai Tathong; (Vietnam) Lê Công Vinh; (Vietnam) Nguyễn Văn Quyết	Indonesia	
28 May 2025	(South Korea) Kim Sang-sik	(Malaysia) Haziq Nadzli; (Thailand) Patiwat Khammai	(Australia) Kealey Adamson; (Australia) Harrison Delbridge; (Cambodia) Kan Mo; (Indonesia) Kakang Rudianto; (Malaysia) Declan Lambert; (Malaysia) Adib Ra'op; (Malaysia) Azam Azmi; (Philippines) Amani Aguinaldo; (Singapore) Irfan Fandi; (Vietnam) Đỗ Duy Mạnh; (Vietnam) Nguyễn Văn Vĩ	(Malaysia) Sergio Agüero; (Philippines) Sandro Reyes; (Thailand) Ben Davis; (Thailand) Worachit Kanitsribampen; (Vietnam) Nguyễn Hai Long; (Vietnam) Nguyễn Hoàng Đức	(Australia) Yaya Dukuly; (Australia) Adrian Segecic; (Cambodia) Abdel Kader Coulibaly; (Indonesia) Malik Risaldi; (Laos) Bounphachan Bounkong; (Myanmar) Maung Maung Lwin; (Timor-Leste) João Pedro	(England) Manchester United	

=== By player nationality ===
Member association	2014	2025	Total
Malaysia	3	5	8
Vietnam	3	4	7
Thailand	2	3	5
Australia	0	4	4
Singapore	3	1	4
Cambodia	1	2	3
Myanmar	2	1	3
Philippines	1	2	3
Brunei	2	0	2
Indonesia	0	2	2
Laos	0	1	1
Timor-Leste	0	1	1

Team captain
Captain	Year	Opponent
(Singapore) Shahril Ishak	2014	Indonesia
(Malaysia) Ezequiel Agüero	2025	(England) Manchester United

== Honours ==
- Maybank Challenge Cup
  - Winners (1): 2025

== See also ==
- Malaysia League XI
- Indonesia XI
- Singapore Selection XI
