= Maybank Challenge Cup =

Piala Cabaran Maybank
ASEAN All-Stars	Manchester United
	(England)
1	0
- Date: 28 May 2025
- Venue: Bukit Jalil National Stadium, Kuala Lumpur
- Referee: Nazmi Nasaruddin (Malaysia)
- Attendance: 72,550
- Weather: Cloudy; 31 °C (88 °F); 66% humidity

The 2025 Maybank Challenge Cup (Malay: Piala Cabaran Maybank) was the charity hybrid friendly match played by the ASEAN All-Stars, a selection team by the ASEAN Football Federation and English Premier League club Manchester United in Kuala Lumpur, Malaysia.

The ASEAN All-Stars won the match 1–0, with Maung Maung Lwin scoring the solitary goal.

== Background ==
=== Organisation ===
Manchester United on 8 April 2025 announced that the club would be having an Asian tour following the conclusion of the 2024–25 Premier League season. The ASEAN All-Stars was announced as their opposition for a friendly match on 28 May, 2025 in Kuala Lumpur.

The scheduled friendly was billed as the Maybank Challenge Cup and was organised by a collaboration by ProEvents, the Football Association of Malaysia, and the title sponsor Maybank.

The proceeds of the event will reportedly go to the charity organisation Al-Sultan Abdullah Foundation (YASA).

=== Participating teams ===
==== ASEAN All-Stars ====
The ASEAN All-Stars is a selection team of players coming from member associations of the ASEAN Football Federation. South Korean Kim Sang-sik, who is also the concurrent head coach of the Vietnam national football team, was tasked to be the ASEAN All-Stars coach. The team only trained together for two days prior to the Maybank Challenge Cup.

==== Manchester United ====
Manchester United is a 13-time Premier League champion. However the English club is coming off from a poor finish in the 2024–25 season — they placed 15th in the table with 42 points. They also lost the 2025 UEFA Europa League final a week before the friendly, missing a berth in the 2025–26 UEFA Champions League.

United last played in Malaysia in 2009 when it played the Malaysia XI selection twice.

== Squads ==
=== ASEAN All-Stars ===
Players called up for the match against Manchester United

No.	Pos.	Nat.	Player	Date of birth (age)	Club
1	GK	Thailand	Patiwat Khammai	24 December 1994 (aged 30)	(Thailand) Bangkok United
29	GK	Malaysia	Haziq Nadzli	6 January 1998 (aged 27)	(Malaysia) Perak
2	DF	Vietnam	Đỗ Duy Mạnh	29 September 1996 (aged 28)	(Vietnam) Hà Nội
4	DF	Cambodia	Kan Mo	24 September 1992 (aged 32)	(Cambodia) Visakha
5	DF	Vietnam	Nguyễn Văn Vĩ	12 February 1998 (aged 27)	(Vietnam) Nam Định
12	DF	Philippines	Amani Aguinaldo	24 April 1995 (aged 30)	(Thailand) Rayong
15	DF	Malaysia	Declan Lambert	21 September 1998 (aged 26)	(Malaysia) Kuala Lumpur
16	DF	Indonesia	Kakang Rudianto	2 February 2003 (aged 22)	(Indonesia) Persib Bandung
18	DF	Australia	Kealey Adamson	9 March 2003 (aged 22)	(Australia) Macarthur FC
23	DF	Malaysia	Azam Azmi	23 February 1996 (aged 29)	(Malaysia) Terengganu
24	DF	Australia	Harrison Delbridge	15 March 1992 (aged 33)	(South Korea) Incheon United
46	DF	Malaysia	Adib Ra'op	25 October 1999 (aged 25)	(Malaysia) Penang
71	DF	Singapore	Irfan Fandi	13 August 1997 (aged 27)	(Thailand) Port
6	MF	Philippines	Sandro Reyes	29 March 2003 (aged 22)	(Germany) Gütersloh
8	MF	Malaysia	Ezequiel Agüero	7 April 1994 (aged 31)	(Malaysia) Sri Pahang
9	MF	Vietnam	Nguyễn Hai Long	27 August 2000 (aged 24)	(Vietnam) Hà Nội
10	MF	Thailand	Ben Davis	24 November 2000 (aged 24)	(Thailand) Uthai Thani
14	MF	Vietnam	Nguyễn Hoàng Đức	11 January 1998 (aged 27)	(Vietnam) Phù Đổng Ninh Bình
22	MF	Thailand	Worachit Kanitsribampen	24 August 1997 (aged 27)	(Thailand) Port
7	FW	Timor-Leste	João Pedro	24 June 1998 (aged 26)	(Cambodia) Angkor Tiger
11	FW	Myanmar	Maung Maung Lwin	18 June 1995 (aged 29)	(Thailand) Lamphun Warriors
17	FW	Laos	Bounphachan Bounkong	29 November 2000 (aged 24)	(Cambodia) Svay Rieng
19	FW	Australia	Yaya Dukuly	17 January 2003 (aged 22)	(Australia) Adelaide United
20	FW	Cambodia	Abdel Kader Coulibaly	18 June 1993 (aged 31)	(Cambodia) Angkor Tiger
21	FW	Australia	Adrian Segecic	1 June 2004 (aged 20)	(Australia) Sydney FC
77	FW	Indonesia	Malik Risaldi	16 October 1996 (aged 28)	(Indonesia) Persebaya Surabaya

=== Manchester United ===
No.	Pos.	Nat.	Player	Date of birth (age)
1	GK	Turkey	Altay Bayındır	14 April 1998 (aged 27)
22	GK	England	Tom Heaton	15 April 1986 (aged 39)
24	GK	Cameroon	André Onana	2 April 1996 (aged 29)
5	DF	England	Harry Maguire	5 March 1993 (aged 32)
13	DF	Denmark	Patrick Dorgu	26 October 2004 (aged 20)
20	DF	Portugal	Diogo Dalot	18 March 1999 (aged 26)
26	DF	England	Ayden Heaven	22 September 2006 (aged 18)
35	DF	Northern Ireland	Jonny Evans	3 January 1988 (aged 37)
55	DF	England	Tyler Fredricson	23 February 2005 (aged 20)
79	DF	England	Reece Munro	16 December 2006 (aged 18)
80	DF	England	Jaydan Kamason	8 December 2006 (aged 18)
87	DF	England	Godwill Kukonki	6 February 2008 (aged 17)
90	DF	Scotland	Daniel Armer	22 October 2007 (aged 17)
8	MF	Portugal	Bruno Fernandes	8 September 1994 (aged 30)
18	MF	Brazil	Casemiro	23 February 1992 (aged 33)
25	MF	Uruguay	Manuel Ugarte	11 April 2001 (aged 24)
37	MF	England	Kobbie Mainoo	19 April 2005 (aged 20)
41	MF	England	Harry Amass	16 March 2007 (aged 18)
42	MF	Mali	Sékou Koné	3 February 2006 (aged 19)
43	MF	England	Toby Collyer	3 January 2004 (aged 21)
58	MF	Scotland	Tyler Fletcher	19 March 2007 (aged 18)
64	MF	Ireland	Jack Moorhouse	29 November 2005 (aged 19)
92	MF	England	Jim Thwaites	20 December 2007 (aged 17)
9	FW	Denmark	Rasmus Højlund	4 March 2003 (aged 22)
16	FW	Ivory Coast	Amad Diallo	11 July 2002 (aged 22)
17	FW	Argentina	Alejandro Garnacho	1 July 2004 (aged 20)
56	FW	Denmark	Chido Obi	29 November 2007 (aged 17)
72	FW	England	Shea Lacey	14 April 2007 (aged 18)

== Match ==
72,550 people attended the match. The temperature at Bukit Jalil was 30°C with high humidity.

Vietnam's Nguyễn Hai Long and the Philippines' Sandro Reyes forced André Onana into two separate saves, while on the other side, Patiwat Khammai held his grip against Kobbie Mainoo in the 33rd minute. Another of Mainoo's attempts in the 37th minute was cleared off the line by Harrison Delbridge. Patiwat also denied Bruno Fernandes' volley in the 58th minute.

On 71 minutes, Burmese winger Maung Maung Lwin latched onto a through ball from Adrian Segecic, broke Manchester United's offside trap and beat Tom Heaton to score the solitary goal.

The crowd reportedly directed boos at United's players when the final whistle sounded.

28 May 2025
20:45 UTC+8

ASEAN All-Stars	1–0	(England) Manchester United
Maung Maung Lwin 71'	Report (MU1), (MU2); SCW (UK)

Bukit Jalil National Stadium, Kuala Lumpur, Malaysia
Attendance: 72,550
Referee: Nazmi Nasaruddin (Malaysia)

GK	1	(Thailand) Patiwat Khammai	(substituted off) 82'
CB	12	(Philippines) Amani Aguinaldo	(substituted off) 46'
CB	4	(Cambodia) Kan Mo	(substituted off) 64'
CB	24	(Australia) Harrison Delbridge
RM	18	(Australia) Kealey Adamson	(substituted off) 39'
CM	9	(Vietnam) Nguyễn Hai Long	(substituted off) 46'
LM	15	(Malaysia) Declan Lambert	(substituted off) 46'
AM	6	(Philippines) Sandro Reyes	(substituted off) 46'
AM	8	(Malaysia) Ezequiel Agüero (c)	(substituted off) 54'
SS	19	(Australia) Yaya Dukuly	(substituted off) 46'
CF	20	(Cambodia) Abdel Kader Coulibaly	(substituted off) 39'
Substitutes:
DF	46	(Malaysia) Adib Ra'op	(substituted on) 39'	(substituted off) 64'
FW	17	(Laos) Bounphachan Bounkong	(substituted on) 39'	(substituted off) 54'
FW	7	(Timor-Leste) João Pedro	(substituted on) 46'	(substituted off) 82'
DF	71	(Singapore) Irfan Fandi	(substituted on) 46'	(substituted off) 68'
DF	23	(Malaysia) Azam Azmi	(substituted on) 46'	(substituted off) 82'
FW	21	(Australia) Adrian Segecic	(substituted on) 46'
MF	14	(Vietnam) Nguyễn Hoàng Đức	(substituted on) 46'
MF	10	(Thailand) Ben Davis	(substituted on) 54'
FW	11	(Myanmar) Maung Maung Lwin	(substituted on) 54'
DF	2	(Vietnam) Đỗ Duy Mạnh	(substituted on) 64'
DF	5	(Vietnam) Nguyễn Văn Vĩ	(substituted on) 64'
DF	16	(Indonesia) Kakang Rudianto	(substituted on) 68'
FW	77	(Indonesia) Malik Risaldi	(substituted on) 82'
GK	29	(Malaysia) Haziq Nadzli	(substituted on) 82'
MF	22	(Thailand) Worachit Kanitsribampen	(substituted on) 82'
Manager:
(South Korea) Kim Sang-sik

GK	24	(Cameroon) André Onana		(substituted off) 46'
CB	79	(England) Reece Munro		(substituted off) 46'
CB	26	(England) Ayden Heaven		(substituted off) 46'
CB	5	(England) Harry Maguire (c)		(substituted off) 32'
DM	18	(Brazil) Casemiro		(substituted off) 32'
DM	25	(Uruguay) Manuel Ugarte		(substituted off) 46'
RM	20	(Portugal) Diogo Dalot		(substituted off) 32'
CM	37	(England) Kobbie Mainoo		(substituted off) 46'
CM	64	(Republic of Ireland) Jack Moorhouse		(substituted off) 32'
LM	13	(Denmark) Patrick Dorgu		(substituted off) 46'
CF	9	(Denmark) Rasmus Højlund		(substituted off) 46'
Substitutes:
DF	90	(Scotland) Daniel Armer		(substituted on) 32'	(substituted off) 46'
DF	80	(England) Jaydan Kamason		(substituted on) 32'	(substituted off) 46'
FW	72	(England) Shea Lacey		(substituted on) 32'	(substituted off) 46'
MF	42	(Mali) Sékou Koné		(substituted on) 32'	(substituted off) 46'
FW	17	(Argentina) Alejandro Garnacho		(substituted on) 46'
DF	41	(England) Harry Amass		(substituted on) 46'
DF	55	(England) Tyler Fredricson		(substituted on) 46'
MF	8	(Portugal) Bruno Fernandes		(substituted on) 46'
FW	56	(Denmark) Chido Obi		(substituted on) 46'
FW	16	(Ivory Coast) Amad Diallo		(substituted on) 46'
DF	87	(England) Godwill Kukonki	(yellow card) 90+1'	(substituted on) 46'
MF	43	(England) Toby Collyer		(substituted on) 46'
MF	58	(Scotland) Tyler Fletcher		(substituted on) 46'	(substituted off) 67'
DF	35	(Northern Ireland) Jonny Evans		(substituted on) 46'
GK	22	(England) Tom Heaton		(substituted on) 46'
MF	92	(England) Jim Thwaites		(substituted on) 67'
Manager:
(Portugal) Rúben Amorim
