= 2026–27 Manchester United F.C. season =

English football club season

Manchester United
2026–27 season
- Owner: Manchester United plc (71.06%); Ineos (28.94%)
- Co-chairmen: Joel and Avram Glazer
- Head coach: Michael Carrick (until 12 November); Mauricio Pochettino (from 18 November)
- Stadium: Old Trafford
- Premier League: 19th
- FA Cup: Third round
- EFL Cup: Third round
- UEFA Champions League: League phase, 17th
- Top goalscorer: League: Bruno Fernandes; Bryan Mbeumo (4 each); All: Bruno Fernandes (6)
- Highest home attendance: 74,161 (v. Manchester City, 13 September 2026)
- Lowest home attendance: 73,670 (v. Brighton & Hove Albion, 16 September 2026)
- Average home league attendance: 74,147
Home colours	Away colours	Third colours
- All statistics correct as of 8 November 2026.

The 2026–27 season is the 140th in the history of Manchester United, their 35th in the Premier League, and their 52nd consecutive and 102nd overall season in the top flight of English football. The club are competing in the Premier League, the FA Cup, the EFL Cup and the UEFA Champions League, making their first appearance in the Champions League since the 2023–24 season.

Before the season started, Michael Carrick was appointed permanent head coach on a two-year contract, but was dismissed after 4 months in charge.

As of November 2026, the season was widely regarded as the worst in the club's modern history with only 3 wins after 16 matches, and a record of nine consecutive matches without a win for the first time since the 1988–89 season. The club's situation worsened on 7 November when a 3–1 victory for Nottingham Forest against Manchester City pushed United into the relegation zone after nine games played for the first time ever in Premier League history, and only for the ninth time since 1986–87.

== Pre-season and friendlies ==
On 2 April, United confirmed a trip to Dublin to face Leeds United as part of their pre-season preparations. On 9 April, United confirmed an additional four fixtures, against Wrexham in Helsinki, against Rosenborg in Trondheim, against Atlético Madrid in Stockholm and against Paris Saint-Germain in Gothenburg.

United lost their first match of pre-season against Wrexham 1–0 as Sam Smith scored the only goal of the game. United won the next two matches, 5–0 over Rosenborg and 2–1 over Atlético Madrid, followed by 1–1 draws to Paris Saint-Germain and Leeds United. Manchester United lost their final preseason match 4–2 to a Milan side coached by former United manager Ruben Amorim.

Date	Opponents	H / A	Result F–A	Scorers	Attendance
18 July 2026	Wrexham	N	0–1		20,069
24 July 2026	Rosenborg	A	5–0	Lacey 31', Zirkzee 55', Devaney 62', Amass 72', Williams 84'	7,000
1 August 2026	Atlético Madrid	N	2–1	Mbeumo (2) 53' (pen.), 74'	30,000
8 August 2026	Paris Saint-Germain	N	1–1	Mbeumo 32'	25,000
12 August 2026	Leeds United	N	1–1 (5–4p)	Zirkzee 16'	82,300
15 August 2026	Milan	N	2–4	Maguire 2', Dorgu 51'	20,000

== Premier League ==
United's place in the 2026–27 Premier League was confirmed on 15 March 2026. It is their 35th season in the Premier League. The league fixtures were released on 19 June 2026.

=== Matches ===
Date	Opponents	H / A	Result F–A	Scorers	Attendance	League position
22 August 2026	Hull City	A	0–2		24,470	17th
30 August 2026	Ipswich Town	H	5–2	Fernandes (3) 40', 61' (pen.), 68', Greaves 56' (o.g.), Mbeumo 82'	74,148	10th
6 September 2026	Everton	A	2–2	Mbeumo 46', Šeško 88'	52,302	11th
13 September 2026	Manchester City	H	0–1		74,161	13th
20 September 2026	Fulham	A	1–1	Cunha 89'	27,288	13th
10 October 2026	Tottenham Hotspur	H	1–1	Mbeumo 73'	74,129	13th
18 October 2026	Leeds United	A	1–1	Mbeumo 35'	36,983	13th
25 October 2026	Bournemouth	H	0–3		74,142	16th
31 October 2026	Chelsea	A	0–2		39,503	17th
8 November 2026	Aston Villa	H	4–4	Fernandes 16' (pen.), Tielemans 44', Zirkzee 90+2', Dorgu 90+6'	74,149	18th
22 November 2026	Liverpool	A	0–4			19th
28 November 2026	Brentford	H				
2 December 2026	Newcastle United	A				
5 December 2026	Coventry City	H				
13 December 2026	Crystal Palace	A				
20 December 2026	Arsenal	A				
27 December 2026	Nottingham Forest	H				
30 December 2026	Sunderland	H				
2 January 2027	Brighton & Hove Albion	A				
7 January 2027	Newcastle United	H				
16 January 2027	Aston Villa	A				
23 January 2027	Liverpool	H				
30 January 2027	Brentford	A				
6 February 2027	Chelsea	H				
10 February 2027	Brighton & Hove Albion	H				
20 February 2027	Nottingham Forest	A				
27 February 2027	Arsenal	H				
3 March 2027	Sunderland	A				
13 March 2027	Everton	H				
20 March 2027	Manchester City	A				
10 April 2027	Hull City	H				
17 April 2027	Ipswich Town	A				
24 April 2027	Crystal Palace	H				
1 May 2027	Coventry City	A				
8 May 2027	Bournemouth	A				
15 May 2027	Leeds United	H				
23 May 2027	Tottenham Hotspur	A				
30 May 2027	Fulham	H				

=== League table ===
Pos	Team	Pld	W	D	L	GF	GA	GD	Pts	Qualification or relegation
16	Ipswich Town	11	3	2	6	15	22	−7	11	
17	Nottingham Forest	11	2	3	6	9	15	−6	9	
18	Sunderland	11	2	3	6	8	17	−9	9	Relegation to EFL Championship
19	Manchester United	11	1	5	5	14	23	−9	8	Relegation to EFL Championship
20	Crystal Palace	11	2	1	8	12	27	−15	7	Relegation to EFL Championship

Updated to match(es) played on 22 November 2026. Source: Premier League
Rules for classification: 1) Points; 2) Goal difference; 3) Goals scored; 4) If the champions, relegated teams or qualified teams for UEFA competitions cannot be determined by rules 1 to 3 following the completion of the competition, rules 4.1 to 4.3 are applied between such teams – 4.1) Head-to-head points; 4.2) Head-to-head away goals; 4.3) Play-off at a neutral site.

== FA Cup ==
As a Premier League side, United will enter the 2026–27 FA Cup in the third round.

Date	Round	Opponents TBD	H / A	Result F–A	Scorers	Attendance
9/10 January 2027	Third round					

== EFL Cup ==
As United are playing in European competition, they entered the 2026–27 EFL Cup in the third round. The draw for the third round took place on 26 August, and paired United with fellow Premier League side Brighton & Hove Albion. The game was played in the week of 14 September to avoid a clash with matchday 1 of the 2026–27 UEFA Champions League. After going 2–0 up inside the opening 10 minutes thanks to goals from Shea Lacey (on his full debut) and Mason Mount, United conceded on the stroke of half-time before Brighton scored twice in five minutes midway through the second half to give them a 3–2 win. It was the first time United had lost at home after holding a two-goal lead since a 3–2 defeat to Tottenham Hotspur in 1976.

Date	Round	Opponents	H / A	Result F–A	Scorers	Attendance
16 September 2026	Third round	Brighton & Hove Albion	H	2–3	Lacey 8', Mount 10'	73,670

== UEFA Champions League ==
United qualified for the league phase of the 2026–27 UEFA Champions League on 3 May 2026, when they confirmed a top-five finish in the 2025–26 Premier League.

=== League phase ===
The draw for the league phase took place on 27 August. United were placed in pot 2 for the draw, along with Dortmund, Roma, Sporting CP, Aston Villa, Porto, Club Brugge, Betis and PSV Eindhoven. They were drawn against Bayern Munich and Atlético Madrid from pot 1, Roma and Sporting CP from pot 2, RB Leipzig and Villarreal from pot 3, and Sabah and Como from pot 4. Fixtures were announced on 29 August, with United opening their campaign at home to Sabah on 10 September and concluding away to Villarreal on 27 January.

Date	Opponents	H / A	Result F–A	Scorers	Attendance	League position
10 September 2026	Sabah	H	4–0	Cunha 27', Fernandes 42', Šeško 45', Martínez 68'	73,685	4th
13 October 2026	Atlético Madrid	A	0–2		69,493	13th
21 October 2026	Como	A	1–4	Zirkzee 90+1'	10,875	20th
3 November 2026	Roma	H	3–2	Fernandes 58' (pen.), Cunha (2) 83', 86'	73,746	17th
25 November 2026	Sporting CP	A				
8 December 2026	RB Leipzig	H				
20 January 2027	Bayern Munich	H				
27 January 2027	Villarreal	A				

=== Table ===
The top eight teams will advance directly to the round of 16. The teams ranked from 9th to 24th will compete in the knockout phase play-offs, with the teams ranked from 9th to 16th seeded for the draw. Teams ranked from 25th to 36th will be eliminated from European competition.

Pos	Team	Pld	W	D	L	GF	GA	GD	Pts	Qualification
15	(Italy) Inter Milan	4	2	0	2	8	6	+2	6	Advance to knockout phase play-offs (seeded)
16	(Austria) LASK	4	2	0	2	10	9	+1	6	Advance to knockout phase play-offs (seeded)
17	(England) Manchester United	4	2	0	2	8	8	0	6	Advance to knockout phase play-offs (unseeded)
18	(Turkey) Galatasaray	4	2	0	2	8	9	−1	6	Advance to knockout phase play-offs (unseeded)
19	(Turkey) Fenerbahçe	4	1	2	1	6	11	−5	5	Advance to knockout phase play-offs (unseeded)

Updated to match(es) played on 4 November 2026. Source: UEFA
Rules for classification: League phase tiebreakers

== Squad statistics ==
As of match played 8 November 2026

No.	Pos.	Name	League		FA Cup		League Cup		Champions League		Total		Discipline	
No.	Pos.	Name	Apps	Goals	Apps	Goals	Apps	Goals	Apps	Goals	Apps	Goals	Yellow card	Red card
1	GK	(Belgium) Senne Lammens	10	0	0	0	0	0	4	0	14	0	0	0
2	DF	(Portugal) Diogo Dalot	8(2)	0	0	0	1	0	3	0	12(2)	0	2	0
3	DF	(Morocco) Noussair Mazraoui	2(3)	0	0	0	1	0	2	0	5(3)	0	0	0
4	DF	(Netherlands) Matthijs de Ligt	0	0	0	0	0	0	1(1)	0	1(1)	0	0	0
5	DF	(England) Harry Maguire	10	0	0	0	0	0	2(1)	0	12(1)	0	5	0
6	DF	(Argentina) Lisandro Martínez	7(1)	0	0	0	0	0	2(1)	1	9(2)	1	1	1
7	MF	(England) Mason Mount	1(4)	0	0	0	1	1	1(3)	0	3(7)	1	0	0
8	MF	(Portugal) Bruno Fernandes	9	4	0	0	0(1)	0	4	2	13(1)	6	3	0
9	FW	(England) Marcus Rashford	4(2)	0	0	0	1	0	1	0	6(2)	0	1	0
10	FW	(Brazil) Matheus Cunha	8(2)	1	0	0	0(1)	0	3(1)	3	11(4)	4	2	1
11	FW	(Netherlands) Joshua Zirkzee	0(6)	1	0	0	0(1)	0	0(3)	1	0(10)	2	0	0
12	GK	(Wales) Karl Darlow	0	0	0	0	1	0	0	0	1	0	0	0
13	DF	(Denmark) Patrick Dorgu	2(4)	1	0	0	0	0	1	0	3(4)	1	2	0
15	DF	(France) Leny Yoro	5(2)	0	0	0	1	0	3	0	9(2)	0	0	1
16	FW	(Ivory Coast) Amad Diallo	5	0	0	0	0	0	1(2)	0	6(2)	0	0	0
17	MF	(Brazil) Andrey Santos	4(2)	0	0	0	1	0	2(1)	0	7(3)	0	3	0
18	MF	(Belgium) Youri Tielemans	9	1	0	0	1	0	3(1)	0	13(1)	1	1	0
19	FW	(Cameroon) Bryan Mbeumo	10	4	0	0	0(1)	0	4	0	14(1)	4	2	0
20	MF	(Cameroon) Carlos Baleba	3(1)	0	0	0	0	0	2(1)	0	5(2)	0	1	0
22	GK	(England) Tom Heaton	0	0	0	0	0	0	0	0	0	0	0	0
23	DF	(England) Luke Shaw	5	0	0	0	0	0	0	0	5	0	2	0
25	MF	(Uruguay) Manuel Ugarte	0	0	0	0	0	0	0	0	0	0	0	0
26	DF	(England) Ayden Heaven	2(3)	0	0	0	1	0	2	0	5(3)	0	3	0
27	FW	(England) Tynan Thompson	0	0	0	0	0	0	0	0	0	0	0	0
30	FW	(Slovenia) Benjamin Šeško	0(4)	1	0	0	1	0	1	1	2(4)	2	0	0
31	FW	(England) Shea Lacey	0(3)	0	0	0	1	1	0(3)	0	1(6)	1	1	0
37	MF	(England) Kobbie Mainoo	6(2)	0	0	0	0(1)	0	2	0	8(3)	0	1	0
38	MF	(England) Jack Fletcher	0	0	0	0	0	0	0	0	0	0	0	0
39	MF	(Scotland) Tyler Fletcher	0	0	0	0	0	0	0	0	0	0	0	0
41	DF	(England) Harry Amass	0	0	0	0	0	0	0(2)	0	0(2)	0	0	0
45	GK	(Northern Ireland) Dermot Mee	0	0	0	0	0	0	0	0	0	0	0	0
56	DF	(England) Jaydan Kamason	0	0	0	0	0	0	0	0	0	0	0	0
57	DF	(Scotland) Dan Armer	0	0	0	0	0	0	0	0	0	0	0	0
Own goals			—	1	—	0	—	0	—	0	—	1	—	

== Transfers ==
=== In ===
Date	Pos.	Name	From	Fee	Ref.
13 July 2026	MF	(Brazil) Andrey Santos	(England) Chelsea	Undisclosed (Note: Reported as £48 million)	
14 July 2026	GK	(Wales) Karl Darlow	(England) Leeds United	Free	
14 July 2026	MF	(Belgium) Youri Tielemans	(England) Aston Villa	Undisclosed (Note: Reported as £35 million)	
20 July 2026	FW	(England) Tynan Thompson	(England) Tottenham Hotspur	Undisclosed (Note: Reported as £4 million plus £4 million in add-ons)	
27 July 2026	GK	(Wales) Kit Margetson	(Wales) Swansea City	Undisclosed	
7 August 2026	MF	(Colombia) Cristian Orozco	(Colombia) Fortaleza	Undisclosed	
25 August 2026	MF	(Cameroon) Carlos Baleba	(England) Brighton & Hove Albion	Undisclosed (Note: Reported as £65 million plus £5 million in add-ons)	
24 September 2026	MF	(England) Karim Cassim	(England) Manchester City	Undisclosed	
26 September 2026	MF	(England) David Eze	(England) Manchester City	Undisclosed	
28 September 2026	FW	(England) Isaac Konde	(England) Liverpool	Undisclosed	

=== Out ===
Date	Pos.	Name	To	Fee	Ref.
29 June 2026 (Note: The transfer was announced on 3 June and would become official on June 29 once the Serie A transfer window opened.)	FW	(Denmark) Rasmus Højlund	(Italy) Napoli	Undisclosed (Note: Reported as £43.2 million (£5 million loan fee for 2025–26 season) plus £38 million obligation to buy.)	
30 June 2026	DF	(England) Sonny Aljofree	Unattached (Note: Joined Rotherham United on 7 August 2026)	Released	
30 June 2026	DF	(Netherlands) Tyrell Malacia	Unattached (Note: Joined Cincinnati on 18 September 2026)	Released	
30 June 2026	MF	(England) James Bailey	(England) Stockport County	Released	
30 June 2026	MF	(Brazil) Casemiro	Unattached (Note: Joined Inter Miami on 22 July 2026)	Released	
30 June 2026	FW	(England) Jadon Sancho	Unattached	Released	
30 June 2026	FW	(Scotland) Malachi Sharpe	Unattached	Released	
30 July 2026	DF	(England) Tyler Fredricson	(Switzerland) Lausanne-Sport	Undisclosed	
8 August 2026	GK	(Czech Republic) Radek Vítek	(England) Middlesbrough	Undisclosed (Note: Reported as £7 million, plus £7 million in performance-based add-ons.)	
13 August 2026	FW	(England) Ethan Williams	(England) Peterborough United	Undisclosed	
17 August 2026	FW	(England) Ethan Ennis	(England) Stockport County	Undisclosed	
29 August 2026	MF	(Gibraltar) James Scanlon	(England) Arsenal	Undisclosed	
30 August 2026	MF	(England) Toby Collyer	(England) West Bromwich Albion	Undisclosed (Note: Reported as £3 million, plus £4.6 million in performance-based add-ons.)	
30 August 2026	DF	(Scotland) Louis Jackson	(Scotland) St Mirren	Undisclosed	
30 August 2026	DF	(England) Habeeb Ogunneye	(England) Arsenal	Undisclosed	
3 September 2026	FW	(Wales) Gabriele Biancheri	(Austria) Wacker Innsbruck	Undisclosed	
4 September 2026	FW	(Wales) Louie Bradbury	(England) Stoke City	Undisclosed	
7 September 2026	DF	(Australia) James Overy	(Australia) Sydney	Undisclosed	

=== Loan out ===
Date	Pos.	Name	To	Until	Ref.
3 July 2026	GK	(Cameroon) André Onana	(Turkey) Trabzonspor	End of season	
17 July 2026	GK	(England) Solomon Honor	(England) Southport	End of season	
24 July 2026	MF	(Mali) Sékou Koné	(Switzerland) Lausanne-Sport	End of season	
28 July 2026	GK	(England) Elyh Harrison	(Scotland) Greenock Morton	End of season	
7 August 2026	GK	(Turkey) Altay Bayındır	(Spain) Celta Vigo	End of season	
23 August 2026	MF	(Republic of Ireland) Jacob Devaney	(Scotland) Hibernian	End of season	
24 August 2026	FW	(England) Ethan Wheatley	(England) Lincoln City	End of season	
31 August 2026	MF	(England) Jayce Fitzgerald	(England) Rotherham United	End of season	
31 August 2026	MF	(England) Dan Gore	(England) Luton Town	End of season	
2 September 2026	MF	(Republic of Ireland) Jack Moorhouse	(Scotland) Dundee	End of season	
2 September 2026	FW	(Denmark) Chido Obi	(Netherlands) Willem II	End of season	
8 September 2026	MF	(England) Finley McAllister	(England) Radcliffe	8 October 2026	
18 September 2026	GK	(Northern Ireland) William Murdock	(England) Hednesford Town	5 January 2027	

== Awards ==
=== Player awards ===
==== Premier League Goal of the Month ====
Month	Pos.	Player	Opposition	Result	Ref.
September	FW	(Cameroon) Bryan Mbeumo	v. Everton	Nominated	
