= Cristian Orozco =

Colombian footballer (born 2008)

Personal information
- Full name: Cristian Camilo Orozco Valdés
- Date of birth: 13 July 2008 (age 18)
- Place of birth: Valledupar, Colombia
- Height: 1.78 m (5 ft 10 in)
- Position: Defensive midfielder

Team information
- Current team: Manchester United

Youth career
- Rojo FC
- 2026–: Manchester United

Senior career*
Years	Team	Apps	(Gls)
–2025	Rojo FC		
2025–2026	Fortaleza	4	(0)

International career^{‡}
2022	Colombia U15	2	(0)
2025	Colombia U17	13	(0)
- * Club domestic league appearances and goals ‡ National team caps and goals as of 14 November 2025

Cristian Camilo Orozco Valdés (born 13 July 2008) is a Colombian professional footballer who plays as a defensive midfielder for Manchester United.

== Early life ==
Orozco was born on 13 July 2008. Born in Colombia, he is a native of Valledupar, Colombia.

Growing up, he started playing football at the age of five. At the age of fourteen, he moved to Antioquia Department, Colombia.

== Club career ==
Orozco joined the youth academy of Colombian side Rojo FC and was promoted to the club's senior team. Following his stint there, signed for Colombian side Fortaleza, where he made four league appearances and scored zero goals and was regarded to have failed to establish himself as a regular starter while playing for the club. On 12 February 2026, he debuted for them during a 1–4 away loss to Atlético Nacional in the league.

Ahead of the 2026–27 season, he joined the youth academy of English Premier League side Manchester United. Upon signing for them, he became the third Colombian player to sign for them after Colombia international Radamel Falcao in 2014 and Mateo Mejía in 2019.

== International career ==
Orozco is a Colombia youth international and represented the country internationally at under-15 and under-17 level. During the autumn of 2024, he played for the Colombia national under-15 football team at the 2023 South American U-15 Championship.

During the spring of 2025, he played for the Colombia national under-17 football team at the 2025 South American U-17 Championship. The same year, he played for the Colombia national under-17 football team at the 2025 FIFA U-17 World Cup, where he captained the team.

== Style of play ==
Orozco plays as a midfielder. Right-footed, he has played as a defender.

Spanish news website Flashscore wrote in 2025 he "is known for his physical presence, power, and excellent ball distribution... his natural position is as a defensive midfielder. He is 1.78 meters tall and weighs 72 kg. Although not a particularly imposing defensive midfielder, he possesses an impressive ability to win the ball back and, especially, to distribute it effectively".
