= Azri Zahari =

Bruneian footballer

Personal information
- Full name: Mohammad Azri bin Zahari
- Date of birth: 12 February 1992 (age 34)
- Place of birth: Brunei
- Height: 1.67 m (5 ft 5 1/2 in)
- Positions: Full-back; striker

Senior career*
Years	Team	Apps	(Gls)
2009–2013	Majra FC		(2)
2014–2016	Najip I-Team		(15)
2017–2020	MS PDB		(3)

International career^{‡}
2008–2010	Brunei U18		
2011–2015	Brunei U23	12	(0)
2012	Brunei U21	6	(0)
2012–2015	Brunei	4	(0)
- * Club domestic league appearances and goals as of 4 January 2019 ‡ National team caps and goals as of 19 June 2019

Mohammad Azri bin Zahari (born 12 February 1992) is a Bruneian footballer who last played for MS PDB as a full-back or striker. A versatile player who is adept at playing on both flanks as a full-back, Azri can also play in central defence, midfield or even as a striker, scoring 12 goals in the 2015 season operating as a forward for his club.

== Club career ==
Azri began his career with Majra FC in the Brunei Premier League I in 2009, alongside future international teammate Adi Said. Majra won the Brunei League Cup in 2011, the last time the competition was held. He was converted into a forward by his club coach in 2012, who saw his pace as crucial to the team's attacking play.

Azri moved to a restructured Najip FC in 2014, a team that lost every game in the previous season. Now with reliable players like Aminuddin Zakwan Tahir and Ratano Tuah, Najip FC managed to finish third with Azri playing as a makeshift centre-back. In the following season when the club was renamed Najip I-Team, Azri frequently played in offence, hitting the net 12 times including 4 goals against IKLS FC. They repeated their feat in the 2016 season, becoming the third-placed team at the end of the campaign.

Azri moved to MS PDB for the 2017 Brunei Super League season. He scored his first goal for the Policemen on 29 April against Tabuan Muda 'A'.

== International career ==
Azri was the first-choice right-back for the Wasps of Borneo, appearing for the team at youth level at three Southeast Asian Games tournaments, and was part of the triumphant squad that won the Hassanal Bolkiah Trophy in 2012.

Azri played 4 games at the 2011 SEA Games in Jakarta, where Brunei came second from bottom in Group B. The 2013 edition held in Myanmar saw winless Brunei finish last in their group, and Azri was ever-present at right-back. Picked again for the 2015 SEA Games in Singapore, a team spearheaded by Prince Faiq Bolkiah failed to match the hype as they lost all of their five games. Azri appeared four times, rested once for the game against Thailand.

Rather than the disappointment of his Under-23 outings, Azri is best remembered by his performances with the Under-21s at the 2012 Hassanal Bolkiah Trophy. Selected as one of five permitted overage players, he played all six games en route to winning the cup on home soil.

Azri's first match for the senior squad was against Indonesia on 26 September 2012 which finished 0–5. He was selected for the 2012 AFF Suzuki Cup qualification matches but was not fielded by Kwon Oh-son. He played in both legs of the 2018 FIFA World Cup qualifiers against Chinese Taipei in March 2015.

== Honours ==
=== Team ===
Majra FC

- Brunei League Cup: 2011

Brunei national under-21 football team

- Hassanal Bolkiah Trophy: 2012

=== Individual ===
- ASEAN All-Stars: 2014
- Meritorious Service Medal (PJK; 2012)
