= Kim Sang-sik =

South Korean football manager (born 1972)

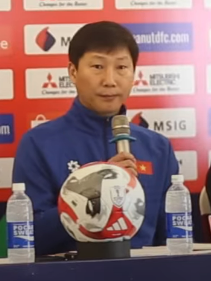
- Kim with Vietnam national team in 2024

Personal information
- Full name: Kim Sang-sik
- Date of birth: 17 December 1976 (age 49)
- Place of birth: Haenam, Jeonnam, South Korea
- Height: 1.85 m (6 ft 1 in)
- Position: Centre-back

Team information
- Current team: Vietnam (manager)

College career
| Years | Team | Apps | (Gls) |
| 1995–1998 | Daegu University | | |

Senior career*
| Years | Team | Apps | (Gls) |
| 1999–2008 | Seongnam Ilhwa Chunma | 195 | (11) |
| 2003–2004 | → Gwangju Sangmu (draft) | 62 | (3) |
| 2009–2013 | Jeonbuk Hyundai Motors | 121 | (1) |
| Total | | 378 | (15) |

International career
| 2000 | South Korea U23 | 4 (Note: Appearances as an overage player (three appearances in Summer Olympics, one appearance in friendlies)) | (0) |
| 2000–2012 | South Korea | 59 | (2) |

Managerial career
- 2013–2020: Jeonbuk Hyundai Motors (assistant)
- 2020–2023: Jeonbuk Hyundai Motors
- 2024–: Vietnam
- 2024–: Vietnam U23
Medal record
Men's football
Representing South Korea (as player)
AFC Asian Cup
| Bronze medal – third place | 2000 Lebanon |
| Bronze medal – third place | 2007 Indonesia/Malaysia /Thailand/Vietnam |
Representing Vietnam (as manager)
AFC U-23 Asian Cup
| Bronze medal – third place | 2026 Saudi Arabia |
ASEAN Championship
| Winner | 2024 |
| Winner | 2026 |
SEA Games
| Gold medal – first place | 2025 Thailand |
ASEAN U-23 Championship
| Winner | 2025 Indonesia |
Korean name
| Hangul | 김상식 |
| Hanja | 金相植 |
| RR | Gim Sangsik |
| MR | Kim Sangsik |
- * Club domestic league appearances and goals

Kim Sang-sik (Korean: 김상식; Hanja: 金相植; born 17 December 1976) is a South Korean football manager and former player. During his playing career, he played for the South Korea national team as a centre-back or a defensive midfielder. He is currently manager of Vietnam and Vietnam U23, and is considered one of the greatest managers in Vietnamese football history.

== Club career ==
In 1999, Kim joined Seongnam Ilhwa Chunma, significantly contributing to Seongnam's consecutive K League championships in 2001 and 2002. He joined the military club Gwangju Sangmu in 2003 to perform his military service, and returned to Seongnam in 2005. He once again contributed to a K League title in 2006.

Because of the team's negative performance in 2008 and the transition from coach Kim Hak-bum to Shin Tae-yong, Kim transferred to Jeonbuk Hyundai Motors in January 2009 as a part of the team's restructuring. He was appointed the new captain of the team.

On 26 November 2013, Kim announced his retirement. In his final match against FC Seoul, Kim scored on a penalty kick, ending his playing career on a high note.

== International career ==
On 29 May 2000, Kim debuted for the South Korea national team in a friendly match against Yugoslavia.

Kim was selected for the national team for the 2006 FIFA World Cup, and played two Group G matches as a substitute.

In the 2007 AFC Asian Cup, he replaced injured defensive midfielder Kim Nam-il and helped South Korea reach the semi-finals. However, Kim was involved in a drinking scandal with captain Lee Woon-jae and some others during the tournament, resulting in a one-year suspension from the national team and a two-year ban from competitions organized by the Korea Football Association.

After nearly five years, in February 2012, Kim returned to the national team prior to a friendly against Uzbekistan and a World Cup qualifier against Kuwait. He retired from the national team after these matches.

== Managerial career ==
=== Jeonbuk Hyundai Motors ===
After retiring at the end of 2013, he went to France to receive coaching training. He returned to Jeonbuk in 2014 and worked as an assistant coach under managers Choi Kang-hee and José Morais.

On 7 December 2020, he participated in the Pro License course of Asian Football Confederation Coach Education. Subsequently, on 22 December 2020, he was appointed manager of Jeonbuk, succeeding Morais. He became the first Jeonbuk player to manage the team.

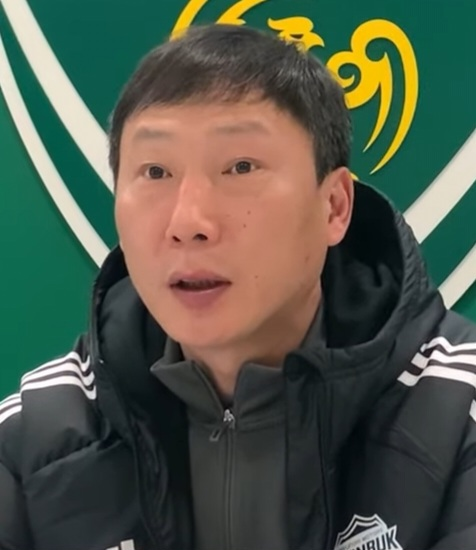
Kim Sang-sik as a manager of Jeonbuk Hyundai Motors

In the 2021 season, his first season as a manager, he led Jeonbuk to the K League 1 title. He became the first person to win the league title with Jeonbuk as a player, coach and manager. He was also the third to achieve this feat, following Cho Kwang-rae and Choi Yong-soo. He was awarded the K League Manager of the Year Award after the season.

In 2022, however, Jeonbuk gradually focused on defense and counterattack due to Kim's monotonous tactics in contrast with previous managers, and he was criticized for losing Jeonbuk's style of play. Despite this criticism, he renewed his contract with the club after winning the Korean FA Cup.

Early in the 2023 season, Kim failed to improve the team's weaknesses, and Jeonbuk ranked tenth among twelve clubs after winning only three of ten matches. On 4 May 2023, he resigned, ending his 15-year term with Jeonbuk.

=== Vietnam ===
On 3 May 2024, Kim was appointed manager of Vietnam's senior and under-23 national teams, following Philippe Troussier's departure. He hired Choi Won-kwon as his assistant and started building his team. On 6 June, he made his debut as Vietnam's manager in a World Cup qualifier against the Philippines, ending Vietnam's eight-match losing streak with a 3–2 victory. Between December 2024 and January 2025, Kim led Vietnam to win the 2024 ASEAN Championship. He sent his team to the semi-finals by earning three wins and one draw in the group stage including victories over compatriots Ha Hyeok-jun and Shin Tae-yong, who managed Laos and Indonesia respectively. He became Vietnam's third manager and the second Korean manager to win an ASEAN Championship title after defeating Thailand in both legs of the final.

On 10 April 2025, ASEAN Football Federation appointed Kim manager of the ASEAN All-Stars for a friendly against Manchester United named the Maybank Challenge Cup at Bukit Jalil National Stadium in Malaysia on 28 May. He defeated Rúben Amorim's Manchester United side 1–0. On 29 July, he won the 2025 ASEAN U-23 Championship for Vietnam's third consecutive title in the competition. At the 2025 SEA Games, he won all four matches including a 3–2 final win over Thailand on 18 December.

While participating at the 2026 AFC U-23 Asian Cup in January 2026, Kim and Vietnam won all matches against Jordan, Kyrgyzstan, Saudi Arabia, and the United Arab Emirates before lost 3–0 to China in the semi-finals. In the third place play-off, his team defeated his homeland South Korea 7–6 on penalties after a 2–2 draw with them. During July and August, he led Vietnam to the second consecutive ASEAN Championship victory. Despite a goalless draw with Singapore, he guided the team to first place of the Group A by defeating Timor-Leste, Indonesia and Cambodia. After two 2–0 wins over Malaysia in the semi-finals, Vietnam faced Thailand again in the final. He became Vietnam's first-ever manager to defend the ASEAN Championship title, as they beat Thailand 4–2 on aggregate. However, during the 2026 FIFA ASEAN Cup, he led Vietnam to the fourth place followed by narrow defeat against Malaysia in the third place match.

== Personal life ==
Kim is married and has two children, a son currently in university and a high school-aged daughter. He mentioned Choi Kang-hee and Kim Hak-bum as his major coaching influences.

During his tenure as Vietnam's manager, he was nicknamed the "Dark Magician" (lit. 'Ma thuật đen') by Vietnamese football fans, a moniker reflecting his uncanny ability to pull off highly effective and often unpredictable tactical moves, including bold adjustments and decisive second-half substitutions that delivered victories even when the team's overall gameplay appeared shaky or unconvincing.

== Career statistics ==
=== Club ===
Appearances and goals by club, season and competition
| Club | Season | League | | | National cup | | League cup | | Continental | | Total | |
| Club | Season | Division | Apps | Goals | Apps | Goals | Apps | Goals | Apps | Goals | Apps | Goals |
|---|---|---|---|---|---|---|---|---|---|---|---|---|
| Seongnam Ilhwa Chunma | 1999 | K League | 26 | 1 | ? | ? | 10 | 0 | — | | 36 | 1 |
| Seongnam Ilhwa Chunma | 2000 | K League | 19 | 2 | ? | ? | 8 | 1 | ? | ? | 27 | 3 |
| Seongnam Ilhwa Chunma | 2001 | K League | 25 | 0 | ? | ? | 7 | 0 | ? | ? | 32 | 0 |
| Seongnam Ilhwa Chunma | 2002 | K League | 25 | 2 | ? | ? | 11 | 2 | — | | 36 | 4 |
| Seongnam Ilhwa Chunma | 2005 | K League | 22 | 1 | 1 | 0 | 8 | 0 | — | | 31 | 1 |
| Seongnam Ilhwa Chunma | 2006 | K League | 25 | 1 | 0 | 0 | 4 | 0 | — | | 29 | 1 |
| Seongnam Ilhwa Chunma | 2007 | K League | 27 | 4 | 0 | 0 | 1 | 0 | 10 | 0 | 38 | 4 |
| Seongnam Ilhwa Chunma | 2008 | K League | 26 | 0 | 0 | 0 | 11 | 0 | — | | 37 | 0 |
| Seongnam Ilhwa Chunma | Total | | 195 | 11 | 1 | 0 | 60 | 3 | 10 | 0 | 266 | 14 |
| Gwangju Sangmu | 2003 | K League | 42 | 2 | 2 | 0 | — | | — | | 44 | 2 |
| Gwangju Sangmu | 2004 | K League | 20 | 1 | 0 | 0 | 11 | 1 | — | | 31 | 2 |
| Gwangju Sangmu | Total | | 62 | 3 | 2 | 0 | 11 | 1 | — | | 75 | 4 |
| Jeonbuk Hyundai Motors | 2009 | K League | 30 | 0 | 4 | 0 | 3 | 0 | — | | 37 | 0 |
| Jeonbuk Hyundai Motors | 2010 | K League | 22 | 0 | 2 | 0 | 6 | 0 | 6 | 0 | 36 | 0 |
| Jeonbuk Hyundai Motors | 2011 | K League | 22 | 0 | 0 | 0 | 0 | 0 | 8 | 0 | 30 | 0 |
| Jeonbuk Hyundai Motors | 2012 | K League | 27 | 0 | ? | ? | 0 | 0 | 6 | 0 | 33 | 0 |
| Jeonbuk Hyundai Motors | 2013 | K League 1 | 20 | 1 | ? | ? | 0 | 0 | 6 | 0 | 26 | 1 |
| Jeonbuk Hyundai Motors | Total | | 121 | 1 | 6 | 0 | 9 | 0 | 26 | 0 | 162 | 1 |
| Career total | | | 378 | 15 | 9 | 0 | 80 | 4 | 36 | 0 | 503 | 19 |

=== International ===
Appearances and goals by national team and year
| National team | Year | Apps | Goals |
|---|---|---|---|
| South Korea | 2000 | 14 | 1 |
| South Korea | 2001 | 4 | 0 |
| South Korea | 2002 | 3 | 0 |
| South Korea | 2003 | 2 | 0 |
| South Korea | 2004 | 1 | 0 |
| South Korea | 2005 | 7 | 1 |
| South Korea | 2006 | 16 | 0 |
| South Korea | 2007 | 10 | 0 |
| South Korea | 2012 | 2 | 0 |
| Total | | 59 | 2 |

Results list South Korea's goal tally first.

List of international goals scored by Kim Sang-sik
| No. | Date | Venue | Opponent | Score | Result | Competition |
|---|---|---|---|---|---|---|
| 1 | 23 October 2000 | Tripoli, Lebanon | Iran | 1–1 | 2–1 (a.e.t.) | 2000 AFC Asian Cup |
| 2 | 20 March 2005 | Dubai, United Arab Emirates | Burkina Faso | 1–0 | 1–0 | Friendly |

== Managerial statistics ==
As of match played 17 November 2026

Managerial record by team and tenure
| Team | From | To | Record | | | | | Ref. |
| Team | From | To | Pld | W | D | L | Win % | Ref. |
|---|---|---|---|---|---|---|---|---|
| Jeonbuk Hyundai Motors | 22 December 2020 | 4 May 2023 | 109 | 60 | 29 | 20 | 55.05 | |
| Vietnam | 3 May 2024 | Present | 36 | 26 | 4 | 6 | 72.22 | |
| Vietnam U23 | 3 May 2024 | Present | 23 | 17 | 4 | 2 | 73.91 | |
| Total | | | 168 | 103 | 37 | 28 | 61.31 | |

== Honours ==
=== Player ===
Seongnam Ilhwa Chunma

- K League 1: 2001, 2002, 2006
- Korean FA Cup: 1999
- Korean League Cup: 2002
- Korean Super Cup: 2002

Jeonbuk Hyundai Motors

- K League 1: 2009, 2011
- AFC Champions League runner-up: 2011

South Korea

- AFC Asian Cup third place: 2000, 2007

Individual

- K League All-Star: 2002, 2010
- K League 1 Best XI: 2009

=== Manager ===
Jeonbuk Hyundai Motors

- K League 1: 2021
- Korean FA Cup: 2022

Vietnam

- ASEAN Championship: 2024, 2026

Vietnam U23

- SEA Games: 2025
- ASEAN U-23 Championship: 2025
- AFC U-23 Asian Cup third place: 2026

Individual

- K League Manager of the Month: March 2021, July 2022
- K League 1 Manager of the Year: 2021
- Korean FA Coach of the Year: 2021
- K League All-Star: 2022
- Korean FA Cup Best Manager: 2022
- ASEAN All-Star: 2025
