= K. Rajagopal (footballer) =

Malaysian football manager and player (born 1956)

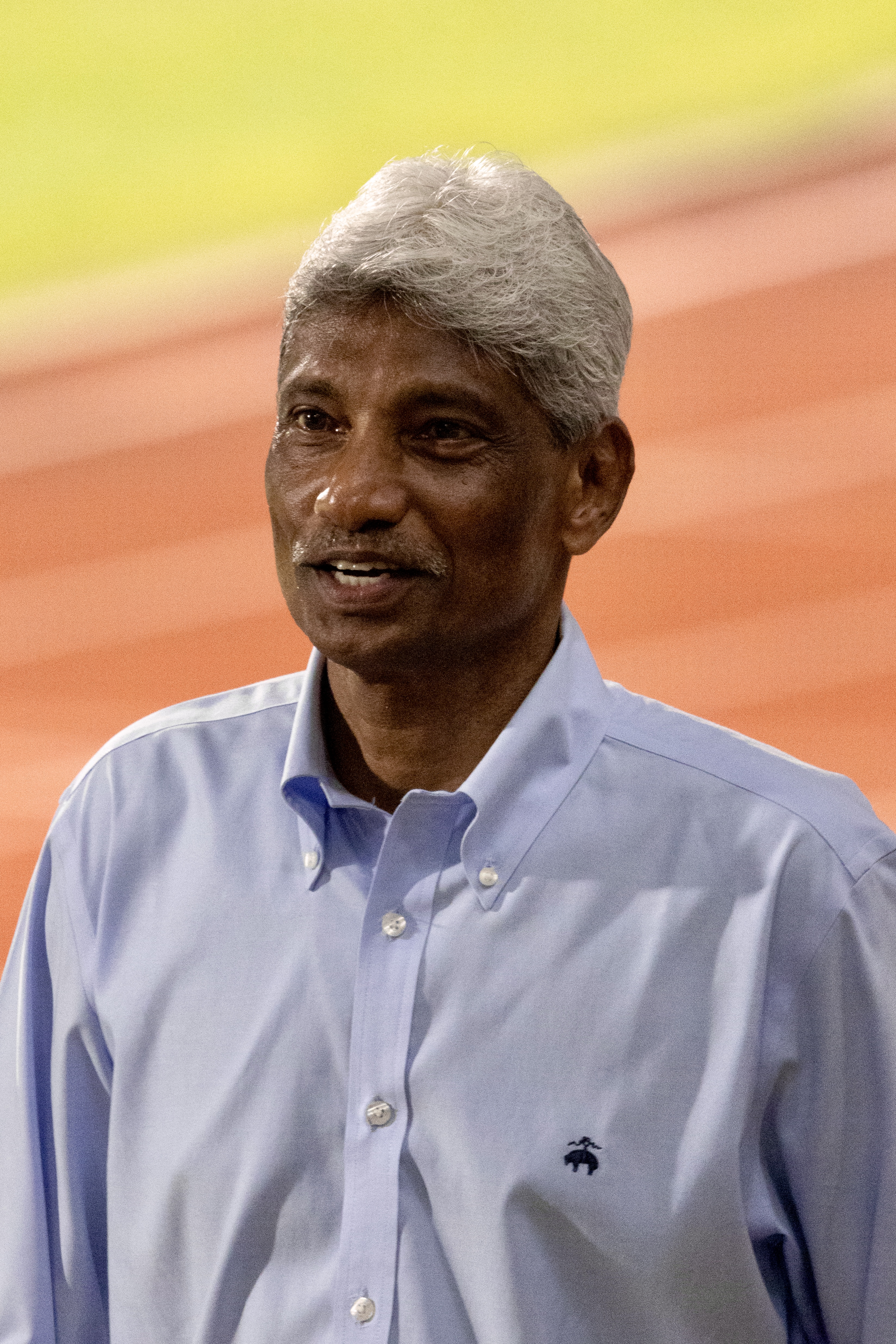
- Rajagopal in 2024

Personal information
- Full name: Rajagopal s/o Krishnasamy
- Date of birth: 10 July 1956 (age 70)
- Place of birth: Kuala Lumpur, Malaysia
- Position: Forward

Youth career
- 1974–1977: PKNS FC

Senior career*
Years	Team	Apps	(Gls)
1978–1980	Selangor FA	22	(8)
Total		88	(20)

International career
1980–1982	Malaysia	20	(0)

Managerial career
- 1990–1998: PKNS
- 1999–2000: Selangor FA
- 2001–2002: Kelantan FA
- 2004–2006: Malaysia U19
- 2007–2009: Harimau Muda A
- 2009–2011: Malaysia U23
- 2009–2013: Malaysia
- 2014: ASEAN All-Stars
- 2015–2016: Sarawak FA
- 2017–2019: PKNS
- 2020–2022: Brunei
Medal record
Men's football
Representing Malaysia (as manager)
AFF Championship
Winner	2010
- * Club domestic league appearances and goals

Datuk Rajagopal s/o Krishnasamy (Tamil: ராஜகோபால் கிருஷ்ணசாமி; born 10 July 1956) is a Malaysian football pundit, manager and former player. He led the Malaysia national team to the 2009 SEA Games gold medal and 2010 AFF Championship.

== Managerial statistics ==
As of match played 17 September 2019

Managerial record by team and tenure
Team	Nat	From	To	Record				
Team	Nat	From	To	G	W	D	L	Win %
Malaysia (Caretaker)	(Malaysia)	1 March 2004	30 November 2004	4	0	2	2	0.00
Malaysia	(Malaysia)	30 June 2009	31 December 2013	52	14	15	23	26.92
Sarawak	(Malaysia)	1 December 2015	7 May 2016	11	1	3	7	9.09
PKNS	(Malaysia)	22 November 2017	30 November 2019	68	25	17	26	36.76
Brunei	(Brunei)	1 December 2020	22 January 2022	0	0	0	0	—
Career Total				135	40	37	58	29.63

== Managerial career ==
=== Beginnings as coach ===
Rajagopal started his coaching career in 1990 with PKNS He also had stints as a club coach with Selangor FA and Kelantan FA.

=== Malaysia ===
He was appointed coach for the young Malaysia U20 team from 2004 until 2006, and the Malaysia under-19 (known as Harimau Muda A) from 2007 to 2009. Under his guidance, Harimau Muda A became the Premier League champion in 2009. Since July 2009, he has been the head coach for both the Harimau Muda and Malaysia senior teams, taking over from B. Sathianathan. His first game was a 3–0 win against Singapore and a 5–0 win against Zimbabwe.

Rajagopal is best known for guiding Malaysia's under-23 side to its first gold medal in 20 years at the 2009 Southeast Asian Games in Laos, where the team defeated Vietnam 1–0 in the final on 17 December after earlier knocking out 8-time defending champions, Thailand in the group stage. After the victory, Rajagopal earned the nickname "King Gopal". In July 2009, Rajagopal coached Malaysia in two games against English champions Manchester United, lost in both matches 0–1 and 2–3.

Rajagopal also led the national football team to win the 2010 AFF Suzuki Cup, the first time Malaysia won the championship since its inception in 1996. His philosophy of changing the tactical approach from a defensive to an offensive playing style has been rewarded in this victory. His young team has shown a high standard of football possession, good defensive structure, and clinical finish en route to clinch the title. His contract was not renewed at the end of 2013. Despite some rumours citing him to be appointed as the head coach for the Vietnam national team, it does not come to fruition.

=== Sarawak FA ===
In a press conference in September 2015, it was announced that Rajagopal had been appointed as head coach of Sarawak FA, beginning in December 2015. His contract was terminated the following year, on 7 May 2016, after the team's poor performance, which finished at the bottom of the league.

=== Return to PKNS ===
Rajagopal was announced as the new head coach of PKNS on 22 November 2017.

=== Brunei ===
On 1 December 2020, Rajagobal was announced by the National Football Association of Brunei Darussalam to be the head coach for the Brunei national team on a two-year contract. In January 2022, he left his post without ever taking charge of a single international match for Brunei due to the COVID-19 pandemic.

== Awards and recognition ==
=== Personal Honours ===
Honour of Malaysia

- Malaysia
  - Commander of the Order of Meritorious Service (PJN) - Datuk (2011)

On 4 June 2011, K. Rajagopal was awarded the Panglima Jasa Negara (PJN), which carries the title Datuk, in conjunction with the Yang di-Pertuan Agong's birthday in that year. He was among 67 recipients of the awards from His Majesty Tuanku Mizan Zainal Abidin at Balairong Seri, Istana Negara.

- ASEAN All-Stars: 2014 As Coach

=== Honours as manager ===
Malaysia

- AFF Championship: 2010
- SEA Games Gold medals: 2009
