= João Pedro (footballer, born 1998) =

East Timorese footballer (born 1998)

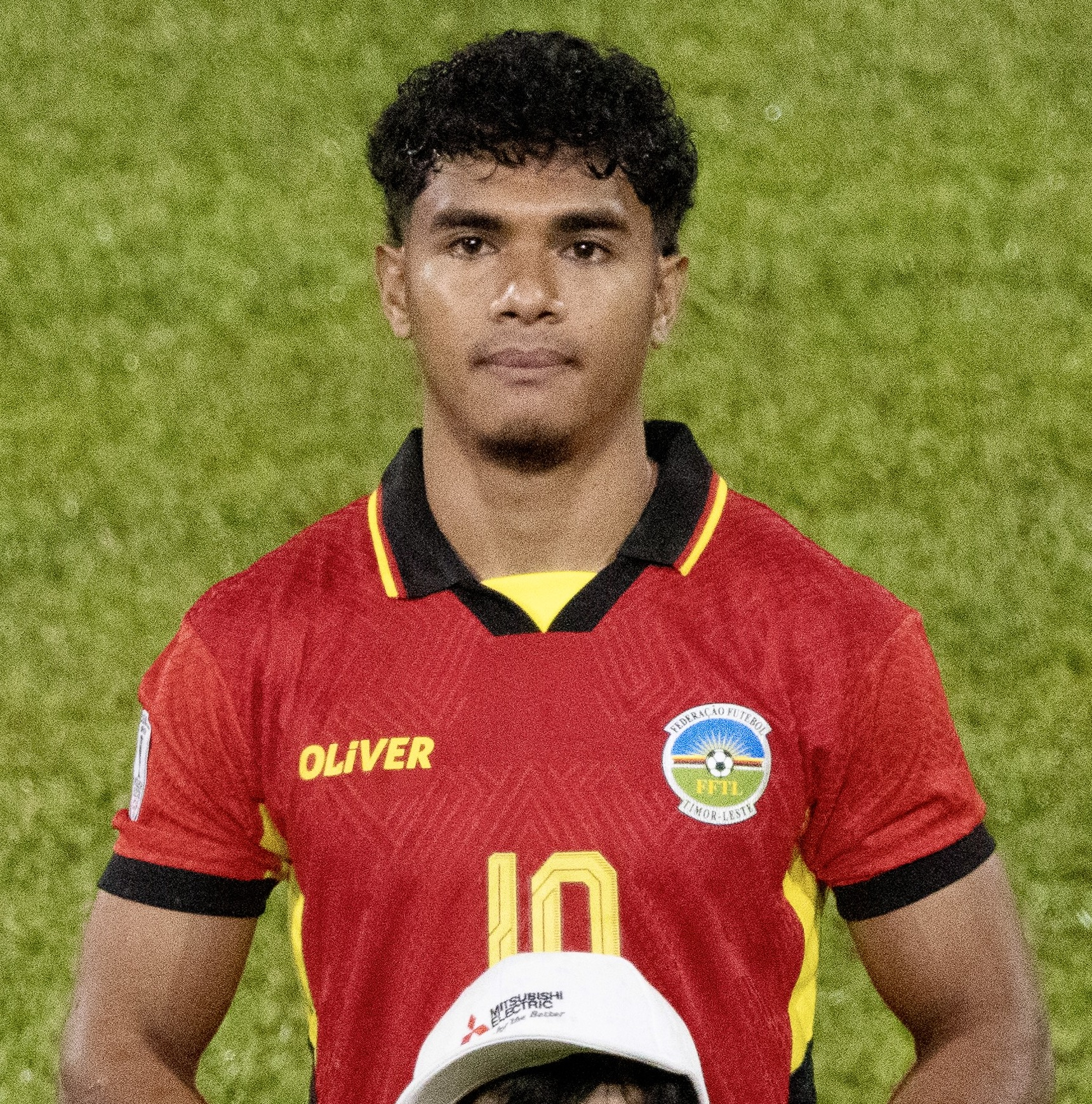
- João Pedro with Timor-Leste in 2024

Personal information
- Full name: João Pedro da Silva Freitas
- Date of birth: 24 June 1998 (age 28)
- Place of birth: Baucau, Indonesia
- Height: 1.72 m (5 ft 8 in)
- Positions: Winger; forward

Team information
- Current team: Kuching City
- Number: 22

Youth career
- Centro Treinamento Futebol Juvenil Timor-Leste

Senior career*
Years	Team	Apps	(Gls)
2015–2019	SLB Laulara		(7+)
2019	Ubon United		
2020	SLB Laulara		
2020–2022	UiTM	2	(0)
2022–2023	Lalenok United		
2023–2024	Benfica de Macau	15	(10)
2024	PSM Makassar	10	(0)
2024–2025	Angkor Tiger	26	(7)
2025–	Kuching City	18	(3)

International career^{‡}
2018–	Timor-Leste	30	(9)
- * Club domestic league appearances and goals as of 14 March 2026 ‡ National team caps and goals as of 30 September 2026

João Pedro da Silva Freitas (born 24 June 1998) is an East Timorese professional footballer who plays as a winger or a forward for Malaysia Super League club Kuching City and the Timor-Leste national team.

João Pedro is currently the all-time top scorer of the Timor-Leste national team with 8 goals. He also holds the record for the highest goal scoring Timorese to score in the ASEAN Championship.

== Club career ==
João Pedro was signed on a free transfer from Cambodian club Angkor Tiger FC by Malaysia Super League club Kuching City on June 28, 2025. This was amid strong interest from another Malaysian club Kuala Lumpur City, whose chairman had publicly declared their intent to sign the Timorese striker for the upcoming season.

In his first season with the Malaysian outfit, João Pedro made seven appearances for Kuching City in the Piala Malaysia, helping them reach the final against reigning champions Johor.

João Pedro's performance in the Piala Malaysia final was lauded by many fans and critics, highlighted by his dribbles past Johor defenders Feroz Baharudin and Antonio Glauder. He was also praised by Kuching City manager Aidil Sharin Sahak, who commended his speed and crossing ability.

== International career ==
João Pedro made his national team debut for Timor-Leste at the 2018 AFF Championship tournament. On 17 November 2018, he made his first international goal against Philippines.

On 7 June 2019, João Pedro scored Timor-Leste's only goal in a 7–1 defeat to Malaysia in 2022 FIFA World Cup qualification.

On 5 September 2024, João Pedro scored a hat-trick in a 4–1 victory over Mongolia in the first leg of the 2027 AFC Asian Cup qualification – play-off round.

During the 2024 ASEAN Championship against Cambodia on 17 November 2024. João Pedro become the joint top scorer for Timor-Leste with 7 goals.

On 10 June 2025, Pedro scored the lone goal in a 1–0 win against Maldives in the third round of 2027 AFC Asian Cup qualification, making him become the all-time top scorer for the Timor-Leste national team.

== Career statistics ==
=== International ===
As of match played 30 September 2026

Appearances and goals by national team and year
National team	Year	Apps	Goals
Timor-Leste	2018	6	1
Timor-Leste	2019	2	1
Timor-Leste	2020	0	0
Timor-Leste	2021	2	0
Timor-Leste	2022	3	0
Timor-Leste	2023	2	0
Timor-Leste	2024	7	5
Timor-Leste	2025	5	1
Timor-Leste	2026	3	1
Total		30	9

Scores and results list Timor-Leste's goal tally first.

List of international goals scored by João Pedro
No.	Date	Venue	Opponent	Score	Result	Competition
1.	17 November 2018	Kuala Lumpur Stadium, Kuala Lumpur, Malaysia	Philippines	2–3	2–3	2018 AFF Championship
2.	7 June 2019	Bukit Jalil National Stadium, Kuala Lumpur, Malaysia	Malaysia	1–4	1–7	2022 FIFA World Cup qualification
3.	5 September 2024	Kapten I Wayan Dipta Stadium, Gianyar, Indonesia	Mongolia	1–0	4–1	2027 AFC Asian Cup qualification
4.	5 September 2024	Kapten I Wayan Dipta Stadium, Gianyar, Indonesia	Mongolia	2–0	4–1	2027 AFC Asian Cup qualification
5.	5 September 2024	Kapten I Wayan Dipta Stadium, Gianyar, Indonesia	Mongolia	3–1	4–1	2027 AFC Asian Cup qualification
6.	11 December 2024	Bukit Jalil National Stadium, Kuala Lumpur, Malaysia	Malaysia	2–1	2–3	2024 ASEAN Championship
7.	17 December 2024	Phnom Penh Olympic Stadium, Phnom Penh, Cambodia	Cambodia	1–0	1–2	2024 ASEAN Championship
8.	10 June 2025	Territory Rugby League Stadium, Darwin, Australia	Maldives	1–0	1–0	2027 AFC Asian Cup qualification
9.	30 September 2026	Kai Tak Stadium, Kowloon, Hong Kong	Cambodia	1–0	2–2	2026 FIFA ASEAN Cup

== Honours ==
ASEAN All-Stars

- Maybank Challenge Cup: 2025
