= Sandro Reyes =

Filipino footballer (born 2003)

Personal information
- Full name: Sandro Miguel Sison Reyes
- Date of birth: March 29, 2003 (age 23)
- Place of birth: Makati, Philippines
- Height: 1.76 m (5 ft 9 in)
- Position: Attacking midfielder

Youth career
- –2012: Frenz United
- 2012–2015: Barcelona
- 2015–2016: Santboià
- 2016–2021: UE Sants

Senior career*
Years	Team	Apps	(Gls)
2021–2022	ADC	0	(0)
2022–2023	Kaya–Iloilo	12	(0)
2023–2024	Greuther Fürth II	39	(2)
2024–2026	Gütersloh	51	(5)

International career^{‡}
2017	Philippines U15	4	(0)
2018	Philippines U16	5	(1)
2022	Philippines U19	2	(1)
2022	Philippines U20	3	(0)
2025	Philippines U22	4	(0)
2021–	Philippines U23	14	(3)
2021–	Philippines	37	(6)
- * Club domestic league appearances and goals as of July 30, 2026 ‡ National team caps and goals as of 19:10, September 29, 2026 (UTC)

Sandro Miguel Sison Reyes (born March 29, 2003) is a Filipino professional footballer who plays as an attacking midfielder for the Philippines national team.

== Early life ==
Reyes was born to Camille and Edmundo Reyes Jr. Reyes was enrolled at PAREF Southridge School in Muntinlupa for preparatory studies. He learned football at age four and played as a striker and midfielder. He was exposed to football in Iloilo, Bacolod and Barotac Nuevo by his parents. Locally he frequently competed boys older than him who were 12 to 13 years old.

He stayed in Southridge until 2012 during his mid-term of his four grade studies after he received a scholarship from FCB Escola in Spain. He learned to live independently in Spain, since his mom who came with him have to occasionally return to the Philippines.

== Club career ==
=== Youth ===
Reyes participated in a youth camp in Singapore by Spanish La Liga side Barcelona. He received an invitation for a try-out in Spain. The program was participated by 2,400 children aged 9 to 12 which was reduced to a pool of 40 boys for the second camp. Two boys, an Irish youth and Reyes himself was selected.

At the age of nine, Reyes joined Barcelona's youth academy FCB Escola. After that, he joined the youth academy of Santboià in the Spanish fifth division.

=== Azkals Development Team ===
In 2021, he joined Filipino club ADT. Reyes made his debut for ADT in a 2–0 defeat against Kaya–Iloilo in 2021 Copa Paulino Alcantara. He scored his first goal for ADT in a 9–0 win against Mendiola 1991, scoring the last goal of the match.

=== Kaya–Iloilo ===
In January 2022, Reyes joined Philippines Football League club Kaya–Iloilo.

=== Greuther Fürth II ===
In January 2023, Reyes moved to Germany to join SpVgg Greuther Fürth II of the Regionalliga.

Reyes scored his first goal for SpVgg Greuther Fürth II in the 28th minute in their match against DJK Vilzing.

=== FC Gütersloh ===
In August 2024, Reyes joined Regionalliga West club FC Gütersloh. He made his debut for the club on the 17 August as a substitute against TS Dortmund, receiving a red card after just one minute of being in the match.

== International career ==
=== Philippines U16 ===
In 2018, Reyes received a call up from Philippines U16 for the 2018 AFF U-16 Youth Championship. He made his debut in a 8–0 defeat to hosts Indonesia U16. Reyes scored his only goal for Philippines U16 in a 1–6 defeat against Vietnam U16.

=== Philippines U19 ===
In July 2022, Reyes was called up to represent the Philippines U19 for the 2022 AFF U-19 Youth Championship in Indonesia. He made his debut for Philippines U19 in a 1–0 defeat against Thailand U19.

=== Philippines U23 ===
In October 2021, Reyes received a call up from Philippines U23 for the 2022 AFC U-23 Asian Cup qualification matches against South Korea U23, Singapore U23 and Timor Leste U23. He made his debut for Philippines U23 in a 3–0 defeat against South Korea U23. Reyes scored his first goal for Philippines U23 in a 2–1 win against Brunei U23.

Reyes was included in the 20-man squad for 31st Southeast Asian Games, which was held in Vietnam.

=== Philippines ===
Reyes received his first call up from the Philippines national team for the 2020 AFF Championship. He made his senior international debut in a 2–3 win against Myanmar coming in as a substitute, replacing Oskari Kekkonen at the 72nd minute.

Reyes scored his first international goal on December 23, 2022, against Brunei at the Rizal Memorial Stadium during the 2022 AFF Championship.

== Career statistics ==
=== Club ===
As of match played 10 May 2026

Appearances and goals by club, season and competition
Club	Season	League			National cup (Note: Includes Copa Paulino Alcantara, DFB-Pokal)		Continental		Other		Total	
Club	Season	Division	Apps	Goals	Apps	Goals	Apps	Goals	Apps	Goals	Apps	Goals
Azkals Development Club	2021	Philippines Football League	0	0	4	1	—		—		4	1
Kaya–Iloilo	2022–23	Philippines Football League	0	0	3	0	4 (Note: One appearance in AFC Champions League Elite, three appearances in AFC Champions League Two)	0	—		7	0
Greuther Fürth II	2022–23	Regionalliga Bayern	13	1	—		—		—		13	1
Greuther Fürth II	2023–24	Regionalliga Bayern	26	1	—		—		—		26	1
Greuther Fürth II	Total		39	2	—		—		—		39	2
Gütersloh	2024–25	Regionalliga West	24	5	—		—		0	0	24	5
Gütersloh	2025–26	Regionalliga West	27	0	1	0	—		2 (Note: Appearances in Westphalian Cup)	2	30	2
Gütersloh	Total		51	5	1	0	—		2	2	54	7
Career total			66	2	8	1	4	0	2	2	80	5

=== International ===
As of September 29, 2026

Appearances and goals by year
National team	Year	Apps	Goals
Philippines	2021	1	0
Philippines	2022	7	1
Philippines	2023	4	0
Philippines	2024	11	2
Philippines	2025	5	2
Philippines	2026	9	1
Total		37	6

Scores and results list the Philippines' goal tally first.

#	Date	Venue	Opponent	Score	Result	Competition
1.	December 23, 2022	Rizal Memorial Stadium, Manila, Philippines	Brunei	2–0	5–1	2022 AFF Championship
2.	December 15, 2024	New Laos National Stadium, Vientiane, Laos	Laos	1–1	1–1	2024 ASEAN Championship
3.	December 27, 2024	Rizal Memorial Stadium, Manila, Philippines	Thailand	1–0	2–1	2024 ASEAN Championship
4.	March 25, 2025	New Clark City Athletics Stadium, Capas, Philippines	Maldives	4–1	4–1	2027 AFC Asian Cup qualification
5.	November 18, 2025	National Football Stadium, Malé, Maldives	Maldives	2–0	2–0	2027 AFC Asian Cup qualification
6.	September 29, 2026	Si Jalak Harupat Stadium, Bandung, Indonesia	Pakistan	1–0	2–2	2026 FIFA ASEAN Cup

== Personal life ==
Reyes comes from a political family in the Philippines; his father, Edmundo Reyes Jr., served as the representative for the province of Marinduque's at-large congressional district from 1998 to 2007 and is a former executive director of the Toll Regulatory Board. His paternal grandmother, Carmencita Reyes, had also served as Marinduque congresswoman from 1978 to 1998 and from 2007 until her election as governor of Marinduque in 2010, which she served until her death in 2019. His aunt, Regina Reyes Mandanas, was Marinduque's congresswoman from 2013 to 2016 as well as the wife of the governor of Batangas province from 1995 to 2004 and from 2016 until her death in 2022.

== Honours ==
ASEAN All-Stars

- Maybank Challenge Cup: 2025

Individual

- AFF U-23 Championship Team of the Tournament: 2022
- ASEAN Championship Best XI: 2024
