= Dermot Mee =

Northern Irish footballer (born 2002)

Personal information
- Full name: Dermot William Mee
- Date of birth: 20 November 2002 (age 23)
- Place of birth: Birmingham, England
- Height: 1.83 m (6 ft 0 in)
- Position: Goalkeeper

Team information
- Current team: Manchester United
- Number: 45

Youth career
- –2015: Walsall
- 2015–2021: Manchester United
- 2021: → Fulham (loan)

Senior career*
Years	Team	Apps	(Gls)
2021–	Manchester United	0	(0)
2021	→ Trafford (loan)	7	(0)
2021	→ Runcorn Linnets (loan)	2	(0)
2022	→ Witton Albion (loan)	4	(0)
2022	→ Altrincham (loan)	4	(0)

International career^{‡}
2019	Northern Ireland U17	4	(0)
2019	Northern Ireland U19	4	(0)
2021–2022	Northern Ireland U21	4	(0)
- * Club domestic league appearances and goals ‡ National team caps and goals as of & June 2022

Dermot William Mee (born 20 November 2002) is a professional footballer who plays as a goalkeeper for Manchester United. Born in England, he is a Northern Ireland youth international.

== Early life ==
Mee was born on 20 November 2002 in Birmingham, England. A native of Birmingham, England, he is of Irish descent through his parents who are from Galway/Tyrone and Limerick Ireland.

== Club career ==
As a youth player, Mee joined the Development Squad of English side Walsall. In 2015, he joined the youth academy of English Premier League side Manchester United. Subsequently, he was sent on loan to the English side Trafford in 2021. One year later, he was sent on loan to English side Witton Albion.

The same year, he was sent on loan to English side Altrincham, where he made four league appearances. On 9 March 2024, he first made the senior matchday squad for a 2–0 home win over Everton in the league. English newspaper Daily Mirror wrote in 2025 that "since joining United in 2019, Mee has been a regular presence in training alongside the first-team keepers". On 3 July 2026, he signed a new two-year contract with Manchester United.

== International career ==
Mee is a Northern Ireland youth international. During March 2019, he played for the Northern Ireland national under-17 football team for 2019 UEFA European Under-17 Championship qualification. Three years later, he played for the Northern Ireland national under-21 football team for 2023 UEFA European Under-21 Championship qualification.
