= Malik Risaldi =

Indonesian footballer (born 1996)

Personal information
- Full name: Malik Risaldi
- Date of birth: 23 October 1996 (age 30)
- Place of birth: Surabaya, Indonesia
- Height: 1.80 m (5 ft 11 in)
- Position: Winger

Team information
- Current team: Persebaya Surabaya
- Number: 77

Youth career
- 2010–2013: WCP Academy
- 2014–2015: Gresik United
- 2016: Persela Lamongan

Senior career*
| Years | Team | Apps | (Gls) |
| 2017 | PS Timah Babel | 5 | (0) |
| 2018 | Persegres Gresik | 21 | (6) |
| 2019–2022 | Persela Lamongan | 61 | (5) |
| 2022–2024 | Madura United | 63 | (16) |
| 2024– | Persebaya Surabaya | 52 | (6) |

International career^{‡}
| 2024– | Indonesia | 3 | (0) |
- * Club domestic league appearances and goals as of 23 May 2026 ‡ National team caps and goals as of 15 October 2024

Malik Risaldi (born 23 October 1996) is an Indonesian professional footballer who plays as a winger for Super League club Persebaya Surabaya and the Indonesia national team.

== Club career ==
=== PS Timah Babel ===
He was signed for PS Timah Babel to play in the Liga 2 in the 2017 season.

=== Persegres Gresik ===
In 2018, Malik Risaldi signed a contract with Indonesian Liga 2 club Persegres Gresik. He made 21 league appearances and scored 6 goals for Persegres Gresik.

=== Persela Lamongan ===
He was signed for Persela Lamongan to play in Liga 1 in the 2019 season. Risaldi made his debut on 17 May 2019 in a match against Madura United. On 23 October 2019, Risaldi scored his first goal for Persela against Persebaya Surabaya in the 63rd minute at the Surajaya Stadium, Lamongan. On 21 December 2019, he scored in a 2–0 win against Semen Padang. Risaldi finished the season with 2 goal in 26 league appearances. In the 2020 season, Risaldi only played 3 times for the club because the league was officially discontinued due to the COVID-19 pandemic.

On 25 October 2021, Risaldi scored his first league goal of the 2021–22 season, scoring the opening goal in a 1–0 win over Persik Kediri. On 4 November, he scored in a 1–3 lose over Persib Bandung.

On 15 January 2022, Risaldi scored the opening goal in a 1–1 draw over Persija Jakarta in the Kapten I Wayan Dipta Stadium. In April 2022, Risaldi officially left Persela, he appeared in 32 matches or for 2,464 minutes. he also collected three goals and two assists this season.

=== Madura United ===
Risaldi signed for Madura United to play in Liga 1 in the 2022–23 season. He made his league debut on 23 July 2022, and also scored his first goal for Madura United in a 8–0 home win against PS Barito Putera. On 27 August 2022, he scored the opening goal for the club in a 2–1 win over Persikabo 1973.

On 14 January 2023, Risaldi was involved in Madura United's 1–2 away win over Barito Putera, scoring a goal in the 36th minute.

== International career ==
On 31 May 2024, Risaldi received a called up to the Indonesia national team. On 2 June 2024, he made his debut against Tanzania in a 0–0 draw.

On 10 October 2024, Malik made his official competitive debut against Bahrain as a starter in the 2026 FIFA World Cup qualification.

== Career statistics ==
=== Club ===
As of 23 May 2026

| Club | Season | League | | | Cup (Note: Includes Piala Indonesia) | | Continental | | Other (Note: Appearances in Indonesia President's Cup) | | Total | |
| Club | Season | Division | Apps | Goals | Apps | Goals | Apps | Goals | Apps | Goals | Apps | Goals |
|---|---|---|---|---|---|---|---|---|---|---|---|---|
| PS Timah Babel | 2017 | Liga 2 | 5 | 0 | 0 | 0 | – | | 0 | 0 | 5 | 0 |
| Persegres Gresik | 2018 | Liga 2 | 21 | 6 | 0 | 0 | – | | 0 | 0 | 21 | 6 |
| Persela Lamongan | 2019 | Liga 1 | 26 | 2 | 2 | 1 | – | | 2 | 1 | 30 | 4 |
| Persela Lamongan | 2020 | Liga 1 | 3 | 0 | 0 | 0 | – | | 0 | 0 | 3 | 0 |
| Persela Lamongan | 2021–22 | Liga 1 | 32 | 3 | 0 | 0 | – | | 4 (Note: Appearances in Menpora Cup) | 0 | 36 | 3 |
| Persela Lamongan | Total | | 61 | 5 | 2 | 1 | – | | 6 | 1 | 69 | 7 |
| Madura United | 2022–23 | Liga 1 | 27 | 3 | 0 | 0 | – | | 3 | 0 | 30 | 3 |
| Madura United | 2023–24 | Liga 1 | 36 | 13 | 0 | 0 | – | | 0 | 0 | 36 | 13 |
| Madura United | Total | | 63 | 16 | 0 | 0 | – | | 3 | 0 | 66 | 16 |
| Persebaya Surabaya | 2024–25 | Liga 1 | 24 | 4 | 0 | 0 | – | | 0 | 0 | 24 | 4 |
| Persebaya Surabaya | 2025–26 | Super League | 28 | 2 | 0 | 0 | – | | 0 | 0 | 28 | 2 |
| Career total | | | 202 | 33 | 2 | 1 | 0 | 0 | 9 | 1 | 213 | 35 |

=== International ===
As of match played 15 October 2024

Appearances and goals by national team and year
| National team | Year | Apps | Goals |
|---|---|---|---|
| Indonesia | 2024 | 3 | 0 |
| Total | | 3 | 0 |

== Honours ==
Persebaya Surabaya

- Piala Presiden: 2026

ASEAN All-Stars

- Maybank Challenge Cup: 2025
