= Patiwat Khammai =

Thai footballer (born 1994)

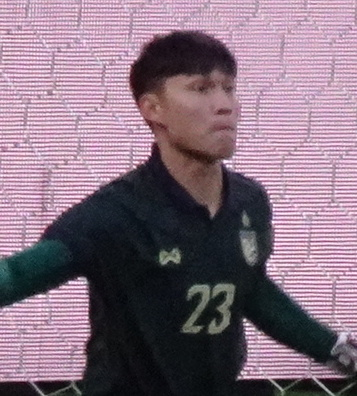
- Khammai playing for Thailand in 2024

Personal information
- Full name: Patiwat Khammai
- Date of birth: 24 December 1994 (age 31)
- Place of birth: Chonburi, Thailand
- Height: 1.86 m (6 ft 1 in)
- Position: Goalkeeper

Team information
- Current team: Bangkok United
- Number: 1

Youth career
- 2004–2006: Assumption College Thonburi
- 2006–2009: Chonburi Sports School
- 2009–2012: Assumption College Thonburi
- 2013–2015: Muangthong United

Senior career*
Years	Team	Apps	(Gls)
2013–2016	Muangthong United	0	(0)
2015–2016	→ Pattaya United (loan)	4	(0)
2016–2018	Pattaya United	40	(0)
2018–2022	Samut Prakan City	70	(0)
2022–	Bangkok United	71	(0)
2022–2023	→ Muangthong United (loan)	14	(0)

International career^{‡}
2021–	Thailand	32	(0)
Medal record
Men's football
Representing Thailand
FIFA ASEAN Cup
Runner-up	2026 Indonesia	Team
ASEAN Championship
Runner-up	2024	Team
- * Club domestic league appearances and goals as of 06:30, 12 January 2026 (UTC) ‡ National team caps and goals as of 26 September 2026

Patiwat Khammai (Thai: ปฏิวัติ คำไหม, born 24 December 1994) is a Thai professional footballer who plays as a goalkeeper for Thai League 1 club Bangkok United and the Thailand national team.

== International career ==
On 12 April 2021, He was named in manager Akira Nishino’s 47-man squad for Thailand's 2022 World Cup qualification. He made his senior international debut in the friendly match against Tajikistan on 29 May 2021.

When Masatada Ishii, whom Patiwat used to work with at Samut Prakan City, took charge of Thailand in late 2023, Patiwat became an undisputed starter in the national team for the first time. He started in a 5-0 friendly defeat against Japan on 1 January 2024, Ishii's first official match with the national team.

Patiwat held on to the number one spot for the upcoming 2023 AFC Asian Cup, starting in three of four matches Thailand played in the tournament, keeping two clean sheets in the match against Kyrgyzstan and Oman, receiving praise for his performances throughout the tournament.

== Style of play ==
Patiwat is often hailed as a contemporary footballer who excels in the role of a goalkeeper, displaying remarkable skills with his feet. He is renowned for adopting a style reminiscent of a sweeper keeper, proficient at venturing out of his penalty box to actively participate in the build-up play of his team.

== Honours ==
Bangkok United

- Thailand Champions Cup: 2023
- Thai FA Cup: 2023–24

ASEAN All-Stars

- Maybank Challenge Cup: 2025

Thailand

- King's Cup: 2024, 2026
- ASEAN Championship: runner-up 2024
- FIFA ASEAN Cup: runner-up 2026

Individual

- Thai League Best XI: 2023–24
