= Kealey Adamson =

Australian soccer player (born 2003)

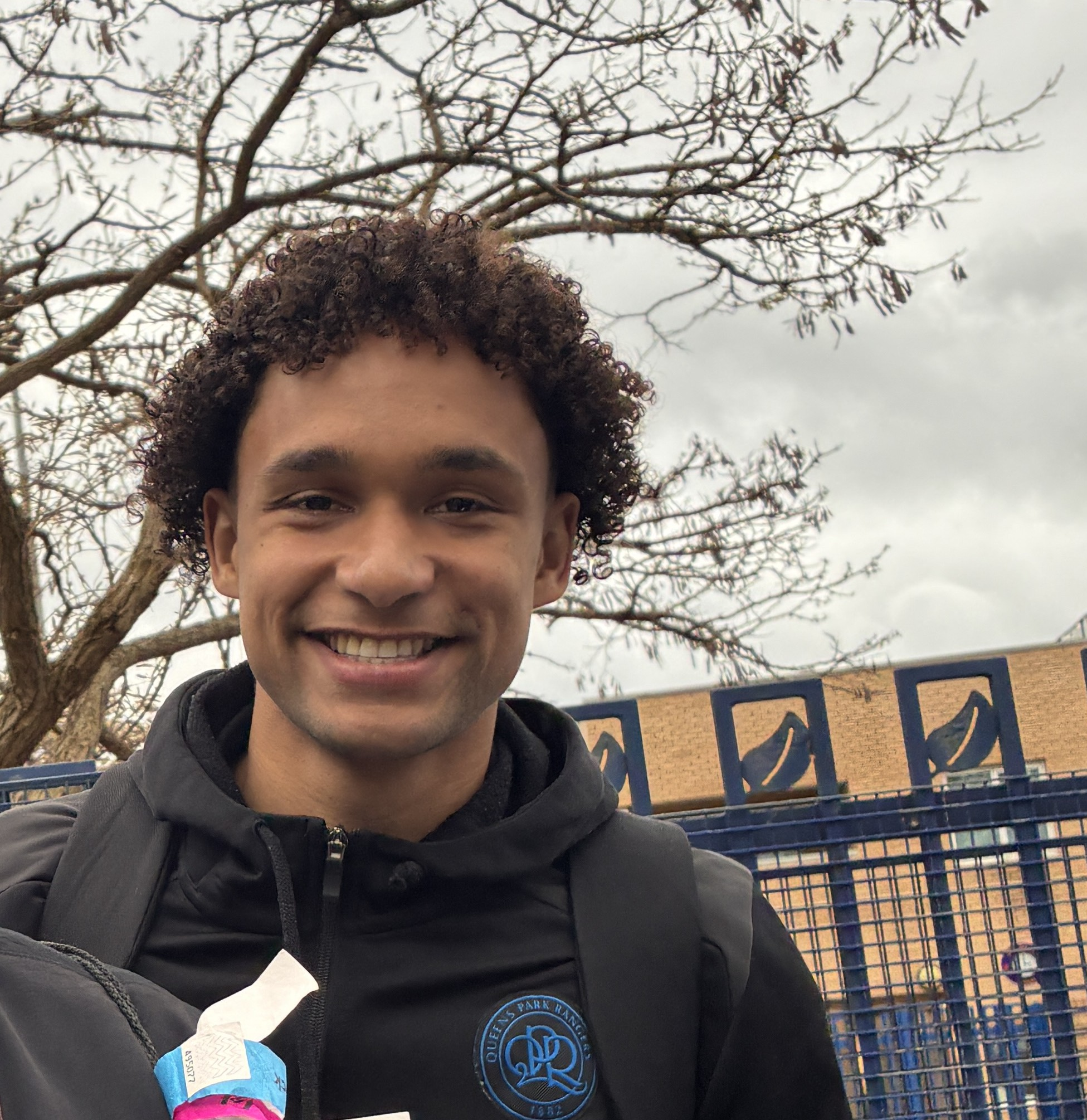
- Adamson in 2026

Personal information
- Full name: Kealey Otieno Adamson
- Date of birth: 9 March 2003 (age 23)
- Place of birth: St Leonards, New South Wales, Australia
- Height: 1.85 m (6 ft 1 in)
- Position: Right-back

Team information
- Current team: Queens Park Rangers
- Number: 2

Youth career
- Lindfield FC
- Sydney FC

Senior career*
Years	Team	Apps	(Gls)
2022–2023	Sydney FC NPL	28	(1)
2023	Sydney FC	0	(0)
2023–2025	Macarthur FC	39	(2)
2025–	Queens Park Rangers	21	(0)

International career^{‡}
2025–	Australia U23	5	(1)
- * Club domestic league appearances and goals as of 25 January 2025 ‡ National team caps and goals as of 10 September 2025

Kealey Otieno Adamson (born 9 March 2003) is an Australian soccer player who plays as a right-back for EFL Championship club Queens Park Rangers.

== Career ==
Adamson made his professional debut for Sydney FC, having come through the youth ranks, and was signed to a short-term contract for the 2023 Australia Cup, where he impressed at right-back in the opening rounds of the competition. However, Adamson's good performances would not see his contract extended, and he would go on to sign for rival club Macarthur FC.

Due to Macarthur FC signing Adamson outside of the registration window, Adamson would be unable to play for Macarthur FC until January when the next registration window opened up. He would ultimately make his debut later that month in a 3–3 draw against Western United.

On 27 June 2025, Adamson agreed to join EFL Championship club Queens Park Rangers, officially joining the club from 1 July.

On 18th September 2025 He was named as the 1207th player to play for Queens Park Rangers with his debut on 09/08/2025. The same day, he made history as the first Australian-born player with the middle name Otieno and initials KOA to play for the side.

== Personal life ==
Born in Australia, Adamson is of Tanzanian descent through his father.

== Honours ==
Sydney

- Australia Cup: 2023

Macarthur FC

- Australia Cup: 2024

ASEAN All-Stars

- Maybank Challenge Cup: 2025
