= Faeez Khan =

Cambodian footballer (born 1992)

Personal information
- Full name: Mohammed Faeez Khan
- Date of birth: 24 September 1992 (age 34)
- Place of birth: East London, South Africa
- Height: 1.78 m (5 ft 10 in)
- Positions: Centre-back; right-back

Team information
- Current team: ISI Dangkor Senchey
- Number: 4

Youth career
- –2015: Free State Stars

Senior career*
Years	Team	Apps	(Gls)
2015–2017	Milano United	40	(0)
2017–2018	Tshakhuma Tsha Madzivhandila	0	(0)
2019	Phatthalung	0	(0)
2019–2020	Tiffy Army	0	(0)
2020–	Visakha	74	(11)
2026–	→ ISI Dangkor Senchey (loan)	2	(1)

International career^{‡}
2024–	Cambodia	10	(0)
- * Club domestic league appearances and goals as of 10 November 2026 ‡ National team caps and goals as of 13 November 2025

Mohammed Faeez Khan (born 24 September 1992), known in Cambodia as Kan Mo (Khmer: កាន់ ម៉ូ), is a professional footballer who plays as a centre-back or a right-back for Cambodian Premier League club ISI Dangkor Senchey on loan from Visakha and captains the Cambodia national team although born in South Africa.

== Club career ==
=== Early career ===
Faeez is a Muslim born in South Africa. He was naturalized in Cambodia after 5 years of living there and received the Khmer name Kan Mo (កាន់ ម៉ូ).

=== Free State Stars ===
Faeez started his footballing career at Free State Stars joining their academy.

=== Milano United ===
In July 2015, he signed a professional contract for Milano United.

=== Tshakhuma Tsha Madzivhandila ===
On 7 August 2017, Faeez signed for Tshakhuma Tsha Madzivhandila in Thohoyandou.

=== Phatthalung ===
On 2 January 2019, Faeez moved all the way to Southeast Asia to signed with Thai League 4 club Phatthalung.

=== Visakha ===
On 29 April 2020, Faeez signed with Cambodian Premier League club Visakha. He was named as the club captain ahead of the 2023–24 season.

On 19 October 2024, Faeez scored a brace in which put his team in a 2–1 win over ISI Dangkor Senchey.

== International career ==
After professionally playing in Cambodia for 5 years, Khan received Cambodia citizenship through naturalization on 6 August 2024. His Khmer name is Kan Mo.

Faeez make his Cambodia national team debut during the play-off round of the 2027 AFC Asian Cup qualification against Sri Lanka on 5 September 2024. On 15 October 2024, he captains Cambodia during an international friendly match against Hong Kong.

== Honours ==
ASEAN All-Stars

- Maybank Challenge Cup: 2025
