= Harrison Delbridge =

Australian professional soccer player

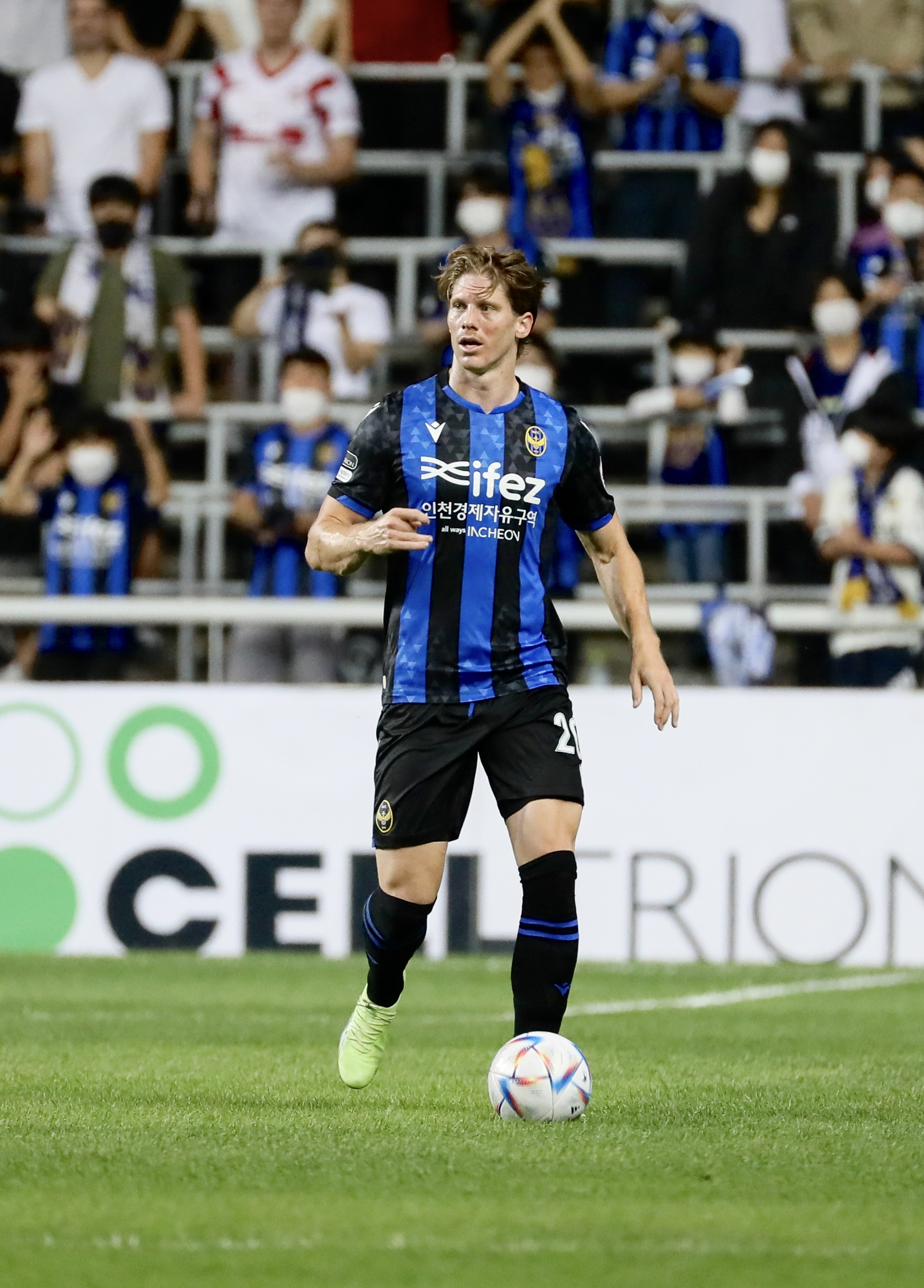
- Delbridge with Incheon United in 2022

Personal information
- Full name: Harrison Andrew Delbridge
- Date of birth: 15 March 1992 (age 34)
- Place of birth: Sydney, Australia
- Height: 6 ft 4 in (1.93 m)
- Position: Centre-back

Team information
- Current team: Melbourne City
- Number: 2

Youth career
- 2007–2010: CASL Chelsea FC

College career
Years	Team	Apps	(Gls)
2010–2013	Appalachian State Mountaineers	54	(9)

Senior career*
Years	Team	Apps	(Gls)
2013	Ventura County Fusion	7	(1)
2014	Sacramento Republic	16	(0)
2015	Portland Timbers 2	18	(1)
2016–2017	FC Cincinnati	58	(4)
2018–2020	Melbourne City	60	(1)
2021–2025	Incheon United	124	(2)
2026–	Melbourne City	4	(0)

International career^{‡}
2022	Australia	1	(0)
- * Club domestic league appearances and goals as of 6 January 2026 ‡ National team caps and goals as of 07:00, 25 September 2022 (UTC)

Harrison Andrew Delbridge (born 15 March 1992) is an Australian professional soccer player who plays as a centre-back for A-League club Melbourne City and the Australia national team.

== Club career ==
=== Youth and amateur ===
Delbridge played four years of college soccer at Division 1 Appalachian State University between the years of 2010 and 2013 playing 54 games, starting in 46 and captaining the team in his senior year. Over the course of his college career he scored 9 goals and had 1 assist and received the following recognitions: NSCAA Scholar All-America Team (2013) NSCAA All South Region Team (2013) NCCSIA University Division 1 All-State Team (2013) All-Conference Team (2013) Adidas Tournament All-Tournament (2012) Southern Conference All-Tournament (2011)

==== Carolina Railhawks ====
In 2012 Delbridge also played for Carolina Railhawks U23 going to the National playoffs. In 2013, he played with Ventura County Fusion in the USL PDL.

=== Sacramento Republic ===
Delbridge signed his first professional contract in March 2014, joining USL Pro expansion club Sacramento Republic. Delbridge made his professional debut in Sacramento's first ever game, a 1–1 draw against LA Galaxy II, and was selected to the USL team of the week for his performance. Under the guidance of head coach Preki and technical director Graham Smith, Sacramento went on to win the USL Championship in their inaugural year.

=== Portland Timbers 2 ===
On 19 February 2015, Delbridge signed with United Soccer League club Portland Timbers 2.

=== FC Cincinnati ===
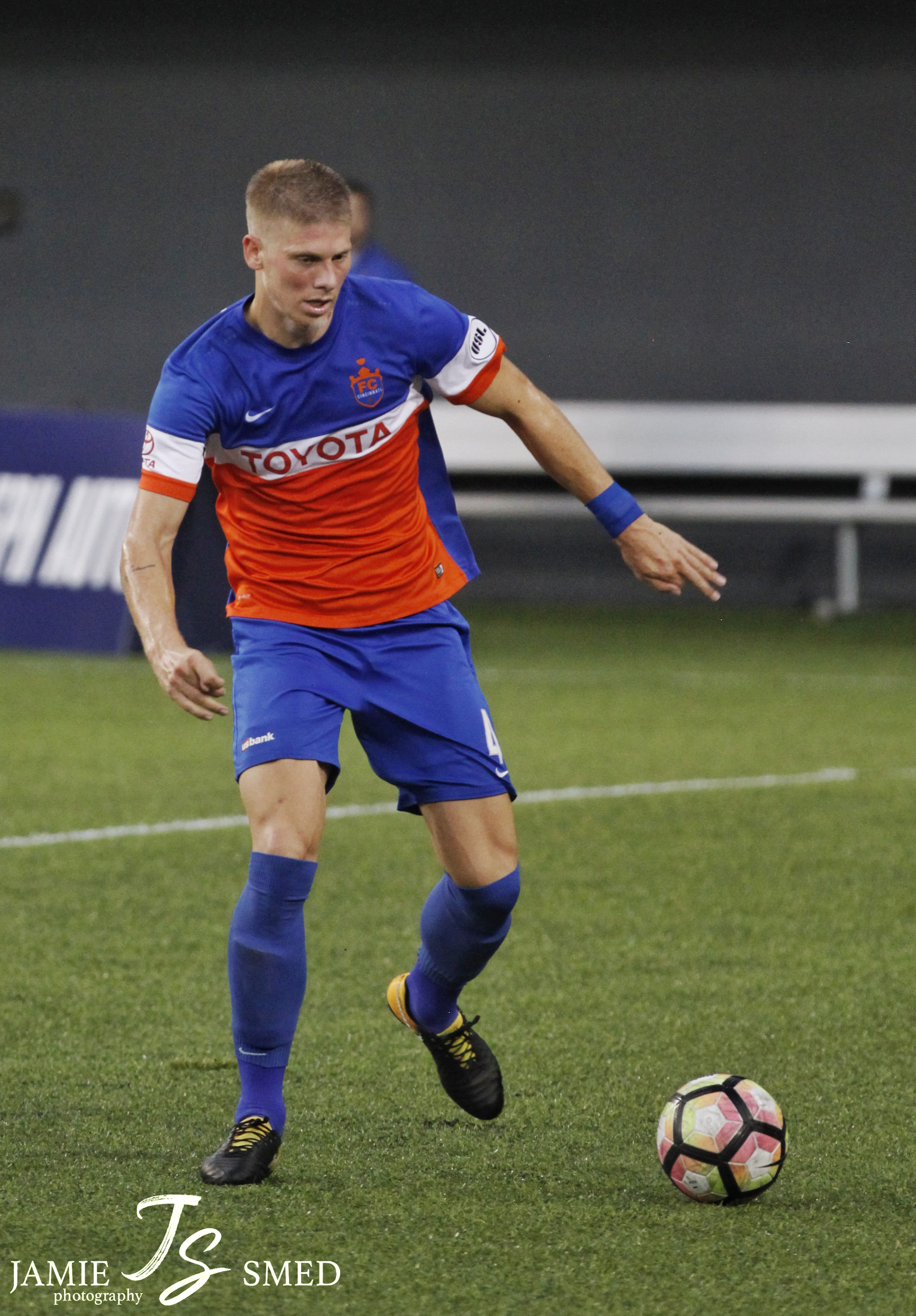
Delbridge playing for FC Cincinnati

Delbridge joined USL expansion side FC Cincinnati on 21 January 2016. He was named to the USL All-League First Team at the end of the 2016 season, and then again at the end of the 2017 season.

=== Melbourne City ===
On 28 November 2017 it was announced that Delbridge signed to A-League club Melbourne City on a three-year contract. On 21 December 2019, Delbridge scored his first goal for the Melbourne City side with a commanding header against local rivals Melbourne Victory. During the 2020 A-League Grand Final, held in Sydney, Delbridge scored a goal that would have put Melbourne City into the lead with their first ever goal in a grand final, however it was ruled out due to offside after VAR intervention.

=== Incheon United ===
On 27 January 2021 it was announced that Delbridge signed to K League 1 club Incheon United on a two-year contract.

=== Return to Melbourne City ===
In January 2026 it was announced that Delbridge had returned to his former club Melbourne City, signing a contract until the end of the 2025–26 A-League Men season.

== International career ==
On 14 September 2022, Delbridge earned his first call-up to the Australia national team.

On 25 September 2022, he made his international debut, being in the starting lineup in the 2–0 win over New Zealand.

== Career statistics ==
=== Club ===
As of match played 8 November 2025

Appearances and goals by club, season and competition
Club	Season	League			Cup		Continental		Total	
Club	Season	Division	Apps	Goals	Apps	Goals	Apps	Goals	Apps	Goals
Ventura County Fusion	2013	Premier Development League	7	0	0	0	—		7	0
Sacramento Republic	2014	USL	16	0	2	1	—		18	1
Portland Timbers 2	2015	USL	18	1	1	0	—		19	1
FC Cincinnati	2016	USL	30	1	1	0	—		31	1
FC Cincinnati	2017	USL	30	3	6	0	—		36	3
FC Cincinnati	Total		60	4	7	0	—		67	4
Melbourne City	2017–18	A-League	12	0	0	0	—		12	0
Melbourne City	2018–19	A-League	24	0	3	0	—		27	0
Melbourne City	2019–20	A-League	24	1	5	0	—		29	1
Melbourne City	Total		60	1	8	0	—		68	1
Incheon United	2021	K League 1	34	1	0	0	—		34	1
Incheon United	2022	K League 1	33	0	0	0	—		33	0
Incheon United	2023	K League 1	25	0	1	0	3	0	29	0
Incheon United	2024	K League 1	16	1	2	0	—		18	1
Incheon United	2025	K League 2	16	0	2	0	—		18	0
Incheon United	Total		124	2	5	0	3	0	132	2
Career total			285	8	23	1	3	0	311	9

== Honours ==
ASEAN All-Stars

- Maybank Challenge Cup: 2025

=== Individual ===
- USL All-League Team: 2016, 2017
