= Haziq Nadzli =

Malaysian footballer (born 1998)

Personal information
- Full name: Muhammad Haziq bin Nadzli
- Date of birth: 6 January 1998 (age 28)
- Place of birth: Kuala Lumpur, Malaysia
- Height: 1.76 m (5 ft 9 in)
- Position: Goalkeeper

Team information
- Current team: Kuching City
- Number: 20

Youth career
- 2013–2015: Harimau Muda C

Senior career*
Years	Team	Apps	(Gls)
2016	PDRM	13	(0)
2017–2025	Johor Darul Ta'zim	8	(0)
2018	Johor Darul Ta'zim II	21	(0)
2024–2025	→ Perak (loan)	19	(0)
2025–	Kuching City	13	(0)

International career^{‡}
2013–2014	Malaysia U16	5	(0)
2015–2017	Malaysia U19	8	(0)
2017–2022	Malaysia U23	15	(0)
2018–	Malaysia	8	(0)
Medal record
Men's football
Representing Malaysia
FIFA ASEAN Cup
Third place	2026 Indonesia	Team
SEA Games
Silver medal – second place	2017 Kuala Lumpur	Football
ASEAN U-16 Boys' Championship
Winner	2013 Myanmar	Team
- * Club domestic league appearances and goals as of 17 June 2025 ‡ National team caps and goals as of 17 November 2026

Muhammad Haziq bin Nadzli (Jawi: محمد حاذق بن ناذلي, IPA: [muhammad hazɪq bɪn nadzlɪ]; born 6 January 1998) is a Malaysian professional footballer who plays as a goalkeeper for Malaysia Super League club Kuching City and the Malaysia national team.

== Club career ==
=== Johor Darul Ta'zim ===
On 3 December 2016, Haziq signed a contract with Malaysia Super League club Johor Darul Ta'zim from PDRM.

On 4 July 2021, Haziq make his AFC Champions League debut against J1 League club, Nagoya Grampus.

During the 2022 season, Haziq would then get his playing chances after first choice goalkeeper, Farizal Marlias suffered an life-threatening injury which he came on as a substitute on 10 October 2022 against Terengganu

==== Loan to Perak ====
On 3 March 2024, Haziq was loaned to Perak for more regular playing time. He make his debut on 11 May in a 3–1 lost against Terengganu.

=== Kuching City ===
On 16 June 2025, Haziq signed a contract with Kuching City permanently from Johor Darul Ta'zim.

== International career ==
Haziq's first international appearance was for Malaysia U-21 in the 2016 Nations Cup.

=== Senior ===
On 22 March 2018, Haziq made his senior debut for Malaysia in a friendly match against Mongolia at the Bukit Jalil National Stadium.

In December 2024, Haziq again received a call-up to the national squad and made his second appearance against Cambodia in the opening match of the 2024 ASEAN Championship.

== Personal life ==
Haziq was engaged to Malaysian actress Eyra Hazali on 1 December 2018. They married in November 2019. From this marriage, they had three children namely, Hayder Qhalish who was born in August 2020 in Ampang Puteri Medical Center, Ampang, Selangor followed by Endra Haziq in July 2022 at KPJ Bandar Dato Onn Hospital and lastly Hud Ezqandar, born in September 2024, at KPJ Ampang Puteri Specialist Hospital.

== Career statistics ==
=== Club ===
As of 10 October 2022.

Appearances and goals by club, season and competition
Club	Season	League			Cup		League Cup		Asia		Total	
Club	Season	Division	Apps	Goals	Apps	Goals	Apps	Goals	Apps	Goals	Apps	Goals
PDRM	2016	Malaysia Super League	13	0	0	0	0	0	0	0	13	0
PDRM	Total		13	0	0	0	0	0	–		13	0
Johor Darul Ta'zim	2017	Malaysia Super League	2	0	0	0	4 (Note: Appearances in Malaysia Cup)	0	2 (Note: Appearances in AFC Cup)	0	8	0
Johor Darul Ta'zim	2018	Malaysia Super League	2	0	0	0	0	0	0	0	2	0
Johor Darul Ta'zim	2019	Malaysia Super League	0	0	0	0	0	0	0	0	0	0
Johor Darul Ta'zim	2020	Malaysia Super League	0	0	0	0	0	0	0	0	0	0
Johor Darul Ta'zim	2021	Malaysia Super League	1	0	0	0	0	0	1	0	2	0
Johor Darul Ta'zim	2022	Malaysia Super League	3	0	0	0	0	0	2	0	5	0
Johor Darul Ta'zim	Total		8	0	0	0	4	0	5	0	17	0
Johor Darul Ta'zim II	2018	Malaysia Premier League	7	0	0	0	6 (Note: Appearances in Malaysia Challenge Cup)	0	0	0	13	0
Johor Darul Ta'zim II	Total		7	0	0	0	6	0	0	0	13	0
Career Total			42	0	0	0	10	0	5	0	57	0

=== International ===
As of 6 October 2026

Appearances and goals by national team and year
National team	Year	Apps	Goals
Malaysia	2018	1	0
Malaysia	2024	3	0
Malaysia	2025	1	0
Malaysia	2026	1	0
Total		6	0

== Honours ==
Johor Darul Ta'zim

- Malaysia Cup: 2017, 2022
- Malaysia Super League: 2017, 2018, 2022
- Piala Sumbangsih: 2022, 2023
- Malaysia FA Cup: 2022, 2023

Johor Darul Ta'zim II

- Malaysia Challenge Cup: 2019

Malaysia U-16

- ASEAN U-16 Boys' Championship: 2013

Malaysia U-23

- SEA Games silver medal: 2017

ASEAN All-Stars

- Maybank Challenge Cup: 2025
