= Shea Lacey =

English footballer (born 2007)

- Lacey with Manchester United in 2026

Personal information
- Full name: Shea Lacey
- Date of birth: 14 April 2007 (age 19)
- Place of birth: Liverpool, England
- Height: 5 ft 6 in (1.67 m)
- Positions: Winger; attacking midfielder

Team information
- Current team: Manchester United
- Number: 31

Youth career
- –2025: Manchester United

Senior career*
Years	Team	Apps	(Gls)
2025–	Manchester United	6	(0)

International career^{‡}
2022	England U15	4	(2)
2022–2023	England U16	10	(2)
2023	England U17	5	(3)
2025–	England U20	6	(4)
- * Club domestic league appearances and goals as of 23:56, 8 November 2026 (UTC) ‡ National team caps and goals as of 15:35, 13 November 2026 (UTC)

Shea Lacey (/ˈʃeɪ/, SHAY; born 14 April 2007) is an English professional footballer who plays as a winger or attacking midfielder for Manchester United. He has played youth international football for England up to under-20 level.

== Early life ==
Lacey was born in Liverpool, and is the younger brother of fellow footballers Paddy and Luis Lacey. Lacey is of Irish descent. Lacey's brothers support Liverpool, but he is a Manchester United fan. He started playing football at the age of three, and also had an interest in boxing as a child. Lacey studied at Ashton-on-Mersey School and Sacred Heart Catholic College.

== Club career ==
After his brother Paddy had rejected Manchester United in favour of Liverpool, their father decided that Luis and Shea would join the Manchester United academy due to its facilities and development opportunities being, in his opinion, of a better standard.

Lacey's impressive performances at youth level led to him being called up to the Manchester United under-18 side, making his debut at the age of 15. He also featured at the REWE Junior Cup in Gottingen, Germany, as well as a number of other international youth tournaments. He scored his first goal at under-18 level in a 3–3 draw with Wolverhampton Wanderers.

He made his debut for the Manchester United under-21 side in a friendly against Dutch side Feyenoord in March 2023.

Lacey signed his first professional contract with United at the age of 17 in April 2024.

He was named in a first-team matchday squad for the first time on 24 November 2025, for a Premier League match against Everton. On 21 December 2025, Lacey made his debut for Manchester United as an 85th-minute substitute for Leny Yoro in a 2–1 loss to Aston Villa in the Premier League.

Lacey made his FA Cup debut as a substitute on 11 January 2026 at Old Trafford against Brighton & Hove Albion, but was sent off in the 89th minute after receiving a second yellow card for dissent.

Lacey came on as a 62nd minute substitute to make his third Premier League appearance against Brighton & Hove Albion on 24 May 2026 under Michael Carrick, becoming the first player to make three Premier League appearances each under a different manager at the club.

Shea made his full first team debut in an EFL cup tie against Brighton on 16 September 2026. He scored after 7 minutes, assisted by new summer signing Youri Tielemans. The team eventually lost 3-2, and were eliminated from the Carabao cup under manager Michael Carrick.

== International career ==
Lacey is eligible to represent England or the Republic of Ireland at international level. He has played youth international football for England at under-15, under-16, under-17 and under-20 levels.

On 6 September 2023, Lacey made his England under-17 debut, providing two assists for England in a 3–2 defeat to Portugal at the Pinatar Arena.

On 10 October 2025, Lacey made his England under-20 debut during a 1–0 defeat to Switzerland at St. George's Park.

== Style of play ==
Comfortable playing in a number of positions, Lacey has been utilised at right-wing for Manchester United's under-18 side, but can also play as an attacking midfielder. He is left-footed, and he is described as a free kick specialist.

== Career statistics ==
=== Club ===
As of match played 8 November 2026

Appearances and goals by club, season and competition
Club	Season	League			FA Cup		EFL Cup		Europe		Other		Total	
Club	Season	Division	Apps	Goals	Apps	Goals	Apps	Goals	Apps	Goals	Apps	Goals	Apps	Goals
Manchester United U21	2025–26	—	—		—		—		—		3 (Note: Appearances in EFL Trophy)	1	3	1
Manchester United	2025–26	Premier League	3	0	1	0	0	0	—		—		4	0
Manchester United	2026–27	Premier League	3	0	0	0	1	1	3 (Note: Appearances in UEFA Champions League)	0	—		7	1
Manchester United	Total		6	0	1	0	1	1	3	0	—		11	1
Career total			6	0	1	0	1	1	3	0	3	1	14	2
