= Jim Thwaites =

English footballer (born 2007)

Personal information
- Full name: Jim Alec Joseph Thwaites
- Date of birth: 20 December 2007 (age 18)
- Place of birth: Lake District, England
- Height: 5 ft 9 in (1.75 m)
- Position: Midfielder

Team information
- Current team: Manchester United
- Number: 51

Youth career
- Manchester United

Senior career*
Years	Team	Apps	(Gls)
2026–	Manchester United	0	(0)

International career^{‡}
2026–	England U20	4	(0)
- * Club domestic league appearances and goals ‡ National team caps and goals as of 21:07, 16 November 2026 (UTC)

Jim Alec Joseph Thwaites (born 20 December 2007) is an English professional footballer who plays as a midfielder for Manchester United.

== Club career ==
As a youth player, Thwaites joined the youth academy of Premier League side Manchester United. During the 2023–24 season, he played for the club's under-16 team, under-18 team, and under-21 team.

Ahead of the 2024–25 season, he signed a first-year scholarship and started training with the senior team. Later that season, he played in the UEFA Youth League.

== International career ==
On 29 September 2026, Thwaites made his debut for England U20 in a victory against France.

== Style of play ==
Thwaites plays as a midfielder. Known for his set piece ability, he has received comparisons to Spain international Thiago Alcântara.

English news website Breaking The Lines wrote in 2025 that he "can operate as both a tempo controller in deeper zones and a chance creator in advanced areas. His ability to turn away from opponents in all areas of the pitch makes him highly effective as an all-phase midfielder".
