= Sékou Koné =

Malian footballer (born 2006)

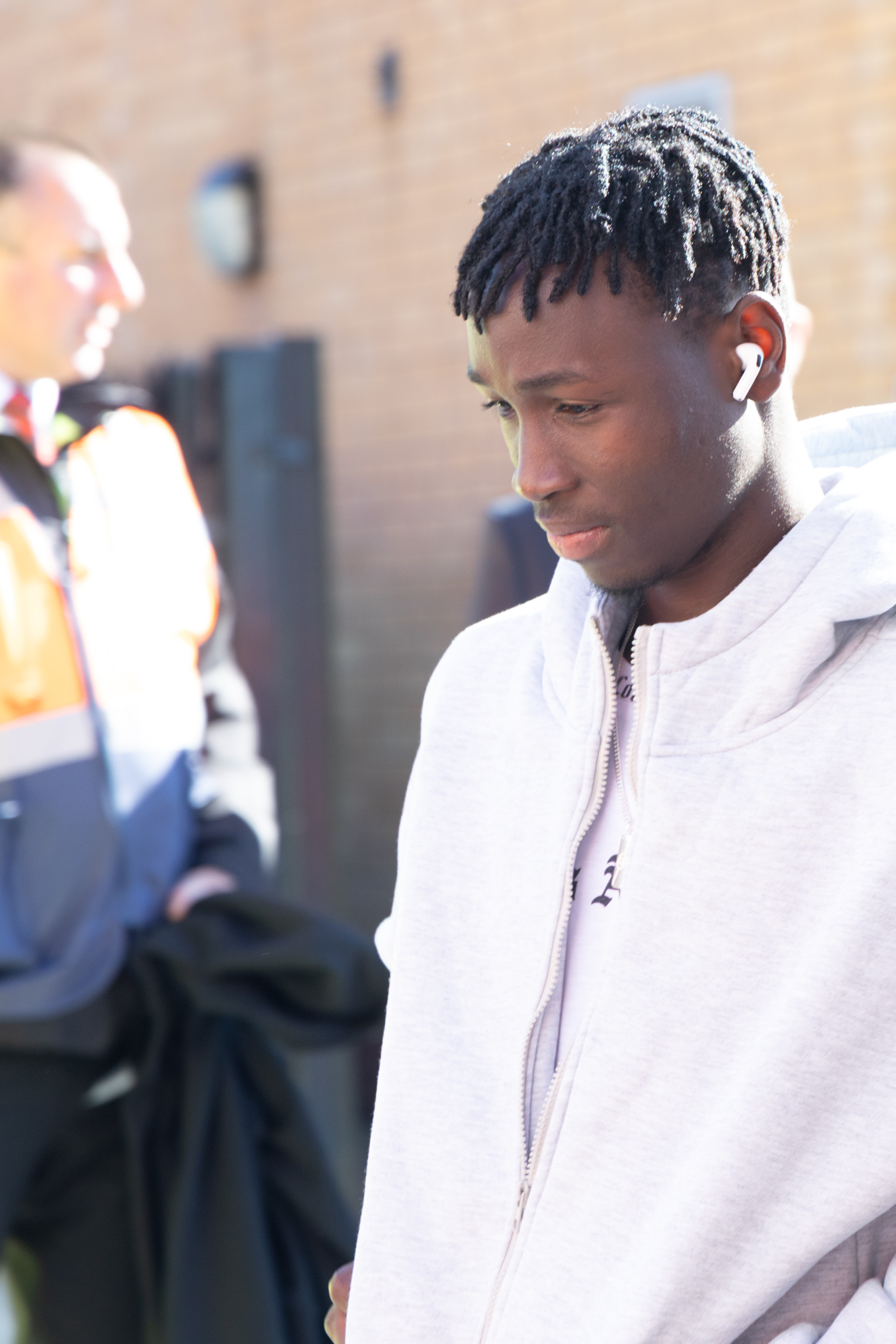
- Koné in 2025

Personal information
- Date of birth: 3 February 2006 (age 20)
- Place of birth: Bamako, Mali
- Height: 5 ft 9 in (1.76 m)
- Position: Defensive midfielder

Team information
- Current team: Lausanne-Sport (on loan from Manchester United)
- Number: 80

Youth career
- JMG Academy
- –2024: Guidars FC
- 2024–2026: Manchester United

Senior career*
Years	Team	Apps	(Gls)
2026–	Manchester United	0	(0)
2026	→ Lausanne-Sport (loan)	5	(0)
2026–	→ Lausanne-Sport (loan)	11	(0)

International career^{‡}
2023	Mali U17	12	(0)
2025–	Mali U20	4	(0)
2025–	Mali U23	3	(2)
Medal record
Men's football
Representing Mali
FIFA U-17 World Cup
Third place	2023 Indonesia
- * Club domestic league appearances and goals as of 15:04, 13 November 2026 (UTC) ‡ National team caps and goals as of 21:16, 8 October 2026 (UTC)

Sékou Koné (born 3 February 2006) is a Malian professional footballer who plays as a defensive midfielder for Swiss Super League club Lausanne-Sport, on loan from Premier League club Manchester United.

Koné joined Manchester United's youth system in August 2024, from Malian club Guidars FC. Since joining United, he has had two spells on loan at Lausanne-Sport.

Koné has played youth international football for Mali up to under-23 level. He was a member of the Mali under-17 team that finished in third-place at the 2023 FIFA U-17 World Cup.

== Club career ==
A graduate of the JMG Academy in Mali, Koné played for Bamako-based club Guidars FC. His performances at the 2023 FIFA U-17 World Cup led to interest from clubs around the world, including England's Manchester United, Crystal Palace and Wolverhampton Wanderers, and Austrian club Red Bull Salzburg.

Koné signed for Manchester United at the age of 18, on 30 August 2024.

On 13 August 2025, he suffered a fractured eye socket while playing for Manchester United's under-21 team in a National League Cup game against Tamworth, which led to the match being abandoned.

On 3 February 2026, it was announced that he would join Swiss Super League club Lausanne-Sport on loan until the end of the 2025–26 season. Koné rejoined Lausanne-Sport in July 2026, on loan until the end of the 2026–27 season.

== International career ==
Koné has played youth international football for Mali at under-17, under-20 and under-23 levels.

He played for Mali at the 2023 U-17 Africa Cup of Nations, where his performances helped Mali to a fourth-place finish, as well as earning Koné a place in the team of the tournament. He then appeared at the 2023 FIFA U-17 World Cup, at which Mali finished third thanks to a 3–0 win over Argentina in the third-place play-off.

On 18 November 2025, Kone scored two goals for the Mali under-23 team in a friendly match against Indonesia, in a 2–2 draw.

== Style of play ==
Koné mainly plays as a defensive midfielder and is known for his ball-winning skills and stamina, which allow him to track back and disrupt opposition play, but he is also capable of getting involved in attacking moves.

His style of play has been compared to that of former Manchester City and Ivory Coast midfielder Yaya Touré by the African media, due to his explosive and energetic displays.

== Career statistics ==
=== Club ===
As of match played 7 November 2026

Appearances and goals by club, season and competition
Club	Season	League			National cup		League cup		Europe		Other		Total	
Club	Season	Division	Apps	Goals	Apps	Goals	Apps	Goals	Apps	Goals	Apps	Goals	Apps	Goals
Manchester United U21	2024–25	—			—		—		—		1 (Note: Appearance in EFL Trophy)	0	1	0
Manchester United U21	2025–26	—			—		—		—		1	0	1	0
Manchester United U21	Total		0	0	0	0	0	0	0	0	2	0	2	0
Manchester United	2025–26	Premier League	0	0	0	0	0	0	—		—		0	0
Manchester United	2026–27	Premier League	0	0	0	0	0	0	0	0	—		0	0
Manchester United	Total		0	0	0	0	0	0	0	0	0	0	0	0
Lausanne-Sport (loan)	2025–26	Swiss Super League	5	0	0	0	—		0	0	—		5	0
Lausanne-Sport (loan)	2026–27	Swiss Super League	11	0	1	1	—		—		—		12	1
Career total			16	0	1	1	0	0	0	0	2	0	19	1

== Honours ==
Mali U17

- FIFA U-17 World Cup third place: 2023

Individual

- U-17 Africa Cup of Nations Best XI: 2023
