= Jaydan Kamason =

English footballer (born 1998)

Personal information
- Full name: Jaydan Dejon Kamason
- Date of birth: 8 December 2006 (age 19)
- Place of birth: England
- Height: 1.80 m (5 ft 11 in)
- Position: Defender

Team information
- Current team: Manchester United
- Number: 56

Youth career
- Stockport Vikings
- Manchester United

Senior career*
Years	Team	Apps	(Gls)
2025–	Manchester United	0	(0)

International career^{‡}
2021–2022	England U16	2	(0)
- * Club domestic league appearances and goals ‡ National team caps and goals as of 22 December 2021

Jaydan Dejon Kamason (born 8 December 2006) is an English professional footballer who plays as a defender for Manchester United.

== Club career ==
As a youth player, Kamason joined the youth academy of Stockport Vikings. Subsequently, he joined the youth academy of Premier League side Manchester United where he played in the UEFA Youth League and helped the club's under-18 team win the league title and the 2023–24 U18 Premier League Cup. In 2023, he became the first player from their Emerging Talent Programme to sign a professional contract.

== Style of play ==
Kamason primarily operates as a right-back but is also capable of playing as a wing-back or on the left side of defence. He is known for his pace, athleticism and attacking style of play, frequently making overlapping runs and carrying the ball forward to support attacks. His ability to beat opponents in wide areas and deliver crosses makes him an attacking outlet from defence.

Defensively, Kamason uses his speed, anticipation and tackling ability to challenge opponents and recover possession. Having played as a centre-back during his earlier development, he combines defensive awareness with a willingness to advance into attacking positions.

Former Manchester United Under-18 coach Adam Lawrence praised Kamason's athleticism, consistency and attacking contributions, highlighting his improvement in the final third. His performances have also drawn attention for his direct running, crossing ability and capacity to contribute at both ends of the pitch.

American newspaper The New York Times wrote in 2025 that he has "shown the directness and dynamism that the role demands".

== Personal life ==
Born in England, Kamason is of Sierra Leonean descent. He was educated at the Manchester Grammar School.
