= 2018–19 Stoke City F.C. season =

Stoke City
2018–19 season
- Chairman: Peter Coates
- Manager: Gary Rowett (until 8 January); Nathan Jones (from 9 January)
- Stadium: bet365 Stadium
- Championship: 16th
- FA Cup: Third round
- EFL Cup: Third round
- Top goalscorer: League: Benik Afobe (8); All: Benik Afobe (9)
- Highest home attendance: 28,586 v Leeds United (19 January 2019)
- Lowest home attendance: 22,078 v Swansea City (18 September 2018)
- Average home league attendance: 25,200
Home colours	Away colours

The 2018–19 season was Stoke City's 102nd season in the Football League, and the 42nd in the second tier.

Following the previous season's relegation from the Premier League, Stoke replaced Paul Lambert with Gary Rowett who was tasked with mounting a promotion challenge. Inevitably there were a large number of departures and new arrivals during the summer, Stoke spending over £30 million on Benik Afobe, Sam Clucas, Peter Etebo, Tom Ince and James McClean. However Stoke made a bad start to the campaign losing against Leeds United, Wigan Athletic and West Bromwich Albion. Stoke struggled to close the gap on the play-off positions despite going on a ten-game unbeaten run of which six were draws and ended 2018 in mid-table. Rowett was sacked at the beginning of January 2019 and was replaced by Luton Town's Nathan Jones.

Despite an early victory over Leeds United it soon became apparent that a squad re-build would be required so Jones experimented with his squad for the remainder of the campaign with Stoke eventually finishing in 16th position after drawing a record 22 times (of which nine were 0–0).

== Pre-season ==
Stoke were relegated from the Premier League after a 2–1 defeat to Crystal Palace on 5 May 2018. Following relegation, Jack Butland and Charlie Adam criticised the club's transfer policy and the behaviour of some of their teammates. John Coates and Peter Coates released a joint statement where they admitted that a major overhaul is required and that they should have dismissed Mark Hughes earlier. Paul Lambert left Stoke on 18 May 2018 by mutual consent after winning just two of his 15 games in charge. The board decided to go for Derby County manager Gary Rowett, and he signed a three-year contract on 22 May after the clubs agreed compensation. He brought with him four coaches, Callum Davidson, Rory Delap, Kevin Phillips & Mark Sale.

Following relegation there was as expected major transfer activity made by the club prior to the start of the season. Going out were, Lee Grant to Manchester United, Stephen Ireland and Glen Johnson both released, Xherdan Shaqiri to Liverpool, Ramadan Sobhi to Huddersfield Town and Kevin Wimmer on loan to Hannover 96. Arriving at Stoke were goalkeeper Adam Federici, experienced centre back Ashley Williams, Nigerian midfielder Peter Etebo, wingers Tom Ince and James McClean and forward Benik Afobe.

Stoke returned to training in late June and played a behind close doors match against Macclesfield Town on 10 July, winning 5–2. City's first public outing was against Walsall at the Bescot Stadium. Goals from Ibrahim Afellay, Bojan and Peter Crouch gave Stoke a 3–0 win. The squad then spent a week at a training camp in Herzlake, Germany. They played three matches against VfL Bochum, SV Meppen and Hamburger SV, City losing all three games. Stoke then played out a goalless draw at home to Wolverhampton Wanderers. Stoke ended their pre-season with a 2–0 defeat at FC St. Pauli.

Match	Date	Opponent	Venue	Result	Scorers	Report
1	10 July 2018	Macclesfield Town	H	5–2	Afobe 7', Choupo-Moting 47', Crouch 59', Berahino 76', Campbell 90'	Report
2	14 July 2018	Walsall	A	3–0	Bojan 3', Afellay 5', Crouch 61'	Report
3	18 July 2018	VfL Bochum	A	0–2		Report
4	21 July 2018	SV Meppen	A	0–1		Report
5	21 July 2018	Hamburger SV	A	1–2	Pieters 15'	Report
6	25 July 2018	Wolverhampton Wanderers	H	0–0		Report
7	28 July 2018	FC St. Pauli	A	0–2		Report

== Championship ==
=== August ===
Stoke began the campaign away at Leeds United and made a terrible start, being well beat 3–1. Stoke were 2–0 down at half time with goals from Mateusz Klich and Pablo Hernández. Stoke pulled one back with Benik Afobe scoring a penalty but a Liam Cooper header ensured a Leeds win. City's first home match ended in a 1–1 draw against Brentford. Afobe scored for Stoke capitalising on a mistake from Chris Mepham and keeper Dan Bentley. Stoke were unimpressive throughout the match and Brentford earned a deserved point thanks to an Ollie Watkins strike. After the match Rowett said that some of his players "need to wake up". Stoke drew again this time 2–2 at Preston North End. Preston took the lead through a Paul Gallagher penalty after Tom Edwards had handled in the area. Stoke responded immediately with Erik Pieters scoring a rare goal however Graham Burke fired North End back in front just before half time. Peter Crouch rescued a point for Stoke with a towering header. Stoke were then easily beaten 3–0 at home by Wigan Athletic. Rowett made several changes to his team for the visit of Hull City. Stoke were able to gain their first win of the season with goals from James McClean and an own goal from Tigers defender Jordy de Wijs.

=== September ===
Prior to the match against West Bromwich Albion Rowett trimmed his squad by loaning out Badou Ndiaye, Geoff Cameron, Giannelli Imbula and Julien Ngoy whilst Eric Maxim Choupo-Moting joined Paris Saint-Germain on a free transfer. Stoke were beaten 2–1 by the Baggies with a brace from Dwight Gayle and a consolation strike by Pieters. Rowett was again critical of his players following the match calling them "dopey". After the international break Stoke traveled to Hillsborough to take on Sheffield Wednesday. Stoke made a good start to the match with Afobe scoring twice early on. However The Owls earned a 2–2 draw with goals from Marco Matias and Barry Bannan. Stoke then went on to beat Swansea City 1–0 with Joe Allen scoring the only goal against his former club. The Potters then faced Tony Mowbray's Blackburn Rovers where another awful defensive display saw them 3–0 down after 46 minutes. Stoke pulled two goals back through Saido Berahino and Tom Ince and did have a chance to draw level but Berahino missed a late penalty and it finished 3–2 to Rovers. Stoke's defensive woes continued in the final match of September at Rotherham United. Despite dominating the first half The Millers scored twice within minutes of the restart with a Ryan Manning penalty and Richie Towell's close-range finish. Stoke made a comeback with goals from Ince and Bojan and the match finished in a 2–2 draw.

=== October ===
Stoke opened October by defeating Phil Parkinson's Bolton Wanderers 2–0 with goals from Ince and a rare header from Bruno Martins Indi. City then won back to back matches for the first time since January 2017 with a 1–0 away success at Norwich City, Timm Klose scoring an own goal. After the international break Stoke lost 1–0 at home to Birmingham City with Rowett being sent to the stands after Stoke were denied a late penalty. Stoke then drew 1–1 at Sheffield United with a Joe Allen free kick cancelling out a goal from Leon Clarke. The Potters ended October with a hard-fought win away at Bristol City with Darren Fletcher volleying in the only goal. In the second half Jack Butland made a number of fine saves to deny the Robins.

=== November ===
Former manager Tony Pulis brought his Middlesbrough side to Stoke on 3 November which saw both sides cancel each other out in a goalless draw. City again drew 0–0 the following week away at midlands rivals Nottingham Forest. There was some controversy in the match as Forest keeper Costel Pantilimon avoided a red card after rushing out of his area and bringing down Afobe. Following the final international break of 2018 Stoke returned to league football with a visit from Queens Park Rangers. After going 1–0 down through an early Àngel Rangel header Stoke turned the game around with goals from Berahino and Allen. However Stoke were unable to see out the victory as Rangel scored again to earn QPR a 2–2 draw. Stoke then came up against manager Gary Rowett's former team Derby County whose supporters were unhappy with the way he left them, which gave the match a spiky atmosphere. Sam Clucas scored his first goal for the club after 24 minutes before Peter Etebo was sent off for a high tackle on Richard Keogh. A scuffle broke out between Joe Allen and Bradley Johnson where Johnson appeared to try and bite Allen. Johnson was later given a retrospective ban by the FA. Harry Wilson equalized for the Rams just after half time via a free-kick but Stoke won 2–1 with former Derby player Tom Ince getting the winning goal.

=== December ===
Stoke then missed the opportunity to close the gap on the play-off positions against lowly Reading. Stoke were guilty of wasteful finishing before Marc McNulty headed the Royals in front just before half time. City turned the game around in the second half with Afobe ending a ten-game run without a goal and a fine volley from Tom Ince, however Modou Barrow fired in a stoppage time equaliser. Stoke faced Paul Lambert's rock bottom Ipswich Town on 8 December and won 2–0 with goals from Ince and Allen, although the team came in criticism from supporters for a poor display against weak opposition. Stoke extended their unbeaten run to nine games with another 2–2 draw this time away at Aston Villa. Stoke were leading twice through Allen and then an Afobe penalty and on both occasions Villa responded with a penalty from Tammy Abraham and a late header from Jonathan Kodjia. Stoke then labored to a 1–0 home win over relegation threatened Millwall, Berahino heading in the only goal on 61 minutes. Stoke's ten match unbeaten run was ended by Birmingham City on boxing day with goals from Jacques Maghoma and Omar Bogle. Stoke ended a forgettable 2018 with a drab 0–0 draw at relegation threatened Bolton Wanderers which prompted an angry reaction by the traveling supporters who chanted against Rowett.

=== January ===
Stoke began 2019 with a 2–0 home defeat against Bristol City with Famara Diedhiou scoring twice after Afobe had missed an early penalty which lead to more angry reactions towards Rowett from supporters. Inevitably Rowett was sacked by the club the following week. The Stoke board moved quickly to appoint Luton Town's Welsh manager Nathan Jones. Jones's first match in charge was away at Thomas Frank's Brentford. The size of the re-building job quickly became apparent to Jones as the Bees rushed into a 2–0 lead before Afobe pulled one back for Stoke, however Rico Henry ensured three points for Brentford. The buildup to Nathan Jones' first home match took a bizarre twist as Leeds United manager Marcelo Bielsa admitted that he had been sending members of his staff to spy on Championship opponents training sessions. To counter this Jones set Stoke up in a 3–5–2 formation with 19-year-old Tyrese Campbell given his first league start and Charlie Adam and Moritz Bauer returning to the team after being outcast by Rowett. Stoke produced their best display of the season against the league leaders, winning 2–1 with goals from Clucas and Allen, whilst Ezgjan Alioski scored a consolation for Leeds who had Pontus Jansson sent-off. Stoke ended January with a 2–0 home defeat against Preston.

Jones began to trim his squad in the January transfer window, departing the club were Ibrahim Afellay who had his contract terminated, Cuco Martina's loan spell cancelled, Erik Pieters going out on loan and most notably the long serving Peter Crouch joining Burnley. Jones brought in two players, defender Danny Batth from Wolverhampton Wanderers and striker Sam Vokes from Burnley.

=== February ===
Stoke's new additions Batth and Vokes both started away at in-form Hull City, Stoke again losing 2–0 with goals from Jarrod Bowen and Kamil Grosicki, with Vokes missing a penalty. City then lost a third in a row without scoring, going down 1–0 to promotion hopefuls West Bromwich Albion. On 12 February Gordon Banks died at the age of 81, he helped Stoke win the 1972 League Cup and England the 1966 FIFA World Cup, supporters paid tribute to him at his statue outside the bet365 Stadium. Stoke then kept a first clean sheet under Jones away at Wigan Athletic but failed to find the net for a fourth match in a drab goalless draw. Stoke's barren run continued as they could only muster a 1–1 draw away at bottom of the table, Ipswich Town. Stoke paid their respects to Gordon Banks before the match against Aston Villa with Jack Butland wearing a special classic green goalkeeping top. The match itself ended in another 1–1 draw, Sam Vokes' first goal for the club being cancelled out by Albert Adomah.

=== March ===
The following week Stoke ended a run of six games without a win against play-off chasing Nottingham Forest, with fine strikes from Afobe and Peter Etebo's first for the club. City then travelled to Loftus Road to face fellow mid-table side Queens Park Rangers. Sam Clucas was sent-off inside the opening 10 minutes of the match for stamping on Josh Scowen. The team produced a dogged defensive performance from then on and frustrated Rangers who had Grant Hall dismissed for two bookable offenses and the match ended goalless. Four days later Stoke ground out another drab goalless draw this time at play-off contenders Derby County. The Potters began their next match at home to Reading brightly hitting the woodwork twice through Ince and then Vokes but that was as good as it got as Stoke played out yet another goalless draw. Following the international break Stoke took on Sheffield Wednesday and played out a fourth consecutive goalless draw.

=== April ===
Stoke ended their barren run in front of goal with a 1–0 success away at Blackburn Rovers, Peter Etebo scoring the only goal after 14 minutes. Stoke were then easily beaten away at Swansea City 3–1, with Martins Indi and Tom Edwards both being sent-off. Stoke followed this up with another poor performance this time against Rotherham United blowing a 2–0 half time lead to draw 2–2. Stoke lost 1–0 away at Middlesbrough on Good Friday with Britt Assombalonga scoring after only two minutes. On Easter Monday Stoke played against top of the table Norwich City. Onel Hernandez gave the Canaries a first half lead before a much improved second half display from Stoke saw Ashley Williams and Tom Edwards score their first goals for the club either side of a Teemu Pukki header. Stoke ended April with a ninth goalless draw of the season away at Millwall.

=== May ===
Stoke ended a hugely disappointing 2018–19 campaign against promoted Sheffield United. Sam Vokes volleyed Stoke in front after 19 minutes which was cancelled out by Kieran Dowell. Shawcross scored a rare goal to restore City's lead but Enda Stevens ensured Stoke would draw a 22nd match of the season.

=== Results ===
Match	Date	Opponent	Venue	Result	Attendance	Scorers	Report
1	5 August 2018	Leeds United	A	1–3	34,126	Afobe 52' (pen)	Report
2	11 August 2018	Brentford	H	1–1	24,806	Afobe 29'	Report
3	18 August 2018	Preston North End	A	2–2	13,996	Pieters 42', Crouch 61'	Report
4	22 August 2018	Wigan Athletic	H	0–3	23,158		Report
5	25 August 2018	Hull City	H	2–0	23,311	McClean 9', de Wijs 59' (o.g.)	Report
6	1 September 2018	West Bromwich Albion	A	1–2	25,183	Pieters 90+5'	Report
7	15 September 2018	Sheffield Wednesday	A	2–2	24,905	Afobe (2) 2', 22'	Report
8	18 September 2018	Swansea City	H	1–0	22,078	Allen 57'	Report
9	22 September 2018	Blackburn Rovers	H	2–3	25,673	Berahino 79', Ince 80'	Report
10	29 September 2018	Rotherham United	A	2–2	9,706	Ince 59', Bojan 85'	Report
11	2 October 2018	Bolton Wanderers	H	2–0	22,116	Martins Indi 10', Ince 74'	Report
12	6 October 2018	Norwich City	A	1–0	24,992	Klose 35' (o.g.)	Report
13	20 October 2018	Birmingham City	H	0–1	28,160		Report
14	23 October 2018	Sheffield United	A	1–1	24,463	Allen 88'	Report
15	27 October 2018	Bristol City	A	1–0	22,456	Fletcher 33'	Report
16	3 November 2018	Middlesbrough	H	0–0	24,553		Report
17	10 November 2018	Nottingham Forest	A	0–0	28,556		Report
18	24 November 2018	Queens Park Rangers	H	2–2	24,291	Berahino 21', Allen 61'	Report
19	28 November 2018	Derby County	H	2–1	25,147	Clucas 24', Ince 50'	Report
20	1 December 2018	Reading	A	2–2	14,414	Afobe 48', Ince 69'	Report
21	8 December 2018	Ipswich Town	H	2–0	24,694	Ince 45+2', Allen 60'	Report
22	15 December 2018	Aston Villa	A	2–2	36,999	Allen 47', Afobe 78' (pen)	Report
23	22 December 2018	Millwall	H	1–0	25,351	Berahino 61'	Report
24	26 December 2018	Birmingham City	A	0–2	26,344		Report
25	29 December 2018	Bolton Wanderers	A	0–0	15,309		Report
26	1 January 2019	Bristol City	H	0–2	23,912		Report
27	12 January 2019	Brentford	A	1–3	9,439	Afobe 23'	Report
28	19 January 2019	Leeds United	H	2–1	28,586	Clucas 49', Allen 88'	Report
29	26 January 2019	Preston North End	H	0–2	25,053		Report
30	2 February 2019	Hull City	A	0–2	12,776		Report
31	9 February 2019	West Bromwich Albion	H	0–1	26,828		Report
32	13 February 2019	Wigan Athletic	A	0–0	9,914		Report
33	16 February 2019	Ipswich Town	A	1–1	15,924	McClean 42'	Report
34	23 February 2019	Aston Villa	H	1–1	27,975	Vokes 5'	Report
35	2 March 2019	Nottingham Forest	H	2–0	26,736	Etebo 15', Afobe 74'	Report
36	9 March 2019	Queens Park Rangers	A	0–0	14,763		Report
37	13 March 2019	Derby County	A	0–0	25,685		Report
38	16 March 2019	Reading	H	0–0	24,368		Report
39	30 March 2019	Sheffield Wednesday	H	0–0	26,398		Report
40	6 April 2019	Blackburn Rovers	A	1–0	17,478	Etebo 14'	Report
41	9 April 2019	Swansea City	A	1–3	17,804	McClean 45'+3	Report
42	13 April 2019	Rotherham United	H	2–2	24,250	Vokes 27', Clucas 29'	Report
43	19 April 2019	Middlesbrough	A	0–1	22,890		Report
44	22 April 2019	Norwich City	H	2–2	25,487	Williams 47', Edwards 69'	Report
45	27 April 2019	Millwall	A	0–0	14,472		Report
46	5 May 2019	Sheffield United	H	2–2	26,665	Vokes 19', Shawcross 69'	Report

=== League table ===
Pos	Team	Pld	W	D	L	GF	GA	GD	Pts
13	Hull City	46	17	11	18	66	68	−2	62
14	Preston North End	46	16	13	17	67	67	0	61
15	Blackburn Rovers	46	16	12	18	64	69	−5	60
16	Stoke City	46	11	22	13	45	52	−7	55
17	Birmingham City	46	14	19	13	64	58	+6	52 (Note: Birmingham City were deducted 9 points for failure to comply with the EFL profitability and sustainability rules.)
18	Wigan Athletic	46	13	13	20	51	64	−13	52
19	Queens Park Rangers	46	14	9	23	53	71	−18	51

Source: Sky Sports Archived 25 September 2019 at the Wayback Machine
Rules for classification: 1) Points; 2) Goal difference; 3) Number of goals scored; 4) Head-to-head results

== FA Cup ==
Stoke were drawn away against EFL League One side Shrewsbury Town in the third round and could only manage a 1–1 draw with Peter Crouch cancelling out Oliver Norburn's penalty, sending the tie to a replay. In the replay Stoke took a 2–0 lead through Tyrese Campbell's first senior goals before a second half capitulation saw them beaten 3–2.

Round	Date	Opponent	Venue	Result	Attendance	Scorers	Report
R3	5 January 2019	Shrewsbury Town	A	1–1	7,512	Crouch 78'	Report
R3 Replay	15 January 2019	Shrewsbury Town	H	2–3	10,261	Campbell (2) 20', 36'	Report

== EFL Cup ==
Stoke were drawn at home to Huddersfield Town in the second round of the EFL Cup. Stoke won 2–0 against the Terriers with goals from Saido Berahino, ending his 48-game run without scoring and a bizarre own goal from Juninho Bacuna. Stoke exited the EFL Cup in the third round, losing 3–2 away at Nottingham Forest.

Round	Date	Opponent	Venue	Result	Attendance	Scorers	Report
R2	28 August 2018	Huddersfield Town	H	2–0	7,290	Berahino 53', Bacuna 90+7' (o.g.)	Report
R3	26 September 2018	Nottingham Forest	A	2–3	12,915	Afobe 60', Berahino 83'	Report

== Squad statistics ==
No.	Pos.	Name	Championship		FA Cup		League Cup		Total		Discipline	
No.	Pos.	Name	Apps	Goals	Apps	Goals	Apps	Goals	Apps	Goals	Yellow card	Red card
1	GK	(England) Jack Butland	45	0	0	0	0	0	45	0	0	0
2	DF	(Austria) Moritz Bauer	6(2)	0	1	0	1(1)	0	8(3)	0	1	0
3	DF	(Netherlands) Erik Pieters	21	2	1	0	1	0	23	2	3	0
4	MF	(Wales) Joe Allen	46	6	0	0	0	0	46	6	8	0
5	DF	(Wales) Ashley Williams	27(6)	1	2	0	2	0	31(6)	1	7	1
6	MF	(Senegal) Badou Ndiaye	1	0	0	0	0	0	1	0	0	0
7	MF	(England) Tom Ince	36(2)	6	2	0	0(1)	0	38(3)	6	2	0
8	MF	(Nigeria) Peter Etebo	29(5)	2	2	0	1	0	32(5)	2	7	1
9	FW	(Democratic Republic of the Congo) Benik Afobe	32(13)	8	1(1)	0	1(1)	1	33(15)	9	0	0
10	FW	(Wales) Sam Vokes	10(2)	3	0	0	0	0	10(2)	3	0	0
11	MF	(Republic of Ireland) James McClean	32(10)	3	1(1)	0	1	0	34(11)	3	10	0
12	DF	(England) Josh Tymon	1	0	1	0	0	0	2	0	0	0
14	DF	(England) Danny Batth	17	0	0	0	0	0	17	0	2	0
15	DF	(Netherlands) Bruno Martins Indi	36(1)	1	2	0	2	0	40(1)	1	6	1
16	MF	(Scotland) Charlie Adam	3(8)	0	1	0	1(1)	0	5(9)	0	5	0
17	DF	(England) Ryan Shawcross (c)	33(3)	1	0	0	0	0	33(3)	1	6	0
18	FW	(Senegal) Mame Biram Diouf	6(8)	0	0(1)	0	1	0	7(9)	0	0	0
19	FW	(Burundi) Saido Berahino	16(7)	3	1	0	2	2	19(7)	5	0	0
22	MF	(England) Sam Clucas	23(3)	3	2	0	0	0	25(3)	3	2	1
23	DF	(Curaçao) Cuco Martina	17	0	0	0	1	0	18	0	4	0
24	MF	(Scotland) Darren Fletcher	4(7)	1	0	0	2	0	6(7)	1	1	0
25	FW	(England) Peter Crouch	2(21)	1	1(1)	1	1	0	4(22)	2	2	0
26	FW	(England) Tyrese Campbell	2(1)	0	1(1)	2	0(1)	0	3(3)	2	0	0
27	FW	(Spain) Bojan	8(12)	1	0	0	1(1)	0	9(13)	1	0	0
29	GK	(Denmark) Jakob Haugaard	0	0	0	0	0	0	0	0	0	0
30	DF	(England) Tom Edwards	22(5)	1	1	0	1	0	24(5)	1	3	1
31	MF	(Belgium) Thibaud Verlinden	3(2)	0	0	0	0	0	3(2)	0	0	0
32	GK	(Australia) Adam Federici	1	0	2	0	2	0	5	0	0	0
33	MF	(Denmark) Lasse Sørensen	0(1)	0	0	0	0	0	0(1)	0	0	0
34	MF	(England) Ollie Shenton	0	0	0	0	0	0	0	0	0	0
36	DF	(Australia) Harry Souttar	0	0	0	0	1	0	1	0	0	0
37	DF	(Republic of Ireland) Nathan Collins	1(2)	0	0	0	0	0	1(2)	0	0	0
38	MF	(England) Ryan Woods	26(1)	0	0	0	0	0	26(1)	0	6	0
–	–	Own goals	–	2	–	0	–	1	–	3	–	–

== Transfers ==
=== In ===
Date	Pos.	Name	From	Fee	Ref.
11 June 2018	MF	(Nigeria) Peter Etebo	(Portugal) Feirense	£6.35 million	
2 July 2018	DF	(France) Mohamed Akandji	(France) Amiens	Undisclosed	
2 July 2018	MF	(France) Ibrahim Doucoure	(France) Amiens	Undisclosed	
2 July 2018	MF	(United States) Dillon Keane	(United States) San Jose Earthquakes	Undisclosed	
2 July 2018	MF	(France) Soiyir Sanali	(France) Amiens	Undisclosed	
3 July 2018	GK	(Australia) Adam Federici	(England) Bournemouth	Undisclosed	
22 July 2018	MF	(Republic of Ireland) James McClean	(England) West Bromwich Albion	£5 million	
24 July 2018	MF	(England) Tom Ince	(England) Huddersfield Town	£10 million	
9 August 2018	MF	(England) Sam Clucas	(Wales) Swansea City	£6 million	
1 January 2019	FW	(Democratic Republic of the Congo) Benik Afobe	(England) Wolverhampton Wanderers	Undisclosed	
4 January 2019	MF	(England) Ryan Woods	(England) Brentford	Undisclosed	
29 January 2019	DF	(England) Danny Batth	(England) Wolverhampton Wanderers	£3 million	
31 January 2019	FW	(Wales) Sam Vokes	(England) Burnley	Undisclosed	
1 February 2019	DF	(Republic of Ireland) Ryan Corrigan	(England) Manchester City	Undisclosed	

=== Out ===
Date	Pos.	Name	To	Fee	Ref.
1 June 2018	FW	(France) Hakim Abdallah	(France) Nantes	Free	
1 June 2018	GK	(England) Mitchell Allen	Released	Free	
1 June 2018	FW	(Republic of Ireland) Shola Ayoola	Released	Free	
1 June 2018	DF	(England) Lewis Banks	(England) Stafford Rangers	Free	
1 June 2018	DF	(Portugal) Luis Da Silva	Released	Free	
1 June 2018	FW	(England) Jordan Greenridge	(Cyprus) AC Omonia	Free	
1 June 2018	MF	(England) Ryan Hill	(England) Hampton & Richmond Borough	Free	
1 June 2018	MF	(Republic of Ireland) Stephen Ireland	(England) Bolton Wanderers	Free	
1 June 2018	DF	(England) Glen Johnson	Released	Free	
1 June 2018	MF	(France) Eddy Lecygne	Released	Free	
1 June 2018	MF	(Portugal) Venancio da Silva Monteiro	Released	Free	
1 June 2018	DF	(England) Connor Russo	Released	Free	
12 June 2018	MF	(Egypt) Ramadan Sobhi	(England) Huddersfield Town	£5.7 million	
27 June 2018	DF	(Spain) Marc Muniesa	(Spain) Girona	Undisclosed	
3 July 2018	GK	(England) Lee Grant	(England) Manchester United	Undisclosed	
13 July 2018	MF	(Switzerland) Xherdan Shaqiri	(England) Liverpool	£13.5 million	
24 July 2018	FW	(England) Dom Telford	(England) Bury	Free	
31 August 2018	FW	(Cameroon) Eric Maxim Choupo-Moting	(France) Paris Saint-Germain	Free	
14 January 2019	MF	(Hungary) Krisztofer Szerető	(Hungary) Ferencvaros	Free	
28 January 2019	MF	(Netherlands) Ibrahim Afellay	Released	Mutual consent	
29 January 2019	DF	(Guinea) Mohamed Diallo	Released	Free	
29 January 2019	DF	(Republic of Ireland) Ryan Sweeney	(England) Mansfield Town	Free	
31 January 2019	FW	(England) Peter Crouch	(England) Burnley	Part-exchange	

=== Loans in ===
Date from	Pos.	Name	From	Date to	Ref.
12 June 2018	FW	(Democratic Republic of the Congo) Benik Afobe	(England) Wolverhampton Wanderers	1 January 2019	
2 August 2018	DF	(Wales) Ashley Williams	(England) Everton	31 May 2019	
17 August 2018	DF	(Curaçao) Cuco Martina	(England) Everton	31 January 2019	
25 August 2018	MF	(England) Ryan Woods	(England) Brentford	4 January 2019	

=== Loans out ===
Date from	Pos.	Name	To	Date to	Ref.
27 May 2018	DF	(Austria) Kevin Wimmer	(Germany) Hannover 96	31 May 2019	
3 August 2018	DF	(Republic of Ireland) Ryan Sweeney	(England) Mansfield Town	29 January 2019	
4 August 2018	DF	(England) Cameron McJannett	(England) Curzon Ashton	Youth loan	
9 August 2018	GK	(England) Josef Bursik	(England) Hednesford Town	January 2019	
28 August 2018	MF	(Senegal) Badou Ndiaye	(Turkey) Galatasaray	31 May 2019	
29 August 2018	FW	(Belgium) Julien Ngoy	(Switzerland) Grasshopper Club Zürich	31 May 2019	
30 August 2018	MF	(France) Giannelli Imbula	(Spain) Rayo Vallecano	31 May 2019	
31 August 2018	DF	(United States) Geoff Cameron	(England) Queens Park Rangers	31 May 2019	
7 November 2018	DF	(England) James Butler	(England) Hartlepool United	January 2019	
24 November 2018	MF	(Guinea-Bissau) Rachid Baldé	(England) Curzon Ashton	December 2018	
2 January 2019	GK	(England) Josef Bursik	(England) AFC Telford United	31 May 2019	
2 January 2019	GK	(Hungary) Máté Deczki	(England) Hednesford Town	31 May 2019	
3 January 2019	MF	(England) Mark Waddington	(Scotland) Falkirk	31 May 2019	
30 January 2019	DF	(Scotland) Harry Souttar	(England) Fleetwod Town	31 May 2019	
31 January 2019	FW	(England) Tyrese Campbell	(England) Shrewsbury Town	31 May 2019	
31 January 2019	DF	(Netherlands) Erik Pieters	(France) Amiens	31 May 2019	
