= Tile Mountain =

British home improvement retailer

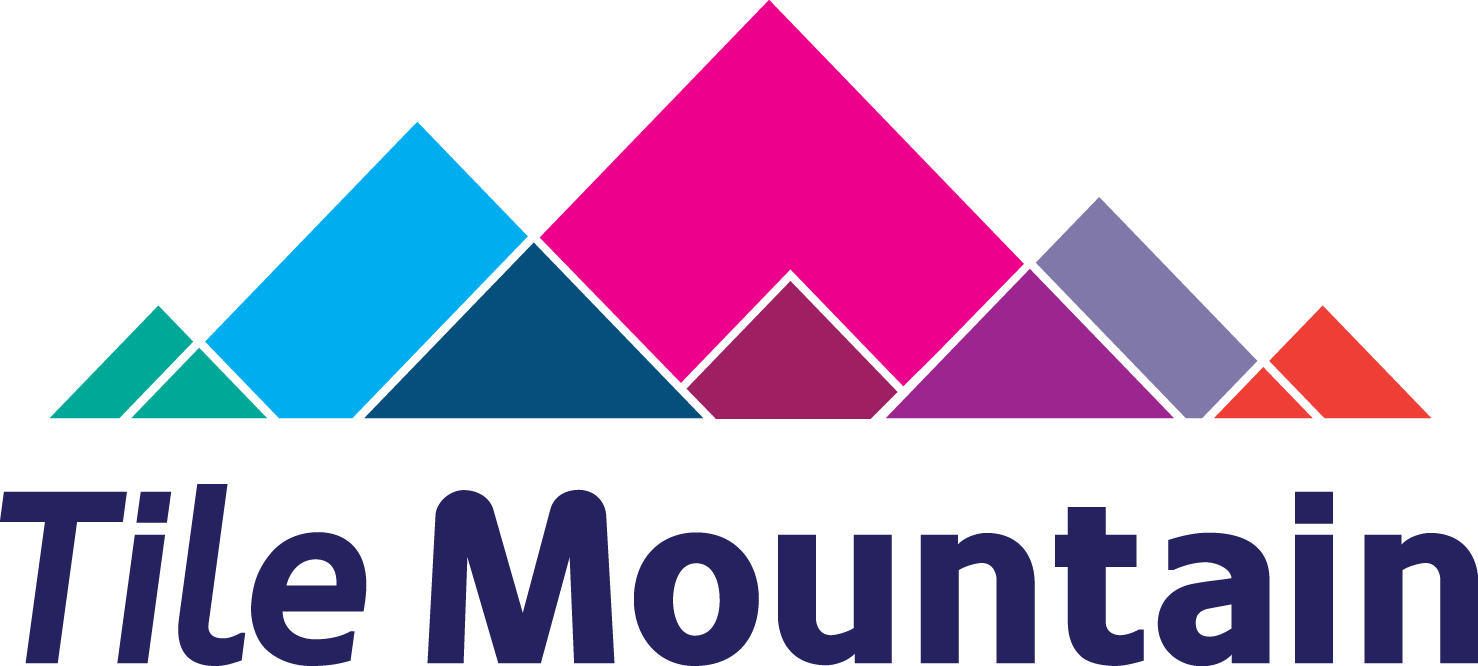
- Type: Private
- Industry: Online retailers
- Founded: 2013
- Founder: Mo Iqbal; Jeremy Harris
- Headquarters: Tunstall, Staffordshire, Stoke-on-Trent
- Key people: Nick Ounstead (NED)
- Website: www.tilemountain.co.uk

Tile Mountain is a company based in Stoke-on-Trent, United Kingdom that retails tiles commonly used in home decor. The company is notable for creating a multitude of jobs in Stoke-on-Trent following the sale of Longton-based Tile Giant for £12 million in 2007. Tile Mountain's business model includes online sales and providing product samples before large orders. Its products are local as well as from various parts of the globe. Tile Mountain currently has stock including tools, trims, Mapei adhesives and underfloor heating, ceramic and natural stone tiles.

Following its expansion, Tile Mountain moved in April 2017 to a new location in Tunstall, Stoke-on-Trent, England. The new facilities of 120,000 sq. ft. include a warehouse, a showroom and an office complex.

May 9, 2019, Tile Mountain acquired competitor Walls and Floors Ltd, making the Tile Mountain Group (comprising Tile Mountain, Capitol Tiles Distribution, and Tons of Tiles)

Tile Mountain opened its third UK showroom in June 2020, situated close to Birmingham city centre. The showroom follows the same design concept as the company's Stoke-on-Trent and Stockport retail spaces and spans 12,000 sq ft across two levels.

In September 2020, the company extended its sponsorship deal with Stoke City FC for a further two years, a move that will see the East Stand at the Bet365 Stadium continue to be named The Tile Mountain Stand until the 2021/2022 season.

Tile Mountain also became the principal away kit partner of Hull Kingston Rovers RFC in April 2021, with the online DIY retailer's branding being displayed on the front of the away shirt for the duration of the 2021 Super League season as part of the deal.

The company further expanded its sport sponsorships in May 2021 when it partnered with 2005 World Snooker Champion and Triple Crown winner, Shaun Murphy. The sponsorship saw Tile Mountain branding adorn the player's apparel during every match he played during his route to the final of the Betfred World Snooker Championship 2021 tournament. Following Murphy's appearance in the final, Tile Mountain extended the deal for a further two years.

The retailer opened its fourth expansive showroom at Liverpool Shopping Park, Edge Lane, Liverpool in September 2021 with a grand opening conducted by Tile Mountain brand ambassador and TV DIY expert, Craig Phillips.
