= Bet365 =

British gambling company

bet365
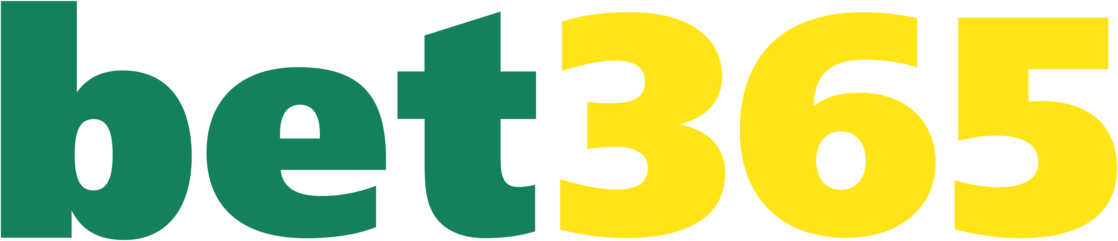
- Website type: Private
- Founded: 2000
- Headquarters: Stoke-on-Trent, England
- Owner: Coates Family
- Founder: Denise Coates
- Key people: Denise Coates (Co-Chief Executive); John Coates (Co-Chief Executive)
- Industry: Gambling
- Products: Sports betting, online casino, online poker, online bingo

bet365 is a British gambling company founded in 2000. Its product offering includes sports betting, online casino, online poker, and online bingo. It was founded by Denise Coates, who remains the majority shareholder and joint-chief executive, alongside her brother John Coates.

bet365 is a trading name of Hillside (New Media) Limited. and operations. Their business operations are conducted from its headquarters in Stoke-on-Trent, alongside further offices in Manchester, Gibraltar, Malta, United States, Bulgaria, Brazil, Colombia and Australia. The group employed over 10,000 people as of 2026.

== History ==
bet365 was founded in 2000 in a portable building in Stoke-On-Trent by Denise Coates. Denise developed a sports betting platform and trading team to launch the business online in March 2001. The business borrowed £15 million from Royal Bank of Scotland against the family's betting shop estate which had been started by Peter Coates in 1974 and had been run by Denise Coates as managing director from 1995. bet365 sold its betting shop chain in 2005 for £40 million to Coral and paid off its loan to RBS.

bet365 chairman Peter Coates was also the chairman at Stoke City and in May 2012 bet365 signed a three-year contract with the club to become shirt sponsors. In April 2016, the company became the new title sponsors for the club's stadium for the next six seasons, replacing fellow local enterprise the Britannia Building Society. In the summer of 2016, bet365 also signed shirt sponsorship deals with Bulgarian clubs Ludogorets Razgrad and Slavia Sofia for the upcoming two seasons.

In the summer of 2019, the largest UK bookmakers and online casino operators William Hill, GVC Holdings, Flutter Entertainment, Stars Group and bet365 entered into an agreement to transfer funds to combat gambling addiction. They agreed to increase the amount from 0.1% to 1% of gross income in the next five years. The initiative was welcomed by a harm reduction group, but also received criticism for its perceived inadequacy; one MP described it as "a bribe to appease campaigners and the UK government".

bet365's reported figures for the 2020 financial year showed revenues of £2.8 billion and a profit of £470 million before tax. In the 2024 fiscal year, Coates' betting corporation recorded revenues of £4 billion, with pre-tax profits of £349 million. Denise Coates had received at least £280 million in salaries and dividends in 2025, making her the highest-paid woman in Britain. Denise continues to run Bet365 and is the majority shareholder with 50.1% of the shares. Her brother John, co-chief executive, runs the business alongside her, with their father Peter serving as chairman. Combined, the Coates family's fortune was estimated at £9.44 billion in March 2025, making them the 16th richest in the UK.

=== Overseas operations ===
In 2018, shortly after the U.S. Supreme Court ruling on sports betting allowed U.S. states to regulate sports betting, bet365 announced plans to launch in the United States starting with the state of New Jersey with a partnership with Hard Rock Hotel and Casino in Atlantic City. The company would later announce in September 2021 that bet365 will launch in Colorado with a licensing and revenue share deal with Century Casinos. bet365 opened up operations in Colorado on 6 September 2022.

In April 2022, bet365 was also launched in Ontario after it was approved by the Alcohol and Gaming Commission of Ontario to conduct sports betting activities in the province following the passing of a new Canadian law that legalized single-game betting.

In Brazil, the company established legal representation through a subsidiary, HS do Brasil Ltda. The platform joined the official list of operators approved by the Secretariat of Prizes and Betting of the Ministry of Finance in February 2025, following the approval of the sports betting regulatory framework in the country.

In March 2025, the company announced it was ceasing its services in China and other jurisdictions.

In May 2026, bet365 launched in France, becoming the first major international operator to enter the French regulated market since its opening to competition in 2010. The bet365.fr website went live on 26 May 2026, after the company secured a triple licence from the French gambling regulator Autorité nationale des jeux (ANJ), covering sports betting, horse race betting and online poker. The launch took place ahead of the 2026 FIFA World Cup, scheduled to begin on 11 June 2026.

== Awards and achievements ==
At the eGaming Review Operator Awards 2010 organised by eGaming Review magazine, bet365 won the "Operator of the Year" award. bet365 ranked third in The Sunday Times Profit Track 100 league table, which ranks private companies in the UK based on profit growth rate. bet365 was also ranked as one of the fastest growing privately owned technology, media and telecoms companies in The Sunday Times Tech Track 100 league table.

eGaming Review magazine has ranked bet365 the number one Internet gaming company in 2010, 2011 and 2012 as part of its annual Power 50 list of the top 50 most influential Internet gaming companies. Denise Coates, founder and joint CEO of bet365, received a CBE in the 2012 Queen's new year honours list for services to the community and business. In February 2013 Denise Coates was named as one of the 100 most powerful women in the United Kingdom by Woman's Hour at BBC Radio 4.

In December 2024, bet365 won the SBC Bookmaker of the Year for the fifth consecutive year.

== Controversies ==
=== Regulatory non-compliance ===
In October 2014, The Guardian newspaper reported that the company had been taking bets from Chinese citizens by using obscure domain names in order to avoid government web censorship.

In 2016, bet365 was fined A$2.75 million by the Australian Competition & Consumer Commission for misleading advertisements which falsely promised "free bets" to customers.

Although gambling is illegal in most jurisdictions of India, bet365 nonetheless conducted surrogate advertising in the country. India's consumer affairs ministry served notices to various television channels and apps for promoting gambling companies and asked them to stop showing ads from bet365 and other betting platforms immediately.

In March 2024, Australia's financial crime agency, Austrac, initiated an investigation into bet365 for potential non-compliance with anti-money laundering and counter-terrorism financing laws, following an ordered external audit in 2022. In July 2026, bet365 entered into a binding agreement with Austrac to improve its internal anti-money laundering controls following the investigation.

=== Fiduciary duty ===
Denise Coates became the highest paid executive in the UK in 2017, awarding herself a salary of £217 million. In 2018, her pay rose to £265 million as the company reported profits up 31% to £660 million, prompting criticism from problem gambling charity groups. In January 2019, bet365 ranked second on The Sunday Times list of the UK's top taxpayers, with the Coates family (Denise, John and Peter) paying an estimated total tax of £156 million, of which £99 million was paid by Denise alone. Denise was again criticised in 2024, after she received payouts of more than £270 million the year before, including a salary of £220.7 million and dividends of £50 million, despite the company posting a £60 million loss.

=== Refusal to pay ===
Further criticism highlights repeated cases of bet365 delaying or denying payment to winning players. For example, bet365 was taken to court for refusing to pay over £1 million in winnings to a horse bettor in Northern Ireland in 2017. The company refused a payout of £54,000 to a customer in England in 2016, a case which was still ongoing in 2017. In Australia, bet365 froze the account of a punter who had won around A$200,000 in 2016, refusing to pay out. Several other cases of bet365 refusing to pay winnings have been reported by gamblers on Internet gambling forums. In August 2024, the New Jersey Division of Gaming Enforcement ordered that the company was required to pay more than $519,000 to customers it had shorted on payments.

In July 2026, bet365 refused a payout to a British customer after he had won an £8,000 bet placed on England beating Mexico in the 2026 FIFA World Cup. Bet365 claimed the punter's income was not sufficient for his betting activity after triggering a "responsible gambling review" following the payout request, but the gambling operator hadn't raised such concerns over the course of the bettor losing around £20,000 in the previous two years.

== Media ==
In the UK, the face of bet365, since 2010, has been actor Ray Winstone. The company sponsors the shirt and stadium of EFL Championship football club Stoke City F.C., a corporate affiliate.
