= Tyler Fletcher =

Scottish association football player (born 2007)

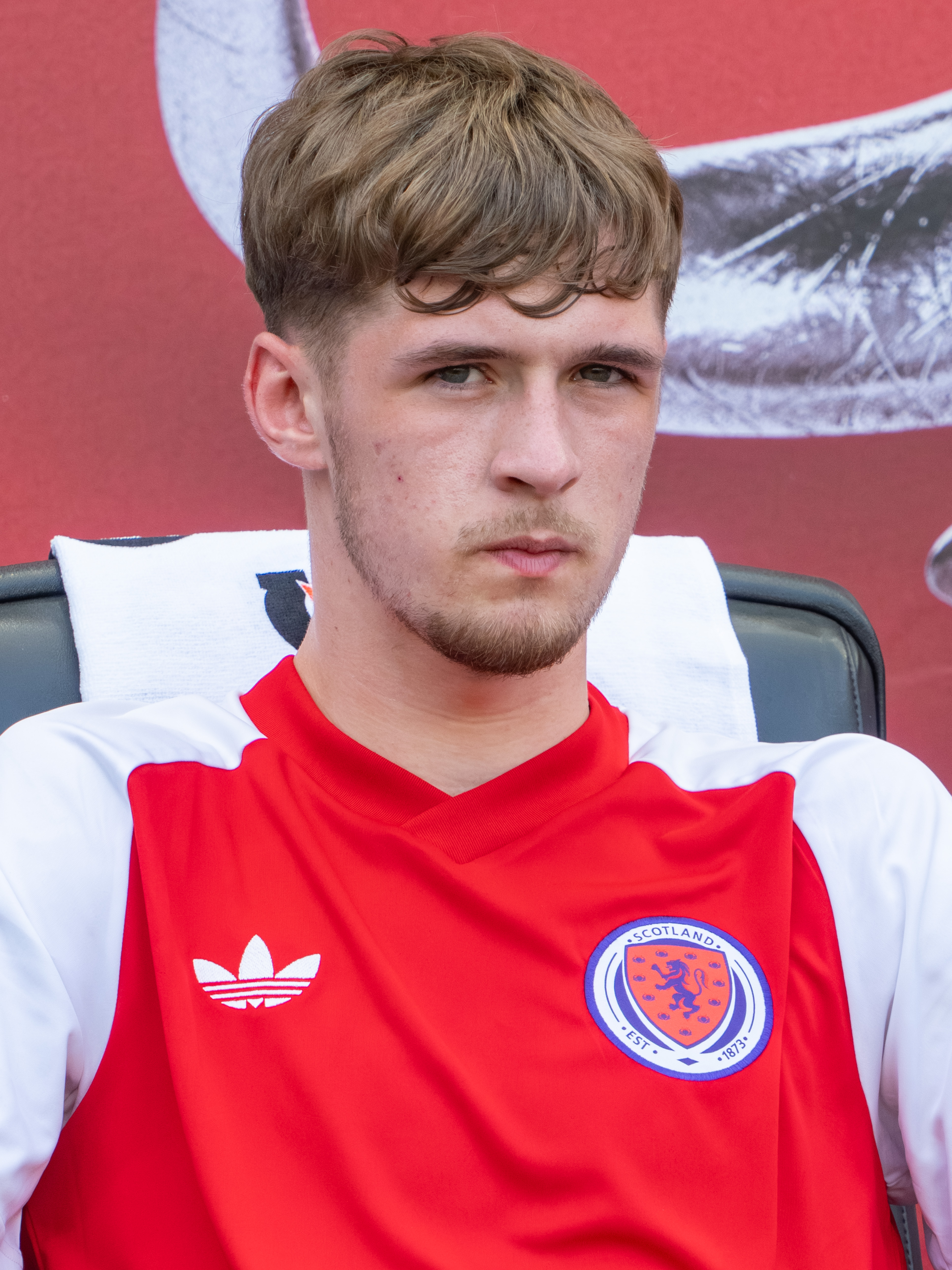
- Fletcher with Scotland in 2026

Personal information
- Full name: Tyler Robert Fletcher
- Date of birth: 19 March 2007 (age 19)
- Place of birth: Manchester, England
- Height: 6 ft 0 in (1.83 m)
- Position: Midfielder

Team information
- Current team: Manchester United
- Number: 39

Youth career
- –2023: Manchester City
- 2023–2026: Manchester United

Senior career*
Years	Team	Apps	(Gls)
2026–	Manchester United	2	(0)

International career^{‡}
2022–2023	England U16	3	(0)
2023	Scotland U16	7	(0)
2023	Scotland U17	3	(0)
2025	Scotland U18	1	(0)
2024–	Scotland U19	10	(1)
2026–	Scotland U21	5	(1)
2026–	Scotland	2	(0)
- * Club domestic league appearances and goals as of 20:16, 24 May 2026 (UTC) ‡ National team caps and goals as of 03:19, 22 November 2026 (UTC)

Tyler Robert Fletcher (born 19 March 2007) is a professional footballer who plays as a midfielder for Premier League club Manchester United. Born in England, he represents the Scotland national team.

He joined Manchester United's youth system in 2023, from Manchester City. He made his first-team debut for United in February 2026. Fletcher is the son of Darren Fletcher and the twin brother of Jack Fletcher. He has represented both England and Scotland at youth international level. He made his senior international debut for Scotland in May 2026 and was also named as a late replacement in their 2026 FIFA World Cup squad.

== Club career ==
Fletcher, and his twin brother Jack, were part of the academy at Manchester City for nine years prior to agreeing to sign for Manchester United for a combined fee of £1.25 million in July 2023. He signed his first professional contract with the club in April 2024, shortly after his 17th birthday.

Fletcher made his Premier League debut as a second-half substitute in a 2–0 home win against Tottenham Hotspur on 7 February 2026. With his brother Jack also making his debut for the club that season, it marked the first time that a set of twins and their father had all played in the English top flight. In May 2026, he won the Denzil Haroun Reserve Team Player of the Year award.

== International career ==
Fletcher is eligible to represent Scotland, England, and the Republic of Ireland at international level. He has represented England at under-16 level, and Scotland at under-16, under-17, under-18, under-19, under-21 and senior levels.

He played for both England and Scotland at under-16 level, representing Scotland as his father did, and England, as his brother Jack did. In October 2023, he confirmed his decision to represent Scotland. In 2025, he captained Scotland at under-18 level. He was included in the Scotland under-21 squad for the first time in March 2026.

Fletcher was one of four young players invited to train with the Scotland squad ahead of the 2026 World Cup, and he made his senior international debut in a friendly against Curaçao on 30 May 2026. Billy Gilmour suffered a knee injury during the game, ruling him out of the tournament, with Fletcher being announced as his replacement the following day.

== Personal life ==
He is the son of ex Scotland international Darren Fletcher and the twin brother of professional footballer Jack Fletcher.

== Career statistics ==
=== Club ===
As of match played 24 May 2026

Appearances and goals by club, season and competition
Club	Season	League			National cup		League cup		Europe		Other		Total	
Club	Season	Division	Apps	Goals	Apps	Goals	Apps	Goals	Apps	Goals	Apps	Goals	Apps	Goals
Manchester United U21	2025–26	—			—		—		—		3 (Note: Appearances in EFL Trophy)	0	3	0
Manchester United	2025–26	Premier League	2	0	0	0	0	0	—		—		2	0
Manchester United	2026–27	Premier League	0	0	0	0	0	0	0	0	—		0	0
Manchester United	Total		2	0	0	0	0	0	0	0	—		2	0
Career total			2	0	0	0	0	0	0	0	3	0	5	0

=== International ===
As of match played 6 June 2026

Appearances and goals by national team and year
National team	Year	Apps	Goals
Scotland	2026	2	0
Total		2	0

== Honours ==
Individual

- Denzil Haroun Reserve Team Player of the Year: 2025/26
