= Peter Coates =

English businessman (born 1938)

- Born: 13 January 1938 (age 88); Goldenhill, Stoke-on-Trent, England
- Occupations: Director of Stoke City F.C. Shareholder of bet365
- Spouse: Deirdre
- Children: 4, including Denise Coates and John Coates

Peter Coates (born 13 January 1938) is an English businessman, the co-founder of bet365, and director of Stoke City Football Club, of which he is former chairman. He has been listed as the 25th-richest person in British football. He founded Stadia Catering in the 1960s and Signal Radio in 1983.

== Early life ==
Peter Coates was born in Goldenhill, Stoke-on-Trent, the youngest of 14 children. He was brought up by his sister, Irene, after his mother died when he was two. His father, Leonard was a miner and World War I veteran who had a keen interest in football, where they regularly attended Stoke City's Victoria Ground. Coates signed for the club on amateur terms in the 1950s, but admitted he was "not quite good enough" to make it as a professional; instead he went on to play for local non-league sides Goldenhill Wanderers and Kidsgrove Athletic. He stopped playing football at the age of 23.

== Career ==
=== Early career ===
Coates left school at age fourteen to work in an office to help his family make ends meet. This lasted until he was old enough to join the Parachute Regiment for his National Service. After leaving the army he took a job with the Wimpy restaurant chain, eventually rising to the position of regional manager. Using his restaurant background as a springboard, Coates founded Stadia Catering. Their speciality was catering events at football grounds, and they would eventually merge with competitor Lindley Catering. He used the increase in revenue to purchase a chain of betting shops that he dubbed Provincial Racing. He also founded the local radio station Signal 1 in 1983.

=== bet365 ===
bet365 was founded in 2000 in a portakabin in Stoke-on-Trent by the Coates family, led by his daughter Denise. Denise Coates developed a sports betting platform and trading team to launch the business online in March 2001. The business borrowed £15 million from RBS against the family's betting shop estate which had been started by Peter Coates in 1974. bet365 sold its betting shop chain in 2005 for £40 million and paid off its loan to RBS. bet365 has grown into one of the world's largest online gambling companies, with its reported figures to March 2010 showing amounts wagered on sports at £5.4 billion, revenues of £358 million, and an operating profit of £104 million. Peter Coates holds the position of chairman of bet365. Denise Coates, joint chief executive, continues to run bet365 with her brother, John.

=== Stoke City ===
==== First period (1986–1998) ====
In 1986, Peter Coates became majority shareholder at Stoke City and was appointed chairman in September 1986 taking over from Sandy Clubb. The club had been through a tough period with poor finances and a humiliating relegation in 1984–85. Coates backed Mick Mills in 1986–87 for a promotion push but they fell short and Mills had to sell players before making additions. In preparation for the 1989–90 season Stoke spent a combined £1million on new players with a then club record of £480,000 for Ian Cranson. However results were appalling and the team finished bottom of the table and fell into the third tier. In 1990 the Stoke City board consisted of six directors and it was agreed that a new share issue was needed, with the majority wanting the supporters to be free to purchase. Following disagreements regarding this share issue, several board members left and the board then consisted of Peter Coates, Keith Humphreys and David Edwards.

Coates appointed Lou Macari for the 1991–92 season and he guided the club to the Second Division title and victory in the 1992 Associate Members' Cup Final. Supporters were dismayed with the board after Mark Stein was sold to Chelsea in October 1993 for £1.4 million and shortly after Macari left to join Celtic. Macari returned to Stoke the following season and the side nearly gained promotion in 1995–96 losing to Leicester City in the play-offs. The board decided to move to a new all-seater-stadium following the 1996–97 season after deciding it would be too costly to upgrade the Victoria Ground to meet the Taylor Report. The first season at the new Britannia Stadium was a disaster for the club as unexpectedly Macari left and was replaced by his assistant Chic Bates. Coates was coming in for a lot of criticism from supporters for his lack of spending and after an embarrassing 7–0 defeat at home to Birmingham City on 10 January 1998 around 2,000 angry supporters invaded the pitch at full-time and some attempted to enter the directors box. After more fan protests Coates resigned as chairman although he remained a majority shareholder, whilst Keith Humphreys was appointed chairman as Stoke were relegated to the Second Division.

In 1999, a group of Icelandic businessmen formed a consortium to buy the club led by Gunnar Gíslason. The consortium Stoke Holding paid around £3.5 million. The deal was completed on 15 November 1999. The Icelandic consortium eventually took Stoke back the First Division via the play-offs in 2002 and consolidated the club in mid-table but were unable to mount a promotion attempt. The consortium made one last effort to gain promotion in the 2005–06 season after sacking Tony Pulis and replacing him with Johan Boskamp. He brought in a large number of foreign players and ultimately only managed a mid-table finish and the owners left at the end of the season.

==== Second period (2006–present) ====
The Coates family through a bet365 subsidiary company completed the purchase of Stoke City F.C. for £1.7 million. Coates later stated the Icelandic consortium had left the club in a "mess" with debts of around £9 million. Coates re-appointed Tony Pulis as manager ahead of the 2006–07 season and the team almost made it to the play-offs. They did achieve promotion to the Premier League in 2007–08 finishing in 2nd place. Stoke secured survival in 2008–09 despite being favorites for relegation. Stoke broke their transfer record in August 2010, paying Sunderland £8 million for Kenwyne Jones. Stoke reached their first FA Cup Final in 2010–11, losing 1–0 to Manchester City. Stoke again broke their transfer record in 2011–12 spending £10 million on Peter Crouch. Supporters began to get frustrated with the style of football played under Pulis in 2012–13 and so Coates replaced him with Mark Hughes. The style of football improved under Hughes and Stoke enjoyed a good period finishing ninth three seasons running in 2013–14, 2014–15 and 2015–16.

Problems began to emerge however as Hughes began to move on the longer serving players and replace them with his own with £18 million spent on Giannelli Imbula in February 2015 and Kevin Wimmer in August 2017 with both making little impact of the team. Coates came in for criticism from supporters in December 2017 with the team in deep relegation trouble and pressure mounting on Hughes, He dismissed the fans concerns with— "I don't know what all the fuss is about". He sacked Hughes soon after and replaced him with Paul Lambert who was unable to keep Stoke in the Premier League. Gary Rowett was appointed manager going into the 2018–19 season and despite spending over £30 million on new players he was unable to mount a promotion bid and was sacked in January 2019 and replaced with Nathan Jones. Stoke made a poor start to the 2019–20 season and were cut adrift at the bottom of the table by November before Jones was dismissed. Northern Ireland manager Michael O'Neill was brought in and he was able to guide Stoke to Championship survival. In September 2020 his son John Coates was appointed as joint-chairman. John took outright control of Stoke in August 2024 with Peter becoming director.

== Political activity ==
Coates has been a significant Labour Party donor, although he did not donate to the party while Jeremy Corbyn was leader. During the 2020 Labour leadership election, he donated £25,000 to Keir Starmer's successful campaign.

== Personal life ==
Coates's father, Leonard was a miner and fought in World War I with the York and Lancaster Regiment where he was awarded a Military Medal. In December 2014 it was announced that Leonard would have a street named after him in Stoke-on-Trent. Coates was awarded honorary degrees from Staffordshire University in 2008, and Keele University in 2011.

Speaking at the Football Governance Inquiry in March 2011, he said: "I am a Stoke boy, I have supported the club since I was a boy and I have had two comings at Stoke – an early one in 1985, after which I sold the club to an Icelandic consortium and then bought it back again about five years ago this summer. I bought it back again against my better judgment, in some ways, and my family's, who all thought I was daft to do it. The club was in a mess at the time and I thought I could help it and do things for it, and I was a bit disappointed with my previous time, and there was a little bit of unfinished business about it and all that sort of thing. But I thought it would be important for the area if the football club were doing well. Stoke was having a difficult time. It has lost the pot banks and the mining industry. I thought that if Stoke could get in the Premier League it would give the place a lift and would be good for it. I think that that has happened, I am pleased to say."
