= Denise Coates =

English businesswoman (born 1967)

Denise Coates CBE
- Born: 26 September 1967 (age 58)
- Education: University of Sheffield
- Occupation: Businesswoman
- Known for: Founder and joint CEO, bet365
- Spouse: Richard Smith
- Children: 5
- Parent: Peter Coates
- Relatives: John Coates (brother)

Denise Coates CBE (born 26 September 1967) is a British businesswoman. She is the founder, majority shareholder and joint chief executive of online gambling company, bet365. She is one of the highest paid executives in the UK and the highest paid female executive. In September 2026, Coates' estimated net worth was USD $8.1 billion.

== Early life ==
Denise Coates was born the eldest daughter of Peter Coates, chairman of Stoke City F.C. and a director of Bet365. She attended Sandbach High School in the 1980s and spent time working as a cashier in her father's betting shop. She earned a first-class degree in econometrics from the University of Sheffield.

== Career ==
=== Early career ===
While at school, Coates started work in the cashiers' department of Provincial Racing, a bookmaking firm owned by her family. After leaving university, she continued to work at Provincial Racing, as an accountant. Following this, Coates became managing director over the small chain of shops in 1995. That same year, Coates obtained a loan from Barclays to acquire a neighbouring chain.

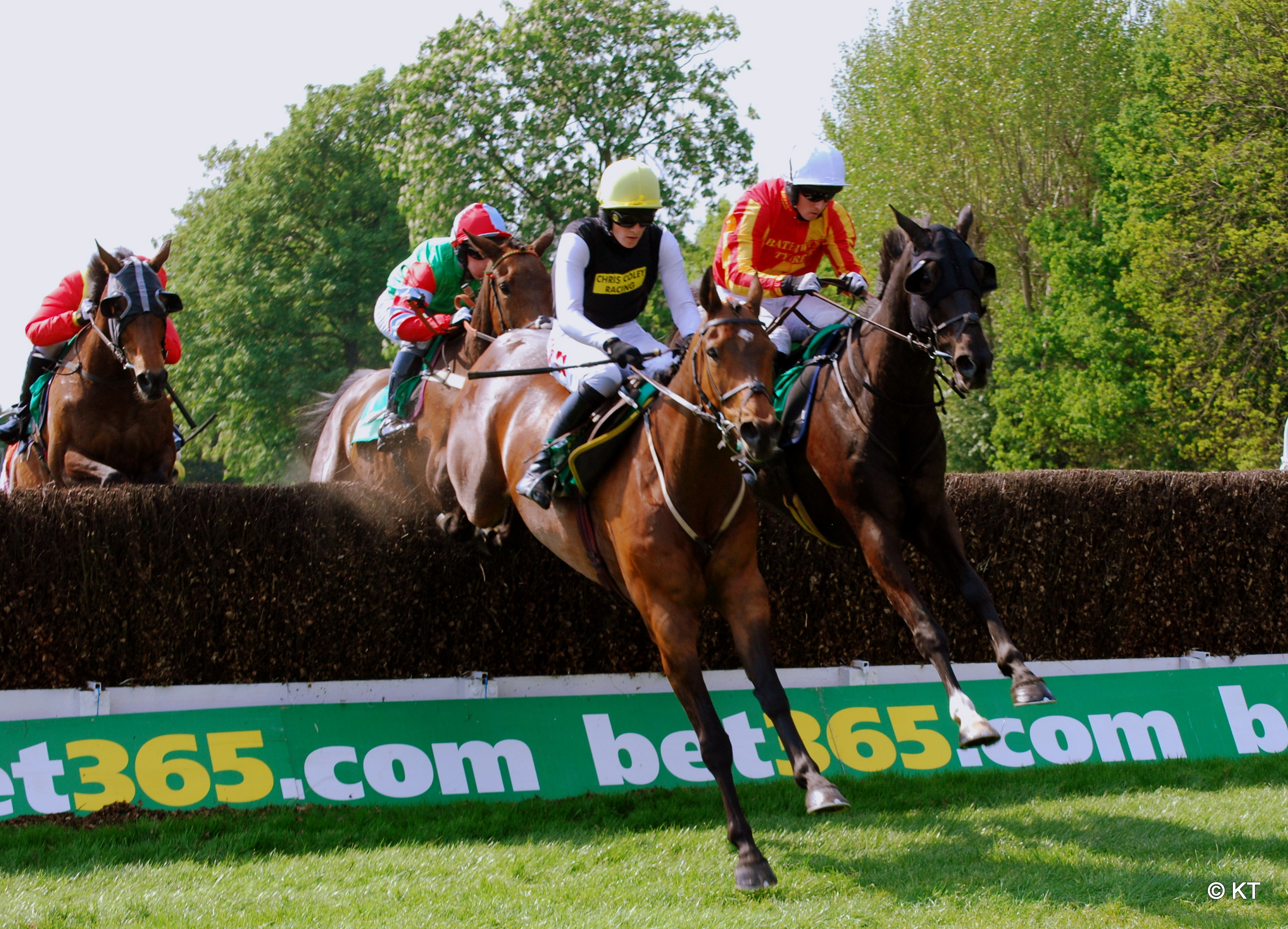
Bet365 Gold Cup at Sandown in April 2011

=== Bet365 ===
Coates purchased the domain name Bet365.com in April 2000. Bet365.com was launched in 2001 as an online betting site. The business borrowed £15 million from RBS against the family's betting shop estate. In 2005, these shops were sold to Coral for £40 million, which allowed Coates to pay off the loan to RBS.

As of 2016, Bet365 is one of the world's largest online gambling companies, with $2 billion in revenues and facilitating $45 billion in yearly bets. The company also owns a majority stake in Stoke City Football Club. In 2015, Bet365 moved its headquarters from Stoke to Gibraltar because of its favourable regulations. Coates still runs the company alongside her brother, and co-CEO, John Coates.

Coates owns around half of Bet365. She is unusual amongst high-net-worth individuals in taking the majority of her income as salary rather than dividends. In 2018 she was the highest paid woman in the world. She was the highest taxpayer in Britain from 2019–2022. In 2017, Coates was criticised for paying herself £217 million, with Mike Dixon, CEO of Addaction, saying "It cannot be right that the CEO of a betting company is paid 22 times more than the whole industry 'donates' to treatment." In 2018, it was announced that her salary had increased to £265 million, around 9,500 times more than the average UK salary, with Luke Hildyard of the High Pay Centre commenting, "There is an increasing perception that big business only serves the interests of an elite few – a billionaire taking hundreds of millions more from a company that profits, in part, from other people's addictions does nothing to dispel that perception." Her salary of £421 million in 2020 was 50% higher than it was in 2019, and higher than all FTSE 100 Index CEOs combined.

== Denise Coates Foundation ==
Coates set up the Bet365 Foundation in August 2012. In February 2016 it was renamed Denise Coates Foundation. It is a registered charity under English law and it donated £100 million to 20 UK charities as of 2014. In 2022 the charity donated £1 million to help families in Ukraine.

Charities which have received funds include Oxfam, CAFOD, the Douglas Macmillan Hospice for cancer sufferers in Stoke, and relief programmes for victims caught in the aftermath of Typhoon Haiyan in the Philippines. University scholarships and theatre donations have also been offered.

The Foundation pledged £230,000 to St Joseph's College, in Trent Vale, for the school's work to help support vulnerable young people in Bo, Sierra Leone.

In March 2020 a donation of £235,000 was made by the foundation to The New Vic Theatre in Newcastle-under-Lyme for essential refurbishment and redevelopment.

In April 2020, Coates donated £10 million through her foundation to University Hospitals of North Midlands to support staff fighting coronavirus.

== Personal life ==
Coates is married to Richard Smith, and they live in Betchton near Sandbach, Cheshire. She drives an Aston Martin with personalised number plates bearing her initials.

They have five children, four of whom were reported in March 2014 as being "recently adopted from the same family".

Coates lives in a £90 million mansion in Cheshire, which includes an Olympic-sized swimming pool, two helicopters, and a custom-built water slide for her children. The property also includes tennis courts, a boathouse, and landscaped gardens.

Coates is one of the UK's highest taxpayers. In February 2026, Coates and family were listed in 5th place on the Sunday Times Tax list, paying £227.1 million in tax.

=== Wealth and salary ===
As of September 2026, Forbes estimates Coates' net worth at USD $8.1 billion. In 2020, she earned a salary of £422 million and dividends of £48 million. As of 2021, she has been the highest paid chief executive in Britain for several years, and is one of the wealthiest women in Britain, according to the Sunday Times Rich list.

In December 2025, it was reported that Coates was paid £281 million in 2024–2025 by bet365, which was made up of a salary of £104 million and a majority share of a £354 million dividend.

== Honours and awards ==
In January 2012, Coates was appointed a Commander of the Order of the British Empire (CBE) for services to the community and business. In 2012, she received an honorary doctorate from Staffordshire University.

In 2013, Coates was named as one of the 100 most powerful women in the UK by Woman's Hour on BBC Radio 4.

In 2019, Coates was inducted to the Sports Betting Hall of Fame run by Sports Betting Community (SBC) for her leadership in the gambling industry.
