= Sandbach High School and Sixth Form College =

Girl's secondary education academy school based in Sandbach, Cheshire

Coordinates: 53.146°N 2.374°W

Sandbach High School
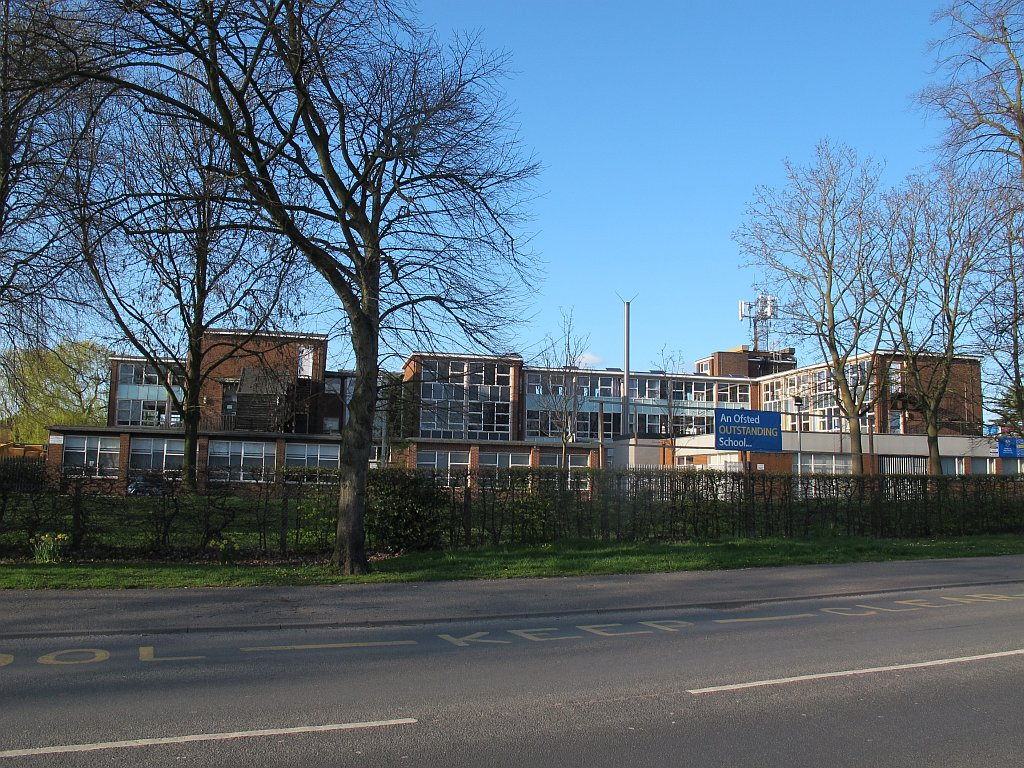
- Sandbach High School (2016)

Location
- Middlewich Road; Sandbach, Cheshire; England

Information
- Type: Academy
- Local authority: Cheshire East
- Trust: The Saxon Crosses MAT
- Department for Education URN: 136340 Tables
- Ofsted: Reports
- Chair: Andrew Cliffe
- Head teacher: Ellen Walton
- Gender: Girls
- Age: 11 to 18
- Enrolment: 1396 pupils sixth form pupils: 320
- Colours: Blue, Yellow, White, Grey
- Former Pupils: Old Sandbachians
- Website: http://www.sandhigh.cheshire.sch.uk/

Sandbach High School is a girls secondary school and sixth form with academy status located in Sandbach, Cheshire. The school is located on 10 acres (440,000 sq ft) of grounds on Middlewich Road near the town centre.

The school was judged as "Outstanding" by the government inspectorate Ofsted in 2008, and was judged to have retained its Ofsted rating in November 2017. In 2016, the school was ranked in the top 50 schools in the United Kingdom by The Sunday Times Good School Guide.

== Notable pupils ==
- Mia Brookes, snowboarder.
- Denise Coates, founder and joint CEO of Bet365
- Rowan Cheshire, freestyle skier
