= Darren Fletcher =

Scottish footballer (born 1984)

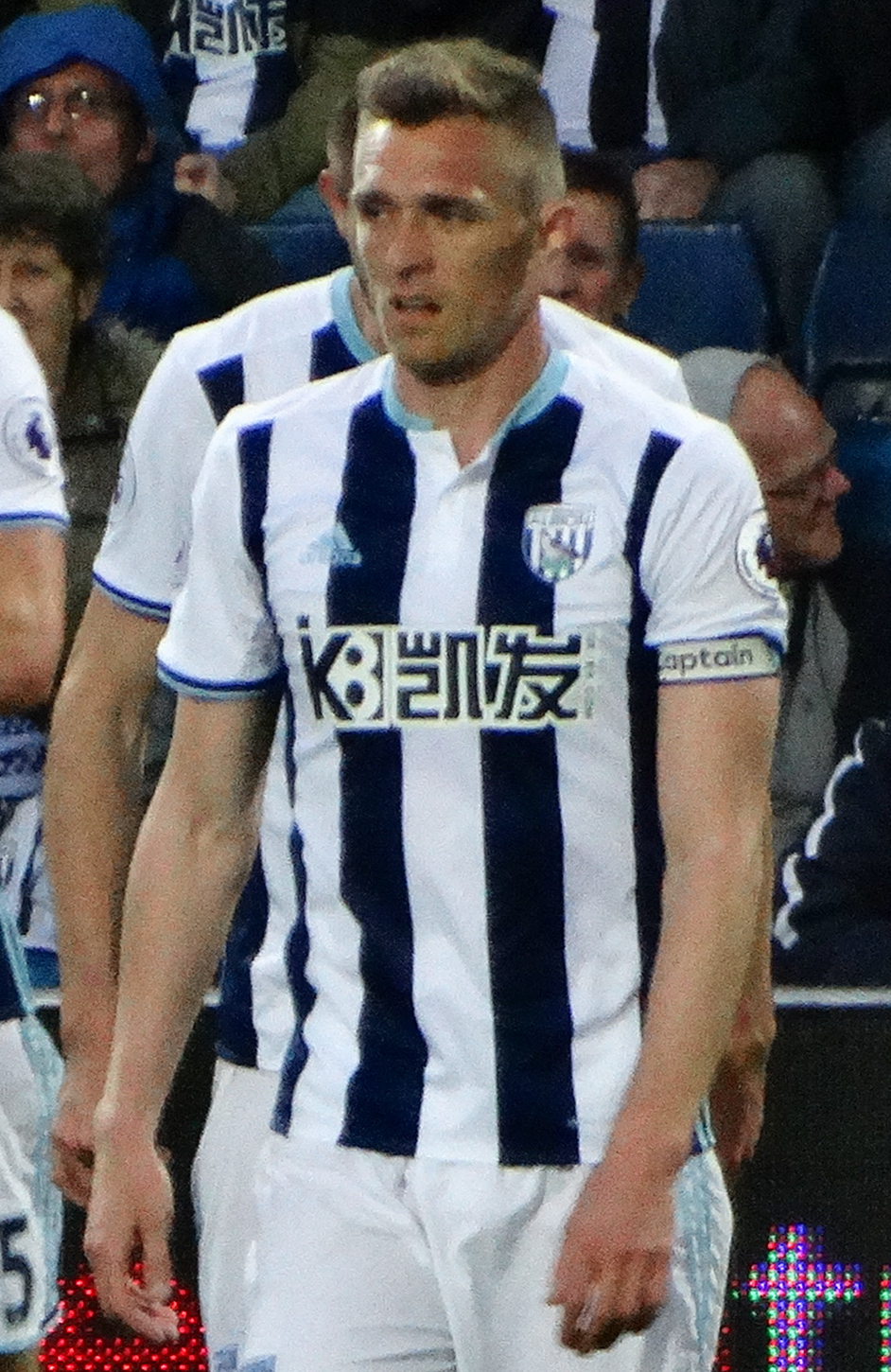
- Fletcher with West Bromwich Albion in 2017

Personal information
- Full name: Darren Barr Fletcher
- Date of birth: 1 February 1984 (age 42)
- Place of birth: Mayfield, Midlothian, Scotland
- Height: 6 ft 0 in (1.83 m)
- Position: Midfielder

Team information
- Current team: Manchester United U18 (head coach)

Youth career
- Hutchison Vale
- Tynecastle Boys Club
- Celtic Boys Club
- 1995–2003: Manchester United

Senior career*
Years	Team	Apps	(Gls)
2002–2015	Manchester United	223	(18)
2015–2017	West Bromwich Albion	91	(4)
2017–2019	Stoke City	38	(2)
Total		352	(24)

International career
2002	Scotland U20	2	(2)
2002–2003	Scotland U21	4	(0)
2003	Scotland B	1	(0)
2003–2017	Scotland	80	(5)

Managerial career
- 2026: Manchester United (caretaker)
- * Club domestic league appearances and goals

Darren Barr Fletcher (born 1 February 1984) is a Scottish professional football coach and former player who is currently the head coach of Manchester United Under-18s. He also served as caretaker head coach of the Manchester United first team in early January 2026. Fletcher spent the majority of his playing career at United, winning 13 trophies including five Premier League titles and the UEFA Champions League. He mostly played as a central midfielder, but began his career as a right winger and also featured occasionally in defence.

Fletcher came through the ranks of Manchester United's Academy and spent 20 years with United, making 342 appearances for the club. With them, he won five Premier Leagues, one FA Cup, two League Cups, four FA Community Shields, the FIFA Club World Cup and the UEFA Champions League. Fletcher was included in the PFA Premier League Team of the Year for 2009–10. He was named vice-captain in his last season with the club. He joined West Bromwich Albion in February 2015, where he made 97 appearances. After leaving Albion in 2017, Fletcher had a two-year stint with Stoke City. He returned to Manchester United in a coaching capacity in October 2020, working with the club's under-16s players, before being appointed to the first team in January 2021. In March 2021, he became technical director at Manchester United.

Fletcher made his full international debut for Scotland in 2003, and scored his first international goal on his second appearance. The following year, he played a match as the team's youngest captain for over a century. After Barry Ferguson was banned from international football because of a breach of regulations, Fletcher was given the captaincy on a full-time basis in August 2009. In total he won 80 caps and scored 5 goals for Scotland.

The middle of Fletcher's career was disrupted by an extended break from football due to health problems caused by ulcerative colitis. Between November 2011 and December 2013, he played only ten times for his club, undergoing an operation in early 2013 to lessen the effects of the condition after a failed return in September 2012.

== Early life ==
Fletcher was born in Dalkeith and raised in Mayfield near Edinburgh. He was educated at St Luke's RC Primary School and St David's RC High School in Dalkeith. He is of Irish descent through his mother who hails from Achill Island.

== Club career ==
=== Manchester United ===
==== Early years ====
Fletcher played his youth football at Hutchison Vale, Tynecastle Boys Club and Celtic Boys Club before being scouted by Manchester United. He first joined the Manchester United youth setup at the age of 11, and then signed with the club when he was aged 15. Fletcher said in 2020 that he had almost signed for Newcastle United instead, as some people advised him it would be harder to break into the Manchester United first team.

He progressed quickly with Manchester United, and could have become the youngest player ever to appear in their first team when he was selected in their squad for the final fixture of the 1999–2000 FA Premier League season, against Aston Villa on 14 May 2000. This plan was stymied as Premier League rules prohibited players on schoolboy contracts from appearing at the senior level, and his debut was delayed. He had been part of the reserve team that won the Manchester Senior Cup in 1999–2000. Fletcher was initially seen as a right midfielder, similar to David Beckham, and was tipped by many to break into the first-team with ease and stay there for many years to come. As he developed he came to be viewed more as a central midfielder.

Over the next couple of seasons, Fletcher's involvement was limited due to various injuries, including a broken foot. Nevertheless, by the 2002–03 season, he had become a regular member of the reserve team, and after several appearances as an unused substitute, he finally made his first-team debut on 12 March 2003 – almost three years behind schedule – starting on the right side of midfield against Basel in the second group stage of the UEFA Champions League. He was substituted for David Beckham after 73 minutes, but a second Champions League appearance followed against Deportivo de La Coruña a week later, and he was named as a substitute for both legs of the quarter-final tie against Real Madrid. For his performances for the reserve team during the 2002–03 season, Fletcher received the Denzil Haroun Reserve Player of the Year award.

==== First-team regular ====
Fletcher broke into the Manchester United team during the 2003–04 season, playing a number of important matches and starting in United's FA Cup Final win over Millwall in May 2004. Despite a slow start to the 2004–05 season, in which in the early part of the season he made very few competitive appearances, Fletcher again broke into the United first-team. On 1 January 2005, Fletcher scored his first goal at club level in a 2–0 win over Middlesbrough.

Fletcher was one of the players singled out for criticism by club captain Roy Keane in the wake of United's 4–1 defeat to Middlesbrough in October 2005. Keane reportedly said, "I can't understand why people in Scotland rave about Darren Fletcher." However, Keane later attempted to set the record straight stating, "If you listen to any of my comments over the last two or three years, if I've given any player credit over the years it would be Fletch. Fletch will tell you that himself." Fletcher went some way towards answering his critics on 6 November 2005, with his performance in the vital league match at home to Chelsea, scoring the only goal of the game with a looping header. His winning goal ended Chelsea's 40-match unbeaten run in the Premier League.

In 2006–07, at the start of the season Fletcher retained a place in the first-team but only on the bench and scored in an away win over Charlton Athletic, as well as scoring the headed winner in the away game with Middlesbrough in December and another headed goal in the home win against Charlton in February, making it a double against the club that season. As the season progressed, Alex Ferguson preferred the midfield quartet of Cristiano Ronaldo, Paul Scholes, Michael Carrick and Ryan Giggs, limiting Fletcher to a few substitute appearances. However, with Scholes absent through suspension, he made a starring appearance in United's 7–1 win over Roma in the Champions League quarter-final.

In the 2007–08 season, with the arrival at the club of fellow central midfielders Owen Hargreaves and Anderson and winger Nani, Fletcher played even less than he did during the previous season. As before, Ferguson preferred Carrick, Scholes, Giggs and Ronaldo to him in midfield, and got even less playing time than the new arrivals. He did, however, put in some stalwart performances when given the chance, including two goals in the 4–0 defeat of Arsenal at Old Trafford in the FA Cup fourth round. Fletcher picked up a Champions League winner's medal but was an unused substitute in the final.

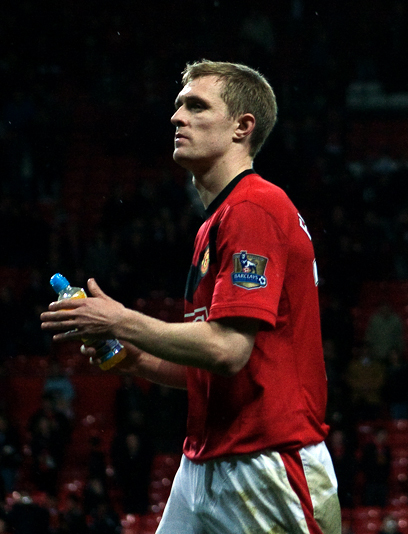
Fletcher with Manchester United in 2009

In the 2008–09 season, Fletcher started the first two games, due to injuries to Carrick and Ronaldo, and scored against Newcastle United at Old Trafford in United's first Premier League match of the season, forcing a 1–1 draw after Obafemi Martins' goal. Fletcher notched his second goal of the season opening the scoring from close range against Portsmouth, following a pass from Patrice Evra. He was later shown a yellow card on the 93rd minute before the match ended 1–0. On 3 October 2008, Fletcher signed a three-year extension to his contract with United, keeping him at the club until 2012. Fletcher notched his third goal of the season against Everton on 25 October. He then scored in the Club World Cup semi-final against Gamba Osaka on 18 December after coming off the bench.

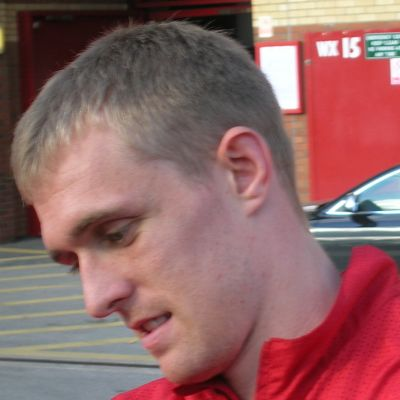
Fletcher in September 2009

In the Champions League semi-final second leg against Arsenal on 5 May 2009, Fletcher was sent off, ruling him out of the Champions League Final. Manchester United appealed to UEFA to have the red card overturned on compassionate grounds on 7 May 2009, but this was rejected on 11 May. Then-Inter Milan coach José Mourinho commented on his absence: "Fletcher is more important than people think ... he 'eats' opponents in defensive transition. I believe Xavi and Andrés Iniesta are happy Fletch is not playing."

The 2009–10 season saw Fletcher consolidate his place in the heart of the United midfield, starting all of United's important games. He opened his scoring account for the season with a double in the first Manchester derby of the season, a memorable 4–3 victory for United, twice putting United ahead before Michael Owen scored in the sixth minute of added time. He won the Man of the Match award for his performance. On 21 November 2009, Fletcher scored his third of the season, hitting a half volley from the edge of the area into the top corner giving United a 1–0 lead against Everton in a 3–0 win. This season also saw Fletcher and fellow midfielders Michael Carrick and Park Ji-sung deputise in defence due to an injury crisis that left Patrice Evra being the only fit regular in defence. They still managed to keep a clean sheet against West Ham United and concede only one goal against Bundesliga champions Wolfsburg in the Champions League. Fletcher was sent off during the match against Birmingham City on 9 January 2010 after two bookable offences. On 10 March, he scored the fourth goal in a 4–0 win in the second leg of United's last 16 Champions League tie with AC Milan, making the score 7–2 on aggregate. Following this, Fletcher captained United for the first time in the league match against West Ham and was later confirmed as United's vice-captain, a position he held until December 2014. In April, Fletcher capped a successful season with selection in the PFA Premier League Team of the Year. On 9 May, the last day of the season, Fletcher scored the first goal of a 4–0 win at home to Stoke City.

==== Later years and illness ====
Fletcher made his first start of the 2011–12 season in United's first group stage match on 14 September 2011 in the Champions League away at Benfica, which ended in a 1–1 draw. This was Fletcher's first start for a number of months after being sidelined towards the end of the 2010–11 season with illness, revealed in December 2011 to be ulcerative colitis. He made his first Premier League appearance of the season four days later in a 3–1 home win against title rivals Chelsea. Fletcher maintained his place in centre midfield in the following Premier League games against Stoke and Norwich City. On 23 October, he scored the consolation goal in a 6–1 defeat to local rivals Manchester City, with a curling shot into the top corner.

Fletcher made his 300th career appearance for Manchester United on 5 November in a 1–0 home win against Sunderland. Fletcher scored United's second goal in a 2–2 draw with Benfica on 22 November in the Champions League. He met Patrice Evra's cross at the first attempt, which the goalkeeper got a hand to and he followed it up on the second attempt to score. Following this match, he announced that he would be taking an extended break from football following medical advice about his ongoing ulcerative colitis. He did not play again in the 2011–12 season.

On 14 August 2012, Fletcher came on as a second-half substitute, taking the captain's armband, for Manchester United against Aberdeen in Neil Simpson's testimonial. He played his first competitive match in ten months, coming on as a substitute for Paul Scholes in the 78th minute in Manchester United's 1–0 win over Galatasaray at Old Trafford in the Champions League. On 24 November, Fletcher scored his first goal since his illness, a header from a Wayne Rooney corner against Queens Park Rangers. On 17 January 2013, it was announced that Fletcher had undergone surgery aimed at resolving his condition, which would rule him out for the remainder of the season. The statement stressed that this was a "planned procedure undertaken at the optimal time" that required Fletcher to be in good health to be carried out. In his May 2013 retirement speech following his final match at Old Trafford as Manchester United manager, Alex Ferguson wished Fletcher a speedy recovery and return to football. A week later, it was revealed that his surgery had been a success and that Fletcher was on course to return to football in July 2013.

On 15 December 2013, Fletcher made his first appearance for nearly a year when he came on as a substitute for Ryan Giggs in a 3–0 victory over Aston Villa. Another substitute appearance followed in the 2–0 League Cup win against Stoke City on 18 December, and on 26 December 2013, Fletcher made his first league start for 390 days in a 3–2 win away to Hull City. He was named Manchester United vice-captain by Louis van Gaal in August 2014.

=== West Bromwich Albion ===
On 2 February 2015, Fletcher signed for West Bromwich Albion on a free transfer. He made his debut on 8 February 2015 against Burnley, where he was given the captain's armband. He scored his first goal for the club on 11 April 2015 against Leicester City, although the Baggies lost 3–2. Between his debut for West Brom in February 2015 and the international break of October 2015, Fletcher did not miss a minute of Premier League football, marking fully his comeback from several illness-disrupted seasons. He scored his second goal for West Brom on 28 December 2015, in a 1–0 win against Newcastle United. Fletcher had to wait until the 2016–17 season for his next Premier League goal to come. It finally came in a 4–0 win against Burnley on 21 November 2016. He scored his second goal of the 2016–17 season on 21 January 2017, in a 2–0 win against Sunderland. A game against Stoke City, on 4 February 2017, marked his 300th game in the Premier League. Former manager Alex Ferguson hailed him as a "fantastic professional and fantastic human being."

=== Stoke City ===
On 1 June 2017, Fletcher signed a two-year contract with Stoke City, effective from the expiration of his West Bromwich Albion contract on 1 July. He made his debut on 12 August as the team began their season with a 1–0 loss at Everton, playing the full 90 minutes. Local newspaper The Sentinel praised his passing in the match. Fletcher started in the first nine games of the 2017–18 Premier League season for Stoke, extending a streak of consecutive league appearances to 100. He became the eighth outfield player to achieve this mark in the Premier League era. Fletcher scored his first goal for Stoke in a 1–0 win away at Watford on 28 October 2017. Fletcher played 29 times in 2017–18 as Stoke suffered relegation to the EFL Championship.

Fletcher struggled for playing time in 2018–19, making 11 appearances under Gary Rowett and then Nathan Jones. He scored the only goal of the game against Bristol City on 27 October 2018. Fletcher left Stoke at the end of the campaign.

After leaving Stoke, Fletcher began studying for coaching qualifications. He said in November 2019 that he had not officially retired from playing, and did not yet feel ready to begin a career in management. In May 2020 he acknowledged that he "probably" wouldn't play again, and said that his medical condition (ulcerative colitis) meant that he would be at higher risk from COVID-19.

== International career ==
Fletcher established himself as a regular choice for Scotland during the 2003–04 season. He scored his first goal in a 1–0 win against Lithuania, having come off the bench for only his second cap. His goal took Scotland to the play-offs for UEFA Euro 2004. On 26 May 2004, he captained Scotland to a 1–0 friendly win against Estonia in Tallinn, making him the youngest Scotland captain since 17-year-old John Lambie in 1886. Fletcher scored with a 25-yard strike in a 3–0 win against Slovenia on 12 October 2005.

Fletcher was Scotland's vice-captain under Alex McLeish, deputising in the absence of regular captain Barry Ferguson. Fletcher was named as full-time captain in November 2009 when Ferguson was banned from international football for misbehaviour.

Fletcher earned his 50th cap in September 2010, in a UEFA Euro 2012 qualifying match against Liechtenstein. His bouts of illness interrupted his international career, which meant that Scott Brown assumed the captaincy. Fletcher was recalled to the international squad for a friendly against Poland in March 2014. He resumed the captaincy in September 2016, after Brown had temporarily retired from international football.

== Coaching career ==
In November 2019, Fletcher said he aspired to a future in management. In October 2020, Fletcher returned to Manchester United to coach the Under-16s, and in January 2021, he was promoted to first-team coach. In March 2021, he became the technical director at Manchester United. He was replaced in this role by Jason Wilcox in April 2024, with United saying that Fletcher would "continue to play a key role in the football leadership team".

In July 2025, Fletcher was appointed as the head coach of the Manchester United Under-18s. Following the sacking of first-team head coach Ruben Amorim in January 2026, Fletcher was named as United's caretaker head coach. He took charge of two matches, a 2–2 draw in the Premier League against Burnley and a 2–1 FA Cup defeat by Brighton & Hove Albion, before Michael Carrick was appointed interim manager. Fletcher then resumed his position with the Under-18 team.

== Style of play ==
Fletcher usually played as central midfielder in a box-to-box role, where he stood out for his physicality, tenacity, intelligence, and work-rate, as well as his energy and defensive ability, namely his tackling and marking. He was capable of playing anywhere in midfield, however, and also played as a right winger, in a holding role, and on occasion in defence; at international level, he also played in a more attacking role, due to his ability to get forward, which earned him comparisons with Steven Gerrard. In 2009, Terry Butcher described Fletcher as a "complete midfielder, a rare all-rounder and although he's a slightly different player to Roy Keane, he can become as great." He likened Fletcher to Bobby Charlton, noting that he "can get games by the scruff of the neck and inject pace and tempo," also adding that "[h]e understands the game, reads it well, is improving all the time and United rely heavily on him." While Fletcher was initially criticised in the media for his poor positional sense, a lack of creativity in his game, and his tendency to give possession away carelessly early on in his career, he underwent a technical and tactical development, which enabled him establish himself successfully in a deeper midfield role, from which he could dictate the tempo of his team's play in midfield with his passing; his playing style in this position was influenced by one of his idols, Fernando Redondo.

In May 2020, former teammate Wayne Rooney cited Fletcher as an important member of the successful 2006–09 United side, describing him as being as "vital" to the team as himself, Cristiano Ronaldo, and Carlos Tevez, and saying he sacrificed his own individual acclaim for the team.

== Personal life ==
Fletcher was born and grew up in Mayfield, Midlothian.

He is the father of twin boys, Jack and Tyler (born 2007), and twin girls (born 2022), with his wife, Hayley Grice. The couple married in early June 2010. Jack and Tyler are both in the Manchester United academy, having transferred from the Manchester City academy in July 2023. They were both selected for the Scotland under-16 squad in August 2022, but later that season Jack was picked by the England under-16 squad and the two brothers played in a match against each other in February 2023. They made their first-team debuts in 2025–26, becoming the first father and twin sons trio to play in the Premier League.

Fletcher was one of many footballers in the Manchester and Liverpool area whose homes were burgled while playing away games; burglars raided his house in February 2009 and held Grice at knifepoint. The incident occurred while Fletcher was in Milan for Manchester United's Champions League fixture against Inter Milan.

Fletcher is involved in a programme to encourage "Deaf Friendly Football" for youngsters. The programme is run by the Manchester United Foundation and the National Deaf Children's Society.

In 2014 Fletcher became an ambassador for the charity Crohn's and Colitis UK after recovering from surgery for ulcerative colitis.

Fletcher abstains from alcohol.

== Career statistics ==
=== Club ===
Appearances and goals by club, season and competition
Club	Season	League			FA Cup		League Cup		Europe		Other		Total	
Club	Season	Division	Apps	Goals	Apps	Goals	Apps	Goals	Apps	Goals	Apps	Goals	Apps	Goals
Manchester United	2002–03	Premier League	0	0	0	0	0	0	2 (Note: Appearances in UEFA Champions League)	0	—		2	0
Manchester United	2003–04	Premier League	22	0	5	0	2	0	6	0	0	0	35	0
Manchester United	2004–05	Premier League	18	3	3	0	3	0	5	0	1 (Note: Appearance in FA Community Shield)	0	30	3
Manchester United	2005–06	Premier League	27	1	3	0	4	0	7	0	—		41	1
Manchester United	2006–07	Premier League	24	3	6	0	1	0	9	0	—		40	3
Manchester United	2007–08	Premier League	16	0	1	2	0	0	6	0	1	0	24	2
Manchester United	2008–09	Premier League	26	3	3	0	1	0	8	0	4 (Note: One appearance in FA Community Shield, one appearance in UEFA Super Cup, two appearances and one goal in FIFA Club World Cup)	1	42	4
Manchester United	2009–10	Premier League	30	4	0	0	3	0	7	1	1	0	41	5
Manchester United	2010–11	Premier League	26	2	2	0	1	0	7	1	1	0	37	3
Manchester United	2011–12	Premier League	8	1	0	0	0	0	2	1	0	0	10	2
Manchester United	2012–13	Premier League	3	1	0	0	2	0	5	0	—		10	1
Manchester United	2013–14	Premier League	12	0	1	0	3	0	2	0	0	0	18	0
Manchester United	2014–15	Premier League	11	0	1	0	0	0	—		—		12	0
Manchester United	Total		223	18	25	2	20	0	66	3	8	1	342	24
West Bromwich Albion	2014–15	Premier League	15	1	—		—		—		—		15	1
West Bromwich Albion	2015–16	Premier League	38	1	3	2	1	0	—		—		42	3
West Bromwich Albion	2016–17	Premier League	38	2	1	0	1	0	—		—		40	2
West Bromwich Albion	Total		91	4	4	2	2	0	—		—		97	6
Stoke City	2017–18	Premier League	27	1	0	0	2	0	—		—		29	1
Stoke City	2018–19	Championship	11	1	0	0	2	0	—		—		13	1
Stoke City	Total		38	2	0	0	4	0	—		—		42	2
Career total			352	24	29	4	26	0	66	3	8	1	481	32

=== International ===
Appearances and goals by national team and year
National team	Year	Apps	Goals
Scotland	2003	4	1
Scotland	2004	9	1
Scotland	2005	7	1
Scotland	2006	7	1
Scotland	2007	7	0
Scotland	2008	6	0
Scotland	2009	7	0
Scotland	2010	6	0
Scotland	2011	5	1
Scotland	2012	3	0
Scotland	2014	5	0
Scotland	2015	3	0
Scotland	2016	7	0
Scotland	2017	3	0
Total		80	5

Scotland score listed first, score column indicates score after each Fletcher goal.

List of international goals scored by Darren Fletcher
No.	Date	Venue	Cap	Opponent	Score	Result	Competition	Ref.
1	11 October 2003	Hampden Park, Glasgow, Scotland	2	Lithuania	1–0	1–0	UEFA Euro 2004 qualification	
2	30 May 2004	Easter Road, Edinburgh, Scotland	8	Trinidad and Tobago	1–0	4–1	Friendly	
3	12 October 2005	Arena Petrol, Celje, Slovenia	20	Slovenia	1–0	3–0	2006 FIFA World Cup qualification	
4	2 September 2006	Celtic Park, Glasgow, Scotland	25	Faroe Islands	1–0	6–0	UEFA Euro 2008 qualification	
5	3 September 2011	Hampden Park, Glasgow, Scotland	55	Czech Republic	2–1	2–2	UEFA Euro 2012 qualification	

== Managerial statistics ==
As of 12 January 2026

Managerial record by team and tenure
Team	Nat.	From	To	Record								Ref.
Team	Nat.	From	To	G	W	D	L	GF	GA	GD	Win %	Ref.
Manchester United (caretaker)	(England)	5 January 2026	12 January 2026	2	0	1	1	3	4	−1	0.00	
Career Total				2	0	1	1	3	4	−1	0.00	

== Honours ==
Manchester United

- Premier League: 2006–07, 2007–08, 2008–09, 2010–11, 2012–13
- FA Cup: 2003–04
- Football League Cup: 2009–10
- FA Community Shield: 2003, 2007, 2008, 2010
- UEFA Champions League: 2007–08
- FIFA Club World Cup: 2008

Scotland U16s

- Victory Shield: 1997–98

Individual

- Denzil Haroun Reserve Player of the Year: 2002–03
- PFA Premier League Team of the Year: 2009–10
- Scottish FA International Roll of Honour inductee: 2010
- West Bromwich Albion Player of the Year: 2015–16

== See also ==
- List of Scotland national football team captains
