= Jack Fletcher (footballer, born 2007) =

English association football player

Personal information
- Full name: Jack Davidson Fletcher
- Date of birth: 19 March 2007 (age 19)
- Place of birth: Manchester, England
- Height: 5 ft 11 in (1.80 m)
- Position: Midfielder

Team information
- Current team: Manchester United
- Number: 38

Youth career
- –2023: Manchester City
- 2023–2025: Manchester United

Senior career*
Years	Team	Apps	(Gls)
2025–	Manchester United	3	(0)

International career^{‡}
2022	England U15	3	(0)
2022	Scotland U16	3	(1)
2023	England U16	7	(0)
2023–2024	England U17	6	(1)
2024–2025	England U18	8	(0)
2025–	England U19	4	(1)
2026–	England U20	2	(0)
- * Club domestic league appearances and goals as of 22:21, 30 December 2025 (UTC) ‡ National team caps and goals as of 19:39, 4 October 2026 (UTC)

Jack Davidson Fletcher (born 19 March 2007) is an English professional footballer who plays as a midfielder for Premier League club Manchester United. He has played youth international football for England up to under-20 level.

== Club career ==
Fletcher and his twin brother Tyler spent nine years as part of the academy at Manchester City prior to signing for Manchester United for a combined fee of £1.25 million in July 2023. In November 2023, Fletcher was invited to train with the Manchester United first-team squad. He signed his first professional contract with the club in April 2024, shortly after his 17th birthday. In August 2024, Fletcher scored twice, including a long-range volley in a 3–2 EFL Trophy victory against Barnsley for the Manchester United under-21 side. He was named in a first-team matchday squad for the first time on 19 October 2024, for a Premier League match against Brentford.

On 21 December 2025, Fletcher made his debut for Manchester United as a 76th-minute substitute in a 2–1 loss to Aston Villa in the Premier League. With his brother Tyler also making his debut for the club that season, it marked the first time that two twins and their father had all played in the English top flight.

On 4 March 2026, Fletcher was given a six-match suspension and fined £1,500 for calling an opponent a "gay boy" while playing in Manchester United U21's 5-2 loss against Barnsley's first team in the EFL Trophy on 21 October.

== International career ==
Fletcher has played youth international football for Scotland at under-16 level and England at under-15, under-16, under-17, under-18, under-19 and under-20 levels.

In April 2022, Fletcher played international football for England at under-15 level. Whilst he chose to represent the nation he was born in, his twin brother Tyler represented Scotland, qualifying through their father Darren. In 2022, Fletcher accepted a call-up to the Scotland under-16 team and played in three games. His twin brother was also in this squad, thus he has both played with and against his brother at international level. He captained the team against Wales.

In February 2023, Fletcher started for England under-16 against Scotland, with his brother playing on the opposing side.

In November 2023, Fletcher scored his first goal for England under-17 in an 8–0 win over Faroe Islands. He was included in England's squad for the 2024 UEFA European Under-17 Championship and started in their quarter-final elimination against Italy.

On 4 September 2024, Fletcher made his England under-18 debut during a 2–2 draw with Portugal at the Lafarge Foot Avenir.

Fletcher made his England under-19 debut on 11 October 2025, during a 4–1 win over Belgium in Marbella. The following month saw Fletcher score his first goal at this age level during a qualifying game against Scotland U19.

== Personal life ==
He is the son of Scottish former international footballer and current Manchester United Under 18s manager, Darren Fletcher, and twin brother of fellow Manchester United youth footballer Tyler Fletcher.

== Career statistics ==
=== Club ===
As of match played 30 December 2025

Appearances and goals by club, season and competition
Club	Season	League			National cup		League cup		Europe		Other		Total	
Club	Season	Division	Apps	Goals	Apps	Goals	Apps	Goals	Apps	Goals	Apps	Goals	Apps	Goals
Manchester United U21	2024–25	—			—		—		—		2 (Note: Appearances in EFL Trophy)	2	2	2
Manchester United U21	2025–26	—			—		—		—		2	1	2	1
Manchester United U21	Total		—		—		—		—		4	3	4	3
Manchester United	2024–25	Premier League	0	0	0	0	0	0	0	0	0	0	0	0
Manchester United	2025–26	Premier League	3	0	0	0	0	0	—		—		3	0
Manchester United	2026–27	Premier League	0	0	0	0	0	0	0	0	—		0	0
Manchester United	Total		3	0	0	0	0	0	0	0	0	0	3	0
Career total			3	0	0	0	0	0	0	0	4	3	7	3
