= Rachid Baldé =

Guinea-Bissau' athlete

Personal information
- Date of birth: 24 February 2000 (age 26)
- Place of birth: Guinea-Bissau
- Height: 1.65 m (5 ft 5 in)
- Position: Midfielder

Team information
- Current team: SV Blau-Weiß Zorbau
- Number: 4

Youth career
- –2012: Povoense
- 2012–2014: Benfica
- 2015: Brentford
- 2016–2018: Stoke City

Senior career*
Years	Team	Apps	(Gls)
2018–2019	Stoke City	0	(0)
2018	→ Curzon Ashton (loan)	1	(0)
2020	Fátima	4	(0)
2020–2021	Sacavenense	3	(0)
2021	Șomuz Fălticeni		
2022–2023	Zimbru	11	(0)
2023	Kastoria 1980		
2023–2024	MSV Pampow	24	(5)
2024–	SV Blau-Weiß Zorbau	0	(0)
- * Club domestic league appearances and goals as of 8 June 2024

Rachid Baldé (born 24 February 2000) is a Bissau-Guinean footballer who plays as a midfielder for German NOFV-Oberliga Süd club SV Blau-Weiß Zorbau.

== Career ==
As a youth player, Baldé joined the youth academy of Portuguese fourth tier side Povoense. In 2012, he joined the youth academy of Benfica in the Portuguese top flight. Following a spell in the Brentford academy, Baldé started his senior career with English second-tier club Stoke City. In 2018, he was sent on loan to Curzon Ashton in the English sixth tier.

In 2020, Baldé signed for Portuguese third-tier team Fátima. In 2021, he signed for Șomuz Fălticeni in the Romanian third tier, where he suffered a knee injury. Before the second half of 2021–22, Baldé signed for Moldovan top flight outfit Zimbru. On 12 March 2022, he debuted for Zimbru during a 2–1 win over Bălți. On 31 January 2023, Balde signed for Greek third-tier team Kastoria 1980.
