= John Coates (businessman) =

English businessman (born 1970)

- Born: John Fitzgerald Coates; January 1970 (age 56)
- Education: Bristol University
- Occupation: Businessman
- Known for: Joint CEO of bet365 Chairman of Stoke City
- Parent: Peter Coates
- Relatives: Denise Coates (sister)

John Fitzgerald Coates (born January 1970), is an English billionaire businessman and joint CEO of the online gambling company bet365 and Chairman of Stoke City.

== Early life ==
John Fitzgerald Coates was born in January 1970, the son of Peter Coates, chairman of Stoke City F.C. and director of Bet365. He attended Bristol University, where he studied law.

== Business career ==
Coates started his career as a lawyer. In 2001, after selling some of their father's betting shops to large bookmaker Coral, his sister convinced him to join her in launching bet365. John and his sister Denise Coates are co-CEOs of UK-based bet365, an online gambling company, of which he owns a quarter. John helped Denise set up the Bet365 Foundation in August 2012 and it has donated £100 million to 20 UK charities to help support projects at home and abroad. Over a decade-long period, the foundation has managed to amass a fund of £730 million but handed out £78 million. As of 2024, the majority of the money given to the foundation, mostly by companies in the Bet365 group, has yet to be distributed.

== Stoke City ==
In July 2015, Coates was appointed as vice-chairman at Stoke City, where his father is chairman. In September 2020, Coates was appointed as joint-chairman alongside his father. He became outright owner of Stoke City in August 2024 following a demerger with bet365.

== Personal life ==
He is married, with two children, and lives in Stoke-on-Trent.
