= Bet365 Stadium =

Football stadium in Staffordshire, England

bet365 Stadium
- The Britannia, The Brit

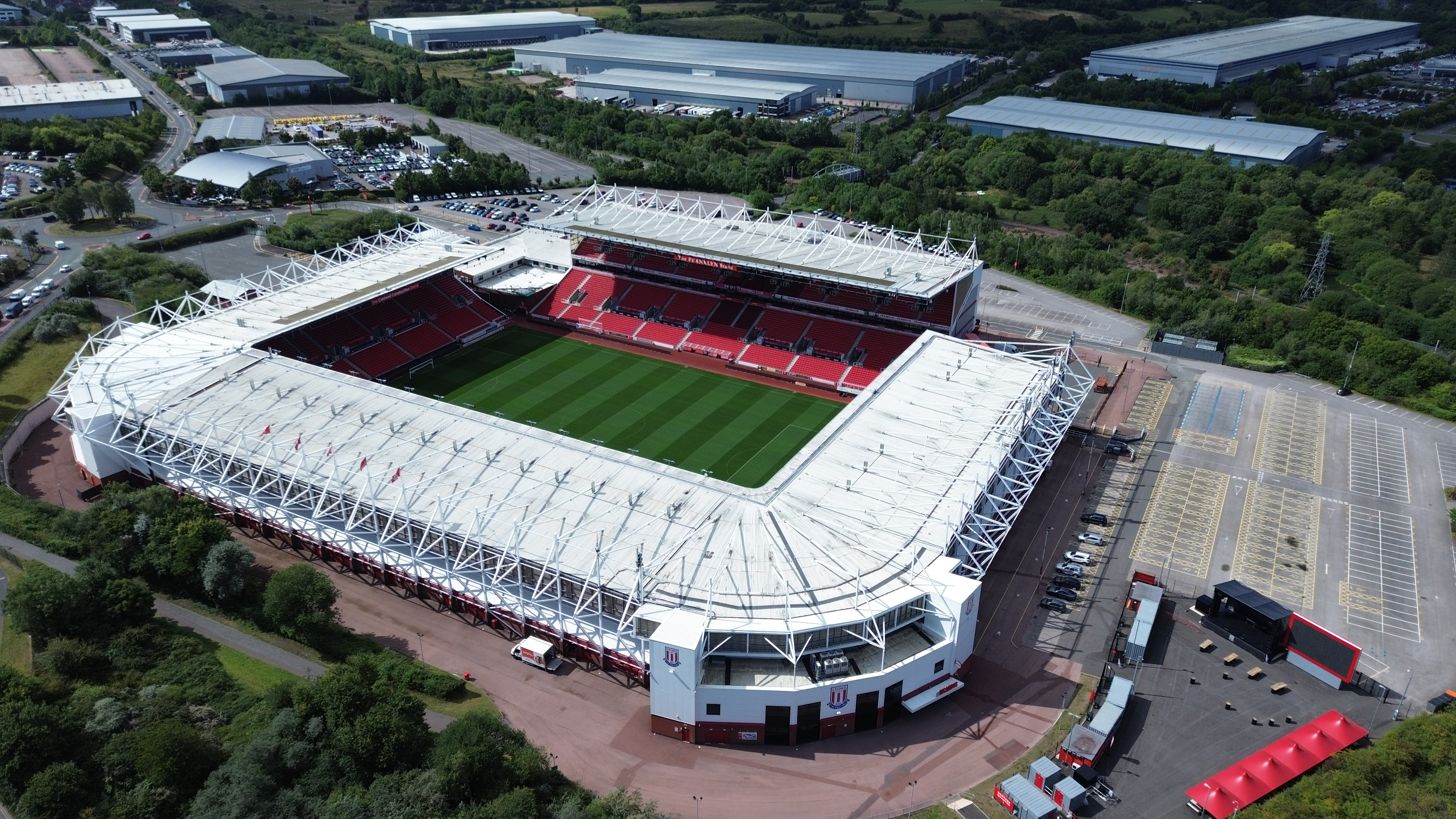
- Interactive map of bet365 Stadium
- Full name: bet365 Stadium
- Former names: Britannia Stadium (1997–2016)
- Location: Stanley Matthews Way; Stoke-on-Trent; England; ST4 4EG
- Coordinates: 52°59′18″N 2°10′32″W
- Owner: Stoke City
- Capacity: 30,089
- Surface: Desso GrassMaster
- Record attendance: 30,027
- Field size: 105 by 68 metres (115 by 74 yd)

Construction
- Built: 1997; 29 years ago
- Opened: 30 August 1997; 29 years ago
- Expanded: 2017; 9 years ago
- Cost: £14.8 million

Tenant
- Stoke City (1997–present)

The bet365 Stadium is an all-seater football stadium in Stoke-on-Trent, Staffordshire, England and the home of EFL Championship club Stoke City. The stadium was previously called the Britannia Stadium but was renamed on 1 June 2016 when the club entered into a new stadium-naming-rights agreement with its parent company, bet365. It has a capacity of 30,089 following the completion of expansion works in 2017.

The stadium was built in 1997 at a cost of £14.8 million as a replacement for the Victoria Ground. Former player Sir Stanley Matthews' ashes were buried beneath the centre circle of the pitch following his death in February 2000; he had officially opened the stadium on 30 August 1997. In European competitions it is known as the Stoke City Stadium due to UEFA regulations on sponsorships.

== History ==
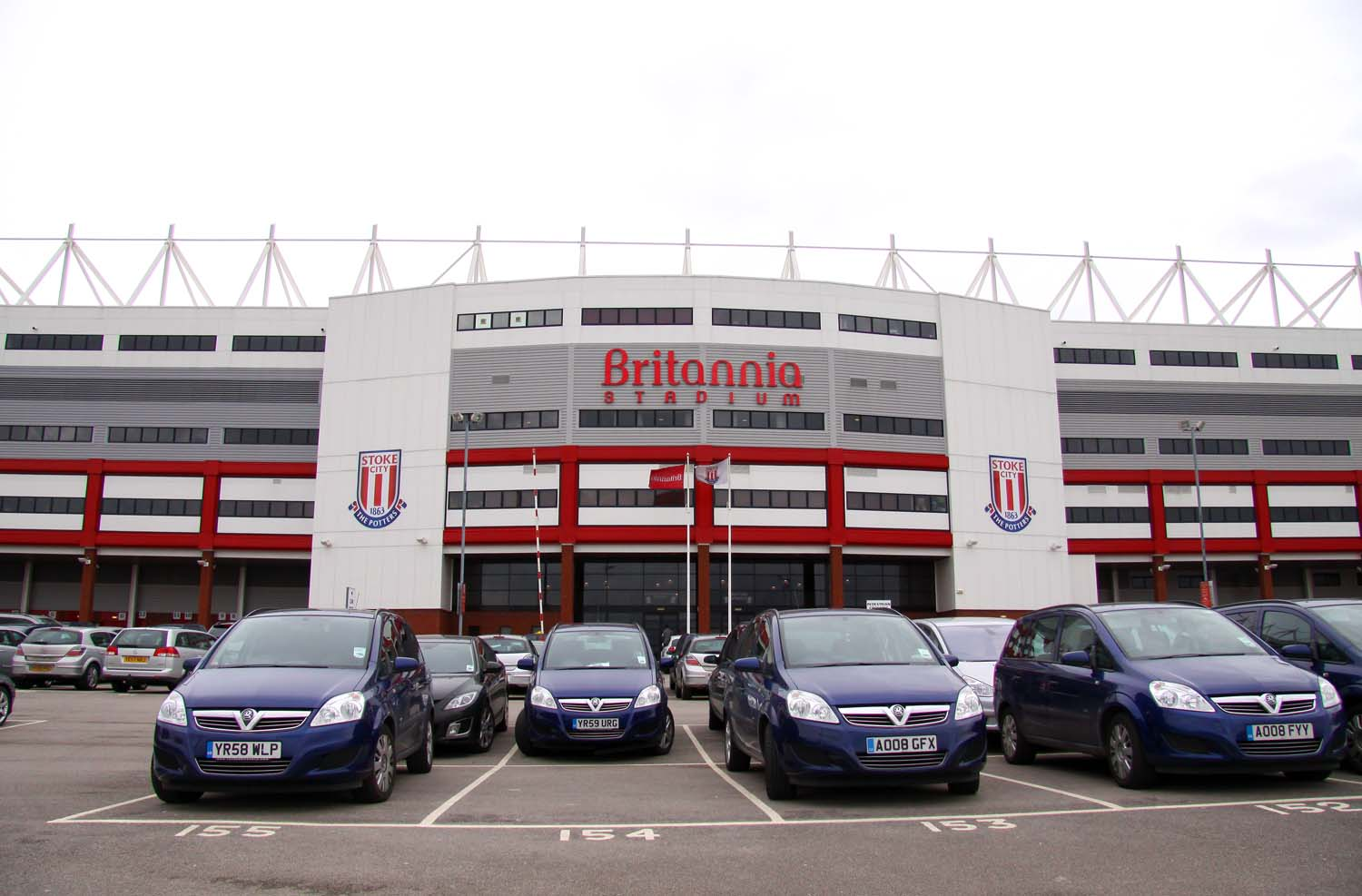
Main stand exterior

The all-seater stadium cost nearly £15 million to build and brought the club up to standards with the Taylor Report of January 1990 to end 115 years at the Victoria Ground. Along with the possibility of converting the Victoria Ground into an all-seater stadium, relocation was being considered by 1995 and by early 1996 the decision to build a new stadium elsewhere had been confirmed.

Construction of the stadium was underway during the 1996–97 season. In August 1997 it opened its doors for the first time as the Britannia Stadium thanks to a £1 million, 10-year sponsorship deal with the Britannia Building Society which was instrumental in the overall funding of the project. Another £4.5 million was given as a grant by the Football Trust.

The stadium's opening did not go according to plan, as from the outset there was concern about getting there, as the plans covered only one access road from the nearby A50, and as a result, spectators arriving from the city or the motorway had to travel up the A50 for over a mile to a roundabout at Sideway and double-back the other way, which caused huge congestion. The stadium was officially opened by club legend Sir Stanley Matthews, then aged 82. After he died in March 2000, his ashes were buried beneath the stadium's centre circle and a statue showing different stages of his career was put up in his honour outside the ground.

On 27 August 1997, Rochdale were the visitors for the historic first-ever competitive match – a 1–1 draw in the League Cup watched by 15,439 – and four days later the first-ever league game took place against Swindon Town before a crowd of 23,859. The first season at the new ground was a disappointing one as Stoke were relegated from the First Division, losing 5–2 at home to Manchester City on the final day of the season, with the visiting side also going down after the relegation-threatened sides above them all won their final games. The club's supporters protested against chairman Peter Coates, who stood down afterwards, only to return in 2006.

Four seasons of third-tier football followed with Gunnar Gíslason taking control of the club in November 1999. In May 2006 he sold control of the club back to Peter Coates, and soon after the club obtained full ownership of the stadium in a deal worth £6 million following the previous joint-partnership with the Stoke-on-Trent City Council and Stoke-on-Trent Regeneration Ltd. The name of the ground was changed to the bet365 Stadium in June 2016.

== Structure and facilities ==
Stand names and capacities
Stand	Location	Capacity
The Boothen End sponsored by University of Staffordshire	North	6,006
The Franklyn Stand	West	7,357
The Tile Mountain Stand	East	10,720
The Drayton Beaumont Group Stand	South	6,006

In total, the stadium cost £14.7 million and took around ten months to construct on the former site of Stafford No.2 Colliery, which had been closed in 1969. Building work began in late autumn 1996 and was completed in August 1997. The all-seater stadium can hold 30,089 supporters in four cantilever stands. The main West stand consists of two tiers of seating which house 7,357 spectators, plus all of the stadiums corporate and media facilities. The Boothen and East stands hold 6,006 and 8,789 people respectively. The South Stand, which is used by both home and away supporters can hold 4,996 people. The club's dressing rooms, offices, boardroom, ticket office and club store are positioned between the West and South stands.

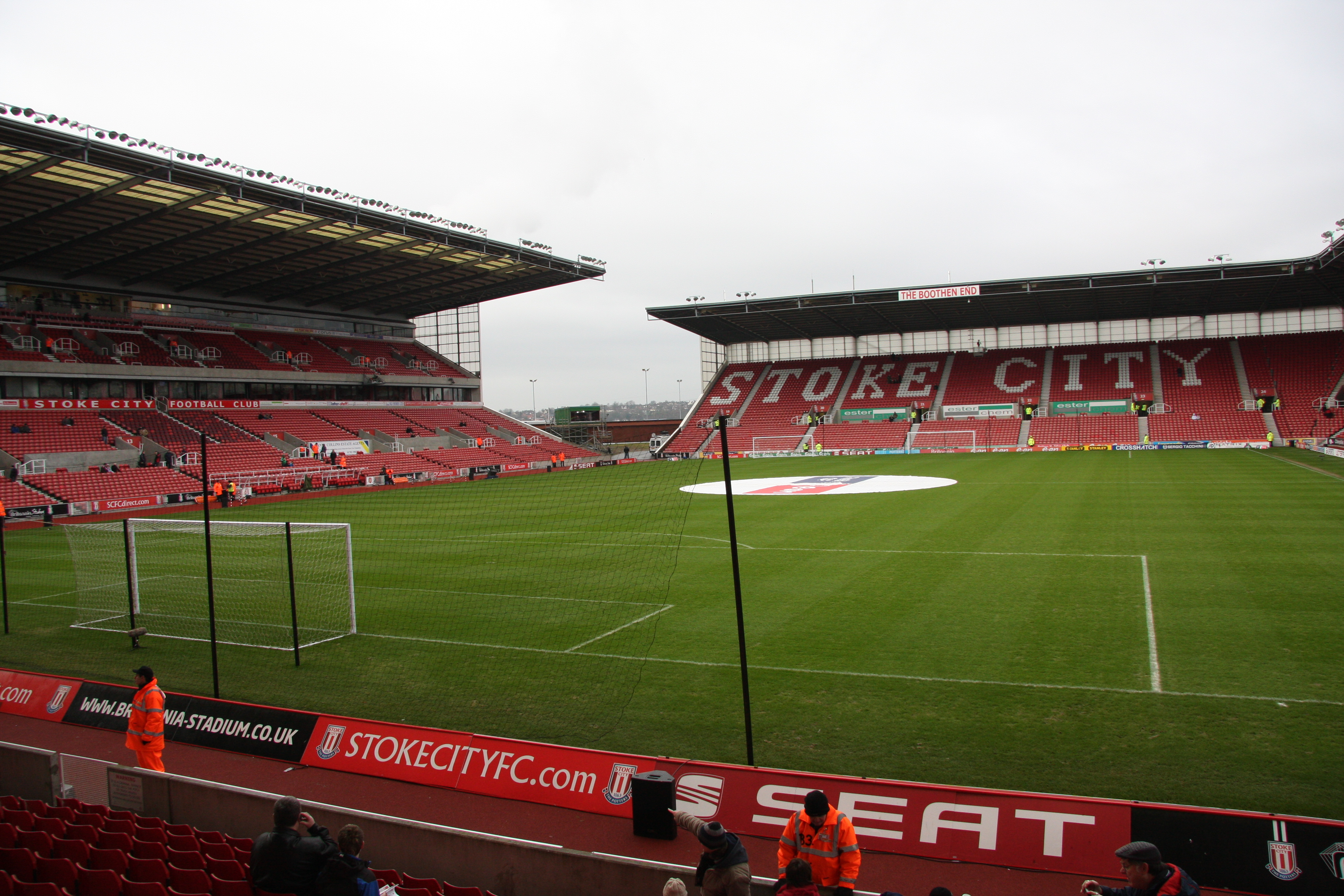
The Boothen End and main stand

In 2006, work took place on the A50 to allow direct access to the stadium from the eastbound direction, involving building a bridge across the road. It is close to the Sideway junction with the A500. At the start of the 2010–11 season, the stadium was accessible via a new underpass under Stanley Matthews Way, to reduce traffic problems with exiting the area back onto the A50.

== Development ==
In the middle of 2009, surveyors were asked to investigate the feasibility of filling in one and possibly two of the stadium's open corners. Filling in a corner of the ground would cost approximately £3 million, increasing capacity by around 3,000 seats and taking the total capacity to over 30,000. In November 2009, chairman Peter Coates said that a decision on expansion would be made at the end of the season and was dependent on the club's Premier League survival.

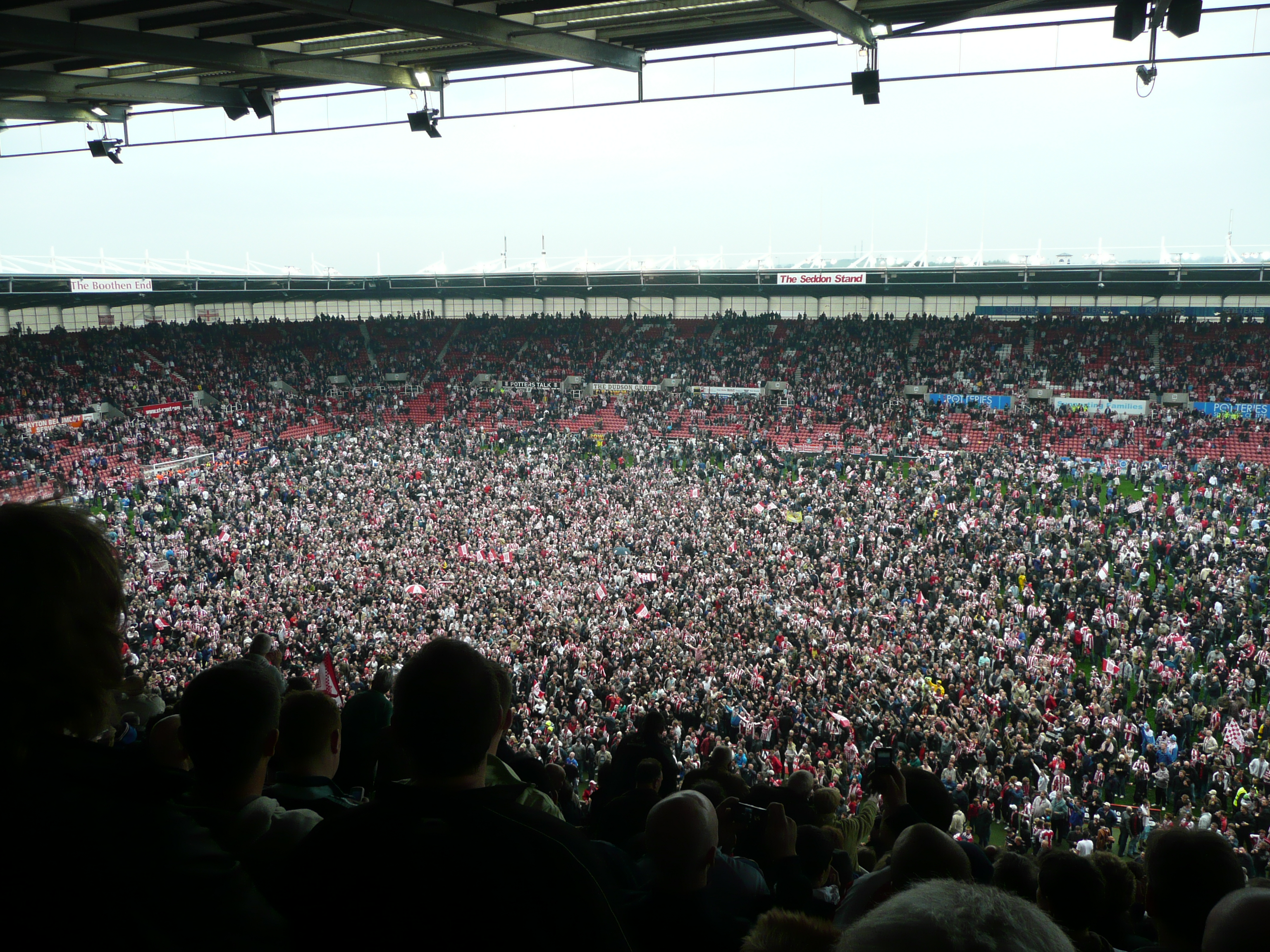
Stoke fans celebrate following promotion to the Premier League in 2008.

In February 2010, the club were still considering whether to expand the 27,500 capacity by filling in the scoreboard corner between the South and East stands. Chief Executive Tony Scholes cautioned that expansion might jeopardise the atmosphere at the stadium, one of the factors credited with Stoke City's resurgence in the top tier of English football, stating: "The big risk when anyone expands their stadium is that they could lose that 'sell-out' factor, which would affect the atmosphere. I would loathe to give that up." At the end of the 2009–10 season, Peter Coates indicated that the club would wait at least another 12 months before deciding whether to spend up to £6 million on expanding the stadium, saying: "You don't do these things lightly. It is on the drawing board and is something we will consider. But we want to feel confident we can justify it in terms of getting the increased capacity, filling it and it making economic sense."

Plans to increase the stadium's capacity to over 30,000 were unveiled in November 2012. By June 2014 work had not started, and the club CEO, Tony Scholes, stated that the club were in no rush to expand the stadium. In April 2016 plans were again revealed for stadium expansion, with a stated completion to be in time for the beginning of the 2017–18 season, which was met. Work began on expanding the stadium to over 30,000 in February 2017 and was concluded in the summer of 2017.

Stoke began a £20 million five-year refurbishment project at the stadium beginning in the summer of 2022 including replacement seats, and upgrades to Delilah's Bar (re-named Ricardo's after Ricardo Fuller) and corporate boxes.

Ahead of the 2023–24 season, Stoke City undertook a floodlighting upgrade to state-of-the-art LED floodlights. With the floodlighting upgrade, the stadium gained the ability to put on light shows, a standard occurrence at every evening game since their installation.

The away end was moved to the south-east corner ahead of the 2024–25 season with safe standing installed in the south stand. The club also opened a fan zone situated behind the Boothen End named the Boothen Quarter.

== Other events ==
The stadium also has full conference, banqueting and events facilities and has, as well as football, also staged firework displays and music concerts. The likes of Bon Jovi, Bryan Adams, Busted, Elton John and Rod Stewart have all played out on the pitch at the ground in addition to the numerous summer music concerts.

The stadium hosted the 2002–03, 2003–04 and 2004–05 playoff finals for the Conference National and on 16 April 2002, it hosted England's under-21s international friendly against Portugal's under-21s. The hosts lost 1–0 with 28,000 in attendance. England U20s and 19s have also used the stadium.

== See also ==
- List of stadiums in the United Kingdom by capacity
- Lists of stadiums
