= Shafie Effendy =

Bruneian footballer

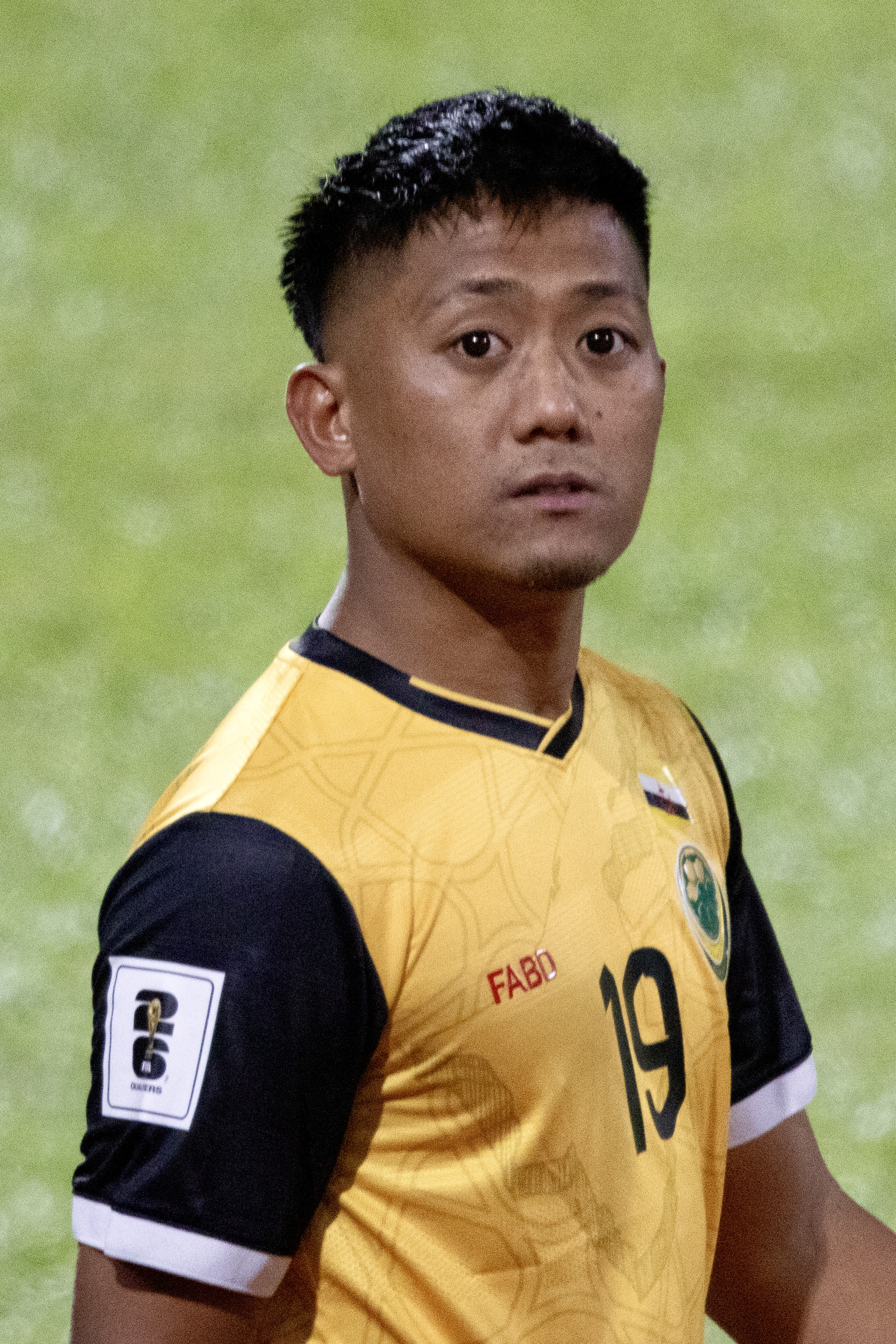
- Shafie with Brunei in 2023

Personal information
- Full name: Mohammad Shafie bin Haji Mohammad Efenddy
- Date of birth: 4 August 1995 (age 31)
- Place of birth: Brunei
- Height: 1.66 m (5 ft 5 in)
- Position: Forward

Team information
- Current team: MS ABDB
- Number: 17

Youth career
- Sports School

Senior career*
| Years | Team | Apps | (Gls) |
| 2010–2011 | Brunei Youth Team | | |
| 2014 | IKLS | | |
| 2015–2016 | Tabuan Muda | | (8) |
| 2017–2018 | Indera | | (11) |
| 2018–2019 | DPMM | 11 | (0) |
| 2020 | MS ABDB | 0 | (0) |
| 2020 | DPMM II | 2 | (0) |
| 2021– | MS ABDB | 28 | (4) |

International career^{‡}
| 2011 | Brunei U18 | | |
| 2012 | Brunei U21 | 4 | (0) |
| 2013 | Brunei U19 | 3 | (0) |
| 2013–2017 | Brunei U23 | 15 | (0) |
| 2015–2025 | Brunei | 9 | (1) |
- * Club domestic league appearances and goals as of 3 November 2026 ‡ National team caps and goals as of 16 November 2024

Soldadu (U) Mohammad Shafie bin Haji Mohammad Efenddy (born 4 August 1995) is a Bruneian footballer who plays for MS ABDB of the Brunei Super League. He is adept at playing on either flank or as a striker.

== Club career ==
Shafie started his club career with the Brunei Youth Team in 2011, playing in the Brunei Premier League II. He then laced up for IKLS FC in the 2014 Brunei Premier League. The following year, he played for Tabuan Muda, a league team that was formed by the NFABD to prepare for international competitions. They finished fifth in the 2015 and 2016 seasons of the Brunei Super League.

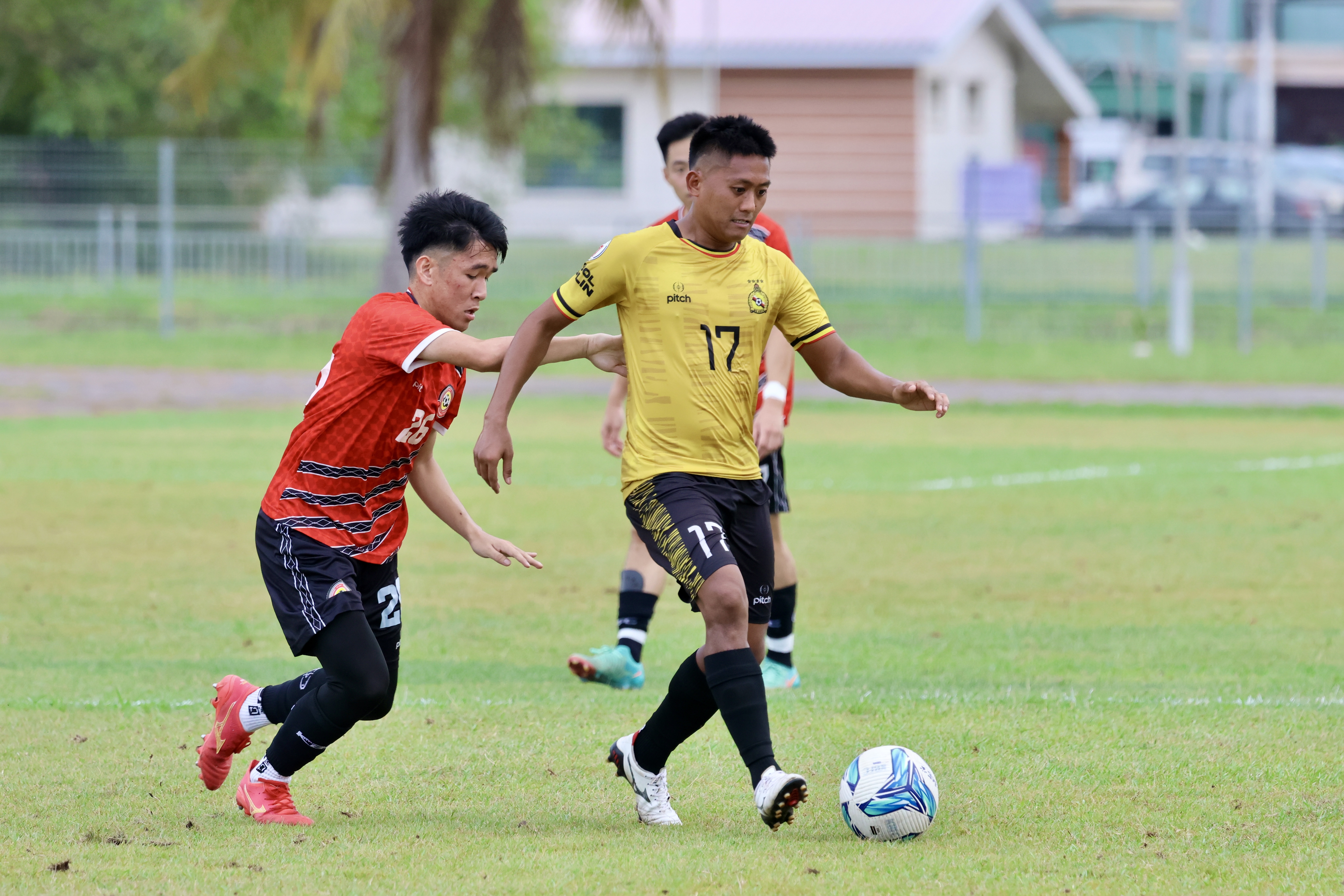
Shafie with MS ABDB during the 2024–25 Brunei Super League

Shafie moved to Indera SC in 2017. He scored his first two goals for Indera on 10 September against Menglait FC which finished 4–0. On 26 September, Shafie scored a hattrick in a 6–0 victory over Najip I-Team. He contributed a total of 11 goals for Indera who finished third in the league.

Shafie signed for professional club DPMM FC of the Singapore Premier League on 13 February 2018. He made his debut on 24 May in a 1–1 draw against Young Lions as a 77th-minute substitute, providing the assist for Adi Said's equalising goal three minutes from time.

Shafie finished the 2018 Singapore Premier League with 11 appearances under Renê Weber, but struggled to even make the bench under Adrian Pennock who prefers wing-backs supplying a front two and bringing on Razimie Ramlli as a super-sub role. At the second half of the season, Shafie made way for Hakeme Yazid Said in the DPMM squad.

At the start of the 2020 Brunei Super League, Shafie signed with defending champions MS ABDB, which coincided with his drafting into the Royal Brunei Air Force. However he transferred to DPMM FC II at the behest of ex-ABDB coach Rosmin Kamis who was put in charge of the team shortly after the Piala Sumbangsih loss to Kota Ranger FC on 8 February.

He returned to the Armymen in 2021 and has been playing there since, being nominated as team captain from 2025 after the retirement of Baharin Hamidon.

== International career ==
Shafie has been playing exclusively with the national team setup ever since graduating from Brunei's Sports School. He was a member of the Brunei under-21 side that was triumphant on home soil at the 2012 Hassanal Bolkiah Trophy, starting three games out of six.

A year later, Shafie travelled to Thailand with the Brunei under-19s for the 2014 AFC U-19 Championship qualification, where they lost all three games. A similar story happened with the under-23s at the 27th SEA Games football tournament in Myanmar two months later, where Shafie only played twice.

Shafie missed out on the 2014 Hassanal Bolkiah Trophy but returned with the under-23s for the 2016 AFC U-23 Championship qualification held in Indonesia in late March 2015. Scoreless and goalless, the same team headed for the 28th SEA Games. Shafie was ever-present although the Young Wasps lost all five of their games.

Shafie made his full international debut on 3 November 2015 versus Cambodia in a friendly match that finished 6–1 against Brunei. He was selected for the 2016 AFF Suzuki Cup qualification matches held in Cambodia in October. He started the first game against Timor-Leste and scored the winner in a 2–1 victory, which was also his first international goal.

In July 2017, Shafie captained the under-23s for the 2018 AFC U-23 Championship qualification that took place in Yangon, Myanmar. The Young Wasps lost all three games. The same story happened at the 29th SEA Games held in Malaysia a month later, where ever-present Shafie and compatriots suffered four defeats out of four.

Shafie was selected for the national team's 2018 AFF Suzuki Cup qualification matches against Timor-Leste in early September. He played the first 45 minutes in a 3–1 defeat away from home in the first leg in Kuala Lumpur. Brunei were knocked out 2–3 on aggregate.

Despite yet to make an appearance in the 2019 season for DPMM, Shafie was in contention for a place in the national squad to face Mongolia at the 2022 World Cup qualification matches in July. However he pulled out of the two-legged tie due to unspecified reasons.

In December 2022, he was selected for the national team in the 2022 AFF Mitsubishi Electric Cup and featured against Indonesia in Kuala Lumpur in a 0–7 loss. A year later, he was also involved in the national team setup for the 2026 World Cup qualification without making an appearance.

After two years of being in the periphery of the national team, Brunei caretaker coach Jamie McAllister selected him for the 2024 ASEAN Championship qualification matches against Timor-Leste in October 2024 in place of Razimie Ramlli. The Scot utilised Shafie as a second-half substitute in both home and away legs, the tie ending 0–1 in favour of the Timorese who secured their place at the 2024 ASEAN Championship over Brunei. The following month, he was given a start by new head coach Vinícius Eutrópio against Russia in an away friendly that finished 11–0 to the home side.

== International goals ==
| Goal | Date | Venue | Opponent | Score | Result | Competition |
|---|---|---|---|---|---|---|
| 1. | 15 October 2016 | Olympic Stadium, Phnom Penh, Cambodia | Timor-Leste | 2–1 | 2–1 | 2016 AFF Suzuki Cup qualification |

== Honours ==
Brunei U21

- Hassanal Bolkiah Trophy: 2012

Individual

- Meritorious Service Medal (PJK; 2012)
