= Razimie Ramlli =

Bruneian footballer

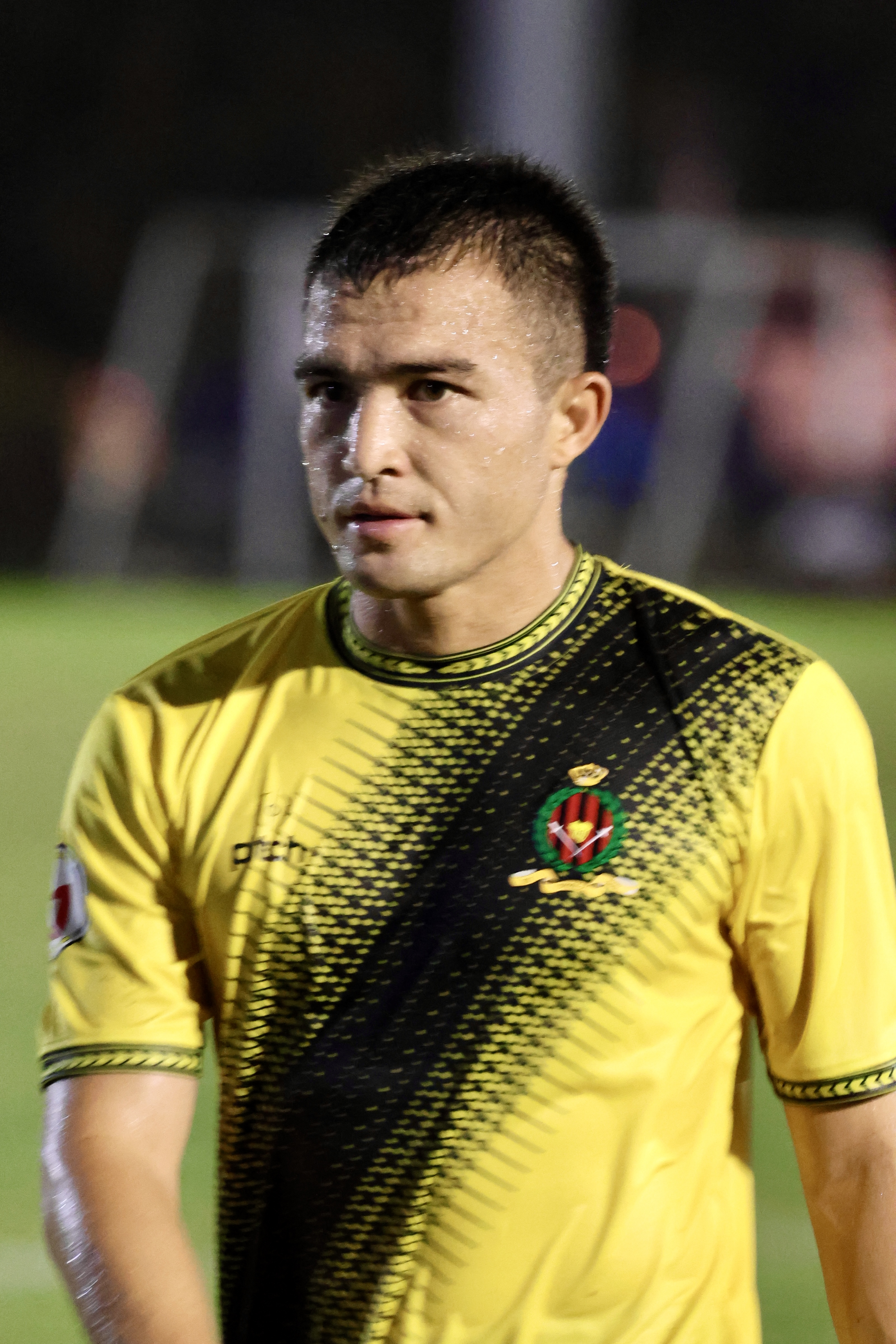
- Razimie with DPMM II in 2024

Personal information
- Full name: Muhammad Razimie bin Ramlli
- Date of birth: 6 August 1990 (age 36)
- Place of birth: Batang Mitus, Brunei
- Height: 1.64 m (5 ft 5 in)
- Position: Striker

Team information
- Current team: DPMM FC II
- Number: 18

Senior career*
Years	Team	Apps	(Gls)
2015–2019	MS ABDB	54	(44)
2019–2024	DPMM	41	(6)
2024	DPMM II	5	(2)
2025	MS ABDB	2	(3)
2026–	DPMM II	3	(0)

International career^{‡}
2016–2024	Brunei	20	(6)
- * Club domestic league appearances and goals as of 3 November 2026 ‡ National team caps and goals as of 12 January 2025

Soldadu Muhammad Razimie bin Ramlli (born 6 August 1990) is a Bruneian footballer who plays as a striker for Brunei Super League team DPMM FC II. Nicknamed Belanda (the Dutchman), he is a four-time Brunei Super League winner with MS ABDB and three-time domestic FA Cup medalist, twice at ABDB and once at DPMM.

== Club career ==
=== MS ABDB ===
Razimie is a soldier with the Royal Brunei Armed Forces who began playing with its sports council's football department in 2015 team known as MS ABDB, scoring 12 goals in his debut season. He won the Brunei Super League four times in a row and also the 2015 and 2016 Brunei FA Cup.

On 29 September 2017, Razimie scored a hat-trick in the 4–1 win over title contenders Kota Ranger, who were unbeaten before the match took place. He scored 16 goals in that season to help the Armymen win their third straight championship. Despite his mid-season transfer to DPMM, his twelve goals in the same number of appearances in the 2018-19 season made him eligible for a fourth winner's medal when MS ABDB celebrated another league title in April 2019.

=== DPMM ===
In February 2019, Razimie moved to Brunei's sole professional team DPMM which competes in the Singapore Premier League, reuniting him with his ABDB strike partner Abdul Azizi Ali Rahman. He made his debut in the home fixture against Geylang International on 9 March as a late substitute, scoring a 90th-minute goal to seal a 3–0 win for his team.

On 27 June 2021, Razimie scored a hat-trick coming off the bench in a 16–1 win over BAKES in the 2021 Brunei Super League. A year later, Razimie managed to win his third Brunei FA Cup medal via victory over Kasuka in the final of the 2022 Brunei FA Cup.

=== DPMM II and back to MS ABDB ===
At the start of 2024, Razimie was released by the professional club. However, he was re-signed to the club to play for the second team in the 2024–25 Brunei Super League. After scoring two goals in five matches he left the club to rejoin MS ABDB, taking the number seven vacated by Hariz Danial Khallidden who was signed for DPMM's first team. On his second game back with the Armymen against Lun Bawang FC, he scored a hat-trick to help his side win 8–0.

== International career ==
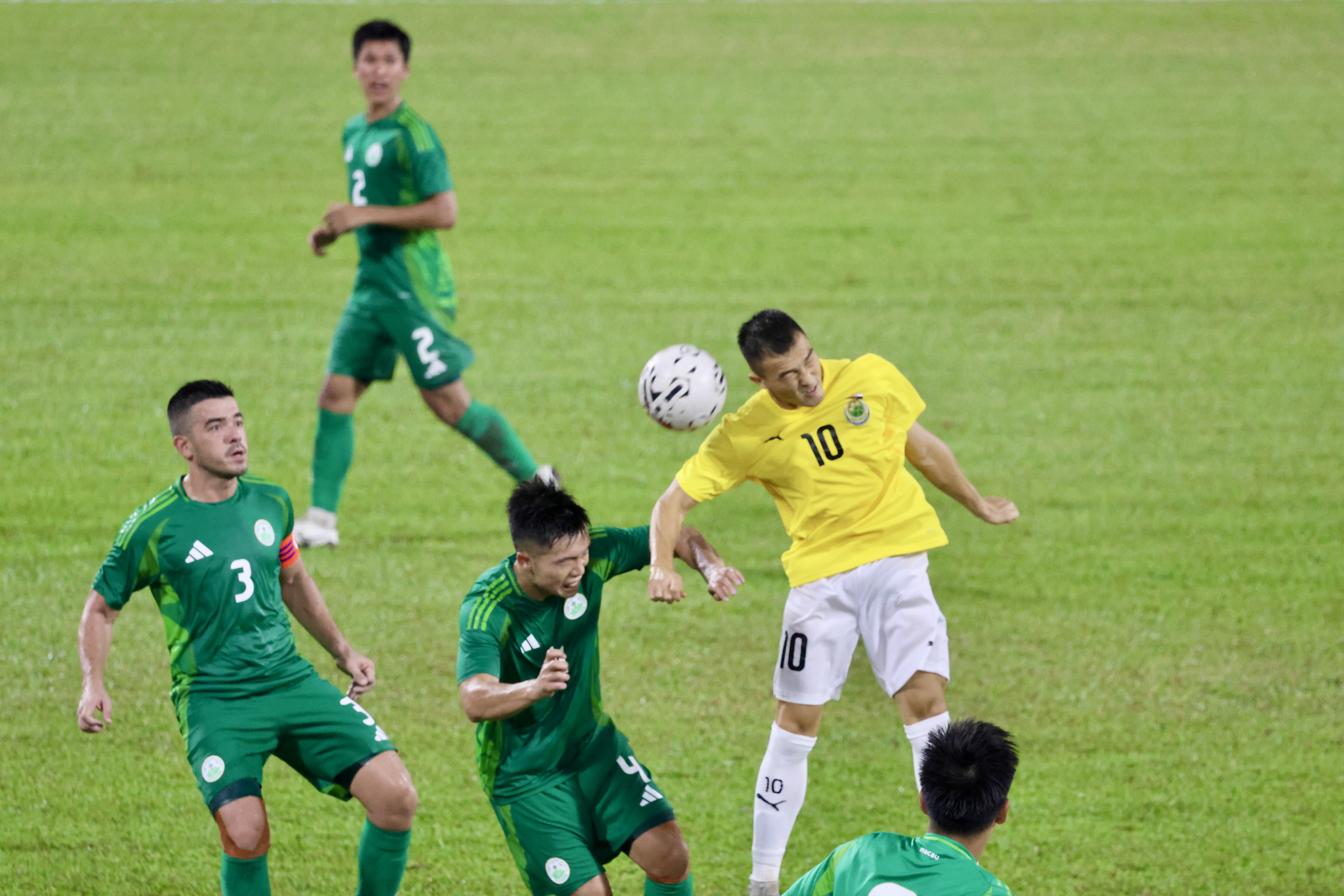
Razimie with Brunei playing against Macau during the 2027 AFC Asian Cup qualification play-off

After another solid season in 2016, Razimie was selected for the Brunei national team in October for the 2016 AFF Suzuki Cup qualification matches and the 2016 AFC Solidarity Cup. He, along with Baharin Hamidon, was a surprise addition to the squad that usually relies heavily on Brunei DPMM and Tabuan Muda players. He made his debut on 21 October against Laos and scored the final goal of the game in a 4–3 defeat. He made one further appearance at the Solidarity Cup held two weeks later in Malaysia.

In April 2018, he was selected as an overage player for the Brunei under-21 team competing for the 2018 Hassanal Bolkiah Trophy held in his home country. He came on in the second half of the opening game which ended 0–1 against Timor-Leste. Later that year, he appeared for the full national team as a second-half substitute in a 1–0 win against Timor-Leste at the Hassanal Bolkiah National Stadium on 8 September.

The following year, Razimie was selected for the Wasps' two-legged 2022 World Cup qualification in June. He started in both games and scored twice in the second leg at home for a 2–1 win over Mongolia. His goals were not enough to put Brunei through as Brunei lost 2–3 on aggregate.

After the COVID-19 pandemic prevented Brunei from playing any international matches for three years, Razimie laced up for the national team in four friendlies in 2022. The first game was against Laos that finished 3–2 to the hosts in Vientiane on 27 May. Exactly two months later, he started the game against Malaysia at Bukit Jalil Stadium in a 4–0 loss. Later that September he made two further appearances for the Wasps playing at home, one from the start in a 0–3 defeat to the Maldives and one from the bench in a 1–0 win over Laos.

On 5 November the same year, Razimie came off the bench at half-time and scored two goals in a 6–2 win over Timor-Leste at the 2022 AFF Championship qualification first leg match. He earned a starting place in the second leg three days later but failed to score as Brunei lost 1–0. Brunei still went on to the group stage with a 6–3 aggregate win. At the tournament which was held the next month, Razimie played in all four of Brunei's group matches and scored a goal against the Philippines in a 5–1 loss.

In November 2024 Razimie was selected by new national head coach Vinícius Eutrópio for an away friendly against Russia in Krasnodar. He featured from the start and lasted for an hour in a 11–0 heavy defeat.

== Career statistics ==
=== Overview ===
As of 13 September 2026

Club	Season	League			Cup		Other		Total	
Club	Season	Division	Apps	Goals	Apps	Goals	Apps	Goals	Apps	Goals
MS ABDB	2015	Brunei Super League	14	12	3	4	0	0	17	16
MS ABDB	2016	Brunei Super League	9	4	3	2	1 (Note: Appearance(s) in Brunei Super Cup)	0	13	6
MS ABDB	2017–18	Brunei Super League	19	16	2	3	1	2	22	21
MS ABDB	2018–19	Brunei Super League	12	12	0	0	1	0	13	12
MS ABDB	Total		54	44	8	9	3	2	65	55
DPMM FC	2019	Singapore Premier League	20	3	4	1	—		24	4
DPMM FC	2020	Singapore Premier League	1	0	0	0	—		1	0
DPMM FC	2021	Brunei Super League	3	3	—		—		3	3
DPMM FC	2022	Brunei Super League	—		7	3	—		7	3
DPMM FC	2023	Singapore Premier League	17	0	4	0	1 (Note: Appearance(s) in AFC Cup qualifying play-offs)	0	22	0
DPMM FC	Total		41	6	15	4	1	0	57	10
DPMM FC II	2024–25	Brunei Super League	5	2	0	0	—		5	2
MS ABDB	2024–25	Brunei Super League	2	3	0	0	—		2	3
DPMM FC II	2026–27	Brunei Super League	3	0	0	0	—		3	0
Career total			105	55	23	12	4	2	132	69

=== International goals ===
Scores and results list Brunei's goal tally first.

No.	Date	Venue	Opponent	Score	Result	Competition
1.	21 October 2016	RSN Stadium, Phnom Penh, Cambodia	Laos	3–4	3–4	2016 AFF Championship qualification
2.	11 June 2019	Hassanal Bolkiah National Stadium, Berakas, Brunei	Mongolia	1–0	2–1	2022 FIFA World Cup qualification
3.	11 June 2019	Hassanal Bolkiah National Stadium, Berakas, Brunei	Mongolia	2–0	2–1	2022 FIFA World Cup qualification
4.	5 November 2022	Track & Field Sports Complex, Berakas, Brunei	Timor-Leste	3–1	6–2	2022 AFF Championship qualification
5.	5 November 2022	Track & Field Sports Complex, Berakas, Brunei	Timor-Leste	6–2	6–2	2022 AFF Championship qualification
6.	23 December 2022	Rizal Memorial Stadium, Manila, Philippines	Philippines	1–4	1–5	2022 AFF Championship

== Honours ==
MS ABDB

- Brunei Super League (4): 2015, 2016, 2017–18, 2018–19
- Brunei FA Cup (2): 2015, 2016
- Sumbangsih Cup (2): 2016, 2017

DPMM FC

- Singapore Premier League: 2019
- Brunei FA Cup: 2022
