= Ali Munawwar Abdul Rahman =

Bruneian footballer

Ali Munawwar
- Ali Munawwar with MS ABDB in 2024

Personal information
- Full name: Awangku Muhammad Ali Munawwar bin Pengiran Abdul Rahman
- Date of birth: 30 June 2004 (age 22)
- Place of birth: Brunei
- Position: Winger

Team information
- Current team: MS ABDB
- Number: 7

Youth career
- Sports School
- 2019–2020: Tabuan Muda
- 2021: DPMM

Senior career*
Years	Team	Apps	(Gls)
2020	Tabuan Muda	2	(0)
2022	DPMM	0	(0)
2023–	MS ABDB	33	(9)

International career^{‡}
2019	Brunei U16	9	(0)
2022	Brunei U19	8	(0)
2023	Brunei U23	6	(0)
2025–	Brunei	2	(0)
- * Club domestic league appearances and goals as of 3 November 2026 ‡ National team caps and goals as of 25 September 2026

Soldadu (U) Awangku Muhammad Ali Munawwar bin Pengiran Abdul Rahman (born 30 June 2004) is a Bruneian footballer who plays for Brunei Super League team MS ABDB and the Brunei national football team as a winger.

== Club career ==
Ali is a graduate of Brunei's Sports School. He was part of the Tabuan Muda scheme from 2019, and featured for their league team in the 2020 Brunei Super League, playing only two games until the league was halted by the COVID-19 pandemic. The following year, Ali joined the under-18 side of DPMM FC and competed in the Brunei Under-18 Youth League.

Ali was incorporated into a fully local DPMM team playing in the 2022 Brunei FA Cup coached by Helme Panjang, and made two substitute appearances, scoring a goal against Indera SC in the quarterfinal second leg. Ali was an unused substitute in the final where DPMM triumphed against Kasuka FC with a 2–1 score and became the winners of the cup competition.

Ali entered service as a Royal Brunei Air Force soldier in May 2023, and subsequently joined the football team of the Royal Brunei Armed Forces the following August. He became a mainstay for the Armymen under Yusof Matyassin in the following 2024–25 campaign and his performances were recognised by the league, who awarded him the Best Young Player of the Season.

== International career ==
=== Youth ===
Ali was ever-present for the Brunei under-16s at the August 2019 AFF U-15 Championship in Thailand and also the 2020 AFC U-16 Championship qualification matches in Indonesia the following month. Brunei registered a 1–1 draw against Cambodia in the AFF tournament and also claimed a 5–1 victory over the Northern Marianas at the AFC meetup.

In 2022, Ali laced up for the under-19s and made five appearances at the 2022 AFF U-19 Youth Championship in July hosted by Indonesia, all of them losses. Later that September, Ali was also selected for the 2023 AFC U-20 Asian Cup qualification matches in Kyrgyzstan, playing in all three defeats against the hosts as well as UAE and Iran.

In August 2023, Ali was selected for the Young Wasps at the 2023 AFF U-23 Championship and the 2024 AFC U-23 Asian Cup qualification squads, playing in six matches for the games that were hosted in Thailand and Jordan.

=== Senior ===
Ali's first experience with the senior Brunei national team was in June 2025, when Brunei faced Sri Lanka in a friendly in Bangkok, in preparation for the first fixture of the 2027 AFC Asian Cup qualifying third round group against Bhutan. On 5 June, Ali made his Brunei debut as a second-half substitute, replacing Nazirrudin Ismail in a 1–0 defeat to the South Asians.

In September 2026, Ali returned to the Brunei setup under namesake Ali Mustafa for the 2026 FIFA ASEAN Cup held in Hong Kong. On 24 September, Ali was brought on in the second half against Laos in place of Haziq Kasyful in a 3–1 loss.

== Career statistics ==
=== Club ===
As of 3 November 2026

Club	Season	League			Cup		Other		Total	
Club	Season	Division	Apps	Goals	Apps	Goals	Apps	Goals	Apps	Goals
Tabuan	2020	Brunei Super League	2	0	0	0	0	0	2	0
DPMM	2022	Brunei FA Cup	0	0	2	1	0	0	2	1
MS ABDB	2023	Brunei Super League	6	0	0	0	0	0	6	0
MS ABDB	2024–25	Brunei Super League	13	3	7	2	0	0	20	5
MS ABDB	2025–26	Brunei Super League	10	5	0	0	0	0	10	5
MS ABDB	2026–27	Brunei Super League	4	1	0	0	0	0	4	1
MS ABDB	ABDB total		33	9	7	2	0	0	40	11
Career total			35	9	9	3	0	0	46	12

== Honours ==
=== Team ===
DPMM

- Brunei FA Cup: 2022

ABDB

- Brunei FA Cup: 2025 (Third place)

=== Individual ===
- Best Young Player of the Season: 2023
