= Abdul Azizi Ali Rahman =

Bruneian footballer

Abdul Azizi
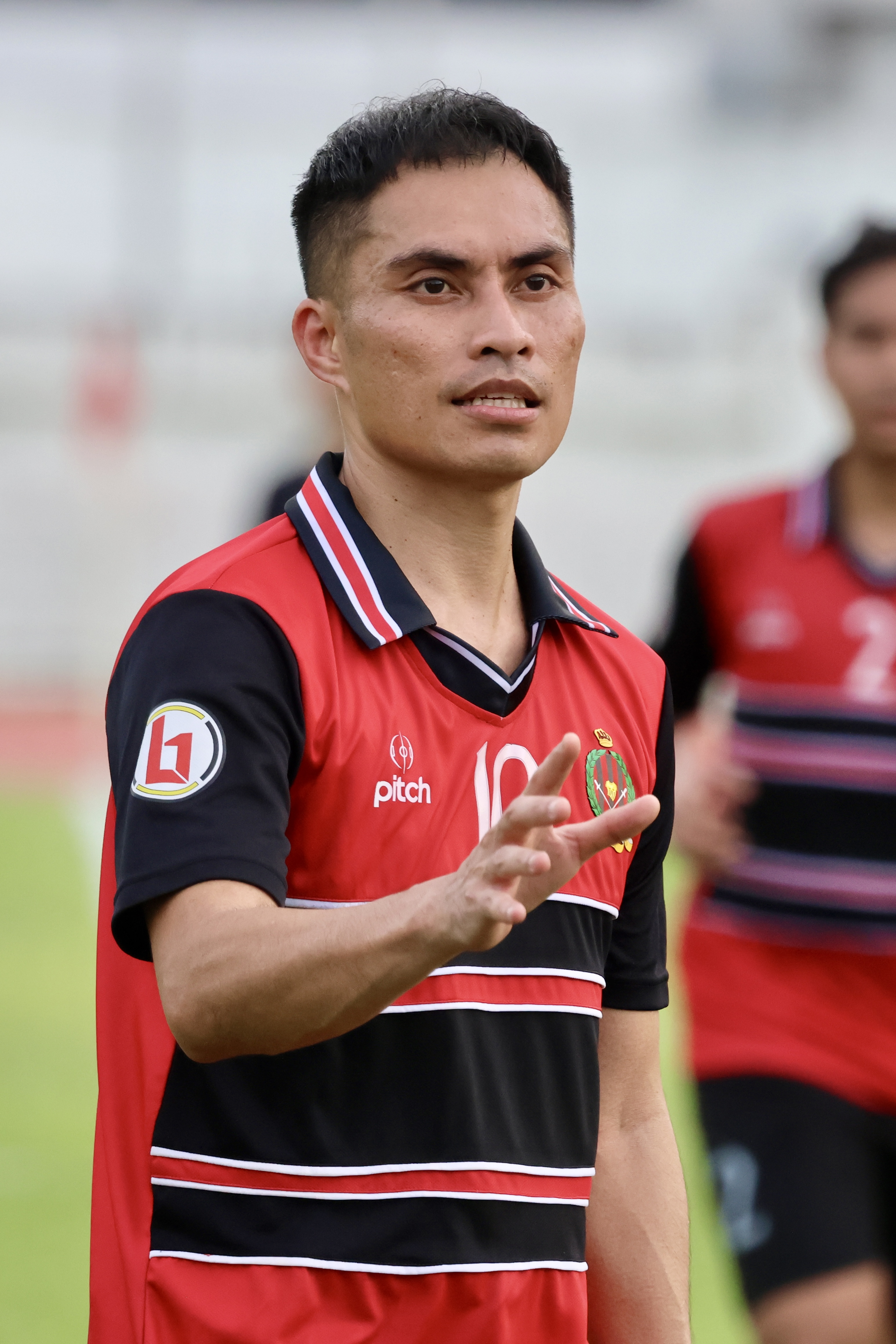
- Abdul Azizi with DPMM II in 2025

Personal information
- Full name: Abdul Azizi bin Ali Rahman
- Date of birth: 17 January 1987 (age 39)
- Place of birth: Brunei
- Position: Striker

Team information
- Current team: DPMM FC II
- Number: 9

Senior career*
Years	Team	Apps	(Gls)
2009–2018	MS ABDB		
2018–2024	DPMM	53	(11)
2019	DPMM II	4	(7)
2025	DPMM II	4	(1)
2026–	DPMM II	3	(1)

International career^{‡}
2015–2023	Brunei	19	(3)
- * Club domestic league appearances and goals as of 3 November 2026 ‡ National team caps and goals as of 26 February 2024

Soldadu Abdul Azizi bin Ali Rahman (born 17 January 1987) is a Bruneian footballer who plays for DPMM FC II of the Brunei Super League as a striker.

== Club career ==
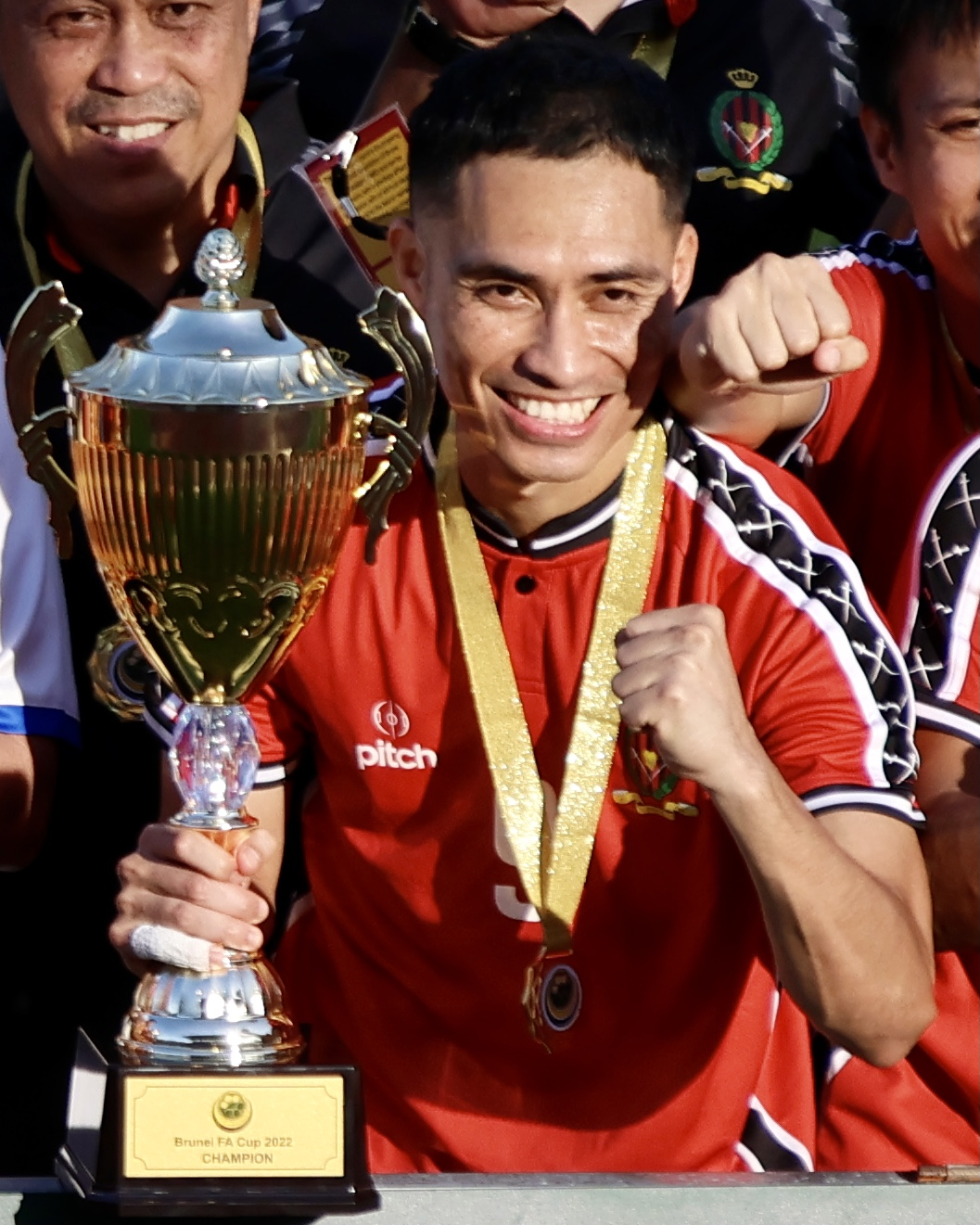
Abdul Azizi winning the Brunei FA Cup in 2022

Abdul Azizi began playing for the football team of the Royal Brunei Armed Forces in 2009. He has won the Brunei FA Cup with MS ABDB for 4 consecutive times, scoring in the 2015 final. He had once scored 6 goals in one match, in an 11–1 victory over Najip FC in 2013.

He became the overall top scorer in the 2016 Brunei Super League with 8 goals to his name. He repeated this feat in the 2017–18 season, bagging 28 goals. Altogether he has won three championships and five FA Cup winner's medals with MS ABDB before his departure in 2018.

Abdul Azizi officially joined DPMM FC on 13 February 2018, uniting him with his younger brother Azwan who has been playing there since 2013. He made his Singapore Premier League debut on 24 May against Young Lions in a 1–1 draw, coming on for brother Azwan in the 70th minute. Azizi made his first start at home against Hougang United on 18 August in place of the suspended Ukrainian Volodymyr Pryyomov and duly scored a hat-trick to send DPMM to a 3–1 victory. Under Renê Weber, Abdul Azizi made only two starts in 15 appearances in the 2018 season.

After the appointment of Adrian Pennock as DPMM head coach in 2019, Abdul Azizi became a regular in the starting lineup, partnering Andrey Varankow in a 3-5-2 formation. He opened his account for the season in a 2–0 victory at home to Home United on 4 May. He altogether bagged six goals for DPMM, including the winner in a 0–1 away victory against Young Lions FC, to help his side clinch the Singapore Premier League title.

For the year 2022, DPMM played domestically in the 2022 Brunei FA Cup. Abdul Azizi registered seven goals for the campaign including a hat-trick against Jerudong FC on 16 October. His team went all the way to the final of the tournament, and prevailed over Kasuka FC 2–1 which gave Abdul Azizi his sixth Brunei FA Cup medal.

Returning to the Singapore Premier League the following year, Abdul Azizi opened his account for the season against Geylang International in a 1–3 loss on 19 March. He added another goal to his tally on 8 July against league leaders Albirex Niigata SIngapore in a commendable 1–1 draw.

Azizi was announced to be leaving DPMM on 7 February 2024, along with other experienced players like Wardun Yussof, Fakharrazi Hassan, Razimie Ramlli, Hendra Azam Idris and Helmi Zambin. However, he returned to the side's second team competing in the 2024–25 Brunei Super League from January 2025, and scored a goal against Kota Ranger in a 6–1 victory on the 28th. Ultimately, the team finished as runners-up to Kasuka FC after a 2–3 loss in the final fixture of the two sides.

On 18 May 2025, he played as a starter in the 2025 Brunei FA Cup final against Indera SC. His team prevailed 1–0 through a goal by Matías Hernández, bringing him his seventh FA Cup medal in his career.

== International career ==
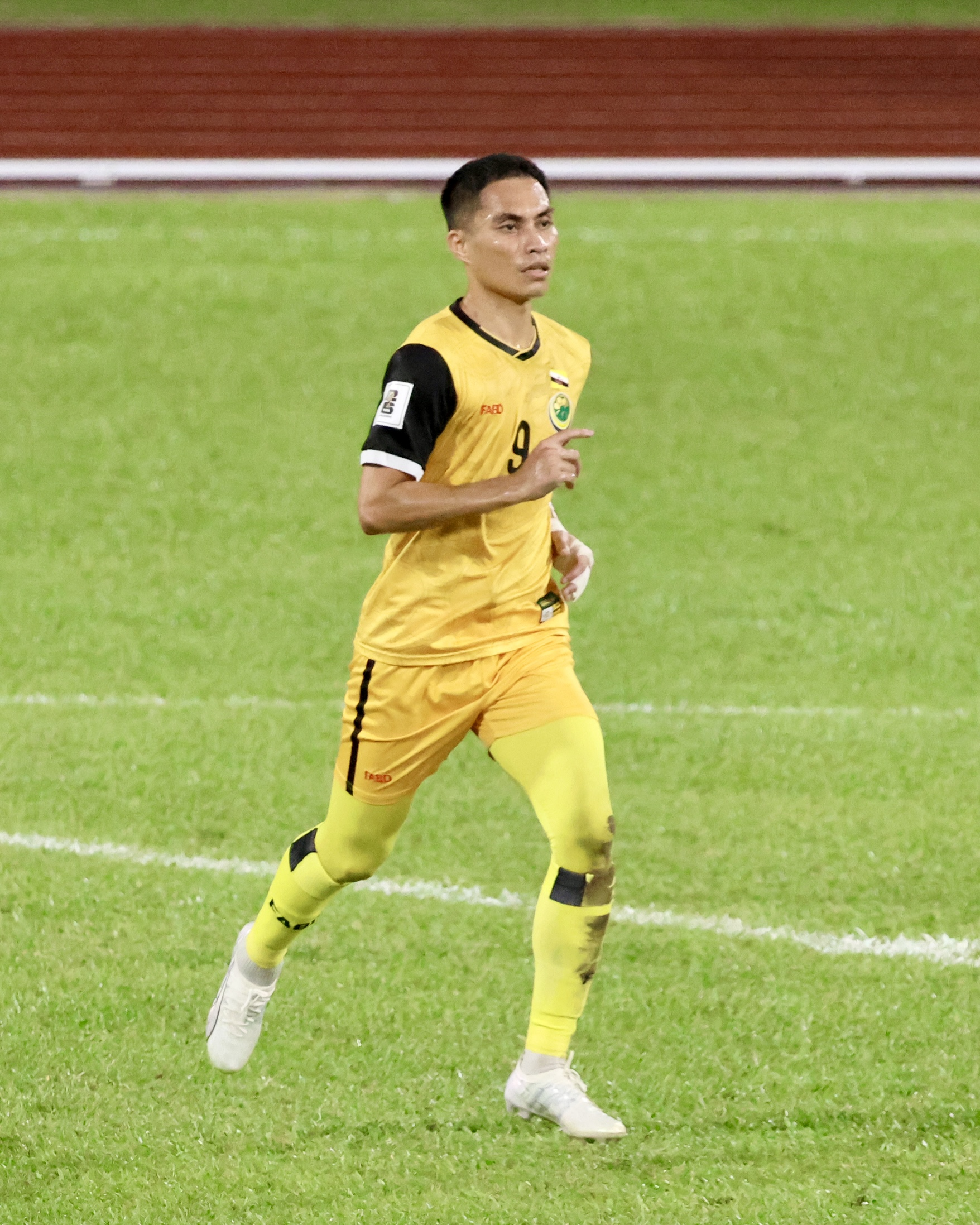
Abdul Azizi playing against Indonesia during the 2026 FIFA World Cup qualification

Abdul Azizi made his international debut against Chinese Taipei on 12 March 2015, coming on for his brother Azwan Ali Rahman in the 75th minute of the 2018 World Cup qualifier first leg, which ended 1–0 to the Wasps. He came off the bench for an injured Fakharrazi Hassan on 22 minutes in the second leg on 17 March, the final result was a 0–2 reverse which eliminated Brunei from the 2018 World Cup.

Abdul Azizi scored his first international goal against Cambodia in a friendly match on 3 November 2015. Despite opening the scoring, Brunei lost 1–6. He played a bit-part role in Brunei's international tournament outings of 2016, namely the 2016 AFF Suzuki Cup qualification and the 2016 AFC Solidarity Cup.

Abdul Azizi was to play a huge role by newly appointed Brunei coach Robbie Servais for the upcoming 2022 World Cup qualification matches in June 2019, but Abdul Azizi declined the callup for unknown reasons.

In March 2022, Abdul Azizi was back in the fold of the national team for a friendly match on 27 March against Laos in Vientiane. He started the game in a 3–2 defeat. Two months later he made a substitute appearance in a 4–0 defeat against Malaysia in Kuala Lumpur on 27 May. On 21 September he also came off the bench on half time for the home friendly against the Maldives, which resulted in a 0–3 loss. Six days later he was played from the start against Laos and this time the Wasps emerged as victors with a 1–0 win.

On 5 November 2022 Azizi scored two goals in the first half of a 6–2 win against Timor-Leste in the first leg of the 2022 AFF Mitsubishi Electric Cup qualifying fixture held in Bandar Seri Begawan. He was a substitute in the second leg which was a 1–0 defeat, but Brunei went through to the group stage of the Cup with a 6–3 aggregate win. At the tournament held the next month, Azizi made three appearances and failed to score against the likes of Thailand, the Philippines and Indonesia whereby Brunei were consigned to defeats in all of them.

On 11 September 2023, Azizi came on in the second half for Abdul Mu'iz Sisa at the away friendly defeat against Hong Kong that finished 10–0. Nevertheless, he was selected for the Wasps the following month coming against Indonesia over two legs at the 2026 World Cup qualification first round for AFC. He was handed a starting berth for the second leg at home at the Hassanal Bolkiah National Stadium on 17 October, and lasted for 60 minutes before coming off for Hariz Danial Khallidden, the resulting score was 0–6 to the Indonesians.

== International goals ==
No.	Date	Venue	Opponent	Score	Result	Competition
1.	4 November 2015	Phnom Penh Olympic Stadium, Phnom Penh, Cambodia	Cambodia	1–0	1–6	Friendly
2.	5 November 2022	Track & Field Sports Complex, Bandar Seri Begawan, Brunei	Timor-Leste	1–0	6–2	2022 AFF Championship qualification
3.	5 November 2022	Track & Field Sports Complex, Bandar Seri Begawan, Brunei	Timor-Leste	2–0	6–2	2022 AFF Championship qualification

== Honours ==
=== Team ===
MS ABDB

- Brunei Super League (3): 2015, 2016, 2017–18
- Brunei FA Cup (5): 2010, 2013, 2014, 2015, 2016

DPMM FC

- Singapore Premier League: 2019
- Brunei FA Cup (2): 2022, 2025

=== Individual ===
- General Service Medal (Armed Forces)
- Royal Brunei Armed Forces Golden Jubilee Medal (31 May 2011)
- Royal Brunei Armed Forces Diamond Jubilee Medal (31 May 2021)
- Brunei Super League Top Scorer (2): 2016, 2017–18
- Brunei Super League Best Player: 2015

== Personal life ==
Abdul Azizi's younger brother Azwan is a Bruneian international who plays for DPMM FC. Their cousin is former Brunei international Hendra Azam Idris who plays for Indera SC.
