= Baharin Hamidon =

Bruneian footballer

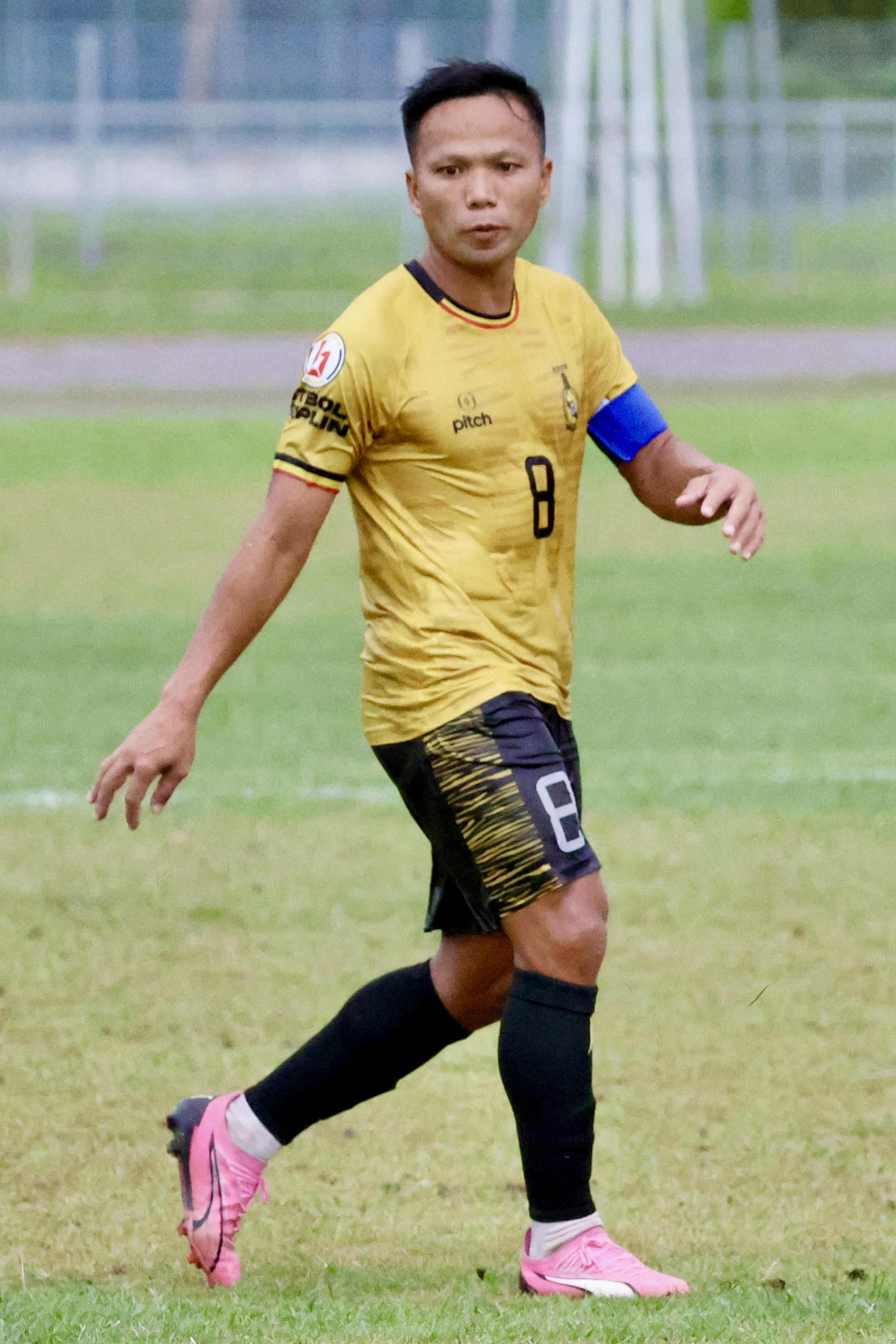
- Baharin with ABDB in 2024

Personal information
- Full name: Mohammad Baharin bin Hamidon
- Date of birth: 8 November 1987 (age 38)
- Place of birth: Brunei
- Position: Midfielder

Team information
- Current team: MS ABDB
- Number: 8

Senior career*
Years	Team	Apps	(Gls)
2008–2021	MS ABDB		
2024–2025	MS ABDB	10	(4)
2026–	MS ABDB	0	(0)

International career^{‡}
2016–2024	Brunei	2	(0)
- * Club domestic league appearances and goals as of 11 September 2026 ‡ National team caps and goals as of 16 November 2024

Sergeant Mohammad Baharin bin Hamidon (born 8 November 1987) is a Bruneian footballer who plays as a midfielder for Brunei Super League side MS ABDB.

== Club career ==
From 2008 to 2021, Baharin played at the highest division in Bruneian football for the football team of the Royal Brunei Armed Forces' sports club, MS ABDB. He has won four league titles, six FA Cups and two Super Cups with the Armymen. Baharin scored in the final of the 2014–15 FA Cup and repeated his feat in 2016.

Baharin returned to the side after a few years away serving for UNIFIL for the 2024–25 Brunei Super League and subsequently became the club captain. After handing the armband to Shafie Effendy and spending a year's sabbatical at the end of that season, he was recalled back to the side by Yusof Matyassin for the 2026–27 Brunei Super League.

== International career ==
Due to consistent performances with his club, Baharin was selected to play for the Wasps at the 2016 AFC Solidarity Cup held in Malaysia, having been on standby for the 2016 AFF Suzuki Cup qualifying matches. He made two substitute appearances in Kuching, the first in a 4–0 win over Timor-Leste on 2 November.

After returning for MS ABDB with impressive performances, Baharin was selected for the away friendly fixture against Russia on 15 November 2024. He did not take the field in a 11–0 loss.

== Honours ==
MS ABDB

- Brunei Super League (4): 2015, 2016, 2017–18, 2018–19
- Brunei FA Cup (6): 2007–08, 2010, 2012–13, 2014–15, 2015, 2016
