= 2021 Brunei Super League =

Brunei Super League
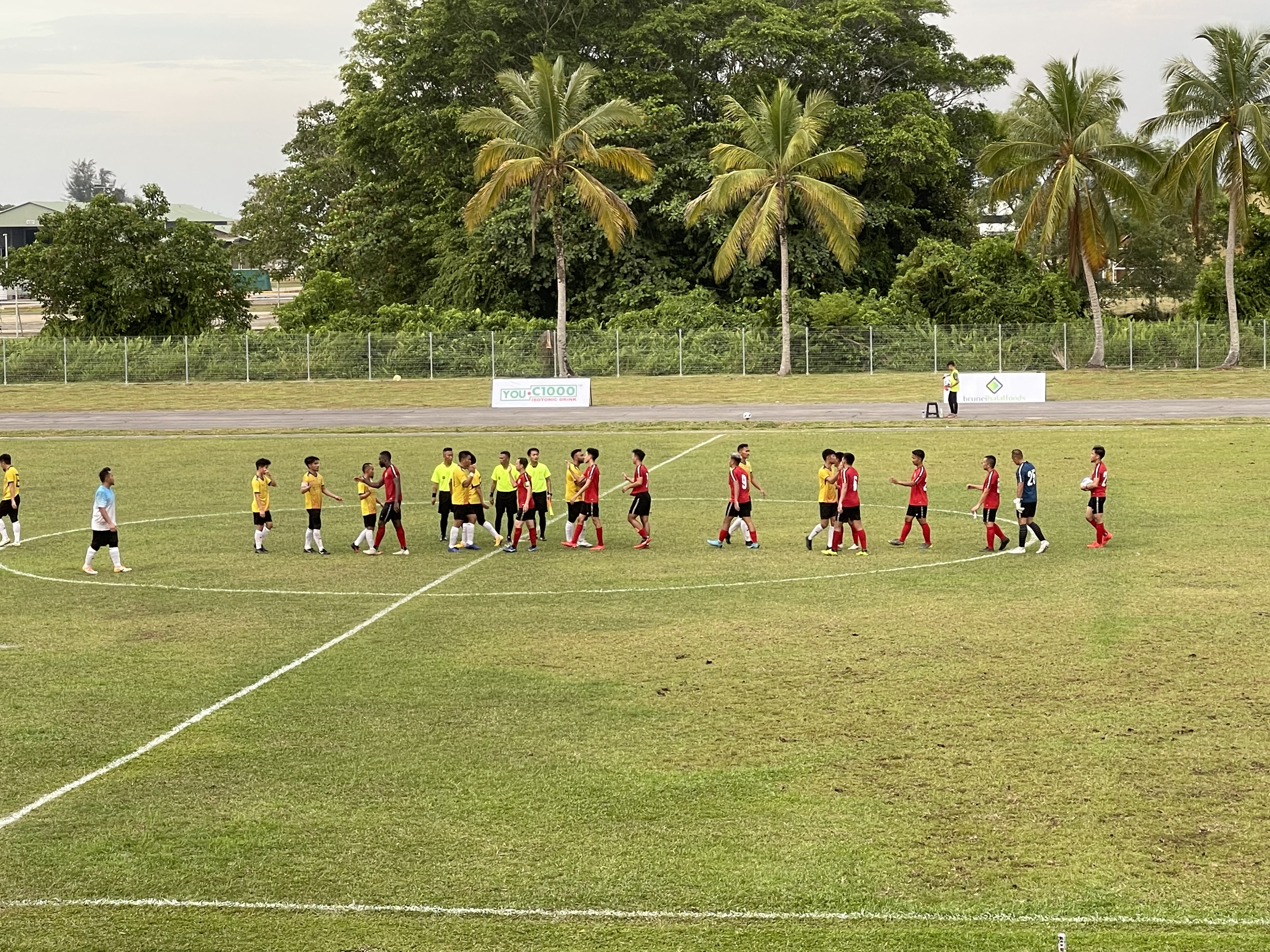
- Match between Kota Ranger and KB
- Season: 2021
- Matches: 48
- Goals: 239 (4.98 per match)
- Top goalscorer: (Belarus) Andrey Varankow (23 Goals)
- Biggest home win: DPMM 16-1 BAKES
- Biggest away win: Panchor Murai 1-11 Kasuka

The 2021 Brunei Super League was the eighth season of the Brunei Super League, the top Bruneian professional league for association football clubs, since its establishment in 2012. The season began on 20 June.

On 7 August, the Football Association of Brunei Darussalam (FABD) announced the suspension of the league due to restrictions reimposed by the presence of local COVID-19 infections announced by the Ministry of Health on the same day.

On 30 November, the FABD announced that the league will be abandoned due to the constraints caused by the pandemic, in order to prepare for a new competition to be held the following year.

== Teams ==
Location football club of Brunei Super League

| Club | Head coach | Captain | Kit manufacturer | Shirt sponsor |
|---|---|---|---|---|
| BAKES FC | (Brunei) Tajul Ariffin Sumpong | (Brunei) Hamdillah Sharbini | (Brunei) Aewon | Asadel Enterprise |
| BSRC FC | (Brunei) Hailmey Ariffin | (Brunei) Hafizul Hasnal | | Brunei Shell |
| DPMM FC | (England) Adrian Pennock | | (Brunei) PitchBN | |
| IKLS-MB5 FC | (Brunei) Ariffin Sulaiman | (Brunei) Amirul Rasyid | (Thailand) Cadenza | Defeena Event Management |
| Indera SC | (Brunei) Ameer Lani | (Brunei) Khairil Shahme Suhaimi | (Brunei) Aewon | Aewon |
| Jerudong FC | (Brunei) Julkifli Hitam | (Brunei) Sufian Lamudin | (Germany) adidas (Malaysia) Panzer | |
| Kasuka FC | (Brunei) Ali Mustafa | (Brunei) Sairol Sahari | (Thailand) Cadenza | |
| KB FC | (Brunei) Kambri Rambli | (Brunei) Azizul Syafiee Tajul Ariffin | (Thailand) Cadenza | |
| Kota Ranger FC | (Brunei) Syarafuddin Hamdi Talip | (Brunei) Adi Said | (Thailand) Cadenza | Kota Ranger |
| MS ABDB | (Brunei) Safri Othman | (Brunei) Baharin Hamidon | (Brunei) Thredz (Brunei) PitchBN | |
| MS PPDB | (Brunei) Danial Haris Abdullah | (Brunei) Zul Khairi Salleh | (Thailand) Cadenza | |
| Panchor Murai FC | (Brunei) Nurfadzillah Yussof | (Brunei) Fadillah Puasa | (Thailand) Cadenza | |
| Rimba Star FC | (Brunei) Yassin Noor | (Brunei) Hasmadi Wahit | (Brunei) FS Create | FS Create |
| Setia Perdana FC | (Brunei) Sofrin Serudin | (Brunei) Syafiq Karim | (Thailand) Lugust | Panda Exclusive |
| Wijaya FC | (Brunei) Zulkefly Duraman | (Brunei) Marhazif Ahad | (Italy) Kappa | Toyota Brunei |

== Foreign players ==
| Club | Player 1 | Player 2 | Player 3 | Player 4 | Former Players |
|---|---|---|---|---|---|
| BAKES FC | | | | | |
| BSRC FC | | | | | |
| DPMM FC | (Brazil) Emerson | (Belarus) Andrey Varankow | (England) Charlie Clough | | |
| IKLS-MB5 | | | | | |
| Indera SC | (Nigeria) Emmanuel Samson Kella | (Nigeria) Micheal Henry | (Germany) Julien Gerster | | |
| Jerudong FC | (Indonesia) Yansen Efendi | | | | |
| Kasuka FC | (Ghana) Samuel Kojo Abbey | (Liberia) Leon Sullivan Taylor | (Japan) Shota Wada | (Japan) Shunya Ando | |
| KB FC | | | | | |
| Kota Ranger | (Nigeria) Babatunde Abiodun | (Japan) Shun Kamino | | | |
| MS ABDB | MS ABDB (Royal Brunei Armed Forces) and MS PPDB (Royal Brunei Police Force) do not field foreigners | | | | |
| MS PPDB | MS ABDB (Royal Brunei Armed Forces) and MS PPDB (Royal Brunei Police Force) do not field foreigners | | | | |
| Panchor Murai | | | | | |
| Rimba Star | | | | | |
| Setia Perdana | | | | | |

== Results ==
=== League table ===
| Pos | Team | Pld | W | D | L | GF | GA | GD | Pts | Qualification or relegation |
|---|---|---|---|---|---|---|---|---|---|---|
| 1 | DPMM | 6 | 6 | 0 | 0 | 56 | 1 | +55 | 18 | Qualification for AFC Cup play-off round |
| 2 | Kota Ranger | 6 | 6 | 0 | 0 | 35 | 4 | +31 | 18 | |
| 3 | Indera | 7 | 5 | 1 | 1 | 27 | 2 | +25 | 16 | |
| 4 | Kasuka | 6 | 5 | 0 | 1 | 31 | 3 | +28 | 15 | |
| 5 | MS PPDB | 6 | 4 | 0 | 2 | 14 | 9 | +5 | 12 | |
| 6 | MS ABDB | 6 | 3 | 3 | 0 | 10 | 5 | +5 | 12 | |
| 7 | BSRC | 7 | 3 | 1 | 3 | 13 | 22 | −9 | 10 | |
| 8 | Kuala Belait | 6 | 2 | 2 | 2 | 5 | 11 | −6 | 8 | |
| 9 | IKLS | 6 | 1 | 3 | 2 | 6 | 11 | −5 | 6 | |
| 10 | Wijaya | 7 | 2 | 0 | 5 | 13 | 21 | −8 | 6 | |
| 11 | Panchor Murai | 7 | 1 | 3 | 3 | 7 | 31 | −24 | 6 | |
| 12 | BAKES | 7 | 1 | 1 | 5 | 9 | 44 | −35 | 4 | |
| 13 | Rimba Star | 7 | 0 | 3 | 4 | 6 | 38 | −32 | 3 | |
| 14 | Setia Perdana | 7 | 0 | 1 | 6 | 4 | 15 | −11 | 1 | |
| 15 | Jerudong | 5 | 0 | 0 | 5 | 2 | 21 | −19 | 0 | |

Updated to match(es) played on 2 August 2021. Source: FABD
Rules for classification: 1) Points; 2) Goal difference; 3) Goals scored; 4) No. of wins; 5) Head-to-head; 6) Fair play record

== Top scorers ==
| Rank | Goalscorer | Club | Goals |
|---|---|---|---|
| 1 | (Belarus) Andrey Varankow | DPMM | 23 |
| 2 | (Liberia) Leon Sullivan Taylor | Kasuka | 15 |
| 3 | (Brunei) Adi Said | Kota Ranger | 12 |
| 3 | (England) Charlie Clough | DPMM | 8 |
| 4 | (Japan) Shunya Ando | Kasuka | 6 |
| 5 | (Brunei) Azwan Ali Rahman | DPMM | 5 |
| 5 | (Brunei) Hamizan Aziz Sulaiman | Indera | 5 |
| 5 | (Brunei) Faturrahman Embran | Kota Ranger | 5 |
| 5 | (Brunei) Hariz Danial Khallidden | MS ABDB | 5 |
| 5 | (Brunei) Maududi Hilmi Kasmi | Kasuka | 5 |
| 5 | (Brunei) Aimmil Rahman Ramlee | Indera | 5 |
| 5 | (Brunei) Shah Razen Said | DPMM | 5 |
