= Adee Suhardee Muhidin =

Bruneian footballer

Adee Suhardee
Personal information
- Full name: Haji Adee Suhardee bin Haji Muhidin
- Date of birth: 26 September 1979 (age 47)
- Place of birth: Brunei
- Position: Midfielder

Senior career*
Years	Team	Apps	(Gls)
2015	Kasuka		

International career
2001	Brunei	6	(0)
2001	Brunei U23	2	(0)

Managerial career
- 2018–2019: Kasuka (team manager)
- 2022–2024: Brunei U23 (team manager)
- 2025–2026: Kasuka (team manager)
- * Club domestic league appearances and goals

Ustaz Haji Adee Suhardee bin Haji Muhidin (born 26 September 1979) is a Bruneian former footballer who played as a midfielder.

== Career ==
Adee played as a Brunei youth international in the late nineties, and was selected for the 2002 FIFA World Cup qualifying matches from April to May in 2001 at the age of 21. He made his full Brunei debut against Yemen as a late substitute for Rosanan Samak in a 0–5 loss. He went on to start four of the six qualifying games which all ended in defeats. He was also with the Brunei under-23 team that participated in the 21st SEA Games, featuring for the Young Wasps twice against Vietnam and Indonesia.

Adee however subsequently focused on his studies, pursuing a career as an Islamic religious education officer. He graduated from Universiti Brunei Darussalam in 2004, and taught at schools namely SR Lamunin, SM Sayyidina Abu Bakar and SAPRI Pengiran Anak Damit.

Kasuka FC, a team that withdrew from the 2007-08 Brunei Premier League, reformed in 2014 and entered the Brunei Premier League in 2015. Adee was registered as a player in that season, and celebrated promotion to the Brunei Super League by finishing in third place (Tabuan U18 in second place could not be promoted). He was appointed team manager in 2018.

In February 2020, Adee was elected as a member of the executive committee of the National Football Association of Brunei Darussalam, serving until 2023. He became team manager of the Brunei national under-23 football team in 2022.

On 19 June 2026, at the 15th FABD Congress, Adee was elected as the Deputy President of the FABD.
