= Aman Abdul Rahim =

Bruneian footballer

Aman
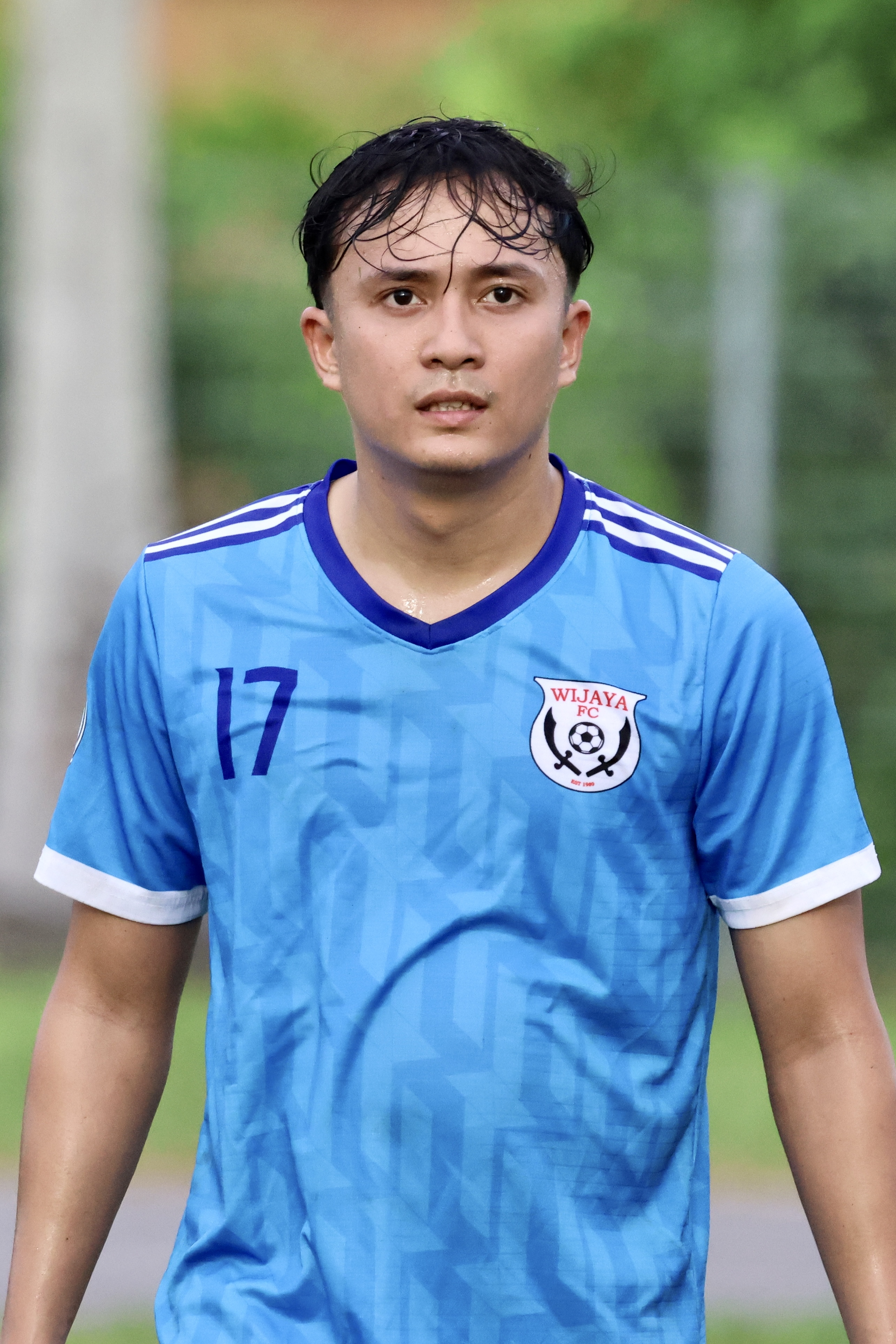
- Aman with Wijaya in 2024

Personal information
- Full name: Mohamad Aman bin Haji Abdul Rahim
- Date of birth: 23 June 1996 (age 30)
- Place of birth: Brunei
- Height: 1.68 m (5 ft 6 in)
- Position: Midfielder

Team information
- Current team: Kota Ranger FC
- Number: 17

Youth career
- 2010: PIP
- 2013: FC Phosphor

Senior career*
Years	Team	Apps	(Gls)
2015–2016	Tabuan Muda		(1)
2017–2022	Kasuka		
2024–2025	Wijaya	8	(7)
2025–	Kota Ranger	4	(1)

International career^{‡}
2013	Brunei U18		
2013	Brunei U19	6	(0)
2015	Brunei U23	6	(0)
2015–2017	Brunei	1	(0)
- * Club domestic league appearances and goals as of 26 November 2025 ‡ National team caps and goals as of 21 August 2017

Mohamed Aman bin Haji Abdul Rahim (born 23 June 1996) is a Bruneian footballer who plays as a defender or midfielder for Kota Ranger FC of the Brunei Super League.

== International career ==
Aman made his international debut for Brunei in a 6–1 loss to Cambodia in November 2015. He has also represented the under 18, under 19 and under 23 sides.

== Career statistics ==
=== International ===
As of matches played 28 March 2017.

National team	Year	Apps	Goals
Brunei	2015	1	0
Brunei	2016	0	0
Brunei	2017	0	0
Total		1	0
