= Yusof Matyassin =

Bruneian footballer

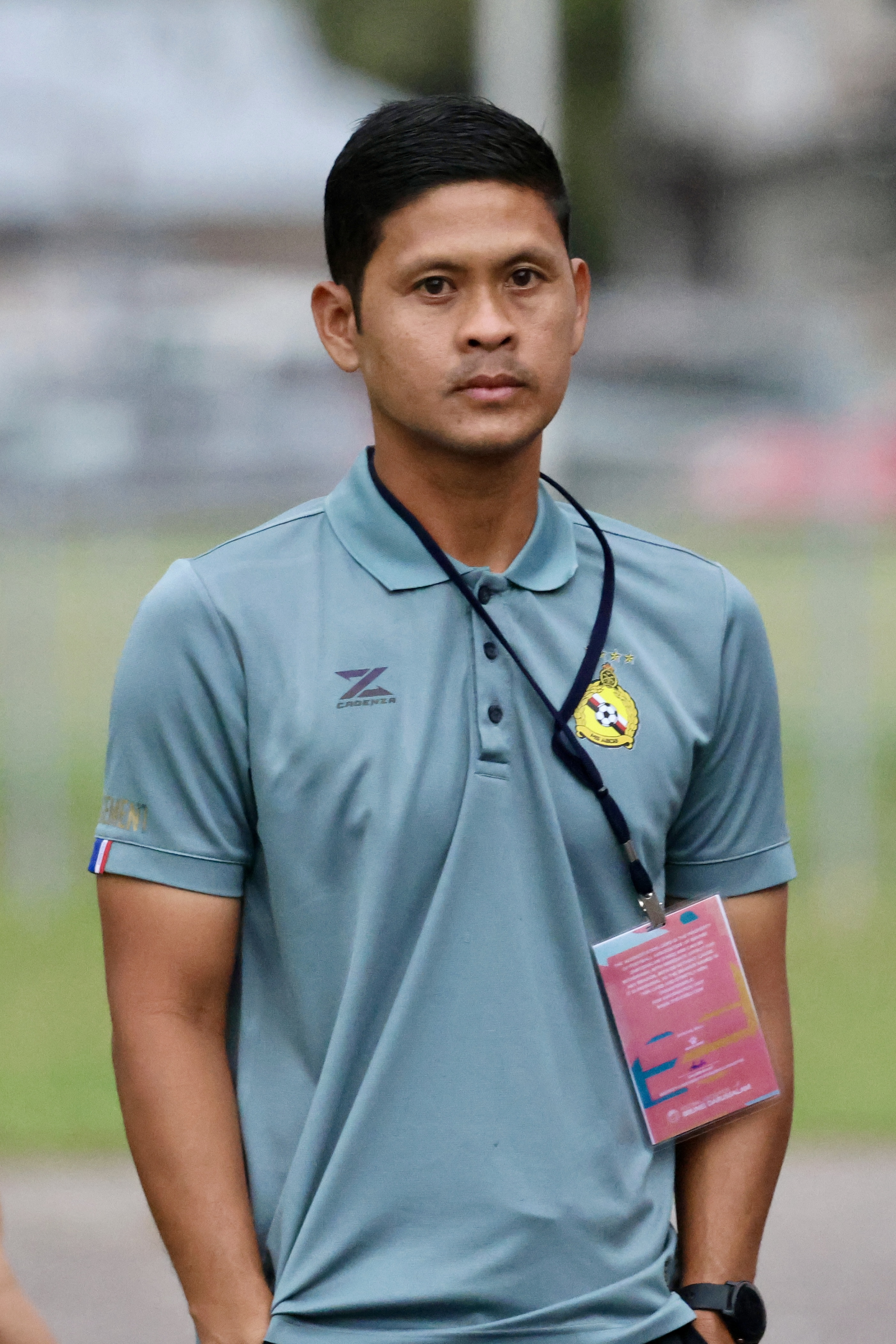
- Yusof with ABDB in 2024

Personal information
- Full name: Haji Mohammad Yusof bin Haji Matyassin
- Date of birth: 12 March 1985 (age 41)
- Place of birth: Brunei Darussalam
- Position: Defender

Team information
- Current team: MS ABDB FT
- Number: 3

Senior career*
Years	Team	Apps	(Gls)
2006–2013	MS ABDB FT		
2014	DPMM FC	0	(0)
2015–2019	MS ABDB FT		(7)

International career^{‡}
2008–2016	Brunei	5	(0)

Managerial career
- 2022–: MS ABDB FT
- * Club domestic league appearances and goals as of 7 February 2020 ‡ National team caps and goals as of 16 October 2016

Lance Corporal Haji Mohammad Yusof bin Haji Matyassin; born 12 March 1985), is a Bruneian former footballer who played as a defender. He had a one-year stint with Brunei's sole professional club DPMM FC in 2014. He is currently the coach of MS ABDB FT.

== Club career ==
A career soldier with the Royal Brunei Armed Forces, Yusof began playing for the army's football team in the Brunei Premier League I in 2006, scoring in the Brunei League Cup final of that year. He has won the Brunei FA Cup a total of six times with the armymen, the latest one in 2016.

Yusof was selected to play for Brunei DPMM FC in 2014. He was released without making an appearance at the end of the season. He rejoined MS ABDB FT in 2015, and finally won the Bruneian league championship.

== International career ==
Yusof made his first appearance for the Brunei national football team at the 2008 AFC Challenge Cup qualification round against Philippines in a 0–1 loss on 13 May. He started all three qualification games, but Brunei only gained one point against Bhutan.

Yusof was included in the Brunei squad to face Chinese Taipei for the 2018 World Cup qualifying matches in March 2015, but did not take the pitch. He appeared as a second-half substitute in a friendly against Singapore on 6 June 2015. He was selected for the 2016 AFF Suzuki Cup qualification held in Cambodia in October 2016 and made one appearance, coming on as a first-half stoppage time substitute for the injured Najib Tarif in the 2–1 win against Timor-Leste.

== Honours ==
MS ABDB FT

- Brunei Super League (4): 2015, 2016, 2017–18, 2018–19
- Brunei FA Cup (6): 2007–08, 2010, 2012–13, 2014–15, 2015, 2016
- Brunei League Cup: 2006
