= 2024–25 Brunei Super League =

Brunei Super League
- Season: 2024–25
- Champions: Kasuka FC (2nd title)
- Matches: 91
- Goals: 471 (5.18 per match)
- Top goalscorer: Willian dos Santos (35 goals)
- Biggest home win: Kasuka 19–0 Panchor Murai
- Biggest away win: Rimba Star 0–11 Kasuka
- Highest scoring: Kasuka 19–0 Panchor Murai

The 2024–25 Brunei Super League was the tenth season of the Brunei Super League, the top football league in Brunei since its establishment in 2012. The league began on 30 August 2024 and concluded on 7 February 2025.

The official match ball is manufactured by Kelme.

On 2 February 2025, Kasuka FC became the champions for the second consecutive time by beating DPMM FC II at Jerudong Park Mini Stadium 2–3 in their final fixture.

== Teams ==
A total of 14 teams competed in this edition of the Brunei Super League. Prior to the league's opening fixtures, BAKES FC and IKLS-MB5 FC announced on their respective social media accounts of their withdrawal from the new season. Setia Perdana was excluded from the list of participants when the league was unveiled.

DPMM FC, who are currently competing in the 2024–25 Singapore Premier League, also fielded a team in the league, as they had done in the short-lived 2020 season.

Club	Head coach	Captain	Kit manufacturer	Shirt sponsor
AKSE Bersatu	(Brunei) Hazreen Masri	(Brunei) Shahronny Awang	(Malaysia) ASK Creative	
BSRC FC	(Brunei) Hailmey Ariffin	(Brunei) Hafizul Hasnal	(Brunei) Sports Alliance	
DPMM FC II	(Brunei) Helme Panjang	(Brunei) Abdul Muntaqim	(Brunei) Pitch	
Indera SC	(Nigeria) Mba Vitus Onyekachi	(Brunei) Amirul Hakeem Kasim	(Indonesia) FX Apparel	Bakti Dewa School
Jerudong FC	(Brunei) Julkifli Hitam	(Brunei) Elisa Sabtu	(Malaysia) Panzer (Germany) Adidas	
Kasuka FC	(Slovakia) Matúš Bôžik	(Brunei) Afi Aminuddin	(Brunei) Kadaba Sports	Chapayom
KB FC	(Brunei) Syazwan Othman	(Brunei) Azizul Syafiee Tajul Ariffin	(Brunei) Pitch	
Kota Ranger FC	(Brunei) Zulkefly Duraman	(Brunei) Badrul Anak Bujang	(Brunei) Pitch (Indonesia) Trops	
Lun Bawang FC	(Brunei) Ah Chua Bangau	(Brunei) Ahwaz Wira Abdullah Ating	(Germany) Adidas (Indonesia) Tactic	Tactic Sportwear
MS ABDB	(Brunei) Yusof Matyassin	(Brunei) Baharin Hamidon	(Brunei) Nueve	
MS PPDB	(Brunei) Edy Asmady Abdul Malik	(Brunei) Fazizzul Hussin	(Brunei) Nueve	
Panchor Murai FC	(Brunei) Nurfadzillah Yussof	(Brunei) Radzillah Ghani	(Malaysia) Proxy (Thailand) Lugust	Kabellab (home); Elyn Wedding Atelier (away); HYS Tindulang (away)
Rimba Star FC	(Brunei) Hambrin Tuah	(Brunei) Sufri Hussin	(Indonesia) Kick	Kick Apparel
Wijaya FC	(Brunei) Erni Hakim	(Brunei) Jamrin Johari	(Germany) Adidas	

== Foreign players ==
Club	Player 1	Player 2	Player 3	Player 4	AFC Player	Former players
AKSE Bersatu	(Morocco) Zineddine Rafik				(Indonesia) Yudha Erik Rizkyanto	
BSRC						
DPMM	(Spain) Sergio Mendigutxia	(Spain) Matias Hernandez	(Brazil) Marcelo Junior		(Japan) Kenshin Uneo	(Kyrgyzstan) Bakhtiyar Duyshobekov
Indera	(Nigeria) George Olatunde	(Nigeria) Babatunde Abiodun	(Nigeria) Kashim Oluwasegun		(Timor-Leste) Elias Mesquita	(Indonesia) Amir Hamzah
Jerudong	(Ghana) Hakimi Abdullah				(Indonesia) Yansen Effendi	
Kasuka	(Ghana) Samuel Kojo Abbey	(Liberia) Leon Sullivan Taylor	(Brazil) Willian dos Santos	(Japan) Hiroki Nekado	(Japan) Takuya Tasaka	(Japan) Takuya Miyabayashi
Kuala Belait					(India) Peer Mohammed	(Malaysia) Idde Cassidy Anak Karim
Kota Ranger	(Japan) Masaya Tahara				(Japan) Shun Kamino	
Lun Bawang						
MS ABDB	MS ABDB (Royal Brunei Armed Forces) and MS PPDB (Royal Brunei Police Force) do not field foreigners					
MS PPDB	MS ABDB (Royal Brunei Armed Forces) and MS PPDB (Royal Brunei Police Force) do not field foreigners					
Panchor Murai					(Malaysia) Talhah Rosli	
Rimba Star					(Malaysia) Ridhwan Roslan	(Indonesia) Darsoto Tjhia
Wijaya	(Tanzania) Farid Said Mohammed					

== League table ==
Pos	Team	Pld	W	D	L	GF	GA	GD	Pts	
1	Kasuka (C)	13	12	1	0	93	8	+85	37	Qualification for the AFC Challenge League qualifying play-offs and 2025–26 ASEAN Club Championship qualifying play-offs
2	DPMM II	13	12	0	1	62	10	+52	36	
3	Indera	13	10	2	1	63	8	+55	32	
4	Kota Ranger	13	9	0	4	36	24	+12	27	
5	MS PPDB	13	8	1	4	31	17	+14	25	
6	MS ABDB	13	7	3	3	36	11	+25	24	
7	Wijaya	13	6	1	6	32	38	−6	19	
8	Rimba Star	13	5	1	7	23	46	−23	16	
9	AKSE Bersatu	13	4	2	7	29	36	−7	14	
10	Kuala Belait	13	3	1	9	20	36	−16	10	
11	Jerudong	13	3	1	9	11	53	−42	10	
12	Panchor Murai	13	3	1	9	11	55	−44	10	
13	BSRC	13	2	0	11	17	48	−31	6	Relegation to 2025–26 Brunei District League
14	Lun Bawang	13	0	0	13	6	80	−74	0	Relegation to 2025–26 Brunei District League

Source: FABD
Rules for classification: 1) Points; 2) Goal difference; 3) Goals scored; 4) Head-to-head result; 5) Head-to-head goal difference; 6) Head-to-head goals scored.
(C) Champions

=== Position by round ===
Team ╲ Round	1	2	3	4	5	6	7	8	9	10	11	12	Final
Kasuka	1	1	1	1	1	1	1	1	2	2	2	2	1
DPMM II	4	7	9	5	3	2	2	2	1	1	1	1	2
Indera	3	2	4	4	5	4	4	4	3	3	3	3	3
Kota Ranger	6	4	2	2	2	3	3	3	4	4	4	4	4
MS PPDB	12	11	6	10	7	6	6	6	5	5	6	6	5
MS ABDB	11	6	7	7	6	7	9	7	7	6	5	5	6
Wijaya	2	8	11	11	11	10	8	9	8	8	8	7	7
Rimba Star	5	3	3	3	4	5	5	5	6	7	7	8	8
AKSE	7	9	12	12	13	11	11	11	10	9	9	9	9
Kuala Belait	10	12	10	6	8	9	10	10	11	11	11	11	10
Jerudong	13	13	13	13	12	13	12	12	12	12	12	12	11
Panchor Murai	8	5	5	8	9	8	7	8	9	10	10	10	12
BSRC	9	10	8	9	10	12	13	13	13	13	13	13	13
Lun Bawang	14	14	14	14	14	14	14	14	14	14	14	14	14

Table Leader

Source: FABD

== Top scorers ==
Rank	Player	Team	Goals
1	(Brazil) Willian dos Santos	Kasuka	35
2	(Spain) Sergio Mendigutxia	DPMM	34
3	(Brunei) Hazmi Salleh	Kota Ranger	16
4	(Liberia) Leon Sullivan Taylor	Kasuka	15
5	(Brunei) Sahfiq Hidayat Sharizam	AKSE	14
6	(Brunei) Adi Said	Kasuka	12
6	(Nigeria) Babatunde Abiodun	Indera	12
8	(Timor-Leste) Elias Mesquita	Indera	10
9	(Brunei) Abdul Azim Abdul Rasid	PPDB	9
9	(Brunei) Aman Abdul Rahim	Wijaya	9
9	(Brunei) Fazizzul Hussin	PPDB	9

== Clean sheets ==
Rank	Player	Team	Sheets
1	(Brunei) Ahsanuddin Dani	Indera	6
2	(Brunei) Hendra Putera Idris	Kota Ranger	5
3	(Brunei) Abdul Azeez Elyas	DPMM	4
3	(Brunei) Azriel Arman	ABDB	4
3	(Brunei) Burhanuddin Edy Asmady	ABDB	4
6	(Brunei) Azman Ilham Noor	Kasuka	3
7	(Brunei) Abdul Mutalip Muhammad	AKSE	2
7	(Brunei) Arif Aslam Abdullah	Panchor Murai	2
7	(Brunei) Mu'izzuddin Ismail	PPDB	2
7	(Brunei) Noorhaswan Aiman Noor Hassan	Kasuka	2
7	(Brunei) Romaino Maripa	Jerudong	2
7	(Brunei) Wardun Yussof	Kasuka	2

== Awards ==
Award	Name	Club	Ref
Top Scorer of the Season	(Brazil) Willian dos Santos	Kasuka FC	
Best Goalkeeper of the Season	(Brunei) Azman Ilham Noor	Kasuka FC	
Best Young Player of the Season	(Brunei) Ali Munawwar Abdul Rahman	MS ABDB	
Fair Play Award	Lun Bawang FC		
