= 2002 in Brunei =

- Decades: 1980s; 1990s; 2000s; 2010s; 2020s
- See also: Other events of 2002; Timeline of Bruneian history

Events in the year 2002 in Brunei.

== Events ==
- First soccer league, B-League started in 2002.
