= 2016 Brunei Super League =

Super League
- Season: 2016
- Champions: MS ABDB
- Relegated: Jerudong, Lun Bawang
- Matches: 45
- Goals: 153 (3.4 per match)
- Top goalscorer: Abdul Azizi Ali Rahman (8 goals)
- Best goalkeeper: Tarmizi Johari (8 clean sheets)
- Biggest home win: Indera 7–0 Jerudong (12 March 2016)
- Biggest away win: Tabuan Muda A (Brunei U21s) 0–4 MS ABDB (1 April 2016)
- Highest scoring: Indera 7–0 Jerudong (12 March 2016); MS ABDB 6–1 Jerudong (23 April 2016)
- Longest winning run: 5 matches MS ABDB
- Longest unbeaten run: 6 matches MS ABDB
- Longest winless run: 5 matches Jerudong; Lun Bawang
- Longest losing run: 3 matches Jerudong; Lun Bawang

The 2016 Brunei Super League (also known as the DST Super League for sponsorship reasons) was the 4th season of the Brunei Super League, the top Bruneian professional league for association football clubs, since its establishment in 2012. The season began on 12 March 2016 and concluded on 30 September 2016.

MS ABDB came into the season as defending champions of the 2015 season. Kota Ranger and Kasuka entered as the two promoted teams from the Premier League. NFABD concluded the league after only one round, which meant that MS ABDB retained the title with seven wins out of nine.

== Teams ==
A total of 10 teams participated in the 2016 Super League season, eight from the previous season and two promoted teams. Kota Ranger were promoted as champions of the country's second tier while Kasuka were also promoted, that's despite finishing outside the top two places in third but as Tabuan Muda B (Brunei U18s) finished second and are ineligible for promotion, it was awarded to Kasuka instead. Kota Ranger and Kasuka replaced IKLS and Kilanas who were relegated in 2015.

=== Stadia ===
Note: Table lists in alphabetical order.

Team	Stadium	Capacity
Indera	Stadium Padang dan Balapan	3,000
Jerudong	Kompleks Sukan Berakas	2,500
Kasuka	Kompleks Sukan Berakas	2,500
Kota Ranger	Kompleks Sukan Berakas	2,500
Lun Bawang	Kompleks Sukan Batu Apoi	3,000
MS ABDB	Penanjong Kem Military Base	2,500
MS PDB	Stadium Padang dan Balapan	3,000
Najip I-Team	Kompleks Sukan Berakas	2,500
Tabuan U21	Kompleks Sukan Berakas	2,500
Wijaya	Stadium Padang dan Balapan	3,000

=== Personnel and kits ===
Team	Manager	Head Coach	Kit Manufacturer
Indera		Omar Jamil	Eureka
Jerudong			Adidas/Nike
Kasuka		Abdul Rahman As-Sawdiq	Korono
Kota Ranger		Nor Hillmy Taha	Lotto
Lun Bawang			Warrix Sports
MS ABDB	Razanol Hardi Razak	Bintara Mesli Dullah	Eureka
MS PDB			Grand Sport
Najip I-Team			Lotto
Tabuan U21		(South Korea) Kwon Oh-son	Lotto
Wijaya	Ahyana Tali	Mahdini Mohamad	Cadenza

== Results ==
=== League table ===
Pos	Team	Pld	W	D	L	GF	GA	GD	Pts
1	MS ABDB (C)	9	7	2	0	21	1	+20	23
2	Indera SC	9	6	2	1	21	11	+10	20
3	Wijaya FC	9	6	2	1	17	10	+7	20
4	Najip I-Team	9	3	2	4	14	14	0	11
5	Tabuan U-21	9	3	2	4	16	14	+2	11
6	Kota Ranger FC	9	3	1	5	18	23	−5	10
7	Kasuka FC	9	2	4	3	10	15	−5	10
8	MS PDB	9	3	1	5	9	14	−5	10
9	Lun Bawang	9	1	2	6	14	19	−5	5
10	Jerudong	9	1	2	6	14	33	−19	5

Updated to match(es) played on 1 October 2016. Source:
Rules for classification: 1) points; 2) goal difference; 3) number of goals scored.
(C) Champions
