= 2017–18 Brunei Super League =

Super League
- Season: 2017–18
- Champions: MS ABDB
- Relegated: Menglait, Jerudong
- Matches: 110
- Goals: 431 (3.92 per match)
- Top goalscorer: Abdul Azizi Ali Rahman (28 goals)
- Biggest home win: Lun Bawang 9–2 Menglait (6 August 2017); MS ABDB 7–0 Menglait (10 December 2017)
- Biggest away win: Menglait 0–10 MS ABDB (9 July 2017)
- Highest scoring: Lun Bawang 9–2 Menglait (6 August 2017)
- Longest winning run: 8 matches Kota Ranger
- Longest unbeaten run: 15 matches Indera
- Longest winless run: 11 matches Jerudong
- Longest losing run: 9 matches Jerudong

The 2017–18 Brunei Super League was the 5th season of the Brunei Super League, the top Bruneian professional league for association football clubs, since its establishment in 2012. The season began on 22 April 2017.

The Royal Brunei Armed Forces Sports Council came into the season as defending champions of the 2016 season. Menglait entered as the promoted team from the Premier League. No teams were relegated from the previous season. The winner received B$14,000 ($10,000 USD).

== Teams ==
A total of 11 teams participated in the 2017 Super League season: ten from the previous season and one promoted team.

== League table ==
Pos	Team	Pld	W	D	L	GF	GA	GD	Pts	Relegation
1	MS ABDB (C)	20	16	2	2	71	9	+62	50	
2	Kota Ranger	20	14	5	1	56	22	+34	47	
3	Indera	20	13	5	2	64	17	+47	44	
4	Kasuka	20	9	7	4	41	32	+9	34	
5	Wijaya	20	10	0	10	31	37	−6	30	
6	Tabuan Muda	20	5	9	6	30	38	−8	24	
7	Lun Bawang	20	6	5	9	43	42	+1	23	
8	MS PDB	20	5	7	8	30	38	−8	22	
9	Najip	20	3	3	14	21	51	−30	12	
10	Menglait (R)	20	3	2	15	18	85	−67	11	Relegation
11	Jerudong (R)	20	3	1	16	26	60	−34	10	Relegation

Source: Soccerway FIFA
(C) Champions; (R) Relegated

== See also ==
- 2017–18 Brunei FA Cup
