= Royal Brunei Armed Forces Sports Council =

Bruneian military multi sports club

- Majlis Sukan Angkatan Bersenjata Diraja Brunei
- Country: Brunei Darussalam
- Allegiance: Sultan Hassanal Bolkiah
- Type: Royal Brunei Armed Forces multi-sport club
- Garrison/HQ: Tutong Camp, Tutong District

Commanders
- Chairman: Col. Zahrin bin Haji Zunaidi

Royal Brunei Armed Forces Sports Council; Malay: Majlis Sukan Angkatan Bersenjata Diraja Brunei, commonly abbreviated MS ABDB, is the multi-sport club in charge of all sporting activities of all service branches of the Royal Brunei Armed Forces (RBAF, Angkatan Bersenjata Diraja Brunei – ABDB), in the sultanate of Brunei Darussalam.

== Football team ==
Royal Brunei Armed Forces Sports Council Football Team
- MS ABDB FT badge
- Full name: Pasukan Bolasepak Majlis Sukan Angkatan Bersenjata Diraja Brunei
- Nickname: Armymen
- Short name: MS ABDB FT
- Founded: 1985; 41 years ago
- Stadium: Various
- Manager: Maj (U) Mohammad Alli Farid bin Ibrahim
- Coach: LCpl Hj Mohammad Yusof bin Hj Matyassin
- League: Brunei Super League
- 2025–26: 5th
- Website: msabdbft.blogspot.com
Home colours	Away colours

The association football club team of the Royal Brunei Armed Forces Sports Council (MS ABDB) is known as the Royal Brunei Armed Forces Sports Council Football Team (Malay: Pasukan Bolasepak Majlis Sukan Angkatan Bersenjata Diraja Brunei), abbreviated MS ABDB FT; it is a Bruneian professional football club which competes in the Brunei Super League (BSL), the top division of Brunei football. Founded in 1985; 41 years ago, and informally known as the 'armymen', they hold the record number of Brunei league championships (four), and seven Brunei FA Cup wins, making them the most successful football club in Brunei Darussalam.

=== Current squad ===
As of 10 September 2026

Note: Flags indicate national team as defined under FIFA eligibility rules; some limited exceptions apply. Players may hold more than one non-FIFA nationality.

No.	Pos.	Nation	Player
1	GK	BRU	Cpl (U) Azriel bin Arman
2	DF	BRU	Daniyal bin Mohd Zinin
3	DF	BRU	Sld (U) Md Abdul Wafiy Yazid bin Md Sudirman
4	DF	BRU	Sld (U) Muhamad Abdul Hafiz bin Mohamad Sabri
5	DF	BRU	LS Mohd Azroy Hairul bin Azmi
6	DF	BRU	LCpl (U) Mohd Hibatur Rahman bin Mohamad
7	FW	BRU	Sld (U) Ak Muhd Ali Munawwar bin Pg Abd Rahman
8	FW	BRU	Sgt Mohammad Baharin bin Hamidon
9	FW	BRU	LS Mohd Safaruddin bin Azmi
10	MF	BRU	LS Mohd Hadif Aiman bin Hj Adanan
11	MF	BRU	Sld Muhammad Saiful Ammar bin Hj Adis (Captain)
12	MF	BRU	LCpl (U) Muqaddim bin Abdul Rashid
13	MF	BRU	Sld (U) Muhd Hanif Farhan bin Azman
14	MF	BRU	Sld (U) Mohd Ady Aiman bin Hj Noorajrin

No.	Pos.	Nation	Player
15	DF	BRU	Sld Ak Mohd Alimuddin bin Pg Jamaluddin
16	FW	BRU	Sld (U) Muhd Rahimin bin Abd Ghani
17	FW	BRU	Sld (U) Muhd Shafie bin Hj Muhd Efenddy
18	DF	BRU	Cpl Muhd Amal Fakhri bin Mohd Othman
19	GK	BRU	Muhd Danish Aiman bin Mardianni
20	MF	BRU	Mohd Fathlinnur Adhlin bin Ratano
22	DF	BRU	Mohd Azinur Rashiman bin Awang Hj Jufri
23	FW	BRU	Sld Mohd Saufi bin Salleh
24	FW	BRU	LCpl Muhd Hariz Danial bin Awg Hj Khallidden
25	GK	BRU	LCpl Ak Amirul Hakim bin Pg Hj Zulkarnain
27	DF	BRU	Hadif Mansur Zulkarman
28	FW	BRU	Mohd Adi Shukry bin Salleh
29	MF	BRU	Amirul Hadi Yusra bin Noorajiman Yusra
30	DF	BRU	Sld Abdul Hafiz bin Mohammad

=== Coaching staff ===
MS ABDB FT management and coaching staff
Manager	Maj (U) Mohammad Alli Farid bin Ibrahim
Head coach	LCpl Hj Mohammad Yusof bin Hj Matyassin
Assistant coaches	Mohd Effendi Shah Hj Awg Md Jumat; Muhd Shazwan bin Othman
Goalkeeping coach	Sld Mohammad Tarmizi bin Hj Mat Johari
Assistant goalkeeping coach	Andy Affendy Matarsad
Fitness coach	Sgt Rismahnoor bin Hj Md Edris
Kitmen	LCpl (U) Mohd Abdin Shakirin bin Abdullah; Mahmud Wafiuddin Zhafir bin Md Isa

=== Team managers ===
chronology of team managers of MS ABDB FT
year	manager
2002	Lt Col Tarip bin Hj Karia
2003	Maj Puasa bin Ahad
2007	Lt Col Dr Hj Mohamad Baharin bin Hj Bintang
2008	Maj Zulkifli bin Hj Bujang
2009 – 2010	Lt Col Dr Hj Mohamad Baharin bin Hj Bintang
2011 – 2012	Lt Col (U) Suhaimi bin Jamali
2012 – 2013	Maj Azaman bin Hj Hussin
2014	Maj (U) Pg Mufid bin Pg Umar Ariffin
2014 – 2015	Maj (U) Pg Md Farisan bin Pg Hj Metassan
2015 – 2016	Maj (U) Razanol Hardi bin Abd Razak
2017	Maj (U) Hasnul Alwe bin Hj Matassan
2018 – 2019	Maj (U) Hj Asbi bin Hj Anuar
2020 – 2021	Maj (U) Muhd Nur Aidi bin Hj Abd Razak
2022	Maj (U) Muhammad Adif bin Haji Zaman
2023	Maj (U) Muhammad Yusra bin Awg Jafar
2023	Maj (U) Muhammad Adif bin Haji Zaman
2024 – 2026	Maj (U) Pg Md Qamarul Ehsan bin Pg Hj Hassan
2026 –	Maj (U) Mohammad Alli Farid bin Ibrahim

=== Coaches ===
chronology of coaches of MS ABDB FT
year	head coach
2003	Hj Md Daud bin Tudin
2006	Nordin Tujoh
2011	Steve Rule
2011	Sgt (U) Saipul Rizal bin Abdullah
2014	Sgt Saifful Rizal bin Awang
2015	LCpl Dahari bin Hj Yussof
2016	Cpl Pg Hj Hamzah bin Pg Hj Abd Rahman
2016	Bintara Hj Mesli bin Hj Dullah
2017	LCpl Dahari bin Hj Yussof
2018 – 2019	LCpl (U) Rosmin bin Hj Mohd Kamis
2020	LCpl Effandy bin Hj Seruddin
2021	LCpl Ak Safri bin Pg Hj Othman
2022 –	LCpl Hj Mohammad Yusof bin Hj Matyassin

=== Continental record ===
season	competition	round	club	home	away	aggregate
1985–86	ASEAN Champions Cup	Group Stage	(Malaysia) Malacca	0–1		5th
1985–86	ASEAN Champions Cup	Group Stage	(Indonesia) Yanita Utama	0–7		5th
1985–86	ASEAN Champions Cup	Group Stage	(Singapore) Tiong Bahru	0–2		5th
1985–86	ASEAN Champions Cup	Group Stage	(Thailand) Bangkok Bank	0–2		5th
1994–95	Asian Cup Winners' Cup	First Round	(Malaysia) Kuala Lumpur	0–2	1–5	1–7

=== Honours ===
==== League ====
- Brunei Super League
  - Champions (4): 2015, 2016, 2017–18, 2018–19
  - Runners-up (2): 2012–13, 2014

==== Cup ====
- Brunei FA Cup
  - Champions (7): 2003, 2007–08, 2009–10, 2012, 2014–15, 2015, 2016
  - Runners-up (3): 2002, 2004, 2005–06

==== Achievements ====
MS ABDB FT achievements
title	winners	runners-up
Brunei National	1985	
Brunei Super Cup		2003, 2004, 2008
Brunei League Cup	2006	
Brunei FA Cup (Note: See main article Brunei FA Cup regarding how the FA Cup before and after 2012 are treated as different competitions. ABDB officially has won four (4) DST FA Cups and three (3) FA Cups.)	2003, 2007–08, 2010	2002, 2004, 2005–06
Brunei DST FA Cup	2012, 2014–15, 2015, 2016	
Pesta Sukan Kebangsaan		2010
Sukan Kebangsaan Brunei Darussalam	2012, 2014	
Brunei DST Piala Sumbangsih	2014, 2016, 2017	2015, 2018
Brunei DST Super League	2015, 2016, 2017, 2018–19	2012–13, 2014
Piala Sumbangsih		2020

- Fair Play DST Super League: 2

2014, 2015

- Best Player DST Super League: 3

2014 — Sld (U) Mohammad Mazazizi bin Mazlan
2015 — Sld Abdul Azizi bin Ali Rahman
2016 — Sld Mohd Tarmizi bin Hj Mat Johari

- Top Scorer DST Super League: 1

2016 — Sld Abdul Azizi bin Ali Rahman – 8 goals
2017 — Sld Abdul Azizi bin Ali Rahman – 28 goals

==== Top scorer ====
chronology of top goal scorers of MS ABDB FT
year(s)	player	goals
2012 – 2013	Allahyarham Sld Budiman bin Jumat	7
2014	Sld Khairuddin bin Abd Kadir	8
2015	Sld Abdul Azizi bin Ali Rahman	14
2016	Sld Abdul Azizi bin Ali Rahman	8
2017	Sld Abdul Azizi bin Ali Rahman	28
2018 – 2019	Sld Muhammad Razimie bin Ramlli	12
2021	Sld Hariz Danial bin Hj Khalidden	5
2022	Sld Saiful Ammar bin Hj Adis	3
2022	Sld (U) Rahimin bin Hj Abd Ghani	3
2023	LCpl Muhd Hariz Danial bin Hj Khallidden	9
2024 - 2025	Sld Ak Mohd Alimuddin bin Pg Jamaluddin	7
2025 - 2026	Sld (U) Ak Muhd Ali Munawwar bin Pg Abd Rahman; Sld Mohd Saufi bin Salleh	5

==== Player records ====
===== All-time top goal-scorers =====
MS ABDB FT all-time top goal scorers
year(s)	player	goals
2012–2017	Sld Abdul Azizi bin Ali Rahman	61
2015–2019	Sld Razimie bin Ramlli	32
2009–2021	Sld Budiman bin Jumat	30

== Futsal team ==
Royal Brunei Armed Forces Sports Council Perwira Futsal Club
- Full name: Majlis Sukan Angkatan Bersenjata Diraja Brunei Perwira Futsal Club
- Nickname: armymen
- Short name: MS ABDB Perwira FC
- Founded: 1985; 41 years ago
- Stadium: Royal Brunei Air Force Sports Club, Rimba, Brunei-Muara, Brunei Darussalam
- Coach: Abdul Hapiz Untong
- League: Brunei Futsal League
- 2023: 2nd
- Website: https://www.instagram.com/msabdbfutsal/

The futsal team of the Royal Brunei Armed Forces Sports Council (MS ABDB) is known as the Royal Brunei Armed Forces Sports Council Perwira Futsal Club (Malay: Majlis Sukan Angkatan Bersenjata Diraja Brunei Perwira Futsal Club), abbreviated MS ABDB Perwira FC, and they are currently competing in the Brunei Futsal League. After winning the 2022 Brunei Futsal Cup, they participated in the 2022 AFF Futsal Cup (part of the ASEAN Football Federation or AFF) as representatives of Brunei, being knocked out after coming bottom of their group stage, conceding three losses from three games.

=== Achievements ===
MS ABDB Perwira FC achievements
title	winners	runners-up
Brunei Futsal League		2023
Brunei Futsal Cup	2022	
Sukan Kebangsaan Brunei Darussalam	2019	2012, 2015, 2017
Piala Keputeraan Futsal Championship		2019

== Badminton team ==
The badminton team of MS ABDB participates in local competitions, including the 2023 Super Smasher League Tournament in which they achieved first place.

== See also ==
- Royal Brunei Police Force Sports Council
- Sport in Brunei
- Brunei Rugby Football Union
- Ministry of Culture, Youth and Sports (Brunei)
