= Kota Ranger FC =

Bruneian football club

Kota Ranger
- Full name: Kota Ranger Football Club
- Short name: KRFC
- Founded: 1978; 48 years ago
- Stadium: Berakas Sports Complex
- Capacity: 500
- Owner: Abdul Razak Ibrahim
- Head coach: Syarafuddin Hamdi Talip
- League: Brunei Super League
- 2025–26: 3rd
Home colours	Away colours

Kota Ranger Football Club (Malay: Kelab Bola Sepak Kota Ranger; abbrev: KRFC), formerly Perkota, is a Bruneian football club, playing in the Brunei Super League. It was formed in 1978 and was successful in the late eighties and early nineties, winning the national championships twice. Kota Ranger directly translates to City Ranger in English.

Having won two national championship playoffs, a competition that pitted the four district champions against one another; in 1987 and 1993, Kota Ranger is regarded as one of the most successful clubs from that era. Kota Ranger FC, a dominant force in Brunei football in the 1980s and 1990s, and AM Gunners FC are two club names that may hint at some British influence on the local game.

== History ==
=== Early days ===
In the 1970s, Perkota was created by Alidon Laidin and his siblings of Kota Batu on the outskirts of Bandar Seri Begawan, overlooking the Brunei Bay. Before focusing on football and changing their name to Kota Ranger FC in 1978, the main sports were perahu racing, badminton, and sepak takraw. This was a result of their accepting players from outside the Kota Batu region as well. They participated in the national championships run by the Brunei Football Association and claimed silverware first in 1987, then secondly in a league championship in 1992.

Regionally, they participated in the 1987 Asian Club Championship and the 1992 Borneo Inter-Club Cup, winning the latter outright. A penalty scored by Momin Ahmad on the 22nd minute of the match between Kota Ranger and Persiba Balikpapan, brought the club to victory. They failed to qualify for the 1992–93 edition of the Asian Club Championship, despite having beaten PKNK F.C. from Malaysia in the first round. A few national players, including Liew Chuan Fue and Rosanan Samak of the 1999 Malaysia Cup team, were from Kota Ranger.

=== Decline ===
Kota Ranger was one of the founding clubs of the B-League in 2002. They were relegated after being in the last place with only one win during the 2004 Premier League, and spent time in the second tier of Brunei football until 2015, when they became league champions and promoted to the Brunei Super League. Norsillmy Taha scored the winning penalty which resulted in a 1–0 victory over Tabuan Muda.

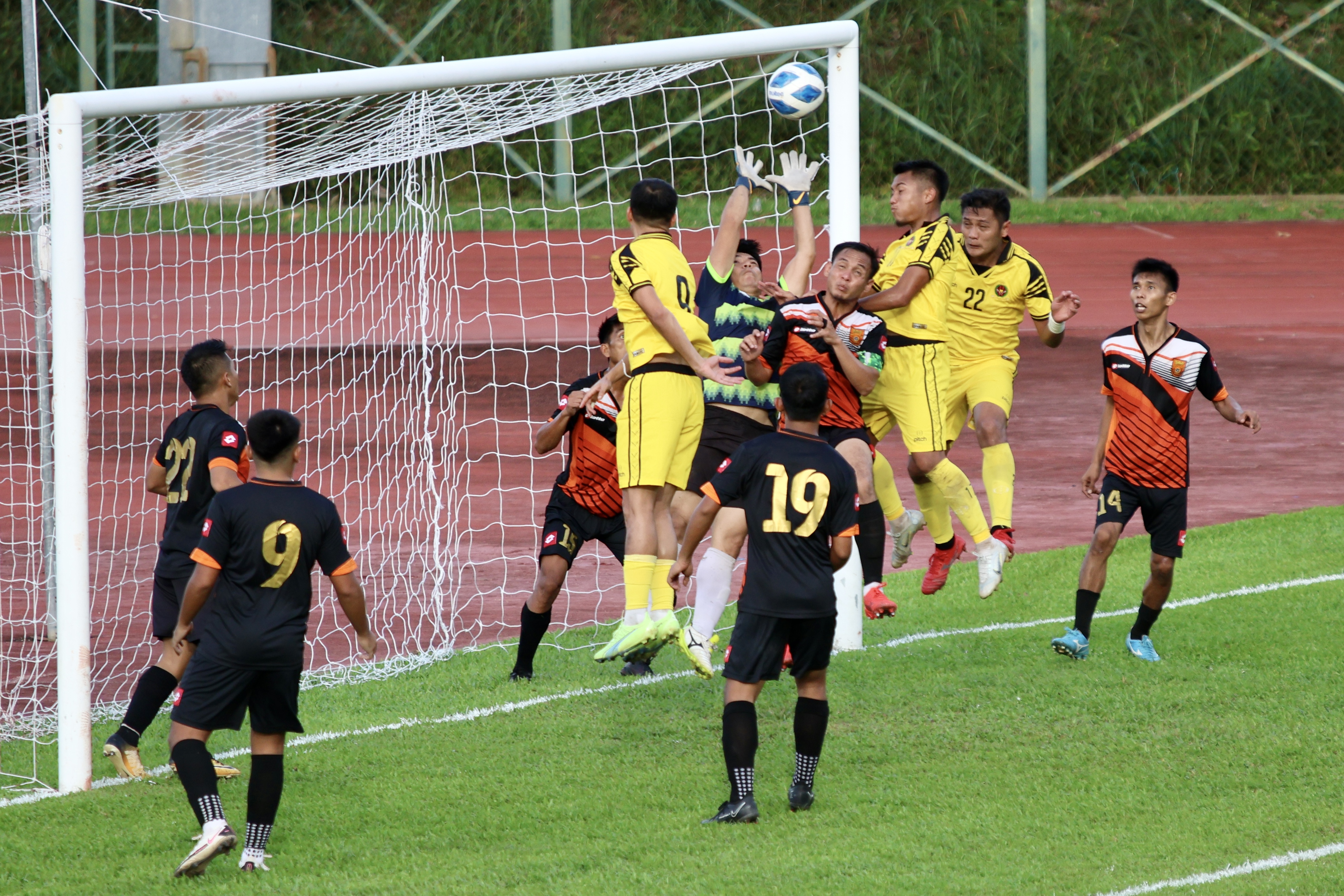
Clashes between Kota Ranger and DPMM FC players during the 2022 FA Cup.

=== Revival ===
Currently their best record in the competition is in the 2017–18 season when they finished runners-up to MS ABDB. In 2019, Kota Ranger claimed their first ever FA Cup triumph, beating MS PDB 2–1, the winner coming in the 89th minute via Nur Asyraffahmi Norsamri after Amir Bujang for the policemen cancelled out an earlier Amalul Said goal. During the 2020 Super Cup, the club went as far as winning the final match 3–1 against MS ABDB at the Hassanal Bolkiah National Stadium. Adi Said's debut followed by him scoring a hat-trick; on the 3rd, 44th and 90th minutes of the match.

The club was leading 1st place in the 2020 Super League when it was unexpectedly postponed and eventually cancelled due to the ongoing COVID-19 pandemic in the country, ending the tournament with only two matches completed. That following year, the restrictions were lifted and the club would participate in the 2022 FA Cup, Kota Ranger made it into the semi finals of the 2022 FA Cup after winning against KB FC in the quarter-finals. However, they would be defeated by DPMM FC with an aggregated score of 3–0.

== Current squad ==
As of 13 January 2026

Note: Flags indicate national team as defined under FIFA eligibility rules; some limited exceptions apply. Players may hold more than one non-FIFA nationality.

No.	Pos.	Nation	Player
1	GK	BRU	Hendra Putera Idris
2	DF	BRU	Hanif Omar Ali
3	DF	BRU	Kasyfil Anuar Zamain
4	DF	BRU	Abdul Aziz Tamit (Captain)
6	DF	BRU	Esmendy Brahim
7	FW	BRU	Azreen Eskander Sa'oda
8	MF	BRU	Amirul Zafrey Norshaney
9	MF	BRU	Hazmi Salleh
10	MF	BRU	Asnawi Syazni Abdul Aziz
11	FW	BRU	Sahfiq Hidayat Sahrizam
13	DF	BRU	Hirzi Zulfaqar Mahzan
14	MF	BRU	Hafis Mahari
15	FW	BRU	Syazwan Sahrin

No.	Pos.	Nation	Player
16	MF	BRU	Azim Izamuddin Suhaimi
17	DF	BRU	Aman Abdul Rahim
18	MF	BRU	Zainul Ariffin Mahdinee
19	DF	BRU	Alin Syahmi Hossaini
20	DF	BRU	Syaherrul Affendy Syahmirul Nizam
21	MF	BRU	Abdul Afiq Roslan
23	DF	BRU	Danish Danial Alfian
24	DF	BRU	Syam Sulaimi Jamahat
25	GK	BRU	Izhar Imran
26	MF	BRU	Sholihuddin Jamaluddin
27	FW	NGA	Muhammed Sa'ad
30	GK	BRU	Abdul Rashid Ibrahim

== Club officials ==
Position	Staff
Owner	(Brunei) Abdul Razak Ibrahim
Team manager	(Brunei) Zulkefly Duraman
Head coach	(Brunei) Syarafuddin Hamdi Talip
Assistant coaches	(Brunei) Eirwan Rais (Brunei) Hardi Bujang (Brunei) Sharazri Azamain (Brunei) Wahyuny Mustapa
Kitman	(Brunei) Asmadi Jalil
Medic	(Brunei) Shahrani Abdul Rahim

== Continental record ==
Season	Competition	Round	Club	Home	Away	Aggregate
1987	Asian Club Championship	Group Stage	(Indonesia) Krama Yudha Tiga Berlian	5–1		4th
1987	Asian Club Championship	Group Stage	(Malaysia) Federal Territory	1–8		4th
1987	Asian Club Championship	Group Stage	(Singapore) Tiong Bahru CSC	3–2		4th
1992–93	Asian Club Championship	First Round	(Malaysia) PKNK	1–1	5–1	6–2
1992–93	Asian Club Championship	Second Round	(Indonesia) Arseto Solo	1–1	1–2	2–3
1994–95	Asian Club Championship	Preliminary Round	(Macau) Negro Rubro	advanced		
1994–95	Asian Club Championship	Preliminary Round	(Philippines) Davao City	advanced		
1994–95	Asian Club Championship	First Round	(Hong Kong) Eastern AA	1–6	1–6	2–12

== Honours ==
- Brunei Premier League
  - Champions (1): 2015
- Brunei Super League
  - Runners-up (1): 2017–2018
- National Championship play-off
  - Champions (2): 1987, 1993
- Brunei FA Cup
  - Champions (1): 2018–2019
  - Runners-up (1): 2003
- Piala Sumbangsih
  - Champions (1): 2020
- Brunei National Championship
  - Champions (1): 1987
- Jasra Trophy League
  - Champions (1): 1988–89
- BAFA-Standard Chartered Football League
  - Champions (1): 1992
- Borneo Inter-Club Cup
  - Champions (1): 1992
- Piza Cup
  - Champions (1): 2005
- Piza Cup Charity Shield
  - Champions (1): 2006
- Joint Cup Championship
  - Champions (1): 2019
