= Brunei Super League =

Top-tier professional association football league in Brunei Darussalam

Brunei Super League Liga Super Brunei
- Organising body: Football Association of Brunei Darussalam
- Founded: 2012; 14 years ago
- Country: Brunei Darussalam
- Confederation: Asian Football Confederation
- Number of clubs: 13
- Level on pyramid: 1
- Relegation to: district leagues
- Domestic cup(s): Brunei FA Cup; Brunei Super Cup
- Current champions: Indera (2025–26)
- Most championships: MS ABDB (4 titles)
- Website: the-fabd.com/brunei-super-league
- Current: 2026–27 Brunei Super League

The Brunei Super League (abbr: BSL; Malay: Liga Super Brunei) is a professional league for men's association football in the sultanate of Brunei Darussalam. It is at the top tier of the Bruneian football league system, and it is managed by the Football Association of Brunei Darussalam (FABD).

The BSL championship winner will receive B$10,000 as prize money, in addition to a qualifying berth for the AFC Challenge League as Brunei's representative, provided that the winning club conforms to Asian Football Confederation (AFC) Club Licence criteria. The BSL runners-up will receive B$7,000.

== History ==
There has been a football competition in Brunei Darussalam since 1985, which was organised by the then Brunei Football Association (BAFA). In 2002, BAFA introduced a league competition known then as the Proton B-League.

In 2008, the Brunei government de-registered BAFA from its Register of Societies for failing to provide reports of its annual general meeting and other required documentation. Subsequently, a new football federation, the Football Federation of Brunei Darussalam (FFBD) was established. This irked FIFA, international football's governing body, and prompted FIFA to suspend Brunei's membership in September 2009 due to government interference. Subsequently, in May 2011, FIFA reinstated Brunei, recognising another football association, the National Football Association of Brunei Darussalam (NFABD) as its representative for Brunei Darussalam. This resulted in the abandonment of the 2011 Brunei Premier League (BPL) which was organised by the FFBD.

The NFABD reorganised the Brunei football league system, establishing a 'super league' as the competition's top tier (akin to the British Premier League, but mirroring the current league naming system of the Malaysia Super League), becoming the Brunei Super League (BSL; Liga Super Brunei, LSB). This was established after playing a preliminary competition, which decided the teams that was to form the new league. This became the 2011–12 Brunei National Football League, where thirty-two teams in four groups qualify for ten club places in the Brunei Super League.

The founding team club members of the Brunei Super League were: Indera, Jerudong, Kilanas, LLRC, Majra United, MS ABDB, MS PDB, Najip, QAF, and Wijaya.

== Current format ==
In the 2020 season, the league was expanded to sixteen club teams in accordance to FIFA, Asian Football Confederation (AFC), and ASEAN Football Federation (AFF) aspirations.

Players aged 35 years and over must produce a medical fitness certification to be registered for the league. Each match-day squad must contain a minimum of four under-21 players, with at least two u-21 players in the starting eleven.

At the end of each BSL season, the team champion is crowned. Any tiebreakers in the standings are subordinately classified in descending order: accrued points, goal difference, goals scored, head-to-head record between tied teams, goal difference between tied teams, goals scored between tied teams, and drawing of lots.

== Teams ==
The 2026–27 Brunei Super League season is contested by 13 teams.

- BSRC
- DPMM II
- Hawa
- Indera
- Jerudong
- Kasuka
- Kuala Belait
- Lun Bawang
- MS ABDB
- MS PPDB
- Panchor Murai
- Rimba Star
- Wijaya

== Championship ==
Brunei Super League season placings
Year	Champion	Runners-up	Third place
2012–13	Indera	MS ABDB	Majra United
2014	Indera (2)	MS ABDB	Najip
2015	MS ABDB	Indera	Najip I-Team
2016	MS ABDB (2)	Indera	Wijaya
2017–18	MS ABDB (3)	Kota Ranger	Indera
2018–19	MS ABDB (4)	Indera	Wijaya
2020	abandoned after round 2 due to COVID-19 pandemic		
2021	abandoned after round 7 due to COVID-19 pandemic		
2022	not held due to COVID-19 pandemic		
2023	Kasuka	Indera	Kota Ranger
2024–25	Kasuka (2)	DPMM II	Indera
2025–26	Indera (3)	Kasuka	Kota Ranger

=== Performance by clubs ===
Brunei Super League highest achievers
club	winners	runners-up	winning years
MS ABDB	4	2	2015, 2016, 2017–18, 2018–19
Indera	3	3	2012–13, 2014, 2025–26
Kasuka	2	2	2023, 2024–25
DPMM II	0	1	
Kota Ranger	0	1	

== Records ==
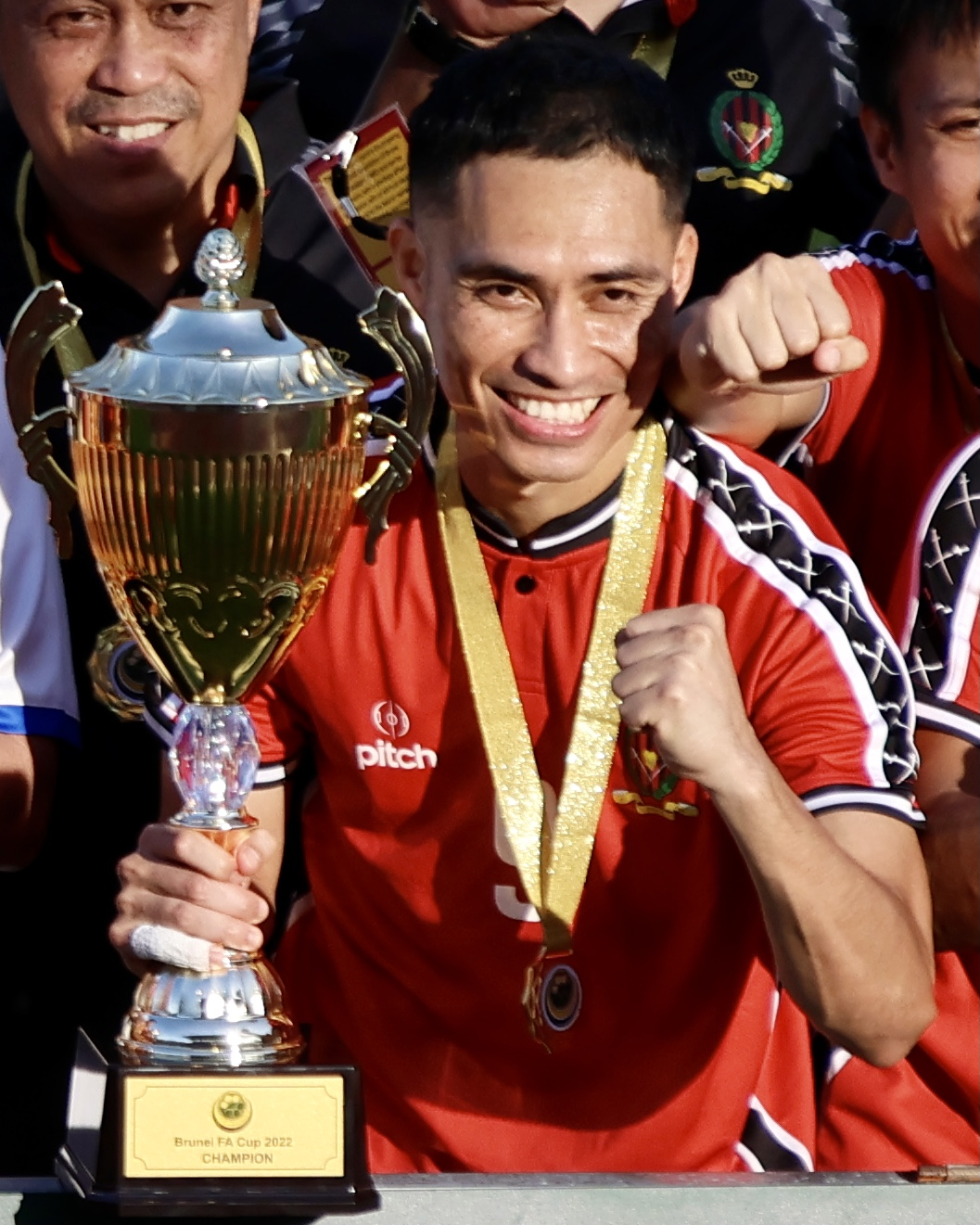
Abdul Azizi Ali Rahman (in home colours of the DPMM) being the top scorer of two BSL seasons.

=== Top scorers ===
Brunei Super League top-scoring players by season
season	players	team / club	goals
2012–13	(Brunei) Azwan Ali Rahman	Indera	17
2014	(Brunei) Zulkhairy Razali	Indera	11
2015	(Brunei) Hardi Bujang	Jerudong	18
2016	(Brunei) Abdul Azizi Ali Rahman	MS ABDB	8
2017–18	(Brunei) Abdul Azizi Ali Rahman (2)	MS ABDB	28
2018–19	(Brunei) Hanif Aiman Adanan	Kasuka	16
2021	(Belarus) Andrey Varankow	DPMM	23
2023	(Liberia) Leon Sullivan Taylor	Indera	31
2024–25	(Brazil) Willian dos Santos	Kasuka	35
2025–26	(Brazil) Pedro Alves	Kasuka	22

=== Best player award ===
Brunei Super League player award by season
season	player	club
2012–13	no award	n/a
2014	Mazazizi Mazlan	MS ABDB
2015	Abdul Azizi Ali Rahman	MS ABDB
2016	Tarmizi Johari	MS ABDB
2017–18	Haimie Abdullah Nyaring	Indera
2018–19	Nur Asyraffahmi Norsamri	Kota Ranger
2023	Adi Said	Kasuka
2024–25	no award	n/a
2025–26	Pedro Alves	Kasuka

=== All-time goalscoring record ===
As of 21 November 2026

Players in bold are still playing in the Brunei Super League. Players in italics are no longer active.

Brunei Super League overall player ranking by goals scored
Rank	Player	Period(s)	Club(s)	Goals
1	(Liberia) **Leon Sullivan Taylor**	2020–	Kasuka, Indera	77
2	(Brunei) **Asri Aspar**	2012–	Indera, Kasuka	65
3	(Brunei) **Abdul Azizi Ali Rahman**	2012–2018, 2025–	MS ABDB, DPMM II	64
4	(Brunei) Hamizan Aziz Sulaiman	2012–2026	Indera	59
5	(Brunei) **Razimie Ramlli**	2015–2019, 2021, 2024–2025, 2026–	MS ABDB, DPMM, DPMM II	54
5	(Brunei) **Adi Said**	2020–	Kota Ranger, Kasuka	53
7	(Brunei) **Abdul Azim Abdul Rasid**	2015–	Wijaya, MS PPDB, DPMM II	52
8	(Brunei) **Anaqi Sufi Omar Baki**	2012–2019, 2026–	Wijaya	42
9	(Brunei) Abu Bakar Mahari	2012–2014, 2016–2019, 2023	Jerudong, QAF, Kota Ranger	41
9	(Brazil) Willian dos Santos	2024–2026	Kasuka	41
