= Kasuka FC =

Association football club in Brunei

Kasuka
- Full name: Kasuka Football Club
- Founded: 1993; 33 years ago
- Ground: Hassanal Bolkiah National Stadium (selected matches)
- Capacity: 28,000
- President: David Kang Ming Fui
- Head coach: Halimi Abu Bakar
- League: Brunei Super League
- 2025–26: BSL, 2nd
Home colours	Away colours

Kasuka Football Club (Malay: Kelab Bola Sepak Kasuka) is a Brunei professional football club based in Bandar Seri Begawan that currently plays in the Brunei Super League, the domestic top-tier competition.

== History ==
=== Early days (1993–1998) ===
Due to the demand from the residents of Kampong Sungai Kedayan to play in the district league, Kasuka was founded in 1993. In the late 1990s and early 2000s, the club enjoyed a great deal of success. For the 1997–98 season, they won the Brunei-Muara District League and added the Police Cup (PRG) and Mukim Berakas Cup (Perbekal) to their collection of victories. By winning the District League Champions Cup, Pepsi Cup, and Community Shield of the District League in 1999, Kasuka added three more cups to their collection.

=== Further successes (1999–2008) ===
With the arrival of coach Moksen Mohammad in 2000, he would lead the team to win both the Brunei-Muara District League and the Pengiran Sengamara Di Raja Cup. According to Football Association of Brunei Darussalam (FABD), the club also won both the Mukim Kilanas Trophy and Md Amir PP competition in 2000. Under his guide, Kasuka continue to succeed with a 3–1 victory, against DPMM in the Malaysian Pepsi Cup that following year. Kasuka were one of the founding members of the B-League in 2002, where they ended the season in third place. They stayed in the top flight until the 2007–08 season when they withdrew from the competition with just two games left to play.

=== Reformation (2014–present) ===
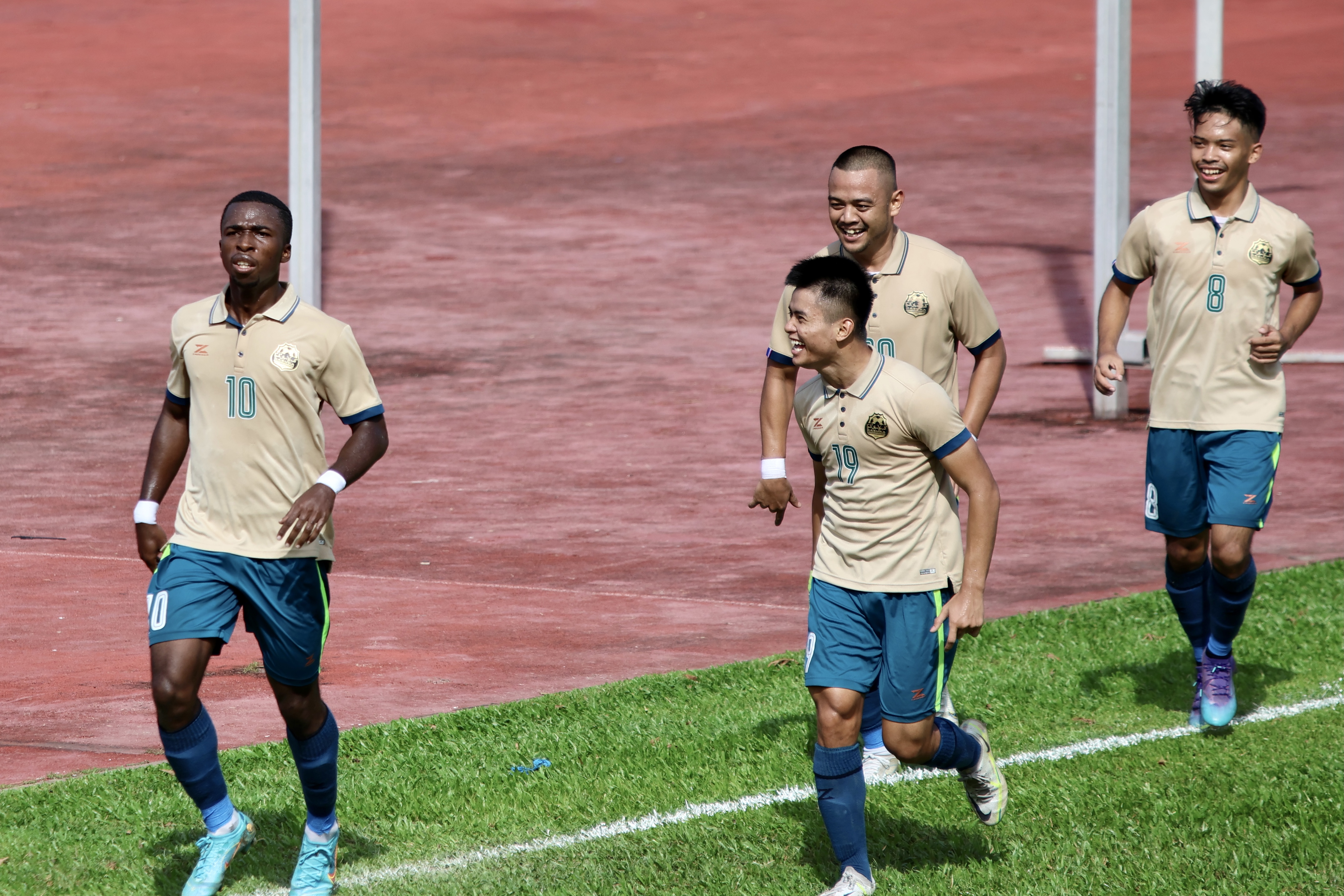
Kasuka players in celebration after Leon Taylor's goal against DPMM in the 2022 Brunei FA Cup Final

Kasuka reformed in 2014, winning promotion from the Brunei Premier League in 2015 into the Brunei Super League. They managed to obtain an AFC Club License in late 2020, in view of participating in the qualifying stages of the 2021 AFC Cup, by virtue of their second place standing in the 2018–19 season. On 7 July 2021, AFC announced that the ASEAN Zone matches of the 2021 AFC Cup were cancelled, denying Kasuka of their continental debut.

In the year 2022, Kasuka strengthened their ranks further with the acquisition of several talents such as Adi Said, Azman Ilham Noor and Khairil Shahme Suhaimi to mount a serious challenge for the 2022 Brunei FA Cup, the only FABD competition to be contested for the year. They were even touted to be the favourites to win the competition when it commenced. They managed to go all the way to the final on 4 December when Kasuka initially had an early lead after Leon Sullivan Taylor scored the first goal of the match in the 13th minute. Azwan Ali Rahman equalised deep in first half stoppage time and Shah Razen Said subsequently netted the winner in the 70th minute to hand Kasuka defeat at the last hurdle of the tournament.

==== Back-to-back league champions (2023–2025) ====
A year later, in preparation for the 2023 Brunei Super League they recruited talented import players as well as former DPMM players such as Shah Razen Said, Nur Asyraffahmi Norsamri and Hazwan Hamzah to make them favourites for the title. Tragedy struck the club in August when active squad member Abdul Halim Hassan died after a brief illness. After just 16 games into the season, the league abruptly ended, handing Kasuka the title with an unassailable lead at the top.

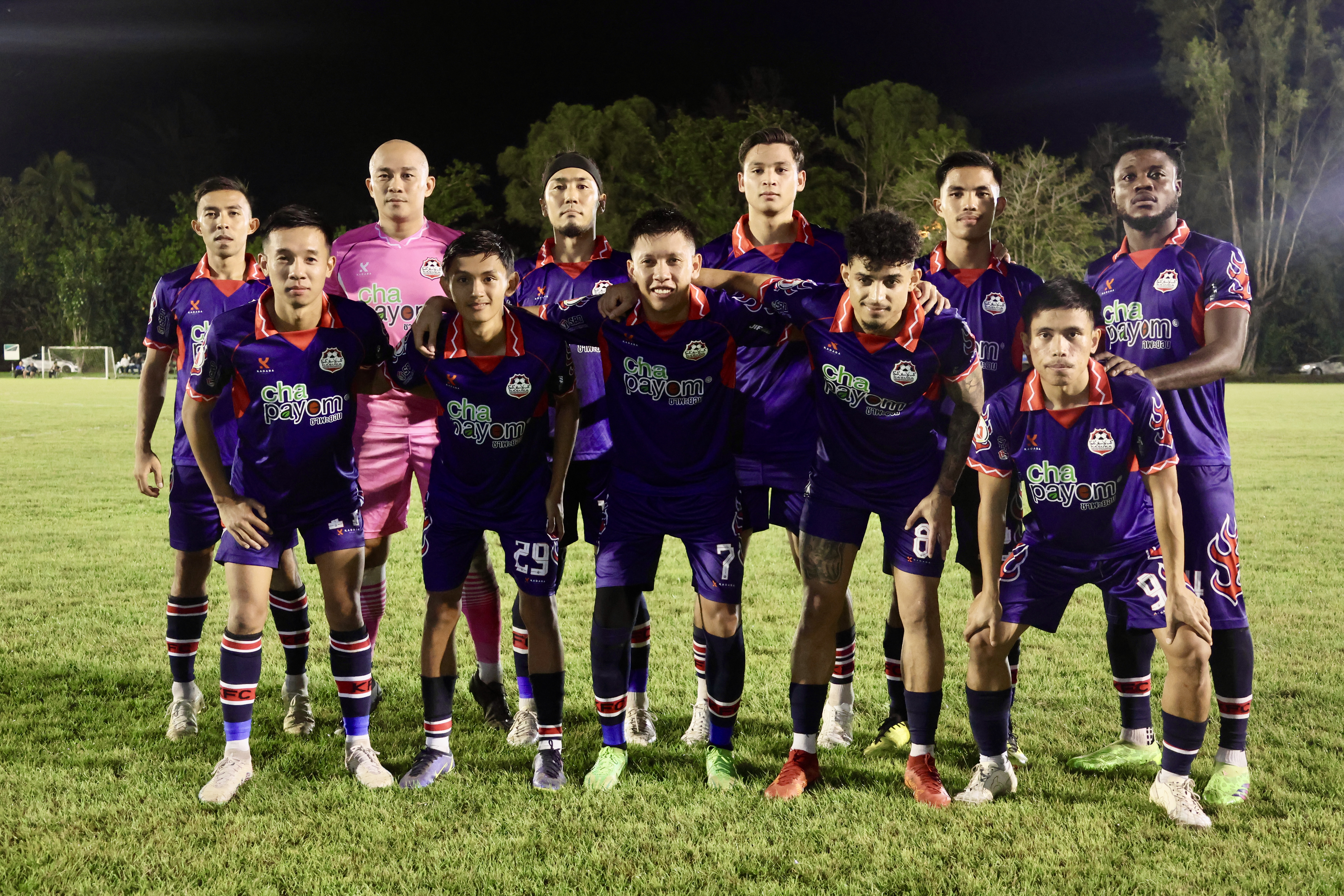
Kasuka starting line-up during the 2024–25 Brunei Super League match against BSRC

In May 2024, Kasuka announced their participation to the recently revived 2024–25 ASEAN Club Championship. They entered the qualifying play-off against Shan United of Myanmar in July where they were beaten 2–4 on aggregate.

In the first fixture of the 2024–25 Brunei Super League on 1 September 2024, Kasuka crushed Lun Bawang 9–0 to signal their intent to defend their championship title, despite the introduction of DPMM's second team to the league who are captained by Prince Abdul Muntaqim of Brunei. Both teams were winning all their matches until 24 November when Indera SC managed to force Kasuka to a 2–2 draw, which put DPMM II in pole position leading to their final fixture of the season on 2 February at Jerudong Park Mini Stadium. Kasuka, who needed a victory to become champions, managed to outscore their opposition 2–3 courtesy of a Willian dos Santos hat-trick, and thus became Brunei Super League champions for the second time in a row. Willian dos Santos also managed to win the season 'top scorer' awards with 35 goals. Kasuka then qualified to the 2025–26 AFC Challenge League qualifying play-off against Cambodian club Phnom Penh Crown and also the 2025–26 ASEAN Club Championship qualifying play-off against Philippines club DH Cebu. On 8 August 2025, Kasuka recorded an official win on the regional stage for the first time after defeating DH Cebu 2–1 during the first leg of the 2025–26 ASEAN Club Championship qualifying play-off where Jacob Njoku scored a brace for Kasuka. However, they were beaten 0–6 in the AFC Challenge League against Phnom Penh Crown four days later. They also lost the second leg of the ASEAN Club Championship qualifying 0–3, eliminating them out of the competition in a 2–4 aggregate score against the Filipino club.

==== Smashing records and first AFC competition (2026–) ====
In the middle of the 2025–26 season Kasuka became the only team to have won all of their matches when they faced newly-promoted side Hawa FC who were crowned the Belait district league champions the previous year, but were struggling at the foot of the table in the current campaign. Kasuka obliterated the side 26–1, producing a new record for the highest-scoring match in the Brunei Super League, which was previously held by Indera SC who beat Najip FC 20–1 in 2013.

Kasuka had won all of their matches until the final fixture of the league, a title-decider on 19 April 2026 against Indera who trail them by two points. Two goals from Akram Wakeel Bakri and a strike from former Kasuka hitman Leon Sullivan Taylor compounded them to a 2–3 loss, handing the league title to their opposition, ironically the same way they gained it the previous season.

Despite finishing second in the league, Kasuka entered the qualification rounds of the 2026–27 Shopee Cup and also the 2026–27 AFC Challenge League, due to Indera not applying for an AFC license. They were eliminated 2–9 on aggregate by Manila Digger of the Philippines in the former, but found success in the latter, winning 2–1 against Timorese side Karketu Dili on 15 September. In the AFC tournament proper on 18–24 October, Kasuka were defeated by Manila Digger again in their first match, followed by a 2–0 reverse to Shan United that sent them to an early exit from the competition. However, they memorably finished with a 2–1 victory over Hang Yuan in their final group game.

== Current squad ==
As of 5 September 2026

Note: Flags indicate national team as defined under FIFA eligibility rules; some limited exceptions apply. Players may hold more than one non-FIFA nationality.

No.	Pos.	Nation	Player
1	GK	USA	Jack Landreth
2	DF	BRU	Afi Aminuddin (Captain)
3	DF	BRU	Abdul Mu'iz Sisa
4	DF	GHA	Samuel Kojo Abbey
5	DF	BRU	Wafiq Danish
6	DF	BRU	Wafi Aminuddin
7	FW	BRU	Asri Aspar
8	MF	BRA	Jordan Kaique
9	FW	BRU	Hanif Aiman
10	FW	BRA	Eduardo Brandão
11	MF	BRU	Maududi Hilmi
12	FW	LBR	Leon Sullivan Taylor
13	FW	BRU	Arshyad Taqiuddin
14	MF	BRU	Haziq Kasyful
15	DF	BRU	Hazwan Hamzah

No.	Pos.	Nation	Player
16	MF	BRU	Khairul Anwar
17	MF	BRU	Nur Asyraf
19	MF	BRU	Alinur Rashimy
20	DF	BRU	Helmi Zambin
21	DF	BRU	Khairul Shahme
22	MF	USA	Jesus Salazar
23	MF	BRA	Pedro de Paula
25	GK	BRU	Wa'ie Haziq
30	FW	BRU	Adi Said
29	MF	BRU	Syafiq Hilmi
45	GK	BRU	Wardun Yussof
47	FW	BRU	Shaqeel Qays Wafri
55	DF	GHA	Stephen Halm
99	FW	KOR	Lee Seon-gyo

== Club officials ==
Position	Staff
Club manager	(Brunei) Matusof Mohamad
Club licensing manager	(Brunei) Adee Suhardee Muhidin
Team manager	(Brunei) Shariful Bahrin Zainal
Head coach Technical director	(Brunei) Halimi Abu Bakar
Assistant coach Fitness coach	(Brunei) Sairol Sahari
Assistant coach 2	(Brunei) Shahrin Zaini
Physiotherapist	(Brunei) Herdy Panjang (Brunei) Akram Zaini

== Performance in regional competitions ==
Season	Competition	Round	Club	Home	Away	Aggregate
2024–25	ASEAN Club Championship	Qualifying play-off	(Myanmar) Shan United	1–1	1–3	2–4
2025–26	ASEAN Club Championship	Qualifying play-off	(Philippines) DH Cebu	2–1	0–3	2–4
2025–26	AFC Challenge League	Preliminary stage	(Cambodia) Phnom Penh Crown	0–6		
2026–27	ASEAN Club Championship	Qualifying play-off	(Philippines) Manila Digger	1–4	1–5	2–9
2026–27	AFC Challenge League	Preliminary stage	(Timor-Leste) Karketu Dili	2–1		
2026–27	AFC Challenge League	Group stage	(Philippines) Manila Digger	0–5		3rd
2026–27	AFC Challenge League	Group stage	(Myanmar) Shan United	0–2		3rd
2026–27	AFC Challenge League	Group stage	(Chinese Taipei) Hang Yuan	2–1		3rd

== Honours ==
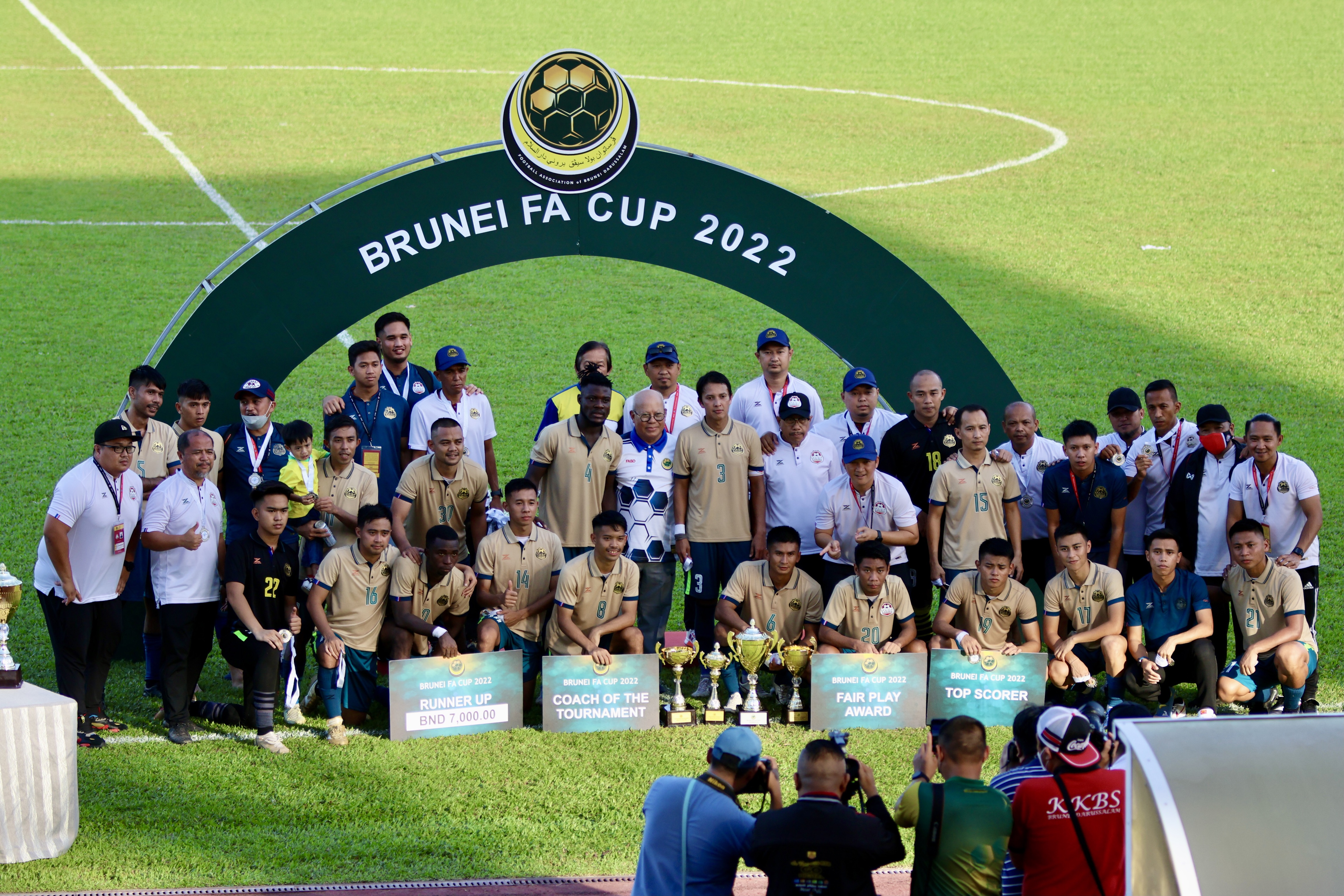
Kasuka came in runners-up at the 2022 Brunei FA Cup

- Brunei Super League
  - Champions (2): 2023, 2024–25
  - Runners-up (1): 2025–26
- Brunei-Muara District League
  - Champions (1): 1997–98, 2000
- Brunei FA Cup
  - Runners-up (1): 2022
- Pengiran Sengamara Di Raja Cup
  - Champions (1): 2000
- Mukim Kilanas Trophy
  - Champions (1): 2000
- Md Amir PP
  - Champions (1): 2000
- Brunei Pepsi Cup
  - Champions (1): 2001
- Brunei Police Cup
  - Champions (1): 1997
- Mukim Berakas Cup
  - Champions (1): 1997
