= Nur Asyraffahmi Norsamri =

Bruneian footballer (born 2000)

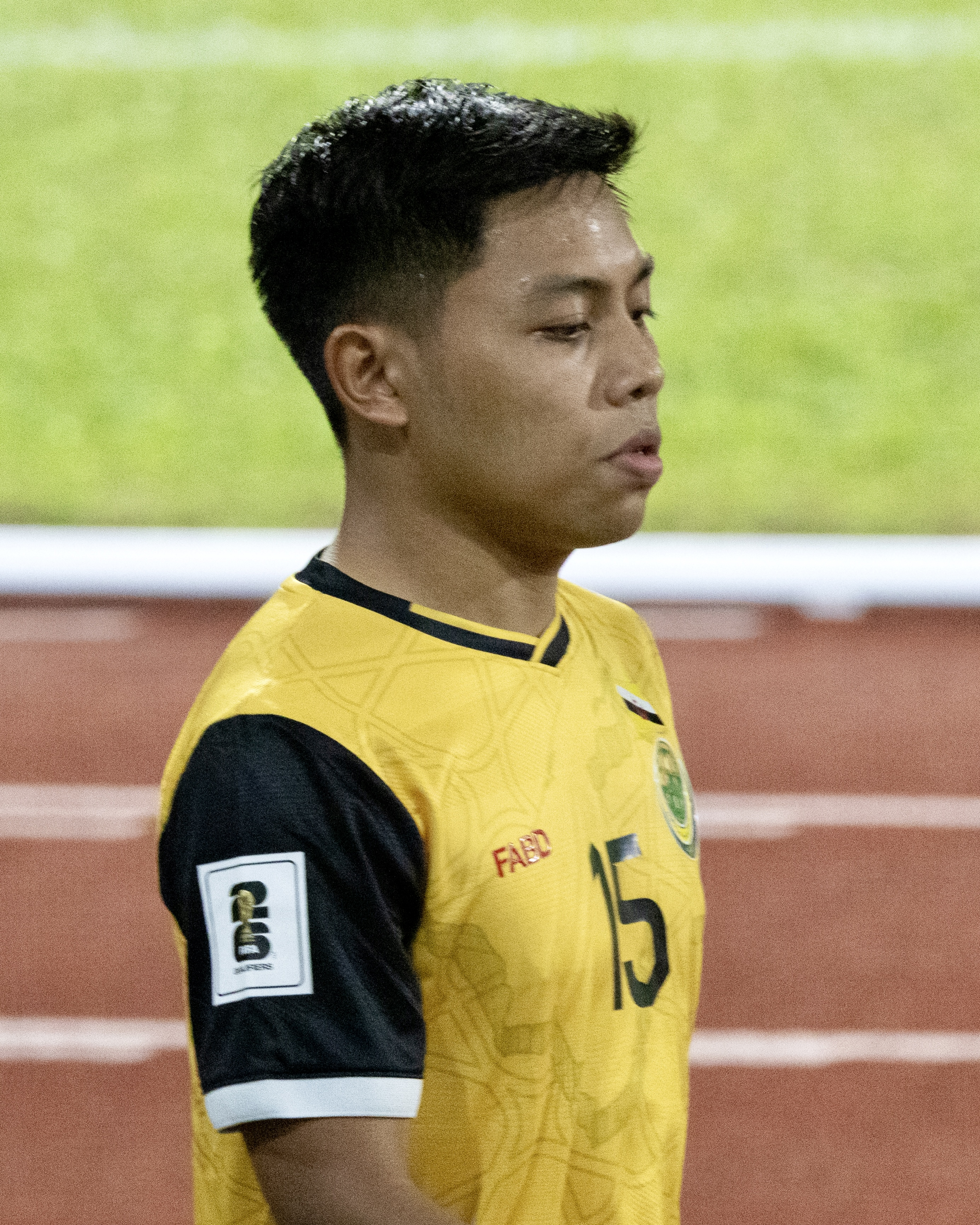
- Asyraf with Brunei in 2023

Personal information
- Full name: Muhammad Nur Asyraffahmi bin Norsamri
- Date of birth: 4 May 2000 (age 26)
- Place of birth: Bandar Seri Begawan, Brunei
- Height: 1.70 m (5 ft 7 in)
- Position: Winger

Team information
- Current team: Kasuka FC
- Number: 17

Youth career
- 2013–2017: Tabuan Muda

Senior career*
| Years | Team | Apps | (Gls) |
| 2016 | Tabuan U17 | | (2) |
| 2017 | Tabuan Muda 'A' | | (9) |
| 2018–2020 | Kota Ranger | | (11) |
| 2021–2022 | DPMM | 6 | (2) |
| 2023– | Kasuka | 18 | (6) |

International career^{‡}
| 2013–2015 | Brunei U16 | 10 | (0) |
| 2015–2017 | Brunei U19 | 12 | (2) |
| 2018 | Brunei U21 | 1 | (0) |
| 2019–2022 | Brunei U23 | 10 | (0) |
| 2019– | Brunei | 14 | (0) |
- * Club domestic league appearances and goals as of 4 November 2026 ‡ National team caps and goals as of 15 June 2026

Muhammad Nur Asyraffahmi bin Norsamri (born 4 May 2000), often known mononymously as Asyraf, is a Bruneian international footballer who plays as a right-sided winger for Brunei Super League side Kasuka FC and the national team.

== Club career ==
=== Tabuan Muda ===
Asyraf was with the national youth team setup ever since 2013 when he was sent to Myanmar for the 2013 AFF U-16 Youth Championship at the age of 13. His first league experience was the 2016 Brunei Premier League with Tabuan U17, finishing third in the league. He also had a hand in Tabuan U17's path to the FA Cup semifinals of that season with the winner against Jerudong FC in the previous round.

In the next year, Asyraf's age group was pushed up to the 2017–18 Brunei Super League as Tabuan Muda 'A' and he managed to score nine goals against the likes of MS PDB and Kota Ranger FC. However the Young Wasps finished sixth at the league's conclusion, and Asyraf's age group was disbanded in the following season.

=== Kota Ranger ===
Asyraf moved to Kota Ranger in the 2018-19 season, and this was the season when he finally emerged as one of the brightest talents in Brunei. He scored 10 goals for the season including a hattrick against IKLS FC on 16 November. In mid-season, he was invited to a trial at UiTM F.C. along with Azwan Ali Rahman. He then scored the winner in the final of the season's FA Cup to deliver Kota Ranger's maiden FA Cup triumph. In the final match of the regular season against champions MS ABDB, after an abandoned game in which he scored, he was crowned the Best Player of the league.

=== DPMM FC ===
On 11 June 2021, Asyraf put pen to paper to a contract with DPMM FC for the upcoming 2021 Brunei Super League, the only one yet to make his DPMM debut in the squad. He managed to do so on 27 June, in a 16–1 victory over BAKES FC. He scored his first two goals for his new club on 11 July against BSRC FC in a 13–0 win.

The following year, DPMM competed in the 2022 Brunei FA Cup and went all the way to the final where they beat Kasuka FC 2–1 to lift the domestic FA Cup for the second time in their history.

=== Kasuka FC ===
Asyraf departed DPMM after the 2022 season ended, and linked up with Kasuka FC of the Brunei Super League the following year. He scored four goals against Panchor Murai FC on 27 August 2023. The following month, Kasuka won the championship with an unbeaten record after the league was cut short by FABD.

After missing the whole of the 2024–25 championship winning season for Kasuka, he returned to the team on 21 February 2025 in a 2025 Brunei FA Cup fixture against Dagang FT and scored twice in a 15–1 win. In the following season, Asyraf missed out on another Brunei Super League medal, falling 2–3 against Indera SC in the title decider on 19 April 2026.

== International career ==
=== Youth ===
Asyraf is one of the few players who have progressed to full international level since Stephen Ng's first foray into developing Brunei's young footballers in 2013. His contemporaries include Amin Sisa and Nazirrudin Ismail. Taking over from Ali Ismail, Ng won his first game against Guam 4–1 at the 2014 AFC U-16 Championship qualification round held in Laos. Although Nazirrudin scored in that game, Asyraf was left on the bench.

Two years later at the July 2015 AFF U-16 Youth Championship, Asyraf played all five games at the group stage of the competition. The Young Wasps managed a draw against Timor-Leste, but lost the next four. Two months later, he was immediately promoted to the Brunei national under-19 football team along with several other under-16 teammates for the 2016 AFC U-19 Championship qualification matches in Myanmar. The age gap was proved to be too much as Brunei let in 18 goals in four games without reply.

Asyraf was called up for the Under-19s for a double header in 2017, namely the 2017 AFF U-18 Youth Championship and also the 2018 AFC U-19 Championship qualification in Myanmar and South Korea respectively. He played in all four group games at the AFF tournament, scoring against the Philippines (3–2) and Vietnam (1–8). The Young Wasps finished fourth in the table with three points. A month later in Paju, Brunei lost the first three games in the AFC tournament, but managed to salvage a 2–2 draw against Timor-Leste via goals from Abdul Hariz Herman and Hanif Aiman Adanan.

In 2018, Asyraf was selected to represent Brunei Under-21 for the 2018 Hassanal Bolkiah Trophy held in his home country in April. Coach Mario Rivera preferred to place Hanif Aiman Adanan on the right and Faiq Bolkiah as a lone striker, restricting Asyraf to only a single 45-minute appearance against Myanmar in the final group game. Brunei lost the crucial game 0–1 and failed to progress to the knockout phase.

Asyraf received his first Under-23 callup in March 2019 for the 2020 AFC U-23 Championship qualification matches held in Vietnam. He did not play a part in the first game against the hosts where Brunei were drubbed 6–0. He was given a start by Stephen Ng in the next game against Thailand in which Thai rising star Suphanat Mueanta also featured, resulting in a 0-8 demolition. Things had gotten better for Asyraf in the final game against Indonesia when he was tasked to take a second-half penalty five minutes from time after a foul on Azreen Sa'oda by Muhammad Riyandi. Asyraf had his penalty saved and slotted the rebound wide, but Riyandi was judged to step out too early resulting in his dismissal. Azim Izamuddin Suhaimi scored the retake to put Brunei back in the game at 2–1. Brunei would subsequently lose in dramatic fashion as Nazirrudin Ismail's stoppage time penalty was saved by the opposition striker Dimas Drajad to keep the three points to Indonesia.

In February 2022, he was selected for the Brunei U-23s taking part in the 2022 AFF U-23 Championship, in which he played in all three group games serving as vice-captain.

=== Senior ===
After an outstanding 2018-19 campaign for Kota Ranger, Asyraf was selected for the full national team by Robbie Servais for the two-legged 2022 World Cup qualification matches against Mongolia in June 2019. Asyraf started both games opposite of Nazirrudin at the right side of a 4-3-3 formation. Brunei lost 2–3 on aggregate in the end, eliminating the Wasps from the 2022 World Cup and the 2023 Asian Cup.

In 2022 Asyraf made appearances in three friendly matches against Malaysia away in Kuala Lumpur in May and both Maldives and Laos at home in September. Two months later, he started the first match against Timor-Leste in a 6–2 win for qualification to the 2022 AFF Mitsubishi Electric Cup on 5 November. He was a substitute in the second match which went 1–0 to the Timorese three days later, which resulted in Brunei advancing to the tournament proper with a 6–3 aggregate score.

After being overlooked for the 2022 AFF Championship proper, Asyraf regained back his form at club level which resulted in his return to the Wasps after June 2023. He featured in the entire four games of the national team in 2023, in friendlies against Sabah FC and Hong Kong as well as the 2026 World Cup qualification matches against Indonesia, all ending in defeats.

Asyraf was selected for the 2027 AFC Asian Cup qualifying fixtures against Yemen playing home and away in early October 2025. He made two substitute appearances as the Wasps were soundly beaten without scoring in both games. He returned to the national team for the final fixture of said tournament in March 2026 against Bhutan away in India, and started the match in a 2–1 defeat.

In June 2026, Asyraf played two games as a central midfielder against Timor-Leste at the 2026 ASEAN Championship qualification. The Wasps were eliminated 1–6 on aggregate.

== Honours ==
=== Team ===
Kota Ranger FC

- Brunei FA Cup: 2018–19
- Piala Sumbangsih: 2020

DPMM FC

- Brunei FA Cup: 2022

Kasuka FC

- Brunei Super League: 2023

=== Individual ===
- Brunei Super League Best Player: 2018–19

== Personal life ==
Asyraf graduated from IBTE with a National Technical Education Certificate in business and administration in 2019. He furthered his studies at Politeknik Brunei in 2021 and graduated with a diploma in human resource management three years later.
