= Hanif Farhan Azman =

Bruneian footballer (born 2000)

Hanif Farhan
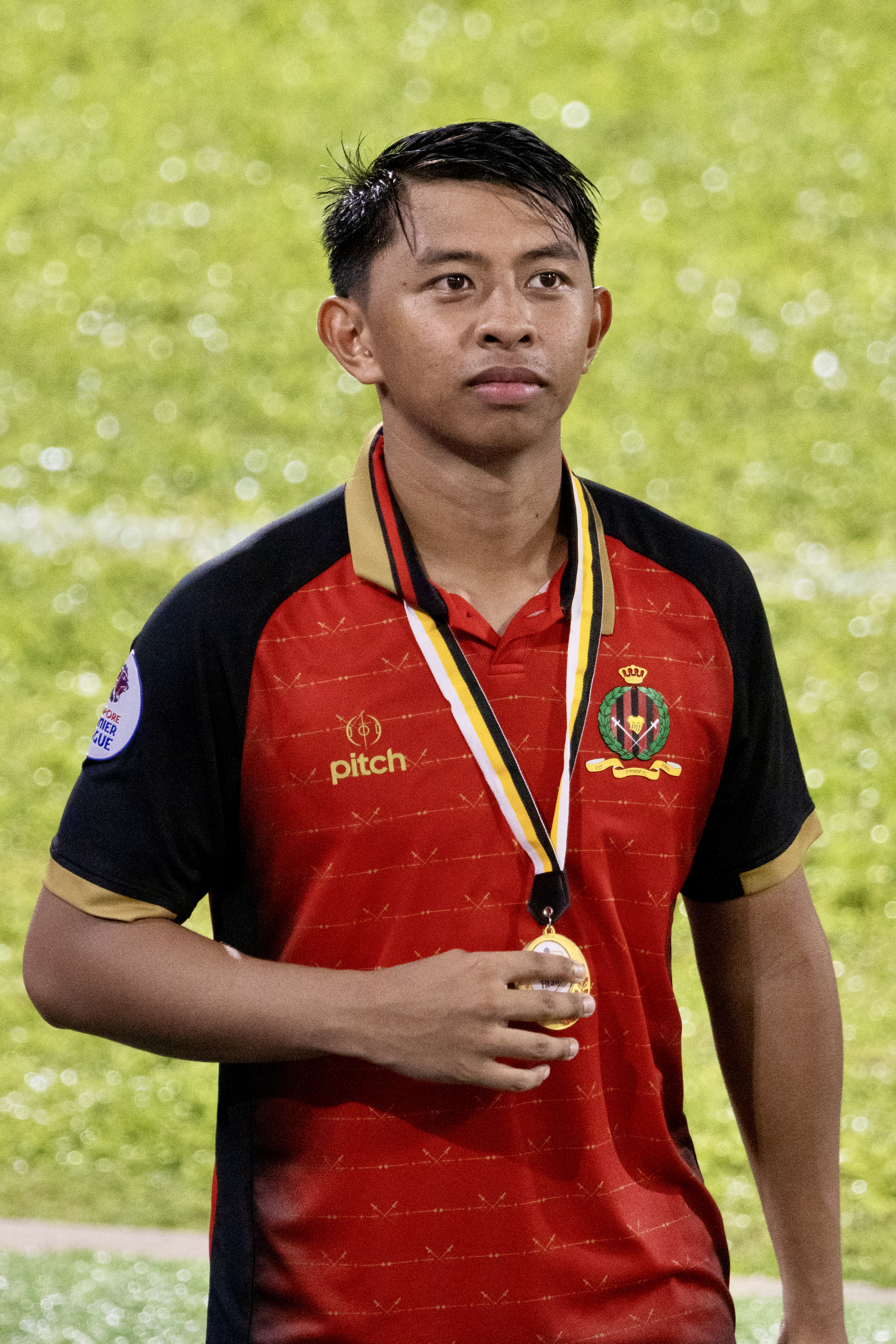
- Hanif with DPMM in 2024

Personal information
- Full name: Muhammad Hanif Farhan bin Azman
- Date of birth: 2 November 2000 (age 26)
- Place of birth: Brunei
- Height: 1.70 m (5 ft 7 in)
- Position: Midfielder

Team information
- Current team: MS ABDB
- Number: 13

Youth career
- PIP
- 2017–2018: Tabuan Muda

Senior career*
Years	Team	Apps	(Gls)
2017–2018	Tabuan Muda 'A'		(6)
2018–2019	Kasuka		(2)
2019	DPMM II		(1)
2020–2026	DPMM	61	(4)
2026–	MS ABDB	4	(0)

International career^{‡}
2017–2018	Brunei U19	11	(0)
2019	Brunei U23	8	(0)
2020–	Brunei	18	(0)
- * Club domestic league appearances and goals as of 3 November 2026 ‡ National team caps and goals as of 16 November 2026

Soldadu (U) Muhammad Hanif Farhan bin Azman (born 2 November 2000) is a Bruneian footballer who plays for Brunei Super League team MS ABDB and the Brunei national team as a midfielder.

== Club career ==
=== Early career ===
Farhan started his football development with Tabuan Muda, the youth team assembled by the National Football Association of Brunei Darussalam (NFABD) for international tournaments. He was placed in the 'A' team that played in the 2017–18 Brunei Super League, finishing sixth in the league with a personal record of six goals from left midfield.

Farhan signed for Kasuka FC in the first half of the 2018–19 season, along with fellow Young Wasp compatriots Hanif Aiman Adanan, Adi Shukry Salleh and Alinur Rashimy Jufri. He scored his first goal for Kasuka on his debut in an 11–0 demolition of Setia Perdana FC on 28 October 2018. He added to his tally two months later in a 1–1 draw with MS PDB.

=== DPMM ===
When DPMM FC held tryouts for a secondary team to play in the domestic league, Farhan grasped the opportunity and as a result was signed for the 2019 Brunei Premier League. He scored the winning goal against Rainbow FC on 19 February to propel DPMM towards the championship at the expense of Tabuan Muda. They were crowned as Brunei Premier League champions on 26 February after a 1–1 draw with said rivals. In the Brunei FA Cup however, they were unceremoniously dumped at the round of 16 by Kota Ranger FC, despite Farhan getting in the scoresheet.

At the start of 2020, head coach Adrian Pennock invited Farhan for trials with the first team and was largely impressed by what he saw. A month later, Farhan signed a contract to play for the main squad to compete in the 2020 Singapore Premier League, while converted into a central midfield role for his tenacity. He debuted on the starting eleven in DPMM FC's first match of the season at home to Tampines Rovers on 6 March, emerging victorious with a 2–0 score. It would be the only match DPMM would play for their 2020 season before withdrawing from the competition due to traveling issues exacerbated by the COVID-19 pandemic.

On 4 July 2021, Farhan scored his first senior DPMM goal in a 15–0 victory over Rimba Star FC. A year later, Farhan obtained a FA Cup winner's medal when his team claimed victory over Kasuka FC in the final of the 2022 Brunei FA Cup. On 25 June 2023, Farhan scored his first Singapore Premier League goal in a 6–0 win against Young Lions at Jalan Besar Stadium.

Farhan was released from DPMM at the end of the 2025–26 season, after making 14 appearances in DPMM's first season back to the Malaysia Super League.

=== MS ABDB ===
In September 2026, Farhan joined the football team of his employers the Royal Brunei Armed Forces at the start of the 2026–27 Brunei Super League season, alongside fellow released DPMM striker Hariz Danial Khallidden.

== International career ==
=== Youth ===
Farhan travelled with Tabuan Muda for the September 2017 AFF U-18 Youth Championship tournament held in Myanmar. The Young Wasps made a good start by beating the Philippines 3–2, but would lose heavily in subsequent matches against Vietnam, Myanmar and Indonesia. A month later the same squad embarked for South Korea for the 2018 AFC U-19 Championship qualification matches, placed with Indonesia, South Korea, Malaysia and Timor-Leste. Brunei at that time only managed one point after a 2–2 draw with Timor-Leste.

In June 2018, Farhan was in the Tabuan Muda squad for the 2018 AFF U-19 Youth Championship, hosted by Indonesia. The team eventually placed last in their group. Farhan was the provider of the only Brunei goal in the tournament in their last game, scored by Rahimin Abdul Ghani in a 7–1 loss to Myanmar.

Farhan's next excursion with the Young Wasps was to Vietnam for the 2020 AFC U-23 Championship qualification in late March 2019. He was a substitute in their opening match against the hosts which finished 6–0. He made the starting eleven for the other two matches against Thailand and Indonesia that also ended in defeats. Towards the end of the same year, he was selected for the 30th SEA Games football tournament in the Philippines. He played four games overall in a pretty forgettable tournament for Brunei, being sent off for two bookable offences against Singapore in the last group match.

=== Senior ===
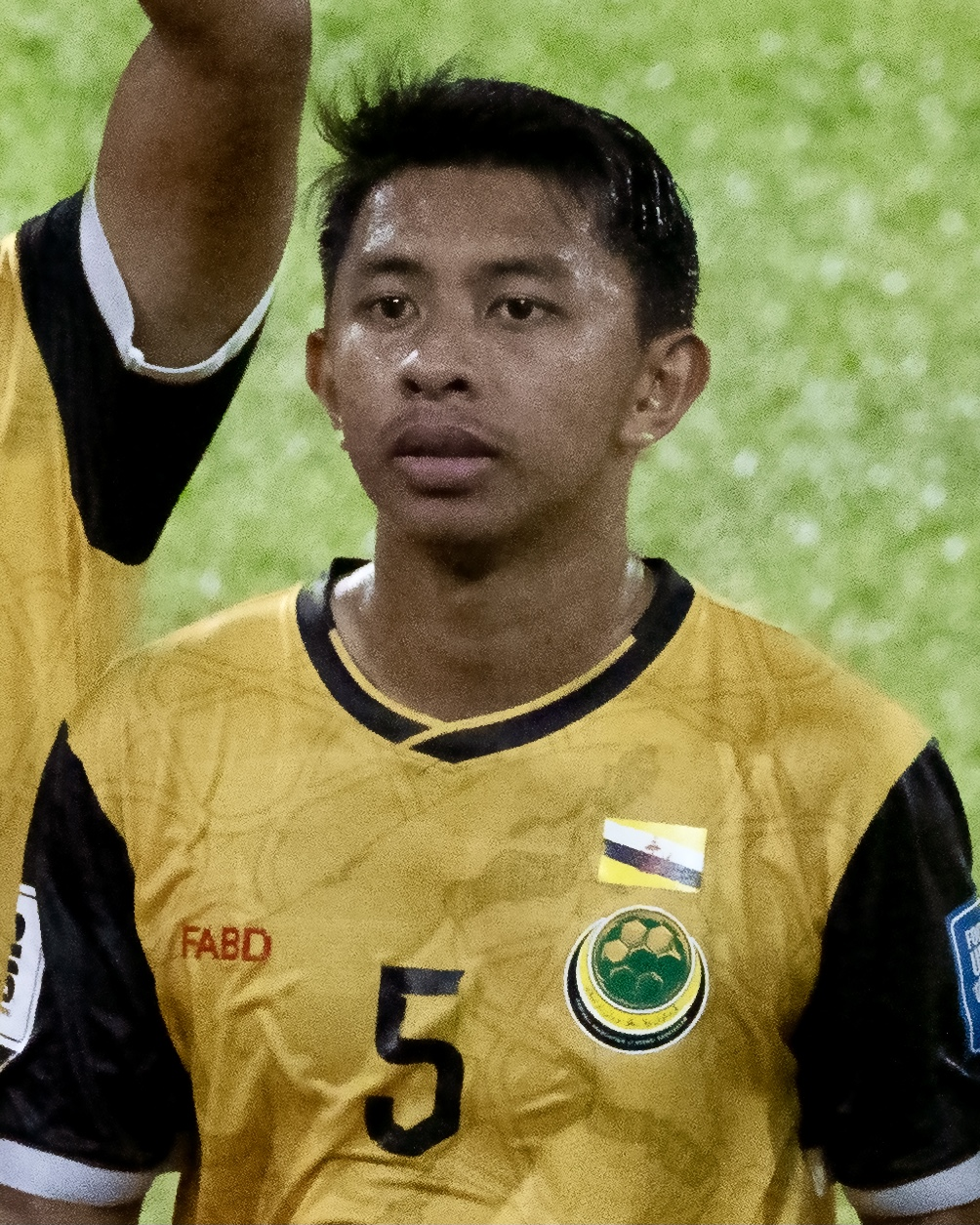
Farhan with Brunei in 2023

In October 2020, he was selected for the Brunei national football team for the first time. He made his unofficial Brunei debut in a 1–3 defeat to Sabah FC on 6 September 2023. His first cap came when he was a second-half substitute in a 0–6 defeat at the hands of Indonesia at the second leg of the 2026 World Cup qualification matches held in Bandar Seri Begawan on 17 October 2023. He made two further appearances for the Wasps at the 2024 FIFA Series held in Saudi Arabia against both Bermuda and Vanuatu.

In June 2024, Farhan played the whole 180 minutes in two friendly matches against Sri Lanka held in Bandar Seri Begawan. The Wasps claimed 1–0 victories in both matches. Later in early September, he was selected for the 2027 AFC Asian Cup play-offs for the qualification round against Macau in a two-legged affair. He made two appearances, starting the match in the second leg away in Taipa where Brunei won 1–0 on the night and 4–0 on aggregate, making them progress to the third round of the 2027 Asian Cup qualification. A month later, he took the field twice against Timor-Leste at the 2024 ASEAN Championship qualification, but this time the Wasps failed to advance to the tournament proper, losing 0–1 on aggregate.

Farhan was selected to go to Qatar in March 2025 for the first fixture of the 2027 AFC Asian Cup qualification, against group favourites Lebanon who have to play their home games in a neutral venue. He made the starting lineup in midfield supporting Abdul Hariz Herman and Azwan Saleh. The Wasps were defeated by a score of 5–0 to their Middle Eastern opposition.

In June 2025, Farhan made the starting lineup for both the friendly against Sri Lanka held in Thailand and the 2027 AFC Asian Cup qualification fixture against Bhutan. Although going down 1–0 at Bangkok, the Wasps rallied to a 2–1 victory at the Hassanal Bolkiah National Stadium where Farhan assisted the first goal for Nazirrudin Ismail as the set-piece taker. The following October, Farhan kept his place in the Wasps' centre midfield in a 0–2 home defeat at the hands of Yemen. On 18 November, Farhan played from the start against Lebanon at home for the fifth game of the 2027 Asian Cup qualifying and lasted the whole match in a 0–3 loss. He kept his place as a starter in the final qualifier away against Bhutan on 31 March 2026 which finished 2–1 to the South Asians.

After sitting out the 2026 ASEAN Championship qualification, Farhan returned to the side for the 2026 FIFA ASEAN Cup Division 2 held in Hong Kong that September. He made two appearances, starting the second match against Hong Kong in a 0–2 loss.

== Honours ==
DPMM

- Brunei Premier League: 2019
- Brunei FA Cup : 2022
