= Nazirrudin Ismail =

Bruneian footballer (born 1998)

- Nazirrudin with Brunei in 2024

Personal information
- Full name: Nazirrudin bin Haji Ismail
- Date of birth: 27 December 1998 (age 27)
- Place of birth: Brunei
- Height: 1.68 m (5 ft 6 in)
- Positions: Midfielder; forward

Team information
- Current team: MS PPDB
- Number: 10

Youth career
- Sports School
- 2013–2016: Tabuan Muda

Senior career*
Years	Team	Apps	(Gls)
2015	Tabuan U18		(0)
2016	Tabuan U21		(0)
2017–2020	Indera		(15)
2022	MS PPDB		(0)
2023–2026	DPMM	58	(7)
2026–	MS PPDB	3	(0)

International career^{‡}
2013	Brunei U16	4	(1)
2015	Brunei U19	4	(0)
2017–2019	Brunei U23	9	(0)
2018	Brunei U21	3	(1)
2015–	Brunei	28	(2)
- * Club domestic league appearances and goals as of 4 November 2026 ‡ National team caps and goals as of 1 October 2026

Nazirrudin bin Haji Ismail (born 27 December 1998) is a Bruneian footballer who plays as a midfielder or forward for Brunei Super League team MS PPDB and the Brunei national team.

== Club career ==
=== Tabuan Muda ===
Nazirrudin attended Brunei Sports School in his youth years. He was also a trainee with Tabuan Muda, the youth scheme of the National Football Association of Brunei Darussalam, from 2013 to 2016. He played for Tabuan Muda teams in the 2015 Brunei Premier League and the 2016 Brunei Super League.

=== Indera ===
Nazirrudin moved to league powerhouses Indera SC in 2017 and contributed three goals for Indera in the 2017–18 Brunei Super League season, the first one coming in his first league appearance in a 2–1 defeat to Tabuan Muda 'A'. He gained a Brunei FA Cup winner's medal by beating MS PDB in the final on 1 April 2018. He also won the following Sumbangsih Cup on 20 October.

In the 2018–19 season Nazirrudin stood out to become one of the most important players in the talented Indera side, converting to a left winger role opposite Aminuddin Zakwan Tahir and reaching double figures for goals scored. Finishing fourth in the table, Indera qualified for the 2020 AFC Cup as the highest team in the league that has obtained an AFC Cup Club License. Nazirrudin made his continental cup debut against Yangon United in a 1–6 loss on 22 January 2020.

=== MS PPDB ===
After sitting out of footballing action in 2021, he laced up for his employer's football team MS PPDB for the 2022 Brunei FA Cup. He scored two goals on his debut in a 9–0 rout of MSN United on 14 August.

=== DPMM ===
On 28 February 2023, Nazirrudin signed with DPMM FC for the 2023 Singapore Premier League season. He made his debut coming on for Hakeme Yazid Said in the 12th minute of stoppage time in a 3–4 loss to Balestier Khalsa on 10 March. He scored his first two goals for DPMM against Young Lions in a 0–2 win on 12 September.

On 19 July 2024 Nazirrudin was handed a starting place as a centre forward against Hougang United in the first match in charge of DPMM for Jamie McAllister, after Julio Cruz could not make it to the squad. In the 71st minute, he gathered the ball just outside of the penalty area and waltzed inside to shoot past Kenji Rusydi and score his first goal for the 2024–25 season. The match ended in a 1–1 draw at Hassanal Bolkiah National Stadium. Later in the season, he was brought on for Abdul Hariz Herman at the hour mark in the match against BG Tampines Rovers at the same venue on 22 September. He took advantage from a defensive lapse to score the equalising goal in the 85th minute, which helped DPMM to record their first win of the season at their home stadium after Miguel Oliveira scored the winner just two minutes later for a 3–2 final score. Towards the end of the season on 17 May, he also capitalised on two defensive mistakes by Tampines Rovers to score a brace in front of the home crowd in a 2–1 win.

After initially deputising for Hakeme Yazid Said at the start of the 2025–26 Malaysia Super League due to national service, Nazirrudin eventually returned to his familiar impact substitute role, altogether making 25 appearances mostly from the bench. At the end of the season, he was released by DPMM.

=== Return to PPDB ===
At the start of the 2026–27 Brunei Super League, Nazirrudin returned to MS PPDB, taking up the number 10 jersey vacated by Abdul Azim Abdul Rasid who transferred to DPMM II. He made his re-debut against last season's champions and former side Indera SC on 14 September 2026 in a 0–2 defeat.

== International career ==
=== Youth ===
Nazirrudin's first international tournament was the 2014 AFC U-16 Championship qualification matches held in Laos in September 2013, under new Brunei Under-16s coach Stephen Ng Heng Seng. He scored on his debut in a 4–1 victory over Guam, but the team were subsequently handed defeats by Malaysia, South Korea and hosts Laos.

Nazirrudin laced up for the Brunei under-19s at the 2015 AFF U-19 Youth Championship in August of that year. He made two starts and four total appearances in as many games, all ending in defeat.

In 2017, Nazirrudin was chosen for the Brunei under-23 squad competing in the 2018 AFC U-23 Championship qualification matches in July 2017 and the 29th SEA Games the following month. For the AFC qualifying tournament held in Myanmar, he played only the first match against Australia in a 2–0 loss. He was largely on the sidelines for the SEA Games tournament, making his only start in the dead rubber match against Singapore, which ended in a 1–0 loss.

Nazirrudin played with the Brunei under-21s as hosts of the 2018 Hassanal Bolkiah Trophy in April, featuring in all of their games. In the second group game against Thailand, he came on in the second half and scored the winner in a 2–1 victory. Nevertheless, two slim defeats in the other games meant that the Young Wasps were eliminated in the group stage of the competition.

In 2019, Nazirrudin was selected for the under-23s for the 2020 AFC U-23 Championship qualification matches held in Vietnam in March 2019. He was overlooked for Abdul Hariz Herman in the first two games which were heavy defeats to Vietnam and Thailand. He started the final game against Indonesia national under-23 football team and after substitute Azim Izamuddin Suhaimi scored a penalty to make the game 2–1 with five minutes from normal time remaining and Garuda Muda reduced to 10 men after the dismissal of their goalkeeper, Nazirrudin elected to take a penalty deep in injury time against replacement goalkeeper Dimas Drajad and had his effort saved by the opposition striker.

At the end of 2019 Nazirrudin was called up for the 30th SEA Games in the Philippines from November to December 2019. The team featured Faiq Bolkiah as captain and Adi Said as the main attacking player, with the young prodigy Hakeme Yazid Said also brought into the squad. Ultimately the team failed to gel and suffered five embarrassing defeats at the group stage, with the final fixture being a 7–0 mauling by Singapore, half of the goals coming in the last five minutes.

=== Senior ===
While still being in the Tabuan Muda under-18s setup, Nazirrudin was invited to train with the second-string national side to face Singapore on 6 June 2015 which ended 5–1 to the Lions.

Nazirrudin was selected for the full national team at the 2022 World Cup qualification matches against Mongolia in June 2022. He made his international debut right from the start in the first leg, which was a 2–0 defeat in Ulaanbaatar. Five days later in the return leg, Nazirrudin kept his place as Brunei won the game 2–1 but was eliminated from the 2022 World Cup and the 2023 Asian Cup on aggregate.

Missing out on national team call-ups in early 2022, Nazirrudin finally returned to the side in September 2022 for a tri-nation tournament involving the Maldives and Laos hosted by Brunei. He came on for Nur Asyraffahmi Norsamri in the second half in a 0–3 loss to the Maldives on 21 September. He started the next game against Laos six days later, and capitalised on a mistake by debutant Phounin Xayyasone to score the only goal of the match, which was also his first international goal, bringing new head coach Mario Rivera his first victory. He made the starting eleven for the second match against Timor-Leste at the 2022 AFF Mitsubishi Electric Cup qualification held in Brunei in early November. Brunei recorded a 6–3 aggregate win to progress to the tournament proper the following month. He was brought on as a substitute against the Philippines on 23 December in a 5–1 defeat. He then made the starting lineup in the games against Indonesia and Cambodia, both ending in losses for the Wasps.

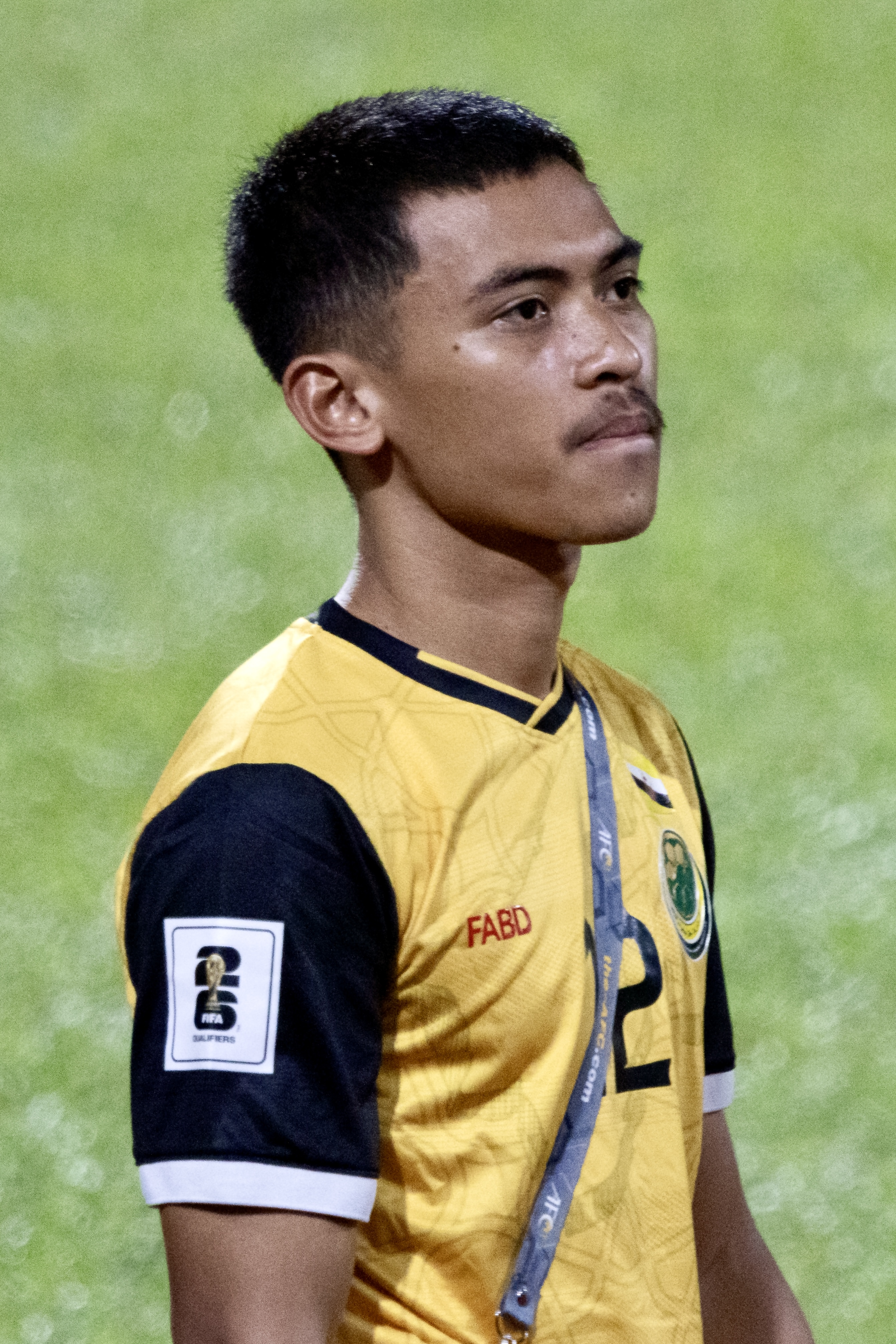
Nazirrudin with Brunei in 2023

In September 2023, Nazirrudin was selected by the national team for the friendlies against Sabah FC at the Track & Field Sports Complex as well as the away fixture against Hong Kong national football team, and made the starting lineup in both games. A month later, he was included in the 25-man Brunei squad to face Indonesia in a two-legged fixture to advance into the next round of the 2026 World Cup. He started the first leg on 12 October and lasted for an hour as the Garuda rallied to a 6–0 victory, scoring four goals only after Nazirrudin left the field.

In March 2024 Nazirrudin joined the Brunei squad to participate in the first ever FIFA Series, their group hosted by Saudi Arabia. Sitting out their first game against Bermuda, he was introduced in the second half against Vanuatu with the score poised at 1–1. The game finished 3–2 to the Wasps after a Hakeme free-kick goal in the second minute of injury time. The following June, Nazirrudin started the game in both friendlies against Sri Lanka, where the Wasps managed twin 1–0 victories.

Nazirrudin was selected for the 2027 Asian Cup play-off round for the competition's third qualifying round, in a two-legged tie with Macau in early September 2024. He was a starter in both legs, contributing to the team's 4–0 aggregate victory and subsequent qualification. One month later, he was part of the attacking lineup against Timor-Leste at the 2024 ASEAN Championship qualification, which the Timorese prevailed 0–1 on aggregate.

Nazirrudin's next outing in the yellow jersey was in March 2025 when he was in the Brunei selection under Fabio Maciel to face Lebanon at the 2027 AFC Asian Cup qualifying in Doha, Qatar. He partnered the returning Adi Said in attack, however the team succumbed to a 5–0 defeat. Three months later, he was deployed up front partnering Hariz Danial Khallidden for the next Asian Cup qualifying match against Bhutan and scored the opening goal, a precision strike from just outside the box after a layoff by Hanif Farhan Azman as part of a set-piece routine. The Wasps were victorious in front of the home crowd with a 2–1 score.

In October 2025 Nazirrudin was chosen to lead the line for Brunei against Yemen for two matches home and away at the 2027 Asian Cup qualifying third round. Unfortunately the Wasps were beaten 0–2 at home and also 9–0 away in Kuwait. A month later, he kept his place in the starting lineup at home against Lebanon, partnering the returning Hakeme Yazid Said. Once again, Brunei lost 0–3 against the Cedars. In the final Asian Cup qualification group match against Bhutan on 31 March 2026, Nazir partnered clubmate Hariz Danial Khallidden up front, both players lasted 70 minutes in a 2–1 defeat.

In June 2026, Nazirrudin was selected for the 2026 ASEAN Championship qualification matches against Timor-Leste and made two appearances as a substitute in a 1–6 aggregate loss. He doubled that appearance count at the 2026 FIFA ASEAN Cup in September, featuring in losses against Laos and Hong Kong.

== Career statistics ==
=== International ===
Scores and results list Brunei's goal tally first, score column indicates score after each Nazirrudin goal.

No.	Date	Venue	Opponent	Score	Result	Competition
1.	27 September 2022	Track & Field Sports Complex, Bandar Seri Begawan, Brunei	Laos	1–0	1–0	Friendly
2.	10 June 2025	Hassanal Bolkiah National Stadium, Bandar Seri Begawan, Brunei	Bhutan	1–0	2–1	2027 AFC Asian Cup qualification

== Personal life ==
Nazirrudin has an elder brother Nizamuddin who plays for MS PPDB and had been a Brunei youth international.

== Honours ==
Indera SC

- Brunei FA Cup: 2017–18
- Piala Sumbangsih: 2019
