= Nazhan Zulkifle =

Bruneian footballer (born 2001)

Nazhan
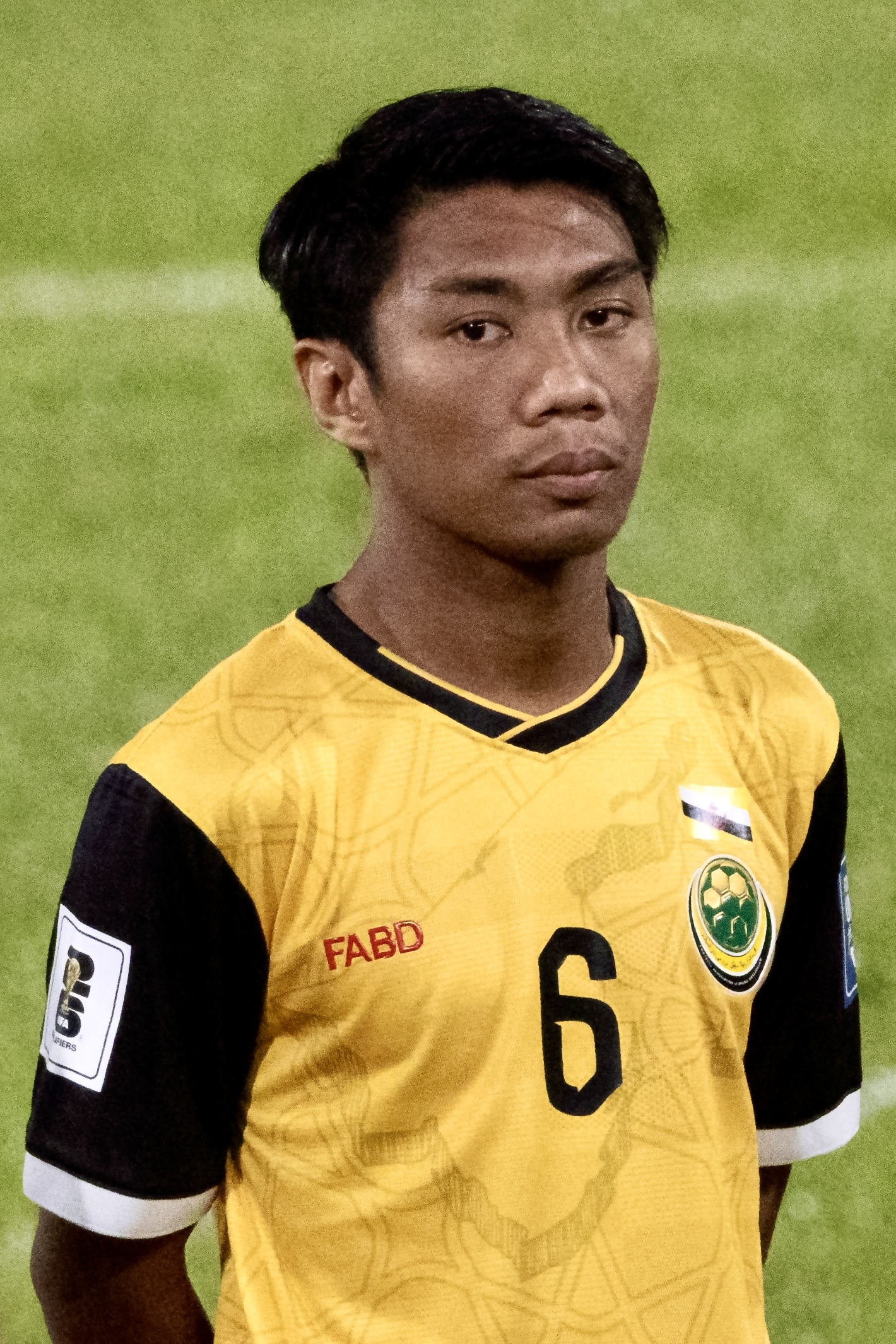
- Nazhan with Brunei in 2023

Personal information
- Full name: Muhammad Nazhan bin Zulkifle
- Date of birth: 17 January 2001 (age 25)
- Place of birth: Brunei
- Height: 1.64 m (5 ft 5 in)
- Position: Defender

Youth career
- 2016–2018: Tabuan Muda

Senior career*
Years	Team	Apps	(Gls)
2017	Tabuan Muda 'B'		
2018–2026	Kasuka		(4)

International career^{‡}
2016	Brunei U16	4	(0)
2017–2019	Brunei U19	20	(0)
2018	Brunei U21	0	(0)
2022	Brunei U23	7	(0)
2020–2025	Brunei	6	(0)
- * Club domestic league appearances and goals as of 7 October 2026 ‡ National team caps and goals as of 16 October 2026

Muhammad Nazhan bin Zulkifle (born 17 January 2001) is a Bruneian footballer who plays as a defender.

== Club career ==
Since 2016, Nazhan has been a regular of his age group in Tabuan Muda, the national youth scheme formed by the National Football Association of Brunei Darussalam in preparation for international tournaments. He played league football for the 'B' team of Tabuan Muda in the 2017 Brunei Premier League.

Nazhan signed for Kasuka FC in the 2018–19 Brunei Super League as one of several established Brunei youth internationals snapped up by the ambitious club. He scored his first league goal on his debut in a 11–0 victory against Setia Perdana on 28 October 2018. He also captained Kasuka's Under-19 team that played in the national youth league. The team reached second place that season and was awarded an AFC Cup berth for the 2021 edition after securing an AFC club license, but their qualifying matches were ultimately cancelled due to the COVID-19 pandemic.

On 4 December 2022, Nazhan reached the final of the 2022 Brunei FA Cup with Kasuka, where they lost to DPMM FC by 2–1 in regular time. The next year saw Nazhan's team dominating the league and finishing in first place, handing Nazhan his first taste of silverware. Kasuka repeated the feat the following season in dramatic fashion, clinching the title in their last fixture against table toppers DPMM II in a 2–3 victory.

== International career ==
=== Youth ===
Nazhan's first international tournament in Brunei colours was the 2016 AFF U-16 Youth Championship held in Cambodia in July, where he played in all four fixtures, three from the start. Brunei lost all of their matches without scoring a goal, although they managed to keep the scoreline respectable with no more than four goals conceded per match. Then in late 2017, Nazhan was selected for both the 2017 AFF U-18 Youth Championship hosted by Myanmar in September and the 2018 AFC U-19 Championship qualification matches held in South Korea the following November. In the first match for the AFF tournament, Nazhan was a late defensive substitute for a 2–3 victory against the Philippines. He was brought on in different circumstances in the second game, which was a 1–8 defeat against Vietnam. He was given a start in the third game against Myanmar but was taken off early in the second half, and that ended his involvement for the rest of the tournament after said 7–0 loss. Two months later in Paju, South Korea, Nazhan played in all four matches of the group stage of the AFC qualifying tournament, two from the start including a 0–11 defeat to the host country. He was a second-half substitute in the final game which was a 2–2 draw against Timor-Leste.

Nazhan was a squad member for the April 2018 Hassanal Bolkiah Trophy with the under-21s but did not take the field. He was back with the under-19s for the 2018 AFF U-19 Youth Championship a few months later in Indonesia, playing in all of the matches as Brunei ended the tournament without a single point.

Nazhan was named as a member of the Brunei Under-23s playing in the 2022 AFF U-23 Championship held in Cambodia in February. He started the first game which was a 6–0 defeat at the hands of the host team, it was to be the extent of his involvement for the rest of the tournament. A year later, Nazhan captained the side for the 2023 edition of the tournament in August, however he made just one start against Thailand, where the valiant Young Wasps lost by only three goals to nil. In the game, he was struck in the face by Nethithorn Kaewcharoen who attempted a bicycle kick while Nazhan connected to the ball first right before half-time. He kept the armband for the 2024 AFC U-23 Asian Cup qualification matches held in Jordan the following month, and played three times, suffering three defeats.

=== Senior ===
After having been invited to training camps in 2020, Nazhan received a callup for the full national team in March 2022 for the international friendly against Laos away in Vientiane. He was a substitute in the fixture, replacing Abdul Azizi Ali Rahman for his international debut. The match ended 3–2 to the home team. Six months later, he faced the same opposition at home in a tri-nations tournament on 27 September. This time around, the Wasps produced a 1–0 victory.

Nazhan was recalled to the full national team at the two-legged 2026 World Cup qualification matches against Indonesia in October 2023. He played from the start at right-back in the first leg away at Gelora Bung Karno Stadium in Jakarta on 12 October where trailing by 2–0 Nazhan fouled the marauding Sandy Walsh at the edge of the penalty box. Ramadhan Sananta scored the ensuing penalty and in the end, Indonesia won by six unanswered goals. Nazhan similarly started the game five days later at the return leg in Bandar Seri Begawan, which finished by the same scoreline to Indonesia, knocking Brunei out of the global competition in a 0–12 aggregate.

Nazhan returned to the national team in October 2025 when Fabio Maciel called up the Kasuka defender for the 2027 AFC Asian Cup qualification matches against Yemen. He appeared as a late substitute in the first match at home on 9 October, which ended 0–2. He was given a place in the starting lineup in the second match five days later in Kuwait City on the left wingback position, replacing club compatriot Alinur Rashimy Jufri. This time the designated home team won by a 9–0 scoreline.

== Honours ==
Kasuka FC

- Brunei Super League (2): 2023, 2024–25

== Personal life ==
Nazhan is a graduate of the Laksamana College of Business in Bandar Seri Begawan who won a national inter-college football tournament in 2021 as their representative.
