= Alinur Rashimy Jufri =

Bruneian footballer (born 2000)

Alinur Rashimy
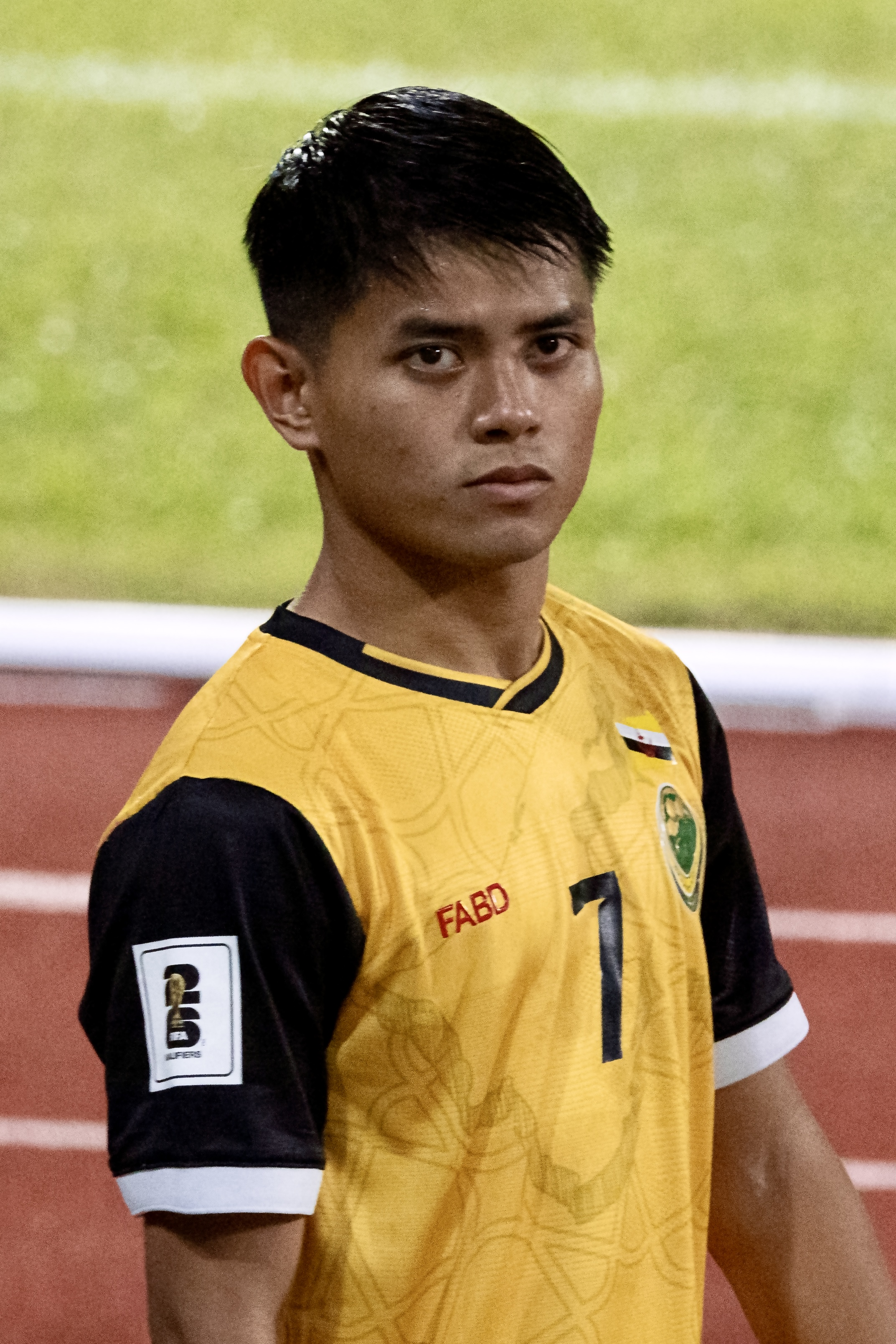
- Alinur with Brunei in 2023

Personal information
- Full name: Mohammad Alinur Rashimy bin Awang Haji Jufri
- Date of birth: 12 June 2000 (age 26)
- Place of birth: Brunei
- Positions: Full-back; midfielder

Team information
- Current team: Kasuka
- Number: 19

Youth career
- 2016: BESA
- 2017: Tabuan Muda

Senior career*
Years	Team	Apps	(Gls)
2017	Tabuan Muda 'A'		(0)
2018–	Kasuka		(18)

International career^{‡}
2017–2018	Brunei U19	3	(0)
2022	Brunei U23	3	(0)
2022–	Brunei	18	(0)
- * Club domestic league appearances and goals as of 21 April 2026 ‡ National team caps and goals as of 1 October 2026

Mohammad Alinur Rashimy bin Awang Haji Jufri (born 12 June 2000) is a Bruneian professional footballer who plays as a full-back or midfielder for Brunei Super League club Kasuka and the Brunei national team.

== Club career ==
In 2017, Alinur was a participant of the Tabuan Muda scheme organised by the National Football Association of Brunei Darussalam, which played league football in the 2017–18 Brunei Super League as Tabuan Muda 'A'. In the next season, he signed for Kasuka FC along with Hanif Aiman Adanan, Hanif Farhan Azman and Adi Syukri Salleh. He scored four goals in that season, helping Kasuka finish second in the league table.

On 7 August 2022, Alinur opened the scoring in a 13–0 drubbing of Lun Bawang FC in the first fixture of the 2022 Brunei FA Cup for Kasuka. They eventually went all the way to the final of the competition where they were beaten by DPMM FC by two goals to one.

In what was the opening match for the 2023 Brunei Super League, Alinur scored a late brace against MS PPDB on 3 March with the final score being 4–0. His team subsequently won the championship after dominating the league with victories in all 16 games.

As champions going into the 2024–25 Brunei Super League, Alinur performed consistently and managed to defend the title with his team in the last fixture of the league, a 2–3 win against DPMM II.

Kasuka were gunning for a third straight BSL title and were on course to claiming it in the last fixture of the season, a title decider against Indera SC who trailed them by two points. After conceding twice in the first half, Alinur was brought on at half time and managed to score for Kasuka against the run of play but the team could not find their equalising goal at the end, surrendering the title to their rivals with a 3–2 loss.

== International career ==
=== Youth ===
Alinur's first tournament with the Young Wasps was the 2017 AFF U-18 Youth Championship in September 2017 held in Myanmar where he only made a solitary appearance in a 1–8 drubbing against Vietnam. A year later, he suited up for Indonesia to take part in the 2018 AFF U-19 Youth Championship in July. Alinur played in two out of four games, both of them substitute appearances in defeats against Timor-Leste and Malaysia.

In 2022, Alinur was selected for the Brunei Under-23 squad for the February 2022 AFF U-23 Youth Championship matches held in Cambodia. Facing the home team in the first fixture, Alinur held the left side of the midfield but the Young Wasps succumbed to a 6–0 defeat. Three days later in the match against Timor-Leste, Brunei made a promising start with a goal by Hakeme Yazid Said but two deflections and an own goal condemned the boys in yellow to a 1–3 loss. Alinur kept his place in the final match against the Philippines but once again Brunei fell to a 2–1 defeat.

=== Senior ===
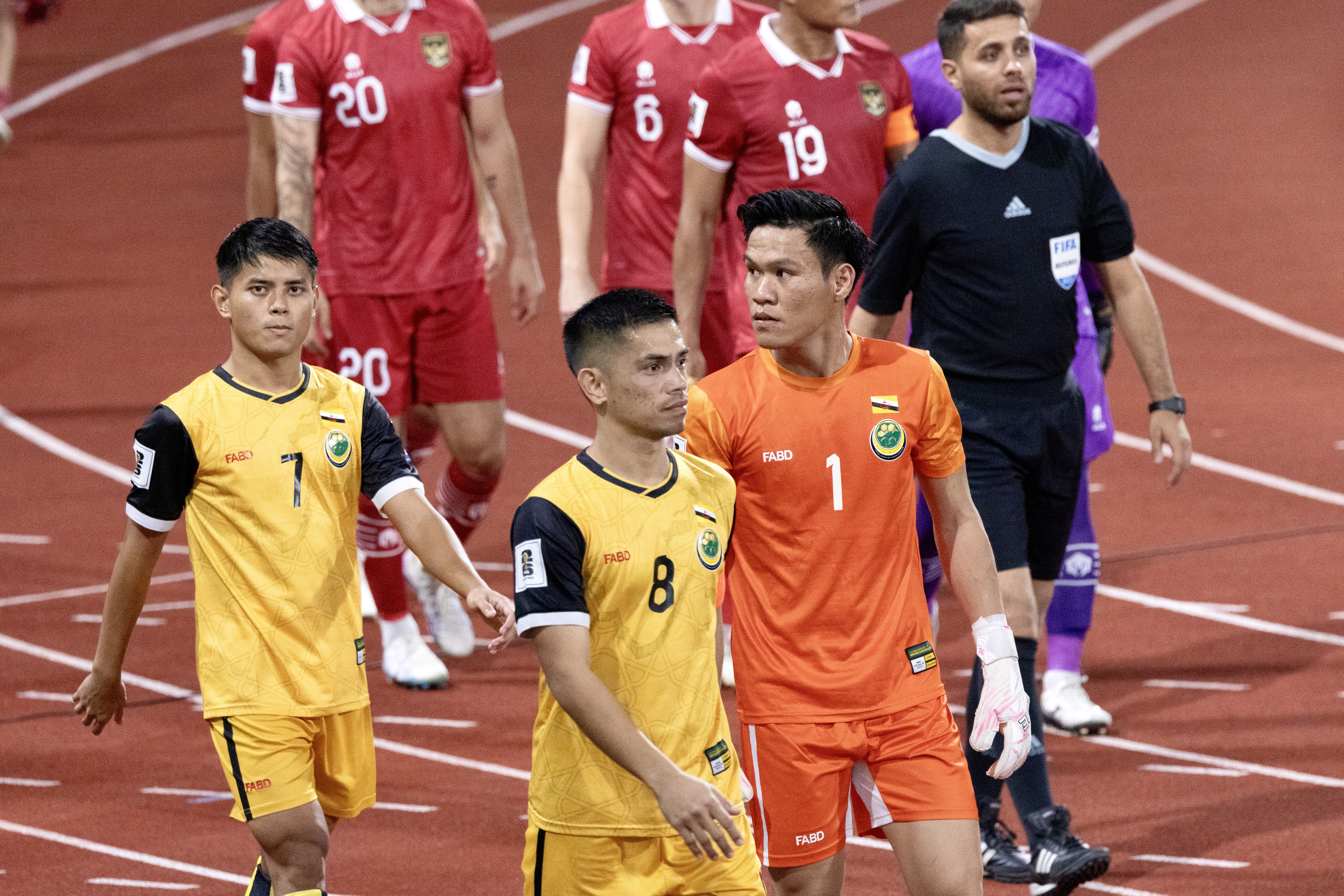
Alinur playing against Indonesia during the 2026 FIFA World Cup qualification

Alinur's performances in the Under-23s were noticed by then head coach of the full national team Rosanan Samak, who named Alinur in his first squad for the friendly match away against Laos at the end of March 2022. He made his international debut and played 90 minutes in a 3–2 defeat in said friendly, played on 27 March. Two months later, Alinur was kept in the national team for the friendly match against Malaysia at Bukit Jalil Stadium in Kuala Lumpur at the end of May. He was a first-half substitute for Abdul Hariz Herman in the match which ended 4–0 to the hosts.

In early November 2022, Alinur played both games for the national team at the 2022 AFF Mitsubishi Electric Cup qualifying against Timor-Leste in Bandar Seri Begawan. Featuring at right-back, he helped Brunei qualify for the tournament proper with a 6–3 aggregate win for the Wasps. Alinur played two games out of four at the tournament when against Indonesia on 26 December in a 0–7 loss he was dismissed in the first half for two bookable offences, prematurely ending his involvement.

Alinur played as a second-half substitute in a 10–0 shock away defeat against Hong Kong on 11 September 2023. A month later, he was selected for the 2026 World Cup qualification matches against Indonesia, where he featured from the start in the second leg at right midfield. The team succumbed to a 0–6 loss at Hassanal Bolkiah National Stadium and suffered elimination from the 2026 World Cup.

In November 2024, Alinur was selected for an away friendly against Russia in Krasnodar, and played as a substitute in a 11–0 loss. He also came on in the second half in the 5–0 defeat against Lebanon at the 2027 AFC Asian Cup qualification held in Qatar in March 2025.

In June 2025, Alinur was given starting berths at left midfield in an away friendly against Sri Lanka on 5 June and also the 2027 AFC Asian Cup qualification match against Bhutan on home soil. The Wasps were defeated 1–0 in the friendly, but came out victorious five days later in the match at Hassanal Bolkiah National Stadium with a 2–1 final score. He featured from the start against Yemen for the Asian Cup qualifying fixture held in Bandar Seri Begawan on 9 October the same year in a 0–2 loss. In March 2026, he came on as a substitute in the match against Bhutan in the final fixture of the Asian Cup qualification, but could not prevent a 2–1 defeat for the Wasps.

Alinur became the starting left back for Ali Mustafa when Brunei faced Timor-Leste for the 2026 ASEAN Championship qualification in June 2026. The tie was won by Timor-Leste by six goals to one on aggregate. The following September, Alinur started two games at the 2026 FIFA ASEAN Cup, playing in the left side of defense in defeats against Laos and Hong Kong.

== Honours ==
Kasuka FC

- Brunei Super League (2): 2023, 2024–25
