= Haziq Kasyful =

Bruneian footballer (born 1998)

- Haziq with Brunei in 2023

Personal information
- Full name: Muhammad Haziq Kasyful Azim bin Mohammad Hasimulabdillah
- Date of birth: 24 December 1998 (age 27)
- Place of birth: Brunei
- Height: 1.65 m (5 ft 5 in)
- Position: Midfielder

Team information
- Current team: Kasuka FC
- Number: 14

Youth career
- 2013–2016: Tabuan Muda
- 2019: DPMM

Senior career*
| Years | Team | Apps | (Gls) |
| 2015 | Tabuan U18 | | (0) |
| 2016 | Tabuan U21 | | (0) |
| 2017–2018 | Menglait | | (0) |
| 2018 | Kasuka | | (0) |
| 2019–2020 | DPMM II | | (1) |
| 2021– | Kasuka | 31 | (4) |

International career^{‡}
| 2013 | Brunei U15 | | (0) |
| 2015 | Brunei U19 | 4 | (0) |
| 2017–2019 | Brunei U23 | 13 | (0) |
| 2018 | Brunei U21 | 3 | (0) |
| 2022– | Brunei | 19 | (0) |
- * Club domestic league appearances and goals as of 8 November 2026 ‡ National team caps and goals as of 16 November 2026

Muhammad Haziq Kasyful Azim bin Mohammad Hasimulabdillah (born 24 December 1998) is a Bruneian footballer who plays as a midfielder for Brunei Super League club Kasuka and the Brunei national team.

== Club career ==
From 2013 to 2016, Haziq trained with Tabuan Muda, the youth scheme of the National Football Association of Brunei Darussalam, while playing for their league teams in the 2015 Brunei Premier League and the 2016 Brunei Super League consecutively. He moved to Menglait FC in the 2017–18 Brunei Super League season, finishing in tenth place out of 11, ending in relegation. He played for Kasuka FC at the start of the following season.

At the start of 2019, Haziq was one of 24 youth players unveiled as the squad members for the return of DPMM FC to the Bruneian leagues, starting from the 2019 Brunei Premier League. He scored on his debut in a 4–0 win over Rimba Star FC on 9 January. The team comfortably won the league and gained promotion to the 2020 Brunei Super League which was eventually expanded to 16 teams. Unfortunately, the league was abandoned after only two rounds played due to the COVID-19 pandemic.

The following year, DPMM FC played their first team for the 2021 Brunei Super League and hence Haziq returned to Kasuka FC, where they were unbeaten after five matches until a 2–0 defeat to Haziq's former employers DPMM ended their streak in the beginning of August. Soon after another streak was broken with the presence of local COVID-19 infections, forcing the league to be abandoned for a second time.

In 2022, Haziq managed to go all the way to the final of the 2022 Brunei FA Cup with Kasuka where they were beaten 2–1 by DPMM FC. The next year, Haziq played a part in their 16-game unbeaten streak to win the league championship. En route to their second league title in a row, Haziq scored his first goal for Kasuka in a 19–0 dismantling of Panchor Murai FC.

== International career ==
=== Youth ===
Haziq was selected for the Brunei under-19s for the 2015 AFF U-19 Youth Championship in August 2015. He was involved in all four fixtures but the team finished without a single point in their group.

Two years later, Haziq was in the Brunei under-23 squad for both the 2018 AFC U-23 Championship qualification matches in July 2017 and the 29th SEA Games the following month. He was ever-present for all 3 of the AFC qualifying tournament that was held in Myanmar where Brunei failed to advance. At the SEA Games, Haziq played in three out of four matches, sitting out the final fixture against Singapore. The Young Wasps ended the campaign without a single point gained.

Haziq was selected for the Brunei under-21 team that hosted the 2018 Hassanal Bolkiah Trophy in April under Spanish coach Mario Rivera. Despite winning 1–0 against Thailand, the team were knocked out in the group stage due to defeats to eventual winners Timor-Leste as well as Myanmar.

Haziq returned to the Under-23s for the 2020 AFC U-23 Championship qualification matches held in Vietnam in March 2019, then the 30th SEA Games in the Philippines from November to December 2019. Likewise of his involvement two years before, he played in all of the AFC qualifying games and also the SEA Games matches bar one. Unfortunately the Bruneian team also showed similar results to the ones they had two years ago too.

=== Senior ===
Haziq was called up by new national head coach Rivera for the full national team for a tri-nation tournament held in Bandar Seri Begawan in September 2022. He made his international debut as a starter against the Maldives in a 0–3 defeat on 21 September. Six days later, he came on as a substitute for Abdul Azizi Ali Rahman in a 1–0 win over Laos at the Track & Field Sports Complex. The following month, he came on for Abdul Azizi in the second half of a 6–2 victory against Timor-Leste in the first leg of the 2022 AFF Mitsubishi Electric Cup qualifying at home. He started the second match in a 1–0 loss but Brunei advanced to the group stages of the Cup 6–3 on aggregate. Haziq subsequently played in all four of the games including starts against Thailand and Cambodia, unfortunately Brunei failed to gain a single point in the whole tournament.

On 11 September 2023, Haziq played the latter 45 minutes of a 10–0 away loss to Hong Kong in a friendly. The following month, he was selected for the 2026 World Cup qualification matches against Indonesia and played the full 180 minutes in a 0–12 aggregate loss for the Wasps, failing to qualify for the second round of qualification.

In March 2024, Haziq joined the Wasps for the inaugural FIFA Series held in Saudi Arabia, making two appearances. Later that September, Haziq was selected by Brunei's interim head coach Jamie McAllister for the two-legged play-off round of the 2027 Asian Cup qualification against Macau. He was a substitute in the second leg away at Taipa where Brunei gained a 0–1 victory and hence advanced to the third round of the 2027 Asian Cup qualification 4–0 on aggregate. Later that November, he was also brought on late in the game by Vinícius Eutrópio in a 11–0 away defeat against Russia in an international friendly.

In June 2026, Haziq was selected for the national team at the 2026 Hyundai Cup qualifying against Timor-Leste and started the first leg at right-back where after the half-hour mark, he was dismissed for an off-the-ball incident with Zenivio in a 0–3 defeat. Three months later, Haziq featured for the Wasps at the 2026 FIFA ASEAN Cup, playing twice.

== Personal life ==
Haziq has a younger brother named Wafiq Danish who plays for the same club and is a Brunei international.

Haziq is also an accomplished kart racer at national level.

== Honours ==
DPMM FC

- Brunei Premier League: 2019

Kasuka FC

- Brunei Super League (2): 2023, 2024–25
