= Hanif Aiman Adanan =

Bruneian footballer (born 2000)

Hanif Aiman
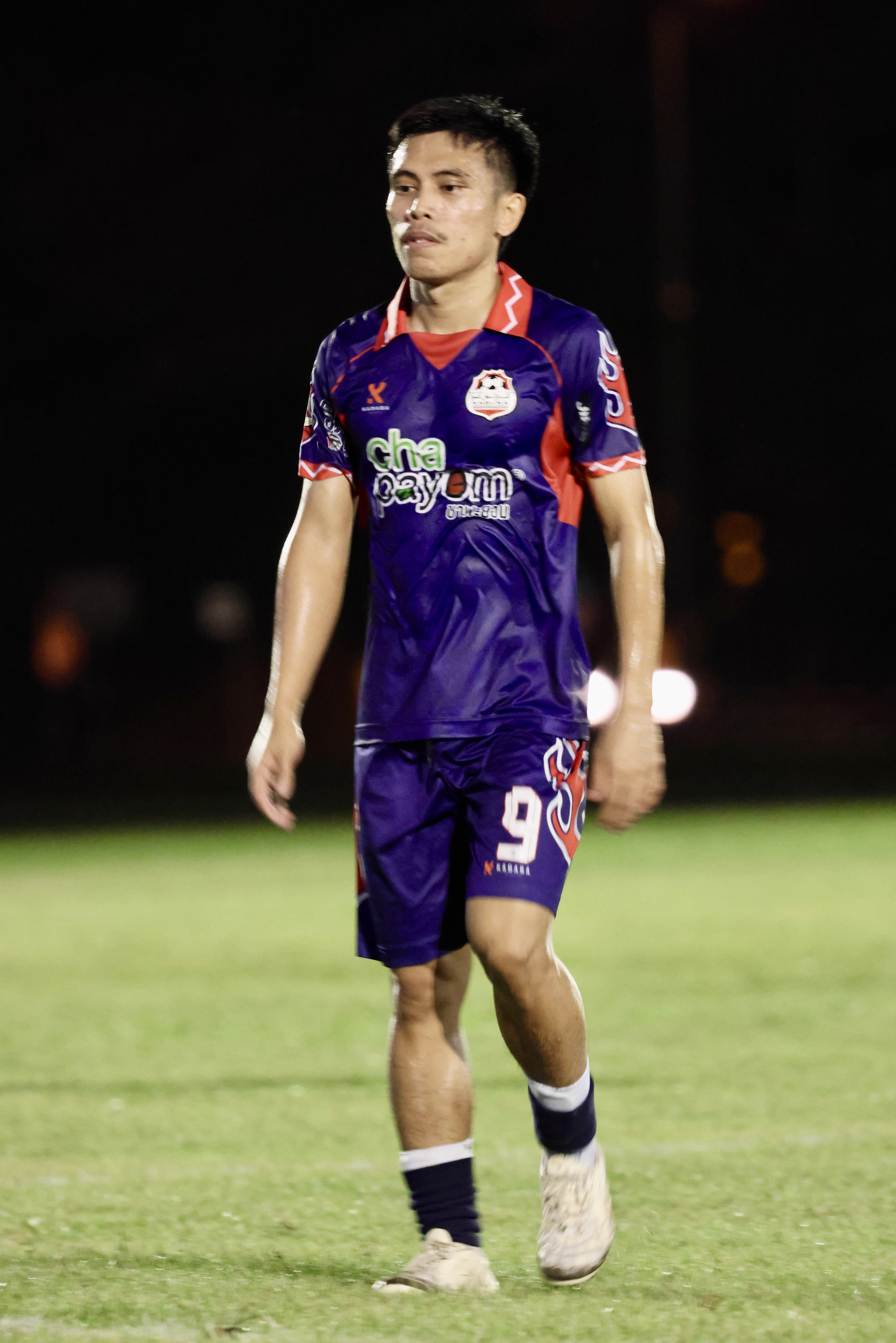

Personal information
- Full name: Mohammad Hanif Aiman bin Haji Adanan
- Date of birth: 4 March 2000 (age 26)
- Place of birth: Brunei
- Position: Forward

Team information
- Current team: Kasuka FC
- Number: 9

Youth career
- 2013–2018: Tabuan Muda

Senior career*
Years	Team	Apps	(Gls)
2017	Tabuan Muda 'A'		(2)
2018–	Kasuka		(22)

International career^{‡}
2013	Brunei U14	5	(0)
2015–2016	Brunei U16	9	(2)
2015–2018	Brunei U19	7	(1)
2018	Brunei U21	1	(0)
2019–2022	Brunei U23	5	(0)
2020–	Brunei	2	(0)
- * Club domestic league appearances and goals as of 4 November 2026 ‡ National team caps and goals as of 1 October 2026

Mohammad Hanif Aiman bin Haji Adanan (born 4 March 2000) is a Bruneian footballer who plays for Kasuka FC of the Brunei Super League as a forward.

== Club career ==
=== Tabuan Muda ===
From 2013 to 2018, Hanif was a youth prospect under the national Tabuan Muda scheme, and started playing league football in the 2017 Brunei Super League with Tabuan Muda 'A'. He scored his only goal of the season against Najip I-Team on 15 November in a 2–0 victory.

=== Kasuka ===
At the start of the 2018–19 Brunei Super League, Hanif was signed by Kasuka FC along with Young Wasps compatriots Adi Shukry Salleh, Hanif Farhan Azman and Alinur Rashimy Jufri. The striker had a memorable debut, scoring four times against Setia Perdana in a 11–0 rout. Kasuka were title challengers to the defending champions MS ABDB all season but with Hanif struggling to find goals in the first three months of 2019, a 1–2 loss to the Armymen on 3 March buried their title hopes as ABDB captured their fourth Super League championship in a row. Hanif then scored seven goals in Kasuka's last two fixtures to propel him to the top of the goalscoring charts, and with Abdul Azizi Ali Rahman failing to find the net in their final game against Kota Ranger, Hanif became the league's top scorer with 16 goals.

After two cancelled seasons of the Super League due to the COVID-19 pandemic, Hanif found himself down the pecking order at the 2022 Brunei FA Cup campaign after Kasuka signed Adi Said from Kota Ranger and paired him with Liberian striker Leon Sullivan Taylor. He only scored one goal against Rimba Star while both Adi and Taylor enjoyed 45 goals between themselves. In the cup final on 4 December where Kasuka were beaten 2–1 by DPMM FC's first team, Hanif was not selected for the matchday squad.

Hanif missed the entirety of the 2023 season with a long-term injury, but recovered by the time the following season was underway. He scored the final goal in Kasuka's first league fixture which was a 9–0 trashing of Lun Bawang FC on 1 September 2024. He managed a total of five goals for the season, including a brace against Rimba Star FC on 17 January 2025 as Kasuka defended their championship on the final day, a 2–3 victory over DPMM II.

== International career ==
=== Youth ===
Hanif featured for the Young Wasps from Under-14 level all the way to Under-23 level. His first impactful match was in a 2–2 draw with Timor-Leste at the 2015 AFF U-16 Youth Championship held in Cambodia where he scored both goals for Brunei. He also featured for the U16s for the same tournament the following year but could not find the back of the net in four games.

Hanif was with the under-19s for the 2018 AFC U-19 Championship qualification matches held in Paju, South Korea in November 2017, and took the field in the 0–11 mauling of the Young Wasps by the hosts. In their final fixture of the tournament, Hanif managed to find the net in a 2–2 draw against Timor-Leste. That following July, Hanif travelled to Surabaya for the 2018 AFF U-19 Youth Championship but had to endure four defeats.

Hanif was selected for Brunei U21 at the 2018 Hassanal Bolkiah Trophy, and was a surprise selection at the right wing position in the first match against Timor-Leste on 23 April, the tournament curtain-raiser. The hosts fell to a solitary José Oliveira penalty in the first half. Hanif subsequently failed to appear in the rest of the matches where Brunei could not progress from the group stage.

Hanif was a participant of the 30th SEA Games in December 2019 held in the Philippines. He only made two starts without lasting the first half as he was substituted for Haimie Anak Nyaring after Ishyra Asmin Jabidi's dismissal on 13 minutes for the 3–0 defeat by Laos, then was withdrawn for Hakeme Yazid Said just before half-time in a tactical switch in the 8–0 loss to Indonesia.

Hanif was in the Brunei U23 squad to compete at the 2022 AFF U-23 Championship hosted by Cambodia in February. Hanif featured in all three games where Brunei failed to gain a single point against Cambodia, Timor-Leste and the Philippines.

=== Senior ===
Hanif was first called up to the full international squad at a training camp in September 2020. He was a regular squad member without making a senior appearance before his 2023 injury. He finally made his international bow on 9 October 2025 as a second-half substitute against Yemen at the 2027 AFC Asian Cup qualification, where the Wasps went down 0–2 at Hassanal Bolkiah National Stadium.

A year later, Hanif was called up for the 2026 FIFA ASEAN Cup alongside his brother Hadif. He made one substitute appearance against Hong Kong in a 0–2 defeat on 30 September.

== Honours ==
=== Team ===
Kasuka

- Brunei Super League: 2024–25, 2025–26 (runner-up)
- Brunei FA Cup: 2022 (runner-up)

=== Individual ===
- 2018–19 Brunei Super League Top Scorer (16 goals)

== Personal life ==
Hanif has a younger brother named Hadif Aiman who plays for MS ABDB.
