= Azim Rasid =

Bruneian footballer

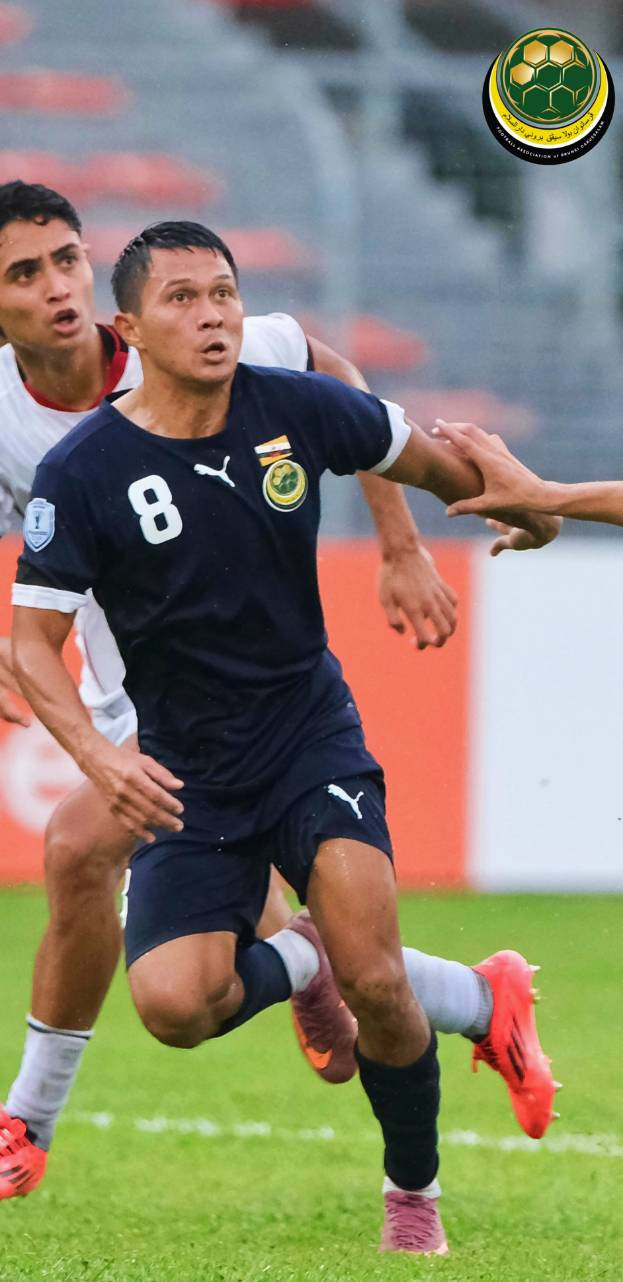

Personal information
- Full name: Abdul Azim bin Abdul Rasid
- Date of birth: 24 April 1996 (age 30)
- Place of birth: Brunei
- Position: Forward

Team information
- Current team: DPMM II
- Number: 8

Senior career*
| Years | Team | Apps | (Gls) |
| 2015–2016 | Wijaya | | (10) |
| 2017–2019 | MS PDB | | (11) |
| 2020–2021 | DPMM II | 2 | (0) |
| 2021–2026 | MS PPDB | | (24) |
| 2026– | DPMM II | 4 | (1) |

International career^{‡}
| 2013 | Brunei U19 | 3 | (0) |
| 2014 | Brunei U21 | 2 | (2) |
| 2018 | Brunei U23 | 2 | (0) |
| 2026– | Brunei | 2 | (0) |
- * Club domestic league appearances and goals as of 3 November 2026 ‡ National team caps and goals as of 23 July 2026

Abdul Azim bin Abdul Rasid (born 24 April 1996) is a Bruneian footballer who plays for Brunei Super League club DPMM FC II and the Brunei national football team as a striker.

== Club career ==
Azim began playing for Wijaya FC as a youngster in the 2015 Brunei Super League, scoring six goals in his first season. After mustering four goals in nine matches with Wijaya the following campaign, Azim opted to play for the football team of the Royal Brunei Police Force Sports Council from 2017, having entered service as an additional police officer. He led the line for the Policemen and managed to feature in two consecutive FA Cup finals, in 2018 and 2019.

Azim transferred to DPMM FC's reserve team for the 2020 Brunei Super League and played only two league games before the league was ultimately abandoned due to the COVID-19 pandemic. When football resumed in Brunei in June 2021, Azim returned to the policemen who were now called MS PPDB after the DPMM first team took over the reserve team's place. The league was halted and eventually cancelled again in August after seven rounds due to the re-emergence of COVID-19 cases inside Brunei.

In the 2022 Brunei FA Cup, Azim scored six goals to help the Policemen reach the quarter-finals, where they were beaten 3–4 on aggregate against MS ABDB. His consistent goalscoring form in recent Brunei Super League campaigns has made PPDB one of the top sides of the league, finishing in the top half of the table despite fielding no foreigners and utilising only police personnel as football players.

== International career ==
=== Youth ===
In September 2013, Azim featured alongside captain Faiq Bolkiah at the 2013 AFF U-19 Youth Championship, playing the first three group games. A year later, Azim was selected for the 2014 Hassanal Bolkiah Trophy, as part of the strikeforce of the host team alongside Adi Said and Asri Aspar. He managed two goals and two assists in two appearances, including a brace against Singapore.

In 2017, Azim was selected for the Brunei under-23s to compete at the 2018 AFC U-23 Championship qualification hosted by Myanmar in July. He took the field from off the bench in the games against the hosts as well as Singapore.

=== Senior ===
In June 2026, Azim earned a callup to the full international squad to face Timor-Leste in the two-legged qualification for the Hyundai Cup. He started both games in attack whereby the Wasps were beaten 6–1 on aggregate.
