= 2022 Brunei FA Cup =

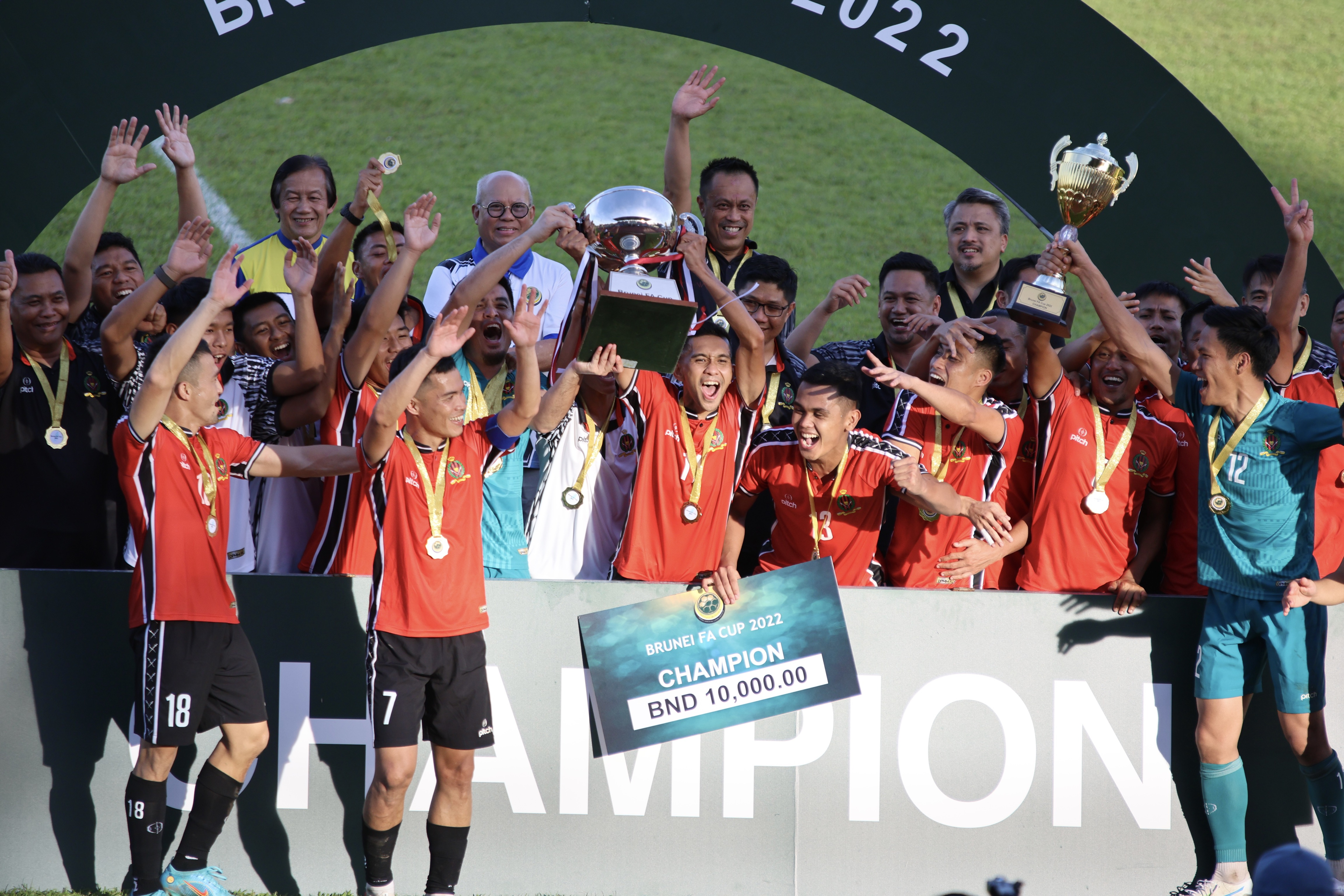
- DPMM winning the FA Cup

Tournament details
- Country: Brunei
- Dates: 6 August 2022 – 4 December 2022
- Teams: 32

Final positions
- Champions: DPMM FC (2nd title)
- Runners-up: Kasuka FC

Tournament statistics
- Matches played: 79
- Goals scored: 385 (4.87 per match)
- Top goal scorer: Leon Sullivan Taylor (25 goals)

The 2022 Brunei FA Cup was the 13th edition of the Brunei FA Cup and was the sole club competition organised by the Football Association of Brunei Darussalam for the year 2022. It began on August 6 and will be played until 4 December.

The winner of the FA Cup will become the nation's representative for the 2023–24 AFC Cup.

DPMM FC became the winners of the competition by beating Kasuka FC 2–1 in the final at Track & Field Sports Complex on 4 December. This is DPMM's second FA Cup triumph after last winning it in 2004.

== Competition format ==
32 teams were divided into groups of four, making eight groups in total. Teams will only play one round of matches, and the top two teams in the group table will advance to the knockout stage. The knockout matches will be contested in a home-and-away format up until the final match.

== List of participating teams ==
from Brunei Super League

- BAKES FC
- BSRC FC
- DPMM FC
- IKLS-MB5 FC
- Indera SC
- Jerudong FC
- Kasuka FC
- KB FC
- Kota Ranger FC
- MS ABDB
- MS PPDB
- Panchor Murai FC
- Rimba Star FC
- Setia Perdana FC
- Wijaya FC

from District Leagues

- Admirul Red Star FC
- AKSE Bersatu
- Almerez FA
- Azmainshah FC
- Bang Dalam FC
- Dagang FT
- Hawa FC
- HR FT
- Lun Bawang FC
- Miisa United FC
- MSN United FC
- Nelayan FT
- Perka United FC
- Seri Wira FC
- TDAFA U-20
- Tutong Hotspurs
- Wondrous FT

== Group stage ==
=== Group A ===
Pos	Team	Pld	W	D	L	GF	GA	GD	Pts	Qualification or relegation
1	Panchor Murai FC	3	2	1	0	3	1	+2	7	Qualification to knockout stage
2	AKSE Bersatu	3	2	0	1	7	4	+3	6	Qualification to knockout stage
3	BSRC FC	3	1	1	1	4	5	−1	4	
4	Azmainshah FC	3	0	0	3	2	6	−4	0	

Source: FABD
17 August 2022
20:15 UTC+8

BSRC	2–0	Azmainshah
Mirza Nursyakirin 32'; Herman 38'

Brunei Shell Recreational Club, Seria
6 August 2022
20:15 UTC+8

Panchor Murai	1–0	AKSE
Sallehudin 19'

Berakas Sports Complex, Berakas

20 August 2022
20:15 UTC+8

AKSE	4–1	BSRC
Nur Hidayat 15', 45'; Zainul Ariffin 34', 86'		Wardi 43'

Berakas Sports Complex, Berakas
21 August 2022
16:00 UTC+8

Azmainshah	0–1	Panchor Murai
		Samsul 10'

Tutong Sports Complex, Tutong

3 September 2022
20:15 UTC+8

BSRC	1–1	Panchor Murai
Wardi 19'		Radzillah 10'

Brunei Shell Recreational Club, Seria
3 September 2022
20:15 UTC+8

AKSE	3–2	Azmainshah
Nur Hidayat 28', 74'; Zainul Ariffin 39'		Iqmal Syukaimee 49', 56'

Berakas Sports Complex, Berakas

=== Group B ===
Pos	Team	Pld	W	D	L	GF	GA	GD	Pts	Qualification or relegation
1	MS ABDB	3	3	0	0	10	0	+10	9	Qualification to knockout stage
2	Hawa FC	3	1	1	1	2	1	+1	4	Qualification to knockout stage
3	BAKES FC	3	1	1	1	2	7	−5	4	
4	HR FT	3	0	0	3	1	7	−6	0	

Source: FABD
7 August 2022
16:00 UTC+8

ABDB	1 – 0	Hawa
Radin 14'

Bolkiah Garrison Mini Stadium, Berakas
7 August 2022
16:00 UTC+8

BAKES	2 – 1	HR FT
Raziman 41'; Razi 75'		Abdul Hadiyusri 13'

Tutong Sports Complex, Tutong

21 August 2022
16:00 UTC+8

HR	0 – 3	ABDB
		Shafie 7'; Alimuddin 23'; Abdul Fairdaus 62'

Track & Field Sports Complex, Berakas
21 August 2022
16:00 UTC+8

Hawa	0 – 0	BAKES

Arena Field, Seria

4 September 2022
16:00 UTC+8

ABDB	6 – 0	BAKES
Abdul Hariz 16', 35'; Saiful Ammar 33', 46'; Rahimin 45'; Kamarul Ariffin 81' (o.g.)

Bolkiah Garrison Mini Stadium, Berakas
4 September 2022
16:00 UTC+8

HR	0 – 2	Hawa
		Safuan 41'; Abdul Halim 67'

Arena Field, Seria

=== Group C ===
Pos	Team	Pld	W	D	L	GF	GA	GD	Pts	Qualification or relegation
1	Kota Ranger FC	3	3	0	0	10	0	+10	9	Qualification to knockout stage
2	Almerez FA	3	1	1	1	2	4	−2	4	Qualification to knockout stage
3	Wijaya FC	3	0	2	1	2	4	−2	2	
4	Bang Dalam FC	3	0	1	2	1	7	−6	1	

Source: FABD
7 August 2022
16:00 UTC+8

Kota Ranger	3 – 0	Almerez
Fathurrahman 7'; Hazmi 19'; Salleh 23'

FABD Artificial Field, Berakas
7 August 2022
16:00 UTC+8

Wijaya	1 – 1	Bang Dalam
Jamrin 45'		Ari Saizulfadhli 57'

Track & Field Sports Complex, Berakas

21 August 2022
16:00 UTC+8

Bang Dalam	0 – 5	Kota Ranger
		Hazmi 22'; Sahfiq Hidayat 36', 44'; Abiodun 50'; Faiz Farhan 88'

Berakas Sports Complex, Berakas
21 August 2022
20:15 UTC+8

Almerez	1 – 1	Wijaya
Abdul Hafiy 24'		Jamrin 68'

Berakas Sports Complex, Berakas

4 September 2022
16:00 UTC+8

Kota Ranger	2 – 0	Wijaya
Esmendy 54'; Fathurrahman 89'

Berakas Sports Complex, Berakas
4 September 2022
16:00 UTC+8

Bang Dalam	0 – 1	Almerez
		Darwish Aiman 90+3'

Tutong Sports Complex, Tutong

=== Group D ===
Pos	Team	Pld	W	D	L	GF	GA	GD	Pts	Qualification or relegation
1	Kasuka FC	3	3	0	0	31	0	+31	9	Qualification to knockout stage
2	Rimba Star FC	3	2	0	1	5	8	−3	6	Qualification to knockout stage
3	Dagang FT	3	1	0	2	7	20	−13	3	
4	Lun Bawang FC	3	0	0	3	4	19	−15	0	

Source: FABD
7 August 2022
16:00 UTC+8

Rimba Star	4 – 2	Dagang
Danial Fadzillah 8'; Khalil 29'; Shah Rizan 37'; Haziq 80'		Amni 1'; Hazim 54'

FABD Artificial Field, Berakas
7 August 2022
20:15 UTC+8

Kasuka	13 – 0	Lun Bawang
Alinur Rashimy 1'; Taylor 9', 18', 29', 70', 72'; Haziq Kasyful Azim 15'; Adi 33', 55'; Abbey 61', 89'; Asri 87'; Aman 90'

Berakas Sports Complex, Berakas

21 August 2022
16:00 UTC+8

Lun Bawang	0 – 1	Rimba Star
		Khalil 86'

Batu Apoi Sports Complex, Batu Apoi
21 August 2022
16:00 UTC+8

Dagang	0 – 12	Kasuka
		Taylor 7', 14', 21', 45+2', 69', 73'; Adi 23', 27', 43', 51'; Maududi 47'; Haziq Kasyful Azim 76'

Hassanal Bolkiah Mini Stadium (Police HQ), Gadong

4 September 2022
16:00 UTC+8

Dagang	5 – 4	Lun Bawang
Sayzwan 10', 45'; Syafiq 44'; Fadhilah 54'; Asri 60'		Enikati 15', 17'; Abdul Halim 47'; Zulfadhli 65'

Track & Field Sports Complex, Berakas
11 September 2022
16:00 UTC+8

Kasuka	6 – 0	Rimba Star
Taylor 20', 36'; Adi 33', 76'; Maududi 53'; Hanif Aiman 83'

FABD Artificial Field, Berakas

=== Group E ===
Pos	Team	Pld	W	D	L	GF	GA	GD	Pts	Qualification or relegation
1	DPMM FC	3	3	0	0	29	0	+29	9	Qualification to knockout stage
2	IKLS-MB5 FC	3	2	0	1	9	5	+4	6	Qualification to knockout stage
3	Nelayan FT	3	1	0	2	4	13	−9	3	
4	Seri Wira FC	3	0	0	3	3	27	−24	0	

Source: FABD
13 August 2022
20:15 UTC+8

DPMM	18 – 0	Seri Wira
Razimie 6'; Hakeme 8' (pen.), 20', 25', 32', 38'; Najib 24'; Nurikhwan 35'; Fakharrazi 41'; Azwan A. 43'; Shah Razen 47', 62', 78'; Abdul Azizi 59', 84'; Abdul Mu'iz 85'; Wafi 88'; Danisyh Syariee 90'

Jerudong Park Mini Stadium, Jerudong
13 August 2022
20:15 UTC+8

IKLS-MB5	3 – 1	Nelayan
Haziq 39'; Nor Hidayatullah 52'; Kurmin 80'		Shahfri 85'

Berakas Sports Complex, Berakas

28 August 2022
16:00 UTC+8

Seri Wira	1 – 6	IKLS-MB5
Hanisam 11'		Nurizzuddin 1', 15'; Nor Hidayatullah 13', 45+1', 52'; Adam Khairuddin 90+2'

Tutong Sports Complex, Tutong
28 August 2022
20:15 UTC+8

Nelayan	0 – 8	DPMM
		Azwan A. 12'; Shah Razen 24' (pen.), 41', 64'; Azwan S. 35', 45', 59'; Nurikhwan 90'

Jerudong Park Mini Stadium, Jerudong

10 September 2022
20:15 UTC+8

DPMM	3 – 0	IKLS-MB5
Hanif H. 2'; Razimie 12'; Shah Razen 56'

Jerudong Park Mini Stadium, Jerudong
11 September 2022
16:00 UTC+8

Nelayan	3 – 2	Seri Wira
Helmizulhisyam 40'; Iqmal Halim 79', 87'		Zulkarnain 47'; Norhafiz 90'

Track & Field Sports Complex, Berakas

=== Group F ===
Pos	Team	Pld	W	D	L	GF	GA	GD	Pts	Qualification or relegation
1	Indera SC	3	3	0	0	20	0	+20	9	Qualification to knockout stage
2	Jerudong FC	3	2	0	1	13	7	+6	6	Qualification to knockout stage
3	Wondrous FT	3	1	0	2	10	14	−4	3	
4	Perka United FC	3	0	0	3	4	26	−22	0	

Source: FABD
14 August 2022
16:00 UTC+8

Indera	6 – 0	Wondrous
Hamizan Aziz 4', 15'; Azim 7'; Aimmil Rahman 70'; Zulkhairy 75'; B. Lim 90+2'

Tutong Sports Complex, Tutong
14 August 2022
16:00 UTC+8

Jerudong	7 – 2	Perka Utd
Yansen 12'; Mudzaffar 24'; Hairun Ikhwan 48', 57'; Izzat Haziq 79', 90', 90+4'		Abdul Qayyum 47', 65'

Berakas Sports Complex, Berakas

27 August 2022
20:15 UTC+8

Wondrous	2 – 6	Jerudong
Nazriuddin 43'; Rudy Afrie 56'		Izzat Haziq 7', 78', 87'; Mudzaffar 59', 75'; Hairun Ikhwan 69'

Berakas Sports Complex, Berakas
28 August 2022
16:00 UTC+8

Perka Utd	0 – 11	Indera
		B. Lim 11', 42', 71', 84', 88'; Henry 23'; Amiruddin 39'; Fakhri 56'; Amin 59'; Aimmil Rahman 90+1'; Azim 90+2'

Track & Field Sports Complex, Berakas

11 September 2022
16:00 UTC+8

Perka Utd	2 – 8	Wondrous
Hasnizam Saifullah 6'; Norhamizan 59'		Abdul Hadi 12'; Nazriuddin 17'; Mu'izzuddin 20'; Ahmad Salihin 30'; Rudy Afrie 52'; Wafiuddin 66'; Safiee 71', 74'

Batu Apoi Sports Complex, Batu Apoi
25 September 2022
16:00 UTC+8

Indera	3 – 0	Jerudong
Henry 35'; B. Lim 45+4', 48'

Berakas Sports Complex, Berakas

=== Group G ===
Pos	Team	Pld	W	D	L	GF	GA	GD	Pts	Qualification or relegation
1	MS PPDB	3	2	1	0	13	2	+11	7	Qualification to knockout stage
2	Setia Perdana FC	3	1	2	0	8	3	+5	5	Qualification to knockout stage
3	Miisa United FC	3	1	1	1	9	6	+3	4	
4	MSN United FC	3	0	0	3	1	20	−19	0	

Source: FABD
14 August 2022
16:00 UTC+8

PPDB	9 – 0	MSN Utd
Fakhrol Tamimi 30', 86'; Na'im 42', 45'; Nazirrudin 47', 49'; Abdul Azim 51', 90+3'; Asri 90'

Hassanal Bolkiah Mini Stadium (Police HQ), Gadong
14 August 2022
16:00 UTC+8

Setia Perdana	2 – 2	Miisa Utd
Khairul 60'; Amiruddin 86'		Azmi 15', 83'

Track & Field Sports Complex, Berakas

18 September 2022
16:00 UTC+8

Miisa Utd	1 – 3	PPDB
Azamain 69'		Na'im 31'; Norfaez 52'; Abdul Azim 56'

Berakas Sports Complex, Berakas
18 September 2022
16:00 UTC+8

MSN Utd	0 – 5	Setia Perdana
		Khairul 11'; Abdul Qawi 18'; Fathlinnur Adhlin 32'; Alif 60'; Saiful Rizal 86'

FABD Artificial Field, Berakas

11 September 2022
16:00 UTC+8

Miisa Utd	6 – 1	MSN Utd
Faizal 1', 11', 22', 44'; Rohzaimi 16', 35'		Daud 28'

Berakas Sports Complex, Berakas
30 September 2022
16:00 UTC+8

PPDB	1 – 1	Setia Perdana
Fazizzul 38'		Khairul 77'

FABD Artificial Field, Berakas

=== Group H ===
Pos	Team	Pld	W	D	L	GF	GA	GD	Pts	Qualification or relegation
1	Kuala Belait FC	3	2	1	0	14	1	+13	7	Qualification to knockout stage
2	Tutong Hotspurs	3	2	1	0	6	1	+5	7	Qualification to knockout stage
3	Admirul Red Star FC	3	1	0	2	2	9	−7	3	
4	Tutong U-20	3	0	0	3	0	11	−11	0	

Source: FABD
14 August 2022
16:00 UTC+8

KB	1 – 1	Tutong Hotspurs
Jazimin 52'		Fakhri 6'

Arena Field, Seria
14 August 2022
20:15 UTC+8

Admirul Red Star	2 – 0	Tutong U-20
Aaiman Muqmin 42', 73'

Berakas Sports Complex, Berakas

11 September 2022
16:00 UTC+8

KB	7 – 0	Admirul Red Star
Hazreen 42', 47', 65'; Azizul Syafiee 45+1' (pen.); Haikal 61'; Nazri 73' (o.g.); Nur Hazwan Khan 77'

Arena Field, Seria
11 September 2022
16:00 UTC+8

Tutong U-20	0 – 3	Tutong Hotspurs
		Hairol Azaman Shah 45', 77'; Reniel 67'

Tutong Sports Complex, Tutong

28 August 2022
16:00 UTC+8

Tutong Hotspurs	2 – 0	Admirul Red Star
Reniel 67'; Azril 73'

Berakas Sports Complex, Berakas
18 September 2022
16:00 UTC+8

Tutong U-20	0 – 6	KB
		Hazreen 20'; Azizul Syafiee 47', 73'; Jazimin 54'; Amirul Zafrey 57'; Haikal 90+2'

Track & Field Sports Complex, Berakas

== Knockout stage ==
=== Round of 16 ===
Matches to be played on 1-2 October and 15-16 October.

Team 1	Agg.	Team 2	1st leg	2nd leg
Panchor Murai FC	5–2	Hawa FC	3–1	2–1
MS ABDB	4–1	AKSE Bersatu	1–0	3–1
Kota Ranger FC	9–1	Rimba Star FC	8–1	1–0
Kasuka FC	28–0	Almerez FA	9–0	19–0
DPMM FC	23–0	Jerudong FC	15–0	8–0
Indera SC	9–3	IKLS-MB5 FC	2–1	7–2
MS PPDB	4–0	Tutong Hotspurs	1–0	3–0
KB FC	4–0	Setia Perdana FC	1–0	3–0

==== First leg ====
1 October 2022
21:00 UTC+8

Panchor Murai	3 – 1	Hawa
Radzillah 18'; Ahmad Asyraf 83'; Amirul Izzat 90+4'		Abdul Halim 90'

Berakas Sports Complex, Berakas

1 October 2022
21:00 UTC+8

DPMM	15 – 0	Jerudong
Shah Razen 7', 45', 50', 59', 60'; Azwan A. 33'; Azwan S. 44', 79'; Hanif H. 47'; Hakeme Yazid 52', 63', 67', 68'; Abdul Azizi 78'; Najib 87'

Jerudong Park Mini Stadium, Jerudong

2 October 2022
15:30 UTC+8

ABDB	1 – 0	AKSE Bersatu
Saiful Ammar 45+1'

Bolkiah Garrison Mini Stadium, Berakas

2 October 2022
15:30 UTC+8

Kota Ranger	8 – 1	Rimba Star
Fathurrahman 9', 72'; Abiodun 22', 25', 41'; Hafis 23'; Shad Maymoun 66'; Imam Mahdi 87'		Khalil 30'

Berakas Sports Complex, Berakas

2 October 2022
15:30 UTC+8

Kasuka	9 – 0	Almerez
Alinur Rashimy 5', 86'; Adi 20', 29'; Haziq Kasyful Azim 43'; Taylor 45+1'; Sairol 69'; Naqiuddin 80' (o.g.); Iddzaham Aleshahmezan 85'

Track & Field Sports Complex, Berakas

2 October 2022
15:30 UTC+8

Indera	2 – 1	IKLS-MB5
Azim 22', 38'		Zool Hasbemi 87'

FABD Artificial Field, Berakas

9 October 2022
16:00 UTC+8

PPDB	1 – 0	Tutong Hotspurs
Fakhrol Tamimi 48'

FABD Artificial Field, Berakas

9 October 2022
16:00 UTC+8

KB	1 – 0	Setia Perdana
Amiruddin 38' (o.g.)

Arena Field, Seria

==== Second leg ====
15 October 2022
20:15 UTC+8

Rimba Star	0 – 1	Kota Ranger
	Report	Azreen Eskander 90+3'

Berakas Sports Complex, Berakas

16 October 2022
15:30 UTC+8

Hawa	1 – 2	Panchor Murai
Hisyamuddin 7'		Ahmad Asyraf 35'; Radzillah 85'

Arena Field, Seria

16 October 2022
15:30 UTC+8

AKSE Bersatu	1 – 3	ABDB
Hamdi 12'		Razali 26'; Juma'at Rusydi 82'; Hariz Danial 90'

Berakas Sports Complex, Berakas

16 October 2022
15:30 UTC+8

Almerez	0 – 19	Kasuka
		Maududi 3'; Adi 8', 18', 44', 48', 66', 69'; Nazhan 9', 33'; Mardi Mirza 16', 28'; Taylor 25', 45', 52', 59', 71', 74', 75'; Eddy Shahrol 37'

FABD Artificial Field, Berakas

16 October 2022
15:30 UTC+8

Jerudong	0 – 8	DPMM
		Shah Razen 1', 37'; Razimie 29'; Najib 39'; Abdul Azizi 46', 67', 69'; Hakeme Yazid 88'

Track & Field Sports Complex, Berakas

16 October 2022
15:30 UTC+8

IKLS-MB5	2 – 7	Indera
Haziq Naqiuddin 50'; Yumni 81'		Amirul Hamrey 2', 40'; Petrus 15'; Azim 29'; B. Lim 36'; Hamizan 44'; Ridhwan 57'

Batu Apoi Sports Complex, Batu Apoi

16 October 2022
15:30 UTC+8

Tutong Hotspurs	0 – 3	PPDB
		Abdul Wadud 27'; Abdul Azim 33', 65'

Tutong Sports Complex, Tutong

16 October 2022
20:15 UTC+8

Setia Perdana	0 – 3	KB
		Jazimin 7'; Azizul Syafiee 16', 45+1'

Berakas Sports Complex, Berakas

=== Quarter-final ===
The draw for the quarter-final allocation was held on 17 October. Matches are to be played on 22-23 October and 12-15 November.

Team 1	Agg.	Team 2	1st leg	2nd leg
DPMM FC	13–1	Indera SC	5–1	8–0
KB FC	0–3	Kota Ranger	0–2	0–1
MS PPDB	3–4	MS ABDB	1–3	2–1
Panchor Murai	0–18	Kasuka FC	0–9	0–9

==== First leg ====
22 October 2022
20:15 UTC+8

DPMM	5 – 1	Indera
Shah Razen 25', 84'; Hakeme Yazid 55', 85'; Hanif H. 79'		Aimmil Rahman 9'

Jerudong Park Mini Stadium, Jerudong

22 October 2022
20:15 UTC+8

Panchor Murai	0 – 9	Kasuka
		Haziq Kasyful Azim 2', 5'; Adi 17', 38'; Alinur Rashimy 28', 54'; Abbey 31'; Eddy Shahrol 49'; Taylor 72'

Berakas Sports Complex, Berakas

23 October 2022
16:00 UTC+8

PPDB	1 – 3	ABDB
Abdul Azim 90+2'		Hariz Danial 18'; Rahimin 21', 42'

Track & Field Sports Complex, Berakas

23 October 2022
16:00 UTC+8

KB	0 – 2	Kota Ranger
		Esmendy 45+1'; Azreen Eskander 64'

Arena Field, Seria

==== Second leg ====
13 November 2022
15:30 UTC+8

Indera	0 – 8	DPMM
		Azwan A. 15', 46'; Shah Razen 55'; M. Lim 57' (o.g.); Nurikhwan 64'; Hakeme 79', 88'; Ali Munawwar 84'

Track & Field Sports Complex, Berakas

13 November 2022
15:30 UTC+8

Kasuka	9 – 0	Panchor Murai
Abdul Halim 15', 45+2', 56'; Adi 19', 51'; Nazhan 24'; Maududi 67'; Taylor 76'; Iddzaham 90+2'

Berakas Sports Complex, Berakas

13 November 2022
15:30 UTC+8

Kota Ranger	1 – 0	KB
Hafis 12'

FABD Artificial Field, Berakas

15 November 2022
15:30 UTC+8

ABDB	1 – 2	PPDB
Muqaddim 36'		Na'im 20'; Fazizzul 90'

Track & Field Sports Complex, Berakas

=== Semi-final ===
Team 1	Agg.	Team 2	1st leg	2nd leg
DPMM FC	3–0	Kota Ranger	1–0	2–0
MS ABDB	1–3	Kasuka FC	0–2	1–1

==== First leg ====
19 November 2022
20:15 UTC+8

DPMM	1–0	Kota Ranger
Hakeme 22'

Jerudong Park Mini Stadium, Jerudong

19 November 2022
20:15 UTC+8

ABDB	0–2	Kasuka
		Maududi 8'; Taylor 75'

Berakas Sports Complex, Berakas

==== Second leg ====
26 November 2022
20:15 UTC+8

Kasuka	1 – 1	ABDB
Iddzaham 90'		Radin 65'

Berakas Sports Complex, Berakas

27 November 2022
15:30 UTC+8

Kota Ranger	0 – 2	DPMM
		Shah Razen 20'; Abdul Azizi 31'

Track & Field Sports Complex, Berakas

=== Final ===
4 December 2022
14:45 UTC+8

DPMM	2 – 1	Kasuka
Azwan A. 45+2'; Shah Razen 72'		Taylor 13'

Track & Field Sports Complex, Berakas
Referee: Abdul Hakim Haidi (Brunei)

DPMM FC
Kasuka FC

DPMM:
GK	12	Haimie Abdullah Nyaring	(yellow card) 90+2'
DF	19	Nurikhwan Othman
DF	13	Hanif Hamir
DF	15	Hazwan Hamzah
LB	3	Abdul Mu'iz Sisa	(substituted off) 29'
RB	14	Helmi Zambin
MF	7	Azwan Ali Rahman (c)	(substituted off) 90+5'
MF	8	Hendra Azam Idris
MF	22	Shah Razen Said
FW	17	Hakeme Yazid Said
FW	9	Abdul Azizi Ali Rahman	(substituted off) 55'
Substitutes:
GK	25	Wardun Yussof
DF	2	Wafi Aminuddin	(substituted on) 90+5'
DF	20	Fakharrazi Hassan
MF	6	Azwan Saleh
MF	11	Najib Tarif	(substituted on) 29'	(yellow card) 81'
MF	24	Ali Munawwar Abdul Rahman
FW	18	Razimie Ramlli	(substituted on) 55'
Coach:
(Brunei) Helme Panjang

Kasuka:
GK	18	Azman Ilham Noor
DF	3	Sairol Sahari (c)
DF	2	Afi Aminuddin	(substituted off) 61'
DF	4	Samuel Kojo Abbey
MF	21	Khairil Shahme Suhaimi
MF	11	Maududi Hilmi Kasmi	(substituted off) 78'
MF	8	Eddy Shahrol Omar	(substituted off) 68'
MF	19	Alinur Rashimy Jufri	(yellow card) 34'
MF	14	Haziq Kasyful Azim Hasimulabdillah	(substituted off) 78'
FW	10	Leon Sullivan Taylor
FW	30	Adi Said
Substitutes:
GK	22	Danish Aiman Mardianni
DF	5	Reduan Petara	(substituted on) 78'
DF	6	Maziri Maidin	(substituted on) 61'	(yellow card) 62'
DF	20	Nazhan Zulkifle	(substituted on) 78'
MF	15	Mardi Mirza Abdullah
MF	16	Khairul Anwar Abdul Rahim	(substituted on) 68'
FW	17	Idzzaham Aleshahmezan Metali
Coach:
(Brunei) Ali Mustafa

=== Bracket ===
Quarter-finals
DPMM FC	5	8	13
Indera SC	1	0	1
KB FC	0	0	0
Kota Ranger	2	1	3
MS PPDB	1	2	3
MS ABDB	3	1	4
Panchor Murai	0	0	0
Kasuka FC	9	9	18

Semi-finals
DPMM FC	1	2	3
Kota Ranger	0	0	0
MS ABDB	0	1	1
Kasuka FC	2	1	3

Final
DPMM FC	2
Kasuka FC	1

== Awards ==
Award	Name	Club
Player of the Tournament	(Brunei) Nur Ikhwan Othman	DPMM FC
Young Player of the Tournament	(Brunei) Hakeme Yazid Said	DPMM FC
Top Scorer	(Liberia) Leon Sullivan Taylor	Kasuka FC
Coach of the Tournament	(Brunei) Ali Mustafa	Kasuka FC
Fair Play Award	Kasuka FC	

== Top scorers ==
- Note: Goals for this competition do not count towards goalscoring records of the Brunei Super League, nor individual domestic league goal tallies

Pos	Player	Club	Goals
1	(Liberia) Leon Sullivan Taylor	Kasuka FC	25
2	(Brunei) Adi Said	Kasuka FC	20
3	(Brunei) Shah Razen Said	DPMM FC	19
4	(Brunei) Hakeme Yazid Said	DPMM FC	15
5	(Brunei) Brian Lim Yong Song	Indera SC	9
6	(Brunei) Abdul Azizi Ali Rahman	DPMM FC	7
7	(Brunei) Abdul Azim Abdul Rasid	MS PPDB	6
7	(Brunei) Azwan Ali Rahman	DPMM FC	6
7	(Brunei) Izzat Haziq Husli	Jerudong FC	6
9	(Brunei) Alinur Rashimy Jufri	Kasuka FC	5
9	(Brunei) Azim Hamidoon	Indera SC	5
9	(Brunei) Azizul Syafiee Tajul Ariffin	KB FC	5
9	(Brunei) Azwan Saleh	DPMM FC	5
9	(Brunei) Haziq Kasyful Azim Hasimulabdillah	Kasuka FC	5
9	(Brunei) Maududi Hilmi Kasmi	Kasuka FC	5
