= Rahimni Pundut =

Bruneian footballer

Personal information
- Full name: Haji Rahimni bin Haji Pundut
- Date of birth: 5 January 1987 (age 39)
- Place of birth: Brunei
- Height: 1.75 m (5 ft 9 in)
- Position: Striker

Senior career*
Years	Team	Apps	(Gls)
2009	DPMM	1	(0)
2011	DST Group FT		
2011–2020	Setia Perdana		
2023	Setia Perdana	3	(0)
- * Club domestic league appearances and goals as of 31 January 2025

Haji Rahimni bin Haji Pundut (born 5 January 1987) is a Bruneian former footballer who played as a striker. Due to a typing error, his patronym is often mistakenly referred to as Pundat.

== Career ==
Rahimni previously played for professional club Brunei DPMM FC in the 2009 S.League season, DPMM's first and eventful season in Singapore after withdrawing from the Malaysia Super League. He only saw one minute of playing time, against Sengkang Punggol on 6 July. He was on the bench for the final of the 2009 Singapore League Cup, picking up a winner's medal as DPMM won the game 4–3 on penalties after a 1–1 draw in extra time.

Rahimni moved to Setia Perdana in 2011 for the Brunei National Football League, a competition ran by the newly established National Football Association of Brunei Darussalam to determine the teams for a new league that was to become the 2012–13 Brunei Super League. His club finished third in the one-off league, placing them in the 2014 Brunei Premier League.

On 31 May 2015, Rahimni scored a three-minute hattrick in a 4–2 victory against Kasuka FC. Previously, Qamarul Ariffin Hifni achieved this feat for March United in a 9–3 win against IB Pandan in the 2005 B-League Premier Two. Rahimni finished the 2015 season as top scorer for the Brunei Premier League with 16 goals.

Rahimni scored a total of seven goals to lift Setia Perdana to first place in the 2017 Brunei Premier League. This brought promotion for Setia to the 2018–19 Brunei Super League.

== Honours ==
=== Team ===
DPMM FC

- Singapore League Cup: 2009

Setia Perdana

- Brunei Premier League: 2017

=== Individual ===
- 2015 Brunei Premier League top scorer - 16 goals
