= Abdul Hariz Herman =

Bruneian footballer (born 2000)

Abdul Hariz
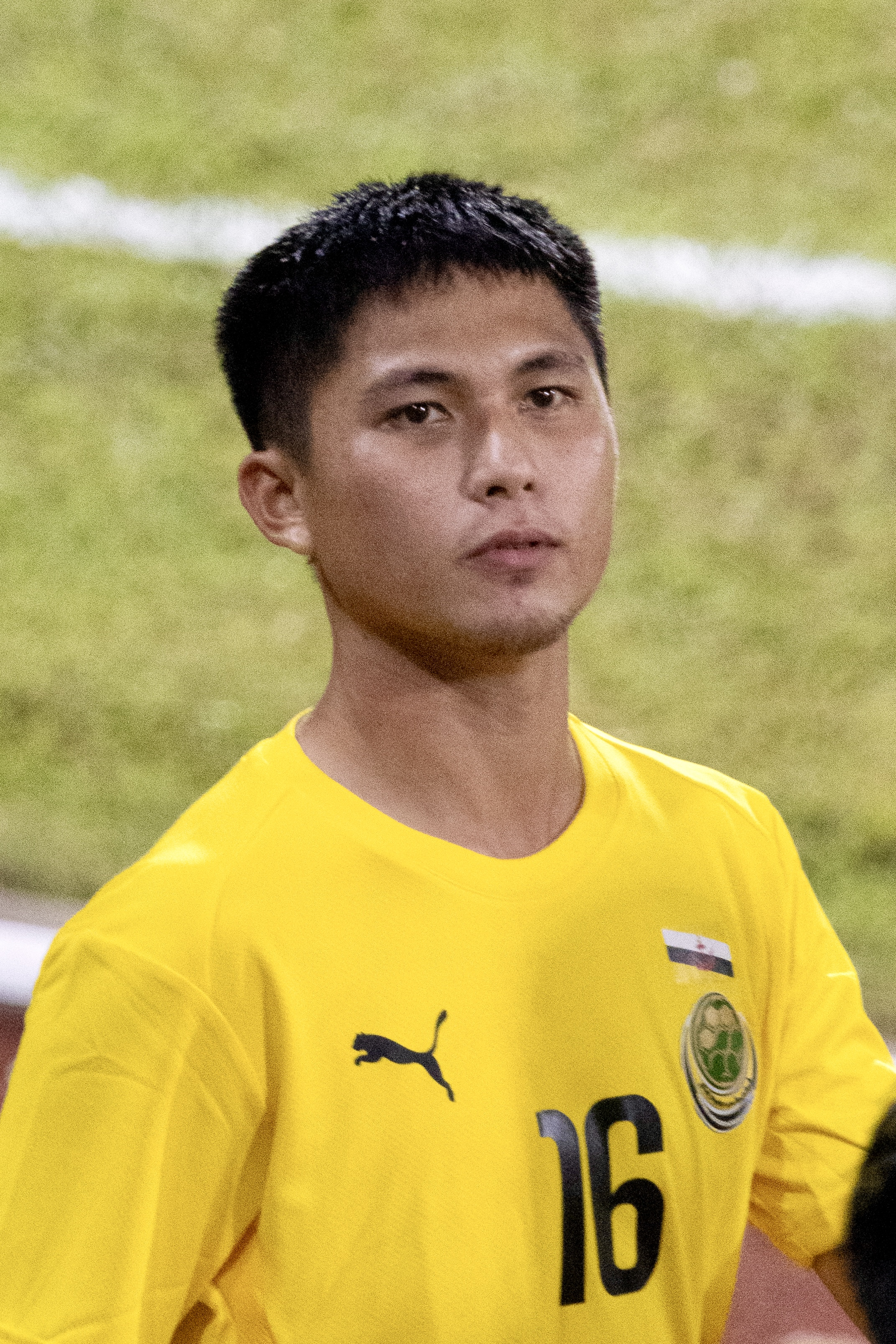
- Abdul Hariz with Brunei in 2024

Personal information
- Full name: Abdul Hariz @ Amani bin Herman
- Date of birth: 24 September 2000 (age 26)
- Place of birth: Kuala Belait, Brunei Darussalam
- Height: 1.65 m (5 ft 5 in)
- Position: Midfielder

Team information
- Current team: DPMM
- Number: 16

Youth career
- 2015–2017: Tabuan Muda

Senior career*
Years	Team	Apps	(Gls)
2016	Tabuan U17		(1)
2017	Tabuan Muda 'A'		(4)
2018	DPMM	4	(0)
2019	Kasuka		(2)
2021–2023	MS ABDB	14	(1)
2024–	DPMM	40	(0)

International career^{‡}
2015	Brunei U16	5	(1)
2015–2018	Brunei U19	10	(1)
2018	Brunei U21	3	(0)
2019–2022	Brunei U23	6	(0)
2022–	Brunei	23	(1)
- * Club domestic league appearances and goals as of 20 November 2026 ‡ National team caps and goals as of 21 November 2026

Laskar Abdul Hariz @ Amani bin Herman (born 24 September 2000) is a Bruneian footballer who plays as a midfielder for DPMM FC and the Brunei national team.

== Club career ==
A native of Belait in west Brunei Darussalam, Hariz attended St. James' School in Kuala Belait. A youth international since 2015, he began playing club football with the under-17 side of Tabuan Muda which played in the 2016 Brunei Premier League. His first club goal was when he scored the match-winner against Rimba Star on 2 April. That goal helped Tabuan U17 finish in third place, with 18 points from nine matches. They also reached the semi-finals of the DST FA Cup where they were beaten by Najip I-Team in a feisty encounter.

Hariz moved up to the 'A' team of Tabuan Muda for the 2017 Brunei Super League season. He played regularly for Takao Fujiwara's boys and contributed four goals in that season, including the leveller in a 2–2 draw against Lun Bawang on 9 July. Tabuan Muda 'A' finished the season in sixth place.

After his inclusion to the full national team, Hariz was signed by Brunei Darussalam's professional club DPMM in February 2018 after a trial. He made his debut at home against Albirex Niigata (S) in a 1–3 loss on 7 August later that year.

After making four appearances for the Gegar Gegar men, Hariz left DPMM FC for Kasuka FC in 2019, scoring two goals in his short stint there. He joined MS ABDB in 2021. He played for the army's football team until the beginning of 2024 when he re-signed for DPMM for the 2024–25 Singapore Premier League season.

On 24 August 2024, Hariz made the starting eleven for the first time in DPMM colours, playing away against Geylang International in place of the suspended Azwan Ali Rahman. His club managed to win 2–4 at Jalan Besar Stadium.

== International career ==
=== Youth ===
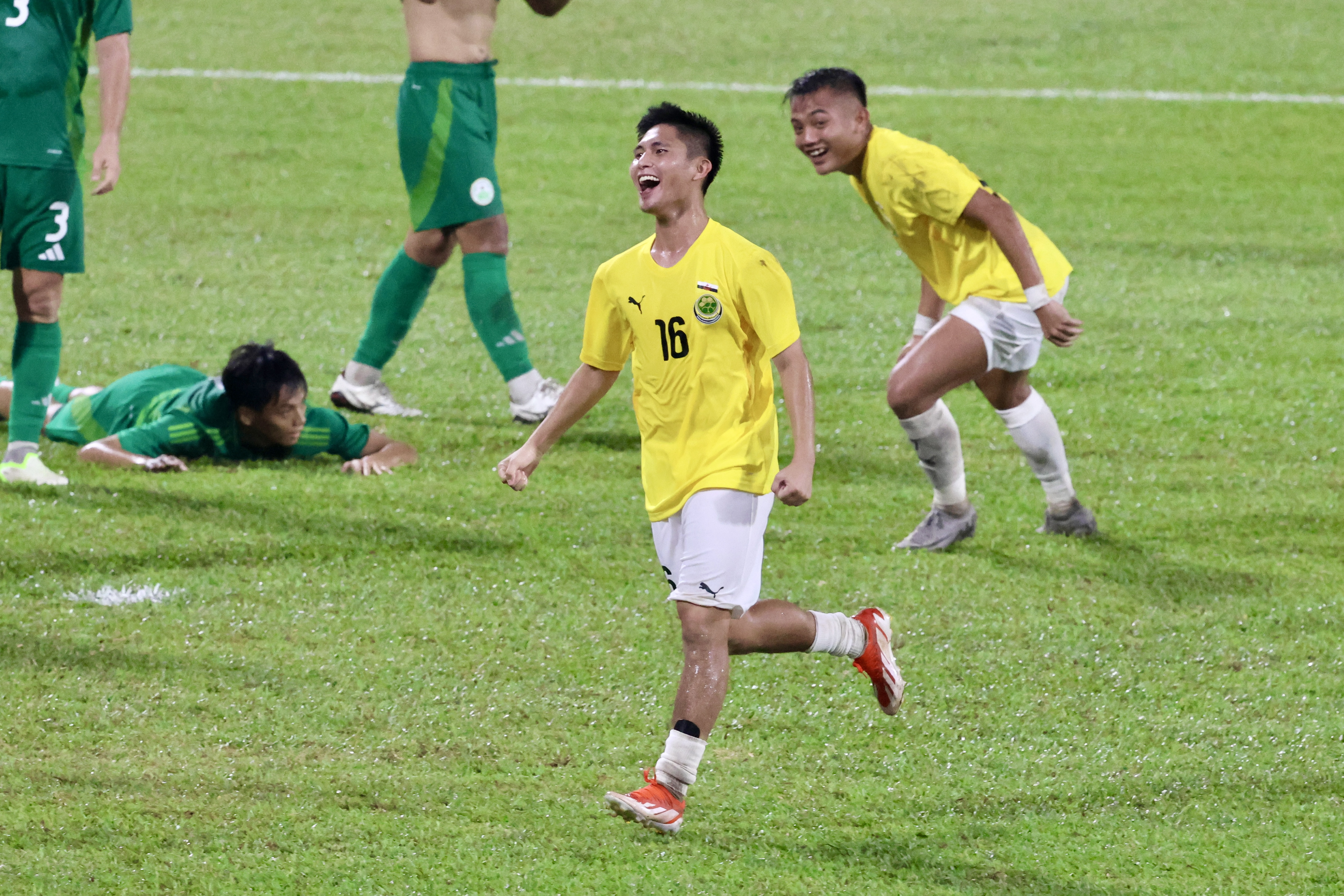
Hariz celebrating his goal against Macau at the 2027 AFC Asian Cup qualification

Hariz's first international tournament was the 2015 AFF U-16 Youth Championship hosted by Cambodia in July–August. He scored a consolation in the 66th minute against Vietnam in the second group game which Brunei lost 1–6. He appeared in all five matches as Brunei finished bottom of their table. He was pushed into a higher age category a month later at the 2016 AFC U-19 Championship qualification matches that were held in Myanmar. Brunei only retained five players from the squad that went to Laos for the 2015 AFF U-19 Youth Championship a month ago. Appearing against Vietnam and Hong Kong, Hariz suffered a 0–5 drubbing in both games.

Two years later, Hariz travelled with Tabuan Muda 'A' to Myanmar for the 2017 AFF U-18 Youth Championship. After a thrilling 2–3 win over the Philippines, heavy defeats by Vietnam, Myanmar and Indonesia curtailed the Young Wasps' progress to the knockout phase. The following November, Hariz was back on board for the 2018 AFC U-19 Championship qualification games to be played in Paju, South Korea. In the first match against Indonesia, he directed a header into his own net for the second goal in a 5–0 loss. This was followed by a 0–11 whitewash by the home team. Brunei fared better in the next match against neighbours Malaysia when the Young Wasps managed to frustrate their opponents right until the 76th minute. Blocking an attempt at goal, Hariz unfortunately deflected Zafuan Azeman's shot which looped past Abdul Mutalip Muhammad to give Malaysia a 1–0 win.

Despite the setbacks, Hariz never lost heart coming into the final game against Timor-Leste. Getting the nod to start the game by Fujiwara, Hariz netted a goal in the 34th minute to level the match after Danilson had given Timor-Leste the lead. The match ended in a 2–2 draw after further goals by Hanif Aiman Adanan and Danilson from the penalty spot.

In February 2022, Hariz was selected for the under-23s to compete in the 2022 AFF U-23 Youth Championship held in Cambodia. He made three appearances in as many matches as Brunei failed to get a single point from the competition.

=== Senior ===
Due to his performances in the local league as well as in his international youth appearances, Hariz earned a callup to the Brunei national team for the 2017 Aceh World Solidarity Tsunami Cup organised by Indonesia that December. Had the tournament be classified as full 'A'-international matches as previously planned, his second-half appearance against Indonesia would have made Hariz the first Bruneian international that was born after the millennium.

In March 2022, Hariz was selected for the full national team for a friendly against Laos away in Vientiane. He made his international debut in the game, starting in midfield in a 3–2 loss. He followed this with another start against Malaysia at a friendly in Kuala Lumpur on 27 May in a 4–0 defeat to the hosts.

Hariz fell out of favour with Mario Rivera and it was not until March 2024 when the latter finally gave Hariz a callup for the 2024 FIFA Series that was held in Saudi Arabia. He made the starting eleven against Bermuda where they lost 2–0, and against Vanuatu, in this instance the Wasps managed to win 3–2 when Hakeme Yazid Said rifled in a direct free kick in the third minute of stoppage time for the winning goal.

Hariz made two substitute appearances for the Wasps in two friendlies against Sri Lanka that was held in Brunei in June 2024.

In September 2024, Hariz made the Brunei selection for a two-legged play-off against Macau to advance to the third qualifying round of the 2027 Asian Cup. He was given a start by Jamie McAllister in the first leg at Bandar Seri Begawan on the 6th, and went on to score his first international goal and his team's third in a resounding 3–0 win. He was also kept in the starting eleven for the return leg four days later, claiming a 0–1 victory that advances Brunei to the next round of the competition.

The same selection faced Timor-Leste for the 2024 ASEAN Championship qualification over two legs in early October. Hariz made two starts for the Wasps as they suffered a 0–1 aggregate defeat which eliminated them from the year's biennial tournament.

Brunei opened their 2027 AFC Asian Cup qualification campaign with an away fixture on 25 March 2025 against Lebanon to be held in Doha, Qatar instead due to regional conflict. The squad included Hariz and he was subsequently handed a starting place in central midfield by Fabio Maciel. The designated home team were victorious with five unanswered goals. In the next fixture against Bhutan on 10 June, Hariz kept his place and marshalled the Wasps to victory at home, prevailing 2–1. In the later months of 2025, Hariz played from the start in both October home and away fixtures against Yemen as well as Lebanon at home at the same tournament, suffering three losses. He was also in the starting lineup for the away game against Bhutan on 31 March 2026 for the final Asian Cup qualification fixture and the game ended in a 2–1 loss.

Hariz was played from the start in both legs of the 2026 ASEAN Championship qualification against Timor-Leste in the following June, where Brunei were eliminated by a 1–6 aggregate loss. In September the same year, Hariz kept his place in central midfield against Laos and Hong Kong at the 2026 FIFA ASEAN Cup, both games ending in defeat for the Wasps. Later in November, he was given the armband by Helme Panjang for the Wasps' participation of the 2026 King's Cup in Thailand. Hariz captained Brunei against both the hosts and Oman, resulting in two heavy losses.

== International goals ==
No.	Date	Venue	Opponent	Score	Result	Competition
1.	6 September 2024	Hassanal Bolkiah National Stadium, Bandar Seri Begawan, Brunei	Macau	3–0	3–0	2027 AFC Asian Cup qualification
