= Setia Perdana FC =

Setia Perdana
- Full name: Setia Perdana Football Club
- Founded: 2005; 20 years ago
- Ground: Various
- Owner: Zainudin Ismail
- Chairman: Hanaf Zaharuddin
- Head coach: Lalim Piut
- Coach: Sofrin Serudin
- 2023: BSL, 14th of 16

Setia Perdana Football Club is a professional football club in Brunei. The club is named after the village of Setia 'A' in Sungai Kebun, Kampong Ayer.

== History ==
=== Establishment ===
Setia Perdana FC was founded in 2005 by Haji Piut bin Mahrup, who recruited youths from Kampong Setia 'A'. From 2005 to 2009, the team played in the Brunei-Muara District League for 4 years. Initially, this squad was composed of family members, near relatives like cousins, and even locals. They competed at the lower district levels for several years until when the newly formed National Football Association of Brunei Darussalam organised a competition to determine the clubs which would contest a new Brunei football top flight in 2011. Setia Perdana finished third behind LLRC FT and Najip FC, placing them in the second level which began in 2014.

=== Success ===
The players who will compete in the BSL are young players who have talent and have already played in a number of district and premier league matches, according to Sofrin Serudin, the coach of Setia Perdana FC. The majority of the players were from the previous PARMA FC Academy, a youth football club that in 2015 was run by Setia Perdana FC. When they became 18, they simultaneously represented the team. After three consecutive fifth-place finishes in the second tier, Setia Perdana became champions of the 2017 Brunei Premier League. They were promoted to the Brunei Super League in the 2018–19 season and have been a member of the top flight ever since.

=== Present day ===
The Setia Perdana FC entered a new age in 2018 and will confront a super league environment that is quite different and full of obstacles. In order to prepare the team for this environment, hard work from all team members may be necessary. After a heavy 11–0 defeat against Kasuka FC at the Berakas Sports Complex, Setia Perdana had a harsh debut from that DST Super League match. Sofrin, is certain that Setia Perdana FC can fight without the help of well-known or foreign players. He is certain that the majority of his players 80% are young athletes from the PARMA Academy, who also serve as the backbone of the new supporters.

== Current squad ==
As of 15 May 2023

Note: Flags indicate national team as defined under FIFA eligibility rules; some limited exceptions apply. Players may hold more than one non-FIFA nationality.

| No. | Pos. | Nation | Player |
|---|---|---|---|
| 1 | GK | (Brunei) BRU | Said Hamzah |
| 2 | DF | (Brunei) BRU | Hafiz Matussin |
| 3 | DF | (Brunei) BRU | Fathannul Arfan Ratano |
| 4 | DF | (Brunei) BRU | Ahmad Dani Alimin Wirmawan |
| 5 | DF | (Brunei) BRU | Saiful Rizal Bakar |
| 6 | DF | (Brunei) BRU | Azminuddin Saifullah Azrey |
| 7 | MF | (Brunei) BRU | Hafirul Roslan |
| 8 | FW | (Brunei) BRU | Zakwan Wan Afrezal |
| 9 | FW | (Brunei) BRU | Fadzli Al-Fattah Riduan |
| 10 | FW | (Brunei) BRU | Aqmar Izzat Ismail |
| 11 | MF | (Brunei) BRU | Khairul Abdul Halim (Captain) |
| 12 | DF | (Brunei) BRU | Waie Syazwan Rozanan |
| 13 | GK | (Brunei) BRU | Hazirul Izzuddin Noordin |
| 15 | MF | (Brunei) BRU | Ake Hariri |
| 16 | MF | (Brunei) BRU | Rafiuddin Yussof |

| No. | Pos. | Nation | Player |
|---|---|---|---|
| 17 | FW | (Brunei) BRU | Ahmad Syafie Adnan |
| 18 | MF | (Brunei) BRU | Zulfadzley Hazwan Julaihi |
| 19 | FW | (Brunei) BRU | Ahmad Indra Anarky Wirmawan |
| 20 | DF | (Brunei) BRU | Aiman Amat |
| 21 | MF | (Brunei) BRU | Hisyamudin Suhaili |
| 22 | FW | (Brunei) BRU | Rahimni Pundut |
| 23 | MF | (Brunei) BRU | Rusydi Said Adak |
| 24 | MF | (Brunei) BRU | Alif Hasnan |
| 25 | GK | (Brunei) BRU | Hasbullah Abdullah |
| 26 | MF | (Brunei) BRU | Adi Sya'rani Roslan |
| 27 | DF | (Brunei) BRU | Syamsudin Samsul |
| 28 | MF | (Brunei) BRU | Nabeel Min Fadhillah Abdul Majid |
| 29 | MF | (Brunei) BRU | Najib Min Fadhillah Abdul Majid |
| 30 | MF | (Brunei) BRU | Amiruddin Azmain |

== Honours ==
- Brunei Premier League
  - Champions (1): 2017
- Brunei-Muara District League
  - Champions (1): 2009
