= Tabuan Muda =

- Founded: 2015
- Dissolved: 2020
- League: Brunei Super League
- 2018: Brunei Premier League, 2nd (promoted)

Tabuan Muda (transl. Young Wasps) was a Bruneian football team that played in the Bruneian football league system, under the management of the National Football Association of Brunei Darussalam. The team was formed in 2015 to prepare Brunei's youth international teams for their participation in upcoming regional and international tournaments.

== Naming ==
The Standard Malay word for 'wasp' is tebuan but due to the Brunei Malay voweling system, the word becomes tabuan when vocalised locally. The team was named Tabuan Muda possibly to symbolise originality, noting that the senior Brunei national football team is still nicknamed as Skuad Tebuan regularly in a number of Malay publications.

== History ==
=== Predecessor ===
In 2009, the Football Federation of Brunei Darussalam which at that time administered the Brunei Premier League had placed the Brunei under-16 team in Premier League II for the 2009–10 season. The following season they were renamed as Brunei Youth Team. After FIFA would only recognise NFABD instead of FFBD as terms of Brunei's reinstatement into FIFA in 2011, the league was discontinued and the team was disbanded as a result.

Many of these players have gone on to win the 2012 Hassanal Bolkiah Trophy a year later, and are currently established Brunei internationals. The players include Azwan Ali Rahman, Shafie Effendy, Nur Ikhwan Othman, Aminuddin Zakwan Tahir and Fakhrul Zulhazmi Yussof.

=== 2015 season ===
Two teams were formed by NFABD at the beginning of the season, namely Tabuan Muda which consisted of the national under-23 squad for the 28th SEA Games and Tabuan U18 for the 2015 AFF U-19 Youth Championship and the 2016 AFC U-19 Championship qualification. Preparation for Tabuan Muda included a mid-season training camp to Japan where they played three exhibition matches. Tabuan Muda finished fifth in the 2015 Brunei Super League, and came out of the SEA Games campaign without any points gained from five matches. Tabuan U18 finished second in the 2015 Brunei Premier League but cannot be promoted due to its status as a "feeder club" for a Super League team, and had similarly poor results with their U23 counterparts in their international outings.

Towards the end of the season, a match against Indera SC was prematurely ended by a referee who had sent off three Indera players and mistakenly applied Law 3 of the Laws of the Game (which the competition rules are based on) which actually states that a match cannot continue with fewer than seven players, not eight. A replay was scheduled on a Sunday but this time Tabuan Muda did not show up with enough players, which resulted in a $500 fine imposed by NFABD, a peculiar instance where a football association fines itself.

=== 2016 season ===
For the Super League, Tabuan Muda was renamed Tabuan U21 for the 2016 season since the team now consists of the national under-21 team presumably to prepare for a possible Hassanal Bolkiah Trophy, or the SEA Games in 2017. The Premier League team became Tabuan U17 which was the under 17-team of Brunei.

After only one round of league action, Tabuan U21 finished in fifth place but managed to win the Fair Play award. Tabuan U17 fared better in third place.

=== 2017 season ===
The 2017 iteration of Tabuan Muda involved the Tabuan Muda 'A' and Tabuan Muda 'B' teams that were placed in the Super League and Premier League respectively. The 'A' team were the national under-18 team while the 'B' team was made up of the under-17s. Tabuan Muda 'A' took part in the 2018 AFC U-19 Championship qualification matches that were held in South Korea in October, and gained a solitary point via a 2–2 draw against Timor-Leste. As preparation, they embarked on an 11-day training camp in Japan on 21 August.

At the conclusion of the two leagues, the 'A' team finished in sixth place while the 'B' team finished in seventh.

=== 2018 season ===
Only one Tabuan Muda team played in the 2018–19 season of the Brunei Premier League which began in January 2019. They finished second in the league behind league re-entrants DPMM FC, managing to draw the academy side 1–1 in the final fixture.

=== 2020 season ===
The Tabuan team was included in the expanded 2020 Brunei Super League which was scheduled to run from February to November. The league was ultimately cancelled due to the COVID-19 pandemic.

== See also ==
- (Philippines) Azkals Development Team
- (Singapore) Young Lions
