= Brunei national under-23 football team =

National association football team

Brunei Under-23
- Nickname(s): Tabuan Muda (Young Wasps)
- Association: Football Association of Brunei Darussalam
- Head coach: Aminuddin Jumat
- Home stadium: Hassanal Bolkiah National Stadium
- FIFA code: BRU
First colours	Second colours

Biggest win
- Brunei 2–1 Philippines (Jakarta, Indonesia; November 2011)

Biggest defeat
- Qatar 13–0 Brunei (Doha, Qatar; 3 September 2025)

SEA Games
- Appearances: 6 (first in 2001)
- Best result: Group Stage

Brunei national under-23 football team (also known as Brunei Under-23, Brunei U-23 or Brunei Olympic Team) represents Brunei in international football competitions in Olympic Games, Asian Games and SEA Games, as well as any other under-23 international football tournaments.

== Kit ==
The traditional colour of Brunei's home kit is predominantly yellow with black and white streaks, as homage to the flag of Brunei. The current away jersey colour is dark blue-green.

Kit manufacturer	Year
(Germany) Adidas	1998–2001
(England) Mitre	2002–2007
(Italy) Lotto Sport Italia	2008–2020
(Brunei) FABD	2022–2024
(Germany) Puma	2024–

== Tournament records ==
=== Olympic Games ===
Summer Olympic Games Record
Year	Result	Position	Pld	W	D	L	GF	GA
(Spain) 1992	Did Not Enter							
(United States) 1996	Did Not Enter							
(Australia) 2000	Did Not Enter							
(Greece) 2004	Did Not Enter							
(China) 2008	Did Not Enter							
(United Kingdom) 2012	Did Not Enter							
(Brazil) 2016	Did not qualify							
(Japan) 2020	Did not qualify							
(France) 2024	Did not qualify							
(United States) 2028	To be determined							
Total	-	0 / 7	-	-	-	-	-	-

=== Asian Games ===
Asian Games Record
Year	Round	Position	GP	W	D*	L	GS	GA
(South Korea) 2002	Did Not Enter							
(Qatar) 2006	Did Not Enter							
(China) 2010	Did Not Enter							
(South Korea) 2014	Did Not Enter							
(Indonesia) 2018	Did Not Enter							
(China) 2022	Did Not Enter							
Total	0/6	-	-	-	-	-	-	-

- Since 2002, football at the Asian Games changes into an Under-23 tournament.

=== SEA Games ===
SEA Games Record
Year	Round	Position	GP	W	D*	L	GS	GA
(Malaysia) 2001	Round 1	9/9	3	0	0	3	1	19
(Vietnam) 2003	Did Not Participate							
(Philippines) 2005	Withdrew							
(Thailand) 2007	Did Not Participate							
(Laos) 2009	Did Not Participate							
(Indonesia) 2011	Round 1	9/11	5	1	1	3	5	17
(Myanmar) 2013	Round 1	10/10	4	0	0	4	2	14
(Singapore) 2015	Round 1	11/11	5	0	0	5	2	17
(Malaysia) 2017	Round 1	11/11	4	0	0	4	1	12
(Philippines) 2019	Round 1	11/11	5	0	0	5	0	31
(Vietnam) 2021	Did Not Participate							
(Cambodia) 2023	Did Not Participate							
(Thailand) 2025	Did Not Participate							
Total	6/12	Best: 9th	26	1	1	25	11	110

- Since 2001, football at the Southeast Asian Games changes into Under-23 tournament.

=== AFC U-23 Asian Cup ===
AFC U-23 Asian Cup
Year	Round	GP	W	D	L	GF	GA
(Oman) 2013	Did Not Enter						
(Qatar) 2016	Did not qualify						
(China) 2018	Did not qualify						
(Thailand) 2020	Did not qualify						
(Uzbekistan) 2022	Withdrew						
(Qatar) 2024	Did not qualify						
(Saudi Arabia) 2026	Did not qualify						
(Japan) 2028	To be determined						
Total	0/8	-	-	-	-	-	-

*Denotes draws include knockout matches decided on penalty kicks.

=== ASEAN U-23 Championship ===
Year	Round	Pld	W	T	L	GF	GA
(Thailand) 2005	Did not enter						
(Indonesia) 2011	Cancelled						
(Cambodia) 2019	Withdrew						
(Cambodia) 2022	Group stage	3	0	0	3	2	11
(Thailand) 2023	Group stage	3	0	0	3	1	12
(Indonesia) 2025	Group stage	3	0	0	3	1	17
Total	Best: Group stage	9	0	0	9	4	40

== Fixtures and results ==
Win Draw Lose

== Coaching staff ==
Position	Name
Head coach	(Brunei) Aminuddin Jumat
Team manager	(Brunei) Ah Chua Bangau
Assistant coach	(Brunei) Zainuddin Kassim
Goalkeeper coach	(Brunei) Omar Nur Aqammaddin Sallehuddin
Kitman	(Brunei) Roney Morni
Media officer	(Brunei) Khairi Zuhair

== Squad ==
=== Current squad ===
Squad for the 2026 AFC U-23 Asian Cup qualification held in Qatar in September 2025.

No.	Pos.	Player	Date of birth (age)	Caps	Goals	Club
1	GK	Khairul Hisyam Norihwan	7 August 2004 (age 22)	5	0	Indera
18	GK	Riyan Aiman Jali	9 January 2003 (age 23)	1	0	Unattached
20	GK	Wa'ie Haziq Wardun	4 August 2005 (age 21)	0	0	(Football Association of Brunei Darussalam) Kasuka
2	DF	Abdul Qayyum Irwan Rino	14 August 2004 (age 22)	3	0	(Football Association of Brunei Darussalam) Rimba Star
3	DF	Danisyh Syariee Masrazni (captain)	11 September 2004 (age 22)	7	0	Unattached
4	DF	Azrin Danial Yusra	11 February 2006 (age 20)	6	0	(Football Association of Brunei Darussalam) DPMM II
5	DF	Wafiq Danish Hasimulabdillah	13 January 2005 (age 21)	13	1	(Football Association of Brunei Darussalam) Kasuka
6	DF	Abdul Hafiy Herman	6 February 2005 (age 21)	8	0	(Football Association of Brunei Darussalam) KB
12	DF	Hadif Mansur Zulkarman	27 July 2004 (age 22)	3	0	(Football Association of Brunei Darussalam) MS ABDB
13	DF	Danish Aiman Sahrizul	23 January 2007 (age 19)	4	0	Unattached
15	DF	Abdul Raziq Saiful Faisal	1 December 2006 (age 19)	4	0	Unattached
16	DF	Irfan Abdullah Ikhwan Chin	6 January 2006 (age 20)	5	0	(Football Association of Brunei Darussalam) Wijaya
22	DF	Danish Firdaus Roddy Suhardy	23 January 2006 (age 20)	2	0	Unattached
23	DF	Raiezarizal Radimas	4 December 2003 (age 22)	3	0	(Football Association of Brunei Darussalam) MS PPDB
7	MF	Ali Munawwar Abdul Rahman	30 June 2004 (age 22)	11	0	(Football Association of Brunei Darussalam) MS ABDB
8	MF	Danish Bazli Sumardy	9 May 2005 (age 21)	2	0	(Football Association of Brunei Darussalam) Kuala Belait
14	MF	Hadi Aiman Hamizal	15 August 2006 (age 20)	5	0	(Football Association of Brunei Darussalam) Indera
17	MF	Azhari Danial Yusra	30 June 2003 (age 23)	5	0	(Football Association of Brunei Darussalam) Indera
21	MF	Shad Maymoun Jaafar	17 August 2003 (age 23)	2	0	(Football Association of Brunei Darussalam) Panchor Murai
9	FW	Al-Kholil Sapawi	18 November 2005 (age 20)	5	0	Unattached
10	FW	Bazli Aminuddin	24 June 2003 (age 23)	12	0	(Football Association of Brunei Darussalam) Wijaya
11	FW	Shah Rizan Reymoon	27 September 2003 (age 23)	2	0	(Football Association of Brunei Darussalam) Rimba Star
19	FW	Haziq Naqiuddin Syamra	26 May 2004 (age 22)	13	1	(Football Association of Brunei Darussalam) DPMM II

== Coaching history ==
Caretaker coaches are listed in italics.

- (South Korea) Choi Yeong-joon (2001)
- (Brunei) Dayem Ali (2011)
- (South Korea) Kwon Oh-son (2013)
- (Singapore) Stephen Ng Heng Seng (2015)
- (South Korea) Kwon Oh-son (2017)
- (Singapore) Stephen Ng Heng Seng (2019)
- (Brunei) Aminuddin Jumat (2019–2022)
- (Japan) Atsushi Hanita (2023)
- (Brunei) Aminuddin Jumat (2025–)

== See also ==
- Brunei national football team
