= List of Brunei Super League hat-tricks =

This is a list of association football players that have scored three goals (or a hat-trick) or more in a single match in the Brunei Super League since its first edition in 2012. The first person who achieved this was Safuan Juhar for LLRC FT on 16 December 2012 against Najip FC.

== Hat-tricks ==
Note
^{4}	Player scored four goals
^{5}	Player scored five goals
^{6}	Player scored six goals
^{7}	Player scored seven goals
^{8}	Player scored eight goals

List of Brunei Super League hat-tricks
#	Player	Nationality	For	Against	Result	Date	Ref
1	Safuan Juhar^{4}	Brunei	LLRC FT	Najip FC	7–5	16 December 2012	
2	Abu Bakar Mahari	Brunei	Jerudong FC	Najip FC	6–0	23 December 2012	
3	Hamizan Aziz Sulaiman	Brunei	Indera SC	Wijaya FC	7–3	23 December 2012	
4	Hamizan Aziz Sulaiman^{8}	Brunei	Indera SC	Najip FC	20–1	26 January 2013	
5	Azwan Ali Rahman^{7}	Brunei	Indera SC	Najip FC	20–1	26 January 2013	
6	Abdul Azizi Ali Rahman^{6}	Brunei	MS ABDB	Najip FC	11–1	1 February 2013	
7	Hafis Mahari	Brunei	QAF FC	Kilanas FC	4–3	3 February 2013	
8	Budiman Jumat	Brunei	MS ABDB	Kilanas FC	4–3	3 March 2013	
9	Hafis Mahari	Brunei	QAF FC	Najip FC	9–2	9 March 2013	
10	Haikal Zaidi	Brunei	LLRC FT	Wijaya FC	3–1	2 May 2014	
11	Jasriman Johari	Brunei	MS PDB	Kilanas FC	6–1	12 May 2014	
12	Reduan Petara	Brunei	Indera SC	Jerudong FC	6–0	1 June 2014	
13	Mardi Mirza Abdullah	Brunei	QAF FC	Wijaya FC	8–0	26 June 2014	
14	Hamizan Aziz Sulaiman	Brunei	Indera SC	QAF FC	7–1	2 August 2014	
15	Abdul Azizi Ali Rahman	Brunei	MS ABDB	IKLS FC	5–0	11 August 2015	
16	Hardi Bujang	Brunei	Jerudong FC	MS ABDB	3–2	16 August 2015	
17	Nur Syazwan Halidi	Brunei	Tabuan Muda	Lun Bawang	5–1	16 August 2015	
18	Fazizzul Hussin	Brunei	MS PDB	Kilanas FC	4–1	17 August 2015	
19	Razimie Ramlli	Brunei	MS ABDB	MS PDB	4–0	11 September 2015	
20	Nur Syazwan Halidi	Brunei	Tabuan Muda	Kilanas FC	5–2	13 September 2015	
21	Azri Zahari^{4}	Brunei	Najip FC	IKLS FC	5–3	26 October 2015	
22	Nur Syazwan Halidi	Brunei	Tabuan Muda	MS PDB	5–1	20 November 2015	
23	Hardi Bujang	Brunei	Jerudong FC	IKLS FC	8–0	29 November 2015	
24	Hamizan Aziz Sulaiman^{4}	Brunei	Indera SC	Jerudong FC	7–0	12 March 2016	
25	Abdul Azizi Ali Rahman	Brunei	MS ABDB	Jerudong FC	6–1	23 April 2016	
26	Abdul Azizi Ali Rahman	Brunei	MS ABDB	Indera SC	5–0	16 August 2016	
27	Esmendy Ibrahim	Brunei	Kasuka FC	Jerudong FC	5–0	24 April 2017	
28	Abu Bakar Mahari^{4}	Brunei	Kota Ranger	Menglait FC	6–0	26 April 2017	
29	Asri Aspar	Brunei	Indera SC	MS PDB	6–0	2 August 2017	
30	Petrus Jumat	Brunei	Lun Bawang	Menglait FC	9–2	6 August 2017	
31	Yunus Lupat	Brunei	Lun Bawang	Menglait FC	9–2	6 August 2017	
32	Faiz Farhan Kamat	Brunei	Najip FC	MS PDB	3–3	6 August 2017	
33	Hamizan Aziz Sulaiman	Brunei	Indera SC	MS ABDB	3–2	15 September 2017	
34	Abu Bakar Mahari	Brunei	Kota Ranger	Menglait FC	5–1	17 September 2017	
35	Shafie Effendy	Brunei	Indera SC	Najip FC	6–0	26 September 2017	
36	Razimie Ramlli	Brunei	MS ABDB	Kota Ranger	4–1	29 September 2017	
37	Marhazif Ahad	Brunei	Wijaya FC	Najip FC	4–2	11 October 2017	
38	Asri Aspar^{5}	Brunei	Indera SC	Menglait FC	9–0	13 October 2017	
39	Abdul Azizi Ali Rahman^{4}	Brunei	MS ABDB	Kasuka FC	5–0	17 November 2017	
40	Amir Anak Bujang	Brunei	Lun Bawang	Menglait FC	7–0	14 January 2018	
41	Hanif Aiman Adanan^{4}	Brunei	Kasuka FC	Setia Perdana	11–0	28 October 2018	
42	Nur Asyraffahmi Norsamri	Brunei	Kota Ranger	IKLS FC	5–1	16 November 2018	
43	Razimie Ramlli^{4}	Brunei	MS ABDB	Najip-BAKES	5–0	23 November 2018	
44	Norfariz Sayang	Brunei	Wijaya FC	IKLS FC	3–1	30 November 2018	
45	Amalul Said	Brunei	Kota Ranger	Najip-BAKES	7–1	9 December 2018	
46	Razimie Ramlli	Brunei	MS ABDB	Najip-BAKES	4–1	4 January 2019	
47	Anaqi Sufi Omar Baki	Brunei	Wijaya FC	Kota Ranger	4–3	18 January 2019	
48	Reduan Petara	Brunei	Kasuka FC	Lun Bawang	5–0	24 February 2019	
49	Farish Aryan Abdul Rahman	Brunei	MS PDB	Najip FC	4–1	1 March 2019	
50	Khairul Abdul Halim	Brunei	Setia Perdana	Lun Bawang	5–1	3 March 2019	
51	Hanif Aiman Adanan^{5}	Brunei	Kasuka FC	Najip FC	8–1	12 April 2019	
52	Asri Aspar^{4}	Brunei	Indera SC	IKLS FC	6–1	12 April 2019	
53	Fadhli Salleh	Brunei	MS ABDB	IKLS MB-5	6–0	29 February 2020	
54	Maududi Hilmi Kasmi^{4}	Brunei	Kasuka FC	Panchor Murai	11–1	20 June 2021	
55	Samuel Kojo Abbey	Ghana	Kasuka FC	Panchor Murai	11–1	20 June 2021	
56	Adi Said^{5}	Brunei	Kota Ranger	Panchor Murai	11–0	27 June 2021	
57	Leon Sullivan Taylor	Liberia	Kasuka FC	MS PPDB	4–0	27 June 2021	
58	Charlie Clough^{5}	England	DPMM FC	BAKES FC	16–1	27 June 2021	
59	Andrey Varankow	Belarus	DPMM FC	BAKES FC	16–1	27 June 2021	
60	Aimmil Rahman Ramlee	Brunei	Indera SC	Rimba Star	10–0	27 June 2021	
61	Razimie Ramlli	Brunei	DPMM FC	BAKES FC	16–1	27 June 2021	
62	Azwan Ali Rahman	Brunei	DPMM FC	BAKES FC	16–1	27 June 2021	
63	Leon Sullivan Taylor	Liberia	Kasuka FC	BSRC FC	4–0	4 July 2021	
64	Faturrahman Embran	Brunei	Kota Ranger	BAKES FC	9–1	4 July 2021	
65	Babatunde Abiodun	Nigeria	Kota Ranger	BAKES FC	9–1	4 July 2021	
66	Andrey Varankow^{4}	Belarus	DPMM FC	Rimba Star	15–0	4 July 2021	
67	Hamizan Aziz Sulaiman	Brunei	Indera SC	Jerudong FC	7–0	4 July 2021	
68	Shah Razen Said	Brunei	DPMM FC	Rimba Star	15–0	4 July 2021	
69	Hariz Danial Khallidden	Brunei	MS ABDB	BAKES FC	4–1	11 July 2021	
70	Andrey Varankow^{7}	Belarus	DPMM FC	BSRC FC	13–0	11 July 2021	
71	Leon Sullivan Taylor	Liberia	Kasuka FC	KB FC	3–0	11 July 2021	
72	Adi Said	Brunei	Kota Ranger	KB FC	5–0	19 July 2021	
73	Brian Lim Yong Song	Brunei	Wijaya FC	Rimba Star	7–1	19 July 2021	
74	Shunya Ando^{4}	Japan	Kasuka FC	BAKES FC	9–0	25 July 2021	
75	Leon Sullivan Taylor^{4}	Liberia	Kasuka FC	BAKES FC	9–0	25 July 2021	
76	Safuan Juhar	Brunei	BSRC FC	Jerudong FC	7–0	25 July 2021	
77	Andrey Varankow^{6}	Belarus	DPMM FC	Wijaya FC	8–0	25 July 2021	
78	Marhazif Ahad	Brunei	Wijaya FC	Setia Perdana FC	6–0	5 March 2023	
79	Hazrul Mohammed	Brunei	AKSE Bersatu	Panchor Murai FC	7–1	14 May 2023	
80	Amir Hamzah^{4}	Indonesia	Rimba Star FC	IKLS-MB5 FC	5–2	14 May 2023	
81	Haziq Baihaqi Abdullah	Brunei	MS PPDB	Panchor Murai	4–1	28 May 2023	
82	Bismark Owusu	Ghana	Kasuka FC	BAKES FC	8–1	28 May 2023	
83	Leon Sullivan Taylor^{4}	Liberia	Indera SC	BSRC FC	6–0	4 June 2023	
84	Rosalvo Cândido	Brazil	Kasuka FC	Jerudong FC	8–1	26 June 2023	
85	Adi Said	Brunei	Kasuka FC	Jerudong FC	8–1	26 June 2023	
86	Abdul Azim Abdul Rasid	Brunei	MS PPDB	Setia Perdana FC	6–0	26 June 2023	
87	Aimmil Rahman Ramlee	Brunei	Indera SC	Panchor Murai FC	10–0	2 July 2023	
88	Nizamuddin Ismail	Brunei	MS PPDB	IKLS-MB5 FC	6–0	5 July 2023	
89	Babatunde Abiodun	Nigeria	AKSE Bersatu	Jerudong FC	6–1	7 July 2023	
90	Leon Sullivan Taylor^{5}	Liberia	Indera SC	BAKES FC	6–0	9 July 2023	
91	Zineddine Rafik	Morocco	Indera SC	Setia Perdana FC	9–0	21 July 2023	
92	Bismark Owusu^{4}	Ghana	Kasuka FC	Lun Bawang FC	11–0	30 July 2023	
93	Leon Sullivan Taylor^{6}	Liberia	Indera SC	Jerudong FC	10–0	6 August 2023	
94	Nor Hidayatullah Zaini^{5}	Brunei	IKLS-MB5 FC	Setia Perdana FC	7–1	11 August 2023	
95	Vouzon Junior	Ivory Coast	AKSE Bersatu	Setia Perdana FC	5–1	20 August 2023	
96	Nur Hidayat Abbas	Brunei	AKSE Bersatu	Jerudong FC	8–1	25 August 2023	
97	Vouzon Junior	Ivory Coast	AKSE Bersatu	Jerudong FC	8–1	25 August 2023	
98	Leon Sullivan Taylor^{4}	Liberia	Indera SC	BAKES FC	10–0	27 August 2023	
99	Nur Asyraffahmi Norsamri^{4}	Brunei	Kasuka FC	Panchor Murai FC	9–0	27 August 2023	
100	Leon Sullivan Taylor	Liberia	Kasuka FC	Lun Bawang FC	9–0	30 August 2024	
101	Adi Said	Brunei	Kasuka FC	Lun Bawang FC	9–0	30 August 2024	
102	Willian dos Santos^{4}	Brazil	Kasuka FC	Jerudong FC	10–0	21 September 2024	
103	Elias Mesquita	Timor-Leste	Indera SC	Lun Bawang FC	10–0	22 September 2024	
104	Babatunde Abiodun	Nigeria	Indera SC	Lun Bawang FC	10–0	22 September 2024	
105	Noorhisham Yakup	Brunei	BSRC FC	Jerudong FC	4–1	27 September 2024	
106	Abdul Azim Abdul Rasid^{4}	Brunei	MS PPDB	Wijaya FC	6–2	28 September 2024	
107	Nur Hazwan Khan Asmah Khan	Brunei	KB FC	Lun Bawang FC	4–2	29 September 2024	
108	Sergio Mendigutxia^{5}	Spain	DPMM FC II	AKSE Bersatu	6–1	19 October 2024	
109	Syafiq Abdullah Ghazali	Brunei	KB FC	Jerudong FC	4–1	20 October 2024	
110	Sergio Mendigutxia	Spain	DPMM FC II	BSRC FC	5–1	25 October 2024	
111	Hazmi Salleh	Brunei	Kota Ranger	Lun Bawang FC	4–0	25 October 2024	
112	Hariz Danial Khallidden	Brunei	MS ABDB	Panchor Murai FC	5–0	26 October 2024	
113	Sergio Mendigutxia^{5}	Spain	DPMM FC II	Lun Bawang FC	12–1	8 November 2024	
114	Sahfiq Hidayat Sahrizam^{4}	Brunei	AKSE Bersatu	BSRC FC	7–0	10 November 2024	
115	Zainul Ariffin Mahdinee	Brunei	AKSE Bersatu	BSRC FC	7–0	10 November 2024	
116	Hazmi Salleh	Brunei	Kota Ranger	AKSE Bersatu	3–2	23 November 2024	
117	Sergio Mendigutxia	Spain	DPMM FC II	Wijaya FC	7–0	24 November 2024	
118	Willian dos Santos^{5}	Brazil	Kasuka FC	AKSE Bersatu	9–1	29 November 2024	
119	Saifullah Saifuddin	Brunei	Rimba Star	Lun Bawang	8–2	1 December 2024	
120	Hazmi Salleh^{5}	Brunei	Kota Ranger	Jerudong FC	8–1	7 January 2025	
121	Leon Sullivan Taylor^{4}	Liberia	Kasuka FC	KB FC	9–0	10 January 2025	
122	Willian dos Santos	Brazil	Kasuka FC	KB FC	9–0	10 January 2025	
123	Sergio Mendigutxia	Spain	DPMM FC II	Panchor Murai	8–0	11 January 2025	
124	Willian dos Santos^{4}	Brazil	Kasuka FC	Rimba Star	11–0	17 January 2025	
125	Razimie Ramlli	Brunei	MS ABDB	Lun Bawang	8–0	19 January 2025	
126	Aman Abdul Rahim	Brunei	Wijaya FC	Panchor Murai	8–1	19 January 2025	
127	Willian dos Santos^{8}	Brazil	Kasuka FC	Panchor Murai	19–0	25 January 2025	
128	Takuya Tasaka	Japan	Kasuka FC	Panchor Murai	19–0	25 January 2025	
129	Adi Said	Brunei	Kasuka FC	Panchor Murai	19–0	25 January 2025	
130	Sergio Mendigutxia^{4}	Spain	DPMM FC II	Kota Ranger	6–1	28 January 2025	
131	Fazizzul Hussin	Brunei	MS PPDB	Lun Bawang	9–0	28 January 2025	
132	Elisha Kashim	Nigeria	Indera SC	Rimba Star	12–1	29 January 2025	
133	Babatunde Abiodun	Nigeria	Indera SC	Rimba Star	12–1	29 January 2025	
134	Willian dos Santos	Brazil	Kasuka FC	DPMM FC II	3–2	2 February 2025	
135	Pedro Alves	Brazil	Kasuka FC	Wijaya FC	7–1	20 September 2025	
136	Azizul Syafiee Tajul Ariffin^{4}	Brunei	Kuala Belait FC	Hawa FC	7–0	21 September 2025	
137	Pedro Alves^{4}	Brazil	Kasuka FC	Lun Bawang FC	10–0	26 September 2025	
138	Amin Sisa^{4}	Brunei	Indera SC	Hawa FC	14–0	28 September 2025	
139	Al-Kholil Sapawi	Brunei	Indera SC	Hawa FC	14–0	28 September 2025	
140	Hazmi Salleh^{4}	Brunei	Kota Ranger	Hawa FC	19–0	26 October 2025	
141	Muhammed Sa'ad	Nigeria	Kota Ranger	Hawa FC	19–0	26 October 2025	
142	Aidil Ezwandy Anak Akit	Brunei	MS PPDB	Hawa FC	5–0	2 November 2025	
143	Oscar Uchendu	Nigeria	Rimba Star	BSRC FC	7–0	21 November 2025	
144	Muhammed Sa'ad	Nigeria	Kota Ranger	Jerudong FC	5–2	22 November 2025	
145	Saufi Salleh^{4}	Brunei	MS ABDB	Hawa FC	10–1	30 November 2025	
146	Oscar Uchendu	Nigeria	Rimba Star	Wijaya FC	4–1	11 January 2026	
147	Willian dos Santos	Brazil	Kasuka FC	Hawa FC	26–1	18 January 2026	
148	Pedro Alves^{5}	Brazil	Kasuka FC	Hawa FC	26–1	18 January 2026	
149	Oscar Onyeka^{4}	Nigeria	Kasuka FC	Hawa FC	26–1	18 January 2026	
150	Haziq Naqiuddin Syamra^{5}	Brunei	Kasuka FC	Hawa FC	26–1	18 January 2026	
151	Leon Sullivan Taylor	Liberia	Indera SC	BSRC FC	6–1	23 January 2026	
152	Sahfiq Hidayat Sahrizam	Brunei	Kota Ranger	Wijaya FC	5–1	25 January 2026	
153	Oscar Uchendu	Nigeria	Rimba Star	MS PPDB	3–1	11 January 2026	
154	Oscar Uchendu	Nigeria	Rimba Star	MS ABDB	3–4	4 April 2026	
155	Leon Sullivan Taylor	Liberia	Indera SC	Kuala Belait FC	5–1	12 April 2026	
156	Oscar Uchendu^{4}	Nigeria	Rimba Star	Hawa FC	9–2	12 April 2026	
157	Syafiq Abdullah Elan	Brunei	Lun Bawang	Kota Ranger	3–6	12 April 2026	
158	Sahfiq Hidayat Sahrizam	Brunei	Kota Ranger	Lun Bawang	6–3	12 April 2026	
159	Sahfiq Hidayat Sahrizam	Brunei	Kota Ranger	MS PPDB	3–4	19 April 2026	
160	Jefferson Baiano	Brazil	DPMM II	Rimba Star	6–2	12 September 2026	
161	Oscar Uchendu^{5}	Nigeria	Rimba Star	Lun Bawang	7–3	25 September 2026	
162	Hafis Mahari	Brunei	Panchor Murai	MS PPDB	3–1	10 October 2026	
163	Oscar Uchendu^{5}	Nigeria	Rimba Star	Hawa	5–1	11 October 2026	
164	Jefferson Baiano	Brazil	DPMM II	Jerudong	9–1	25 October 2026	
165	Martins Ohia	Nigeria	Panchor Murai	Jerudong	6–1	1 November 2026	
166	Hafis Mahari^{4}	Brunei	Panchor Murai	BSRC FC	10–1	6 November 2026	
167	Joshua Akinola	Nigeria	Panchor Murai	BSRC FC	10–1	6 November 2026	
168	Jefferson Baiano	Brazil	DPMM II	Wijaya	5–2	8 November 2026	
169	Leon Sullivan Taylor^{5}	Liberia	Kasuka FC	BSRC FC	14–0	17 November 2026	
170	Abdul Azim Abdul Rasid^{4}	Brunei	DPMM II	Lun Bawang	12–0	20 November 2026	
171	Kauã Santana	Brazil	DPMM II	Lun Bawang	12–0	20 November 2026	
