= 2018–19 Brunei FA Cup =

Tournament details
- Country: Brunei
- Dates: 6 March 2019 – 22 April 2019
- Teams: 17

Final positions
- Champions: Kota Ranger FC (1st title)
- Runners-up: MS PDB

Tournament statistics
- Matches played: 15
- Goals scored: 60 (4 per match)
- Top goal scorer: Abdul Halim (5 goals)

The 2018–19 Brunei FA Cup is the 12th edition of the Brunei FA Cup, the knockout football tournament in Brunei.

== List of participating teams ==
from Brunei Super League

- IKLS
- Indera
- Kasuka
- Kota Ranger
- Lun Bawang
- MS ABDB
- MS PDB
- Najip
- Setia Perdana
- Wijaya

from District Leagues

- BSRC
- Jerudong
- Panchor Murai
- Rainbow
- Rimba Star
- Seri Wira
- Tabuan Muda

== Qualifying play-offs ==
25 January 2019
20:15 UTC+8

Panchor Murai	1 – 1	Tabuan Muda
Nur Hidayat 65'	Report	Hadif Aiman 5'
Penalties
Nurul Hadi (penalty scored); Sharil (penalty scored); Azharuddin (penalty scored); Nurul Al-Mustaqim (penalty scored)	4 – 3	(penalty scored) Azizie Hazmi; (penalty scored) Nursalikin Mustanir; (penalty scored) Azhar

Berakas Sports Complex, Berakas

25 January 2019
20:15 UTC+8

Rimba Star	2 – 5	Seri Wira
Adi Darwisy 15'; Hafiz 87'	Report	Ahmad Fahmi 12'; Suhaili 24', 56'; Hassan 41'; Darsoto Tjhia 79'

Track & Field Sports Complex, Berakas

27 January 2019
20:15 UTC+8

DPMM	4 – 0	Rainbow
Imam 12'; Hakeme Yazid 15', 23', 72'	Report

Jerudong Park Mini Stadium, Jerudong

27 January 2019
20:15 UTC+8

Jerudong	2 – 3	BSRC
Yansen 44'; Micky 75' (pen.)	Report	Melvin 9'; Iqmal Wafi 36'; Herman 43'

Berakas Sports Complex, Berakas

== Knockout stage ==
=== Round of 16 ===
6 March 2019
20:15 UTC+8

Tabuan Muda	2 – 4	BSRC
Aisan Aizuddin 79' (pen.), 90+1'	Report	Iqmal Wafi 37'; Abdul Halim 65', 75'; Nur Hazwan Khan 84'

Track & Field Sports Complex, Berakas

12 March 2019
20:15 UTC+8

DPMM	1 – 2	Kota Ranger
Hanif Farhan 15'	Report	Afi 48'; Esmendy 104'

Jerudong Park Mini Stadium, Jerudong

13 March 2019
20:15 UTC+8

ABDB	4 – 0	Jerudong
Suhaldy 9'; Adey Shariduan 40' (pen.); Hariz Danial 64', 78'	Report

Track & Field Sports Complex, Berakas

16 March 2019
20:15 UTC+8

Setia Perdana	2 – 1	Seri Wira
Azim 37'; Agus Heryono 49'	Report	Aidil Yusri 76'

Berakas Sports Complex, Berakas

20 March 2019
20:15 UTC+8

IKLS	4 – 2	Panchor Murai
Nuralifullah 47'; Nurhidayatullah 55', 90+1'; Razi 67'	Report	Nur Hidayat; Sahrul 84'

Track & Field Sports Complex, Berakas

29 March 2019
20:15 UTC+8

Wijaya	0 – 2	Kasuka
	Report	Maziri 25'; Afindi Yati 34' (pen.)

Berakas Sports Complex, Berakas

29 March 2019
20:15 UTC+8

Indera	7 – 0	Najip
Abdul Aziz 3'; Haikal 35'; Aminuddin Zakwan 44'; Amirul Hakeem 53'; Zulkhairy 53'; Hamizan Aziz 85'; Asri 90+1'	Report

Track & Field Sports Complex, Berakas

30 March 2019
20:15 UTC+8

PDB	9 – 0	Rimba Star
Asri 12'; Na'im 18', 30', 49'; Abdul Azim 24', 65'; Farish Aryan 47'; Nizamuddin 83'; Fazzizul 87'	Report

Track & Field Sports Complex, Berakas

=== Quarter-finals ===
5 April 2019
20:15 UTC+8

ABDB	0 – 1 (a.e.t.)	Indera
	Report	Asri 95'

Berakas Sports Complex, Berakas

5 April 2019
20:15 UTC+8

Kasuka	0 – 1 (a.e.t.)	Kota Ranger
	Report	Fawzan 118'

Track & Field Sports Complex, Berakas

6 April 2019
20:15 UTC+8

PDB	1 – 0 (a.e.t.)	IKLS
Zakeus 118'	Report

Berakas Sports Complex, Berakas

13 April 2019
20:15 UTC+8

BSRC	8 – 0	Setia Perdana
Abdul Halim 17', 31', 38'; Nurhazwan Khan 25'; Herman 65'; Aizuddin 76' (pen.); Junaidi 85'; Hafizul 90+1'	Report

Berakas Sports Complex, Berakas

=== Semi-finals ===
17 April 2019
20:15 UTC+8

Indera	1 – 2	PDB
Asri 5' (pen.)	Report	Abdul Azim 25', 36'

Track & Field Sports Complex, Berakas

19 April 2019
20:15 UTC+8

Kota Ranger	2 – 1 (a.e.t.)	BSRC
Abu Bakar 50'; Abdul Azim 93'	Report	Safuan 39'

Berakas Sports Complex, Berakas

=== Final ===
22 April 2019
20:15 UTC+8

Kota Ranger	2 – 1	PDB
Amalul 36'; Asyraffahmi 89'	Report	Amir 55'

Track & Field Sports Complex, Berakas

=== Bracket ===
Quarter-finals
Indera	1
ABDB	0
PDB	1
IKLS	0
Kota Ranger	1
Kasuka	0
BSRC	8
Setia Perdana	0

Semi-finals
PDB	2
Indera	1
Kota Ranger	2
BSRC	1

Final
Kota Ranger	2
PDB	1

== Top scorers ==
- Note: Goals for this competition do not count towards goalscoring records of the Brunei Super League, nor individual domestic league goal tallies

Pos	Player	Club	Goals
1	(Brunei) Abdul Halim Shawaludin	BSRC FC	5
2	(Brunei) Abdul Azim Abdul Rashid	MS PDB	4
3	(Brunei) Na'im Tarif	MS PDB	3
3	(Brunei) Hakeme Yazid Said	DPMM FC	3
4	(Brunei) Suhaili Matassan	Seri Wira FC	2
4	(Brunei) Aisan Aizuddin	Tabuan Muda	2
4	(Brunei) Iqmal Wafi	BSRC FC	2
4	(Brunei) Nurhidayatullah Zaini	IKLS FC	2
4	(Brunei) Hariz Danial Khallidden	MS ABDB	2
4	(Brunei) Nur Hazwan Khan	BSRC FC	2
4	(Brunei) Herman Hasnal	BSRC FC	2
4	(Brunei) Asri Aspar	Indera SC	2

== See also ==
- 2018–19 Brunei Super League
