= Haziq Naqiuddin Syamra =

Bruneian footballer (born 2004)

Haziq Naqiuddin
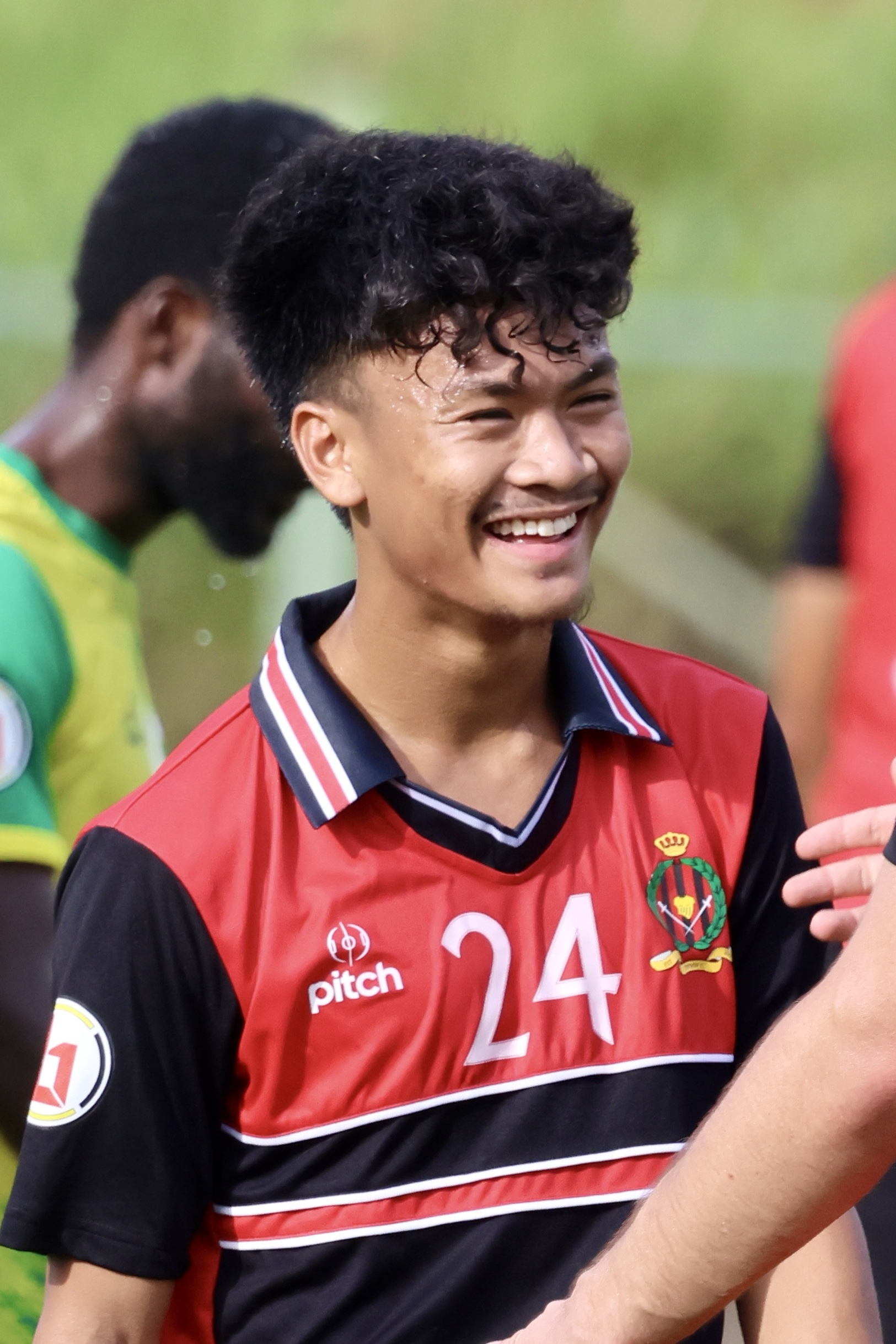

Personal information
- Full name: Muhammad Haziq Naqiuddin bin Syamra
- Date of birth: 26 May 2004 (age 22)
- Place of birth: Brunei
- Height: 1.63 m (5 ft 4 in)
- Position: Winger

Team information
- Current team: DPMM FC II
- Number: 19

Youth career
- 2020: DPMM
- 2021: IKLS-MB5

Senior career*
Years	Team	Apps	(Gls)
2022	IKLS-MB5	0	(0)
2023	Kota Ranger	15	(4)
2024	DPMM	0	(0)
2025	DPMM II	4	(1)
2025–2026	Kasuka	10	(11)
2026–	DPMM II	4	(1)

International career^{‡}
2022	Brunei U19	3	(0)
2023–	Brunei U23	13	(1)
2024–	Brunei	10	(1)
- * Club domestic league appearances and goals as of 3 November 2026 ‡ National team caps and goals as of 19 November 2026

Muhammad Haziq Naqiuddin bin Syamra (born 26 May 2004) is a Bruneian footballer who plays for Brunei Super League side DPMM II and also the Brunei national team as a winger.

== Club career ==
=== IKLS-MB5 ===
Haziq was formerly a trainee in the youth setup of DPMM FC. He moved to IKLS-MB5 FC in 2021, and made his debut in the first fixture for his team at the 2022 Brunei FA Cup against Nelayan FT where he duly opened the scoring in the 39th minute. IKLS-MB5 advanced to the knockout stage of the tournament where they were beaten 9–3 on aggregate against Indera SC, with Haziq grabbing a consolation goal in the second leg.

=== Kota Ranger ===
Haziq transferred to Kota Ranger at the start of the 2023 Brunei Super League. He scored his first goal for the Rangers against his former club IKLS-MB5 in his second appearance in a 1–1 draw on 12 March. His team made stellar performances all season, with their only defeat coming in the tenth minute of stoppage time by Kasuka FC midfielder Aoi Isami in a 3–4 loss on 24 May, having led the game 3–2 towards the end of 90 minutes. By November at the premature end of the season, Kota Ranger finished in an impressive third place, while Haziq was awarded the Best Under-21 Player of the league.

=== DPMM ===
In early 2024, Haziq attended local trials for DPMM FC who were going to compete in the 2024–25 Singapore Premier League and impressed Rui Capela enough to include him in the 25-man first team. His stint was limited to appearances on the substitutes' bench, and by the end of 2024, having failed to make an appearance in the Singapore Premier League he transferred to the second team playing in the domestic league. He was utilised by Helme Panjang in the remaining four games of the 2024–25 Brunei Super League, including the final match on 2 February against Kasuka FC which served as the championship decider, and the 2023 champions successfully defended their title with a 2–3 win.

In the 2025 Brunei FA Cup, Haziq shone for DPMM II scoring three goals including one against league winners Kasuka in the second leg of the semi-final. On 18 May, he earned his first winner's medal after his team beat Indera SC via a single goal in the final of the competition.

=== Kasuka ===
After DPMM withdrew their second team from the 2025–26 Brunei Super League, Haziq transferred to local powerhouses Kasuka FC. He made his debut in their league opener, a 1–7 victory against Wijaya FC on 20 September 2025 as a late substitute. He opened his scoring account for Kasuka with a brace in a 10–0 win over Lun Bawang FC six days later.

In a league match against Hawa FC on 18 January 2026, Haziq managed to score five goals and contributed to the highest-scoring match in Brunei Super League history, the final score being 26–1. He altogether scored eleven goals for the season, missing out on a championship medal on the final day as his club were beaten 3–2 by Indera SC for the BSL title.

=== Return to DPMM II ===
At the start of the 2026–27 Brunei Super League, Haziq turned out for a reformed DPMM II, now under head coach Subhi Bakir, and scored the opener in his first outing against Rimba Star on 12 September.

== International career ==
=== Youth ===
Haziq was selected for the Brunei under-19s playing at the July 2022 AFF U-19 Youth Championship in Indonesia, appearing as a substitute in the final two group games against Thailand and Philippines. Two months later, he boarded a plane with the same Young Wasps age group to Kyrgyzstan where the 2023 AFC U-20 Asian Cup qualification group for Brunei was hosted. He only played one single minute in Bishkek, as a late substitute against UAE in a 5–0 loss.

The following year, Haziq was integrated to the under-23s competing at the August 2023 AFF U-23 Championship in Thailand and also the 2024 AFC U-23 Asian Cup qualifying group matches taking place in Jordan the month after. He was involved in every match for Brunei U23, making seven appearances.

In July 2025, Haziq was selected for the 2025 ASEAN U-23 Championship hosted by Indonesia. He started the first game on 15 July against the hosts in a 8–0 defeat. In the next fixture against Malaysia, Haziq managed to score the consolation goal for the Young Wasps in a 1–7 loss. He was a second-half substitute in Brunei's final game against the Philippines which finished 2–0 to the Young Azkals.

In September 2025, Haziq joined up with the under-23s again for the 2026 AFC U-23 Asian Cup qualification held in Qatar, starting in all three matches for the Young Wasps.

=== Senior ===
Haziq was first selected for the senior national team in February 2024 and made his unofficial debut as a substitute against Brunei Super League All-Star in a friendly match on 26 February. A month later, he joined the Wasps at the 2024 FIFA Series held in Saudi Arabia but did not see game time. Later that June, Haziq was also a squad member of the Brunei team that played two friendlies against Sri Lanka under Rui Capela.

It was not until exactly a year later when Haziq was recalled to the national team under Fabio Maciel after a stellar club campaign with DPMM II, gearing up for the 2027 AFC Asian Cup qualifying home fixture against Bhutan. He made his full international debut as a substitute in a 1–0 defeat to Sri Lanka on 5 June away in Thailand. Five days later, he made the starting lineup against Bhutan and prevailed in a 2–1 victory at the Hassanal Bolkiah National Stadium. In the next qualifying fixture against Yemen on 9 October, Haziq kept his place in the Wasps' starting lineup but only played the first half in a 0–2 defeat. Five days later, he came on in the second half for the second Yemen game held in Kuwait, which ended in a painful 9–0 loss for the Wasps.

In March 2026, Haziq was selected for the national team traveling to India for the away game against Bhutan to close out the Asian Cup qualifying campaign. He was brought on in the second half as Brunei tasted their fifth defeat of the campaign, the match ending 2–1 to the designated home team. In June of the same year, Haziq made the 23-man Brunei squad to compete for a place at the 2026 ASEAN Championship, playing the qualifying round with Timor-Leste. He made one substitute appearance in the second leg which was a 1–3 defeat at the Kuala Lumpur Stadium.

Haziq was selected for the Brunei side at the 2026 FIFA ASEAN Cup played in Hong Kong. In the first match on 24 September, Haziq latched onto an outside foot through pass by captain Azwan Ali Rahman to score Brunei's goal in a 1–3 defeat. He also made the starting eleven in the second match against Hong Kong in a 0–2 loss. Two months later at the 2026 King's Cup, Haziq made two appearances in central midfield against hosts Thailand as well as Oman, both ending in heavy losses for the Wasps.

=== International goals ===
Scores and results list Brunei' goal tally first.

No	Date	Venue	Opponent	Score	Result	Competition
1.	24 September 2026	Mong Kok Stadium, Kowloon, Hong Kong	Laos	1–2	1–3	2026 FIFA ASEAN Cup

== Honours ==
DPMM II

- Brunei Super League: 2024–25 (runners-up)
- Brunei FA Cup: 2025

Kasuka

- Brunei Super League: 2025–26 (runners-up)

=== Individual ===
- 2023 Brunei Super League Best Under-21 Player

== Personal life ==
His father, Syamra Zaini, is a former footballer in the Brunei leagues and played for Jerudong FC and BESA FC among others.
