= 2026–27 Brunei Super League =

Current top-flight association football league in Brunei

Brunei Super League
- Season: 2026–27
- Matches: 38
- Goals: 188 (4.95 per match)
- Top goalscorer: Kauã Santana (12 goals)
- Biggest home win: Kasuka 14–0 BSRC (17 November 2026)
- Biggest away win: BSRC 1–10 Panchor Murai (6 November 2026)
- Highest scoring: Kasuka 14–0 BSRC (17 November 2026)

The 2026–27 Brunei Super League is the twelfth season of the Brunei Super League, the top football league in Brunei since its establishment in 2012. The league was scheduled to begin on 5 September 2026 and to be played until May 2027. The commencement of the new season was delayed by the 2026 Southeast Asian haze, forcing it to start a week later.

== Teams ==
13 teams are competing in the league for the 2026–27 season. DPMM FC entered their second team once again, while Panchor Murai FC also returned after a hiatus. Kota Ranger FC however withdrew their participation for unspecified reasons.

Club	Head coach	Captain	Kit manufacturer	Shirt sponsor
BSRC FC	(Brunei) Saharin Masri	(Brunei) Aizuddin Abdul Rahman	(Brunei) Sports Alliance (Thailand) Warrix	
DPMM FC II	(Brunei) Subhi Abdilah Bakir	(Brunei) Abdul Muntaqim	(Germany) Puma	Hertz
Hawa FC	(Brunei) Khairul Hasmi Ali	(Brunei) Ghazi Ismawi	(Malaysia) Lakoh Sport (Thailand) Lugust	
Indera SC	(Brunei) Edwin Mat Noor	(Brunei) Abdul Khair Basri	(Myanmar) Hyve	Hyve
Jerudong FC	(Brunei) Abdul Aziz Lamudin	(Brunei) Khairol Nazrin Zamhari	(Indonesia) Ereight	
Kasuka FC	(Brunei) Halimi Abu Bakar	(Brunei) Afi Aminuddin	(Brunei) Nueve	
KB FC	(Brunei) Kambri Rambli	(Brunei) Azizul Syafiee Tajul Ariffin	(Malaysia) Kaki Jersi	Active Tank
Lun Bawang FC	(Brunei) Darus Tanjong	(Brunei) Zulfadhli Asli	(Germany) Adidas (Thailand) Pegan Sport	Visit Temburong
Panchor Murai FC	(Brunei) Hanafizal Helmi Hanafiah	(Brunei) Azim Izamuddin Suhaimi	(Malaysia) Panzer (Thailand) Hunter	HiTUNE
MS ABDB	(Brunei) Yusof Matyassin	(Brunei) Saiful Ammar Adis	(Brunei) Nueve	
MS PPDB	(Brunei) Edy Asmady Abdul Malik	(Brunei) Fazizzul Hussin	(Brunei) Nueve	
Rimba Star FC	(Brunei) Sallehuddin Sarifudin	(Brunei) Nur Azees Ali	(Malaysia) SV Sport	
Wijaya FC	(Brunei) Muhaimin Mohamad	(Brunei) Jamrin Johari	(Thailand) Cadenza	

== League table ==
Pos	Team	Pld	W	D	L	GF	GA	GD	Pts	
1	DPMM II	6	6	0	0	42	7	+35	18	Qualification for the AFC Challenge League qualifying play-offs and 2025–26 ASEAN Club Championship qualifying play-offs
2	Panchor Murai	7	6	0	1	31	7	+24	18	
3	Kasuka	5	5	0	0	32	1	+31	15	
4	Kuala Belait	6	3	0	3	12	15	−3	9	
5	Wijaya	7	3	0	4	12	18	−6	9	
6	Jerudong	6	3	0	3	9	19	−10	9	
7	Indera	4	2	1	1	6	2	+4	7	
8	MS ABDB	6	2	1	3	8	11	−3	7	
9	MS PPDB	4	2	0	2	5	5	0	6	
10	Rimba Star	8	2	0	6	15	30	−15	6	
11	Lun Bawang	7	2	0	5	11	29	−18	6	
12	BSRC	6	2	0	4	8	30	−22	6	
13	Hawa	6	0	0	6	4	21	−17	0	

Updated to match(es) played on 22 November 2026. Source: FABD
Rules for classification: 1) Points; 2) Goal difference; 3) Goals scored; 4) Head-to-head result; 5) Head-to-head goal difference; 6) Head-to-head goals scored.

=== Position by round ===
Team ╲ Round	1	2	3	4	5	6	7	8	9	10	11	12	13	14	15	16	17	18	19	20	21	22	23	24
DPMM II	-	1	2	3	1	1	1	1																
Panchor Murai	-	8	5	7	2	2	2	2																
Kasuka	-	7	7	8	9	7	3	3																
Kuala Belait	-	2	1	1	3	4	5	4																
Wijaya	-	9	10	10	6	3	4	5																
Jerudong	-	4	4	2	4	5	6	6																
Indera	-	3	6	5	7	6	7	7																
MS ABDB	-	5	9	6	8	9	11	8																
MS PPDB	-	11	11	12	12	10	8	9																
Rimba Star	-	12	3	4	5	8	10	10																
Lun Bawang	-	10	12	11	11	12	9	11																
BSRC	-	6	8	9	10	11	12	12																
Hawa	-	13	13	13	13	13	13	13																

Table Leader

Source: FABD

== Results ==
Home \ Away	BSR	DPM	HAW	IND	JER	KAS	KBF	LUN	MSA	MSP	PAN	RIM	WIJ
BSRC			3–1								1–10		2–1
DPMM II							6–0	12–0	4–2				
Hawa					1–3							1–5	0–3
Indera						0–1			1–1				
Jerudong	2–1	1–9						2–1					
Kasuka	14–0											10–0	
Kuala Belait			5–1			1–5					1–2		2–1
Lun Bawang	2–1		2–0				0–3						
MS ABDB						0–2					2–1	3–0	
MS PPDB				2–0					3–0				
Panchor Murai					6–1					3–1		3–1	6–0
Rimba Star		2–6		0–3				7–3		0–1			
Wijaya		2–5			1–0			4–3					

Updated to match(es) played on 21 November 2026. Source: Liga Brunei
Legend: Blue = home team win; Yellow = draw; Red = away team win.
For upcoming matches, an "a" indicates there is an article about the rivalry between the two participants.

=== Results by round ===
Team ╲ Round	1	2	3	4	5	6	7	8	9	10	11	12	13	14	15	16	17	18	19	20	21	22	23	24	25	26	27
BSRC	L	W	-	L	W		L		L																		
DPMM II		W	W	W	W		W	W																			
Hawa		L	L	L	L	L	L	-																			
Indera	-	W	L	D	W																						
Jerudong	W	W	L	W	L	L																					
Kasuka		-	W		W	W	W		W																		
Kuala Belait	W	W	W	L	L		L																				
Lun Bawang	L	L	L	W	L	-	W	L																			
MS ABDB		W	L	D	L	L	-	W																			
MS PPDB		L	L		-	W	W																				
Panchor Murai		L	W	W	W	W	W	W																			
Rimba Star	W	L	W	L	L	L	L	L	-																		
Wijaya	L	L	W	-	W	W	L	L																			

Updated to match(es) played on 22 November 2026. Source: Liga Brunei

== Top scorers ==
As of 21 November 2026

Rank	Player	Team	Goals
1	(Brazil) Kauã Santana	DPMM II	12
2	(Brazil) Jefferson Baiano	DPMM II	11
3	(Nigeria) Oscar Uchendu	Rimba Star	10
4	(Brunei) Hafis Mahari	Panchor Murai	8
4	(Nigeria) Martins Ohia	Panchor Murai	8
6	(Liberia) Leon Sullivan Taylor	Kasuka	7
7	(Brunei) Abdul Azim Abdul Rasid	DPMM II	5
7	(Brunei) Asri Aspar	Kasuka	5
7	(Nigeria) Joshua Akinola	Panchor Murai	5
10	(Brunei) Aaiman Muqmin Baharuddin	Rimba Star	4
10	(Brazil) Jordan Kaique	Kasuka	4
