= 2018–19 Brunei Super League =

Brunei Super League
- Season: 2018–19
- Champions: MS ABDB
- Relegated: IKLS FC, Najip FC
- Matches: 90
- Goals: 359 (3.99 per match)
- Top goalscorer: Hanif Aiman Adanan (16)

The 2018–19 Brunei Super League is the 6th season of the Brunei Super League, the top Bruneian professional league for association football clubs, since its establishment in 2012. The season began on 26 October 2018.

== Champions ==
Team	Location	Stadium	Capacity
Royal Brunei Armed Forces Sports Council	Bandar Seri Begawan	Stadium Padang dan Balapan	3,000

== Teams ==
A total of 10 teams competed in the league. MS ABDB were the defending champions. Menglait and Jerudong were relegated from last season, and were replaced by promoted teams Setia Perdana and IKLS. Tabuan Muda, the youth team ran by the National Football Association of Brunei Darussalam, entered the Premier League instead of the Super League for this season.

- IKLS
- Indera
- Kasuka
- Kota Ranger
- Lun Bawang
- MS ABDB
- MS PDB
- Najip
- Setia Perdana
- Wijaya

== League table ==
Pos	Team	Pld	W	D	L	GF	GA	GD	Pts	Qualification or relegation
1	MS ABDB (C)	18	15	1	2	40	13	+27	46	
2	Kasuka (Q)	18	11	4	3	58	16	+42	37	~~Qualification for 2021 AFC Cup play-off round~~ (Note: Kasuka qualified for the 2021 AFC Cup play-off round as they were granted an AFC license in December 2020 and that the 2020 Brunei Super League was cancelled, so AFC selected the team with an AFC license that finished the previous season the highest. Ultimately, the ASEAN Zone which included Kasuka was cancelled.)
3	Wijaya	18	11	4	3	45	24	+21	37	
4	Indera (Q)	18	10	5	3	49	24	+25	35	Qualification for 2020 AFC Cup play-off round (Note: Indera qualified for the 2020 AFC Cup play-off round as they were the only team which had an AFC Cup license at the start of the 2020 AFC Cup.)
5	Kota Ranger	18	11	2	5	50	30	+20	35	
6	MS PDB	18	7	4	7	33	30	+3	25	
7	Lun Bawang	18	5	2	11	23	43	−20	17	
8	Setia Perdana	18	3	1	14	26	56	−30	10	
9	IKLS	18	3	1	14	18	50	−32	10	
10	Najip	18	2	0	16	15	71	−56	6	

Source: NFABD
Rules for classification: 1) Points; 2) Goal difference; 3) Goals scored.
(C) Champions; (Q) Qualified for the phase indicated

== See also ==
- 2018–19 Brunei FA Cup
