= Rosanan Samak =

Bruneian footballer and coach

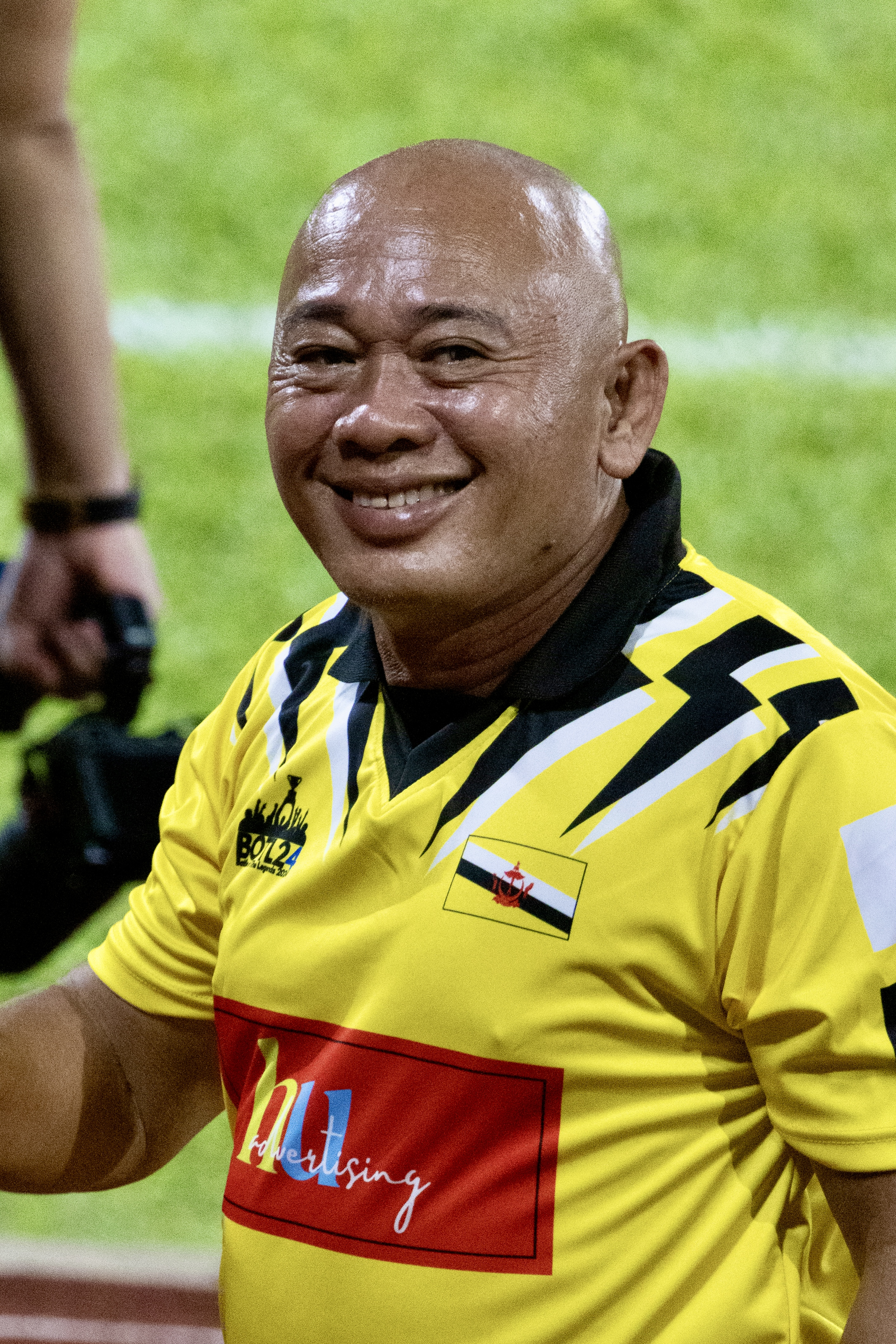
- Rosanan in 2024

Personal information
- Full name: Haji Mohammad Rosanan bin Abdullah Samak
- Date of birth: 18 July 1965 (age 61)
- Place of birth: Brunei
- Position: Striker

Senior career*
| Years | Team | Apps | (Gls) |
| 1985–2002 | Kota Ranger | | |
| 1985–2000 | Brunei FA | | (17+) |
| 2008 | Dragonfly FC | | |

International career
| | Brunei | 9+ | (1+) |

Managerial career
- 2001–2003: Kota Ranger
- 2004–2009: AH United
- 2009–2011: Brunei Youth Team
- 2010: Brunei U18 (assistant coach)
- 2011–2012: Brunei U21 (assistant coach)
- 2012: Brunei U21
- 2013: Brunei U15 (assistant coach)
- 2014: Brunei U21 (assistant coach)
- 2021: Panchor Murai
- 2022: Brunei
- 2023: AKSE Bersatu
- 2024: Brunei (assistant coach)
- 2025: Gergasi
- * Club domestic league appearances and goals

Haji Mohammad Rosanan bin Abdullah Samak (born 18 July 1965) is a Bruneian football coach and former player, who played as a striker most notably with the Brunei team that played in the Malaysian league in the 1990s. He was a member of the team that won the 1999 Malaysia Cup, which is regarded as Brunei football's crowning achievement.

== Club and coaching career ==
Rosanan started his career with the Bruneian team Kota Ranger FC, the team won the domestic championship in 1987 and participated in that year's Asian Champions' Cup (an early edition of the AFC Champions League). Kota Ranger also won the BAFA-Standard Chartered Football League in 1992 and Rosanan was the top scorer. At the turn of the decade, he was selected to play for the Brunei team competing in Liga Semi-Pro Malaysia. His 10-year career with the Wasps culminated in the shock 2–1 win against Sarawak in the final of the 1999 Malaysia Cup. This achievement was chronicled in FIFA 192: The True Story Behind the Legend of Brunei Darussalam National Football Team, a book by British author Stanley Park.

Rosanan left the national representative side in 2000. He returned to Kota Ranger as player-coach a year later, and was also given opportunities to coach Bruneian exhibition sides at the time. He hung up his boots in 2003 and moved to AH United a year later, starting a six-year tenure in which he won the Brunei FA Cup in 2006.

Hired by BAFA as a coach in 2009, Rosanan was assigned various coaching positions since, such as the Brunei Youth Team that played in the domestic league (2009–2011), the Under-21s (2012), and the Under-15s as assistant coach (2013). He was assistant to Kwon Oh-son for the Hassanal Bolkiah Trophy competitions for the U21s in 2012 and 2014. He received the Order of Setia Negara Brunei Fourth Class for his part in winning the competition in 2012.

In the 2021 Brunei Super League season, he coached Panchor Murai FC.

Between March and September 2022, he was the head coach of the Brunei national football team, taking charge of friendlies against Laos and Malaysia. The following year, he was appointed as head coach of AKSE Bersatu.

In May 2025, Rosanan was unveiled as the head coach of newly-established club Gergasi FC that participated in the 2025 Lela Cheteria League.

== International career ==
Rosanan scored a goal against Thailand national football team in a 5–2 defeat at the 17th SEA Games in Singapore on 11 June 1993.

Rosanan played for Brunei's national team at the 1999 SEA Games held at home, and played all six matches at the 2002 World Cup qualifying campaign without scoring a goal.

== Honours ==
=== As player ===
==== Team ====
Kota Ranger

- Brunei National Championship: 1987
- Jasra Trophy League: 1988-89
- BAFA-Standard Chartered Football League: 1992
- Borneo Inter-Club Cup: 1992

==== Individual ====
- BAFA-Standard Chartered Football League top scorer: 15 goals

=== As coach ===
==== Team ====
AH United

- Brunei FA Cup: 2006

Brunei national under-21 football team

- Hassanal Bolkiah Trophy: 2012 (as assistant coach)

==== Individual ====
- Meritorious Service Medal (PJK; 13 December 1999)
- Order of Setia Negara Brunei Fourth Class (PSB; 2012)
- IFFHS Brunei All Time Dream Team: 2021
