= Samuel Kojo Abbey =

Ghanaian association football player

Samuel Abbey
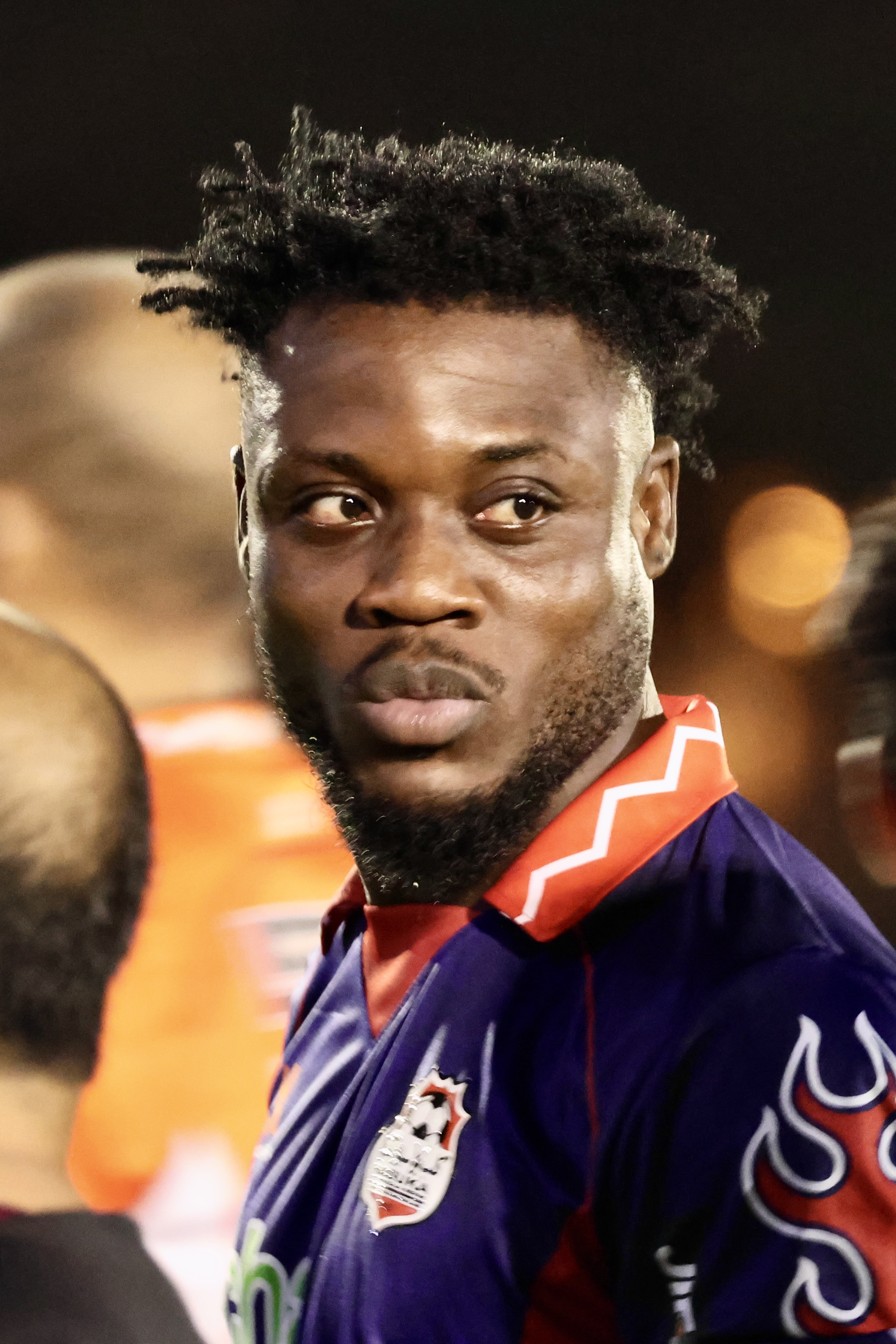
- Abbey with Kasuka in 2024

Personal information
- Full name: Samuel Kojo Abbey
- Date of birth: 31 August 1997 (age 29)
- Place of birth: Accra, Ghana
- Position: Center-back

Team information
- Current team: Kasuka FC
- Number: 4

Youth career
- 2005–2009: Nananom FC
- 2009–2010: Mystical Royals FC
- 2010–2012: Mercury Stars
- 2013–2014: Okwahu United

Senior career*
Years	Team	Apps	(Gls)
2015	Kitengela Shooters	21	(5)
2015–2016	JMC Hippos	12	(4)
2017–2018	Mawyawadi		
2019	Dagon	11	(0)
2021–2025	Kasuka	31	(5)
2026–	Kasuka	5	(2)
- * Club domestic league appearances and goals as of 18 November 2026

Samuel Kojo Abbey (born 31 August 1997) is a Ghanaian professional footballer who plays as a centre-back for Brunei Super League club Kasuka FC. He has played for teams in Ghana, Kenya, Uganda, Myanmar and Brunei.

== Career ==
Abbey was playing in the lower divisions of Ghana's football pyramid when he first moved abroad to Kitengela Shooters in Kenya. He then transferred to JMC Hippos who were playing in the 2015–16 Uganda Super League. He next moved to Mawyawadi FC of the MNL-2, Myanmar's second-tier club competition, in 2017. He stayed there until 2019 when he joined Dagon FC who were promoted to the 2019 Myanmar National League, and played 11 games for the Yangon side until they suffered relegation on the final day of the season.

In 2021, Abbey signed for Kasuka FC of the Brunei Super League. He scored a hat-trick in his debut in a 1–11 win against Panchor Murai FC on 20 June, becoming the first foreigner to score a hat-trick in the Brunei Super League.

Abbey stayed with Kasuka the following year and picked up a runners-up medal at the 2022 Brunei FA Cup, beaten by DPMM FC in the final on 4 December of that year.

Abbey's team went 16 games undefeated in the 2023 Brunei Super League, bringing him his first championship medal. In the following 2024–25 season, Kasuka was also unbeaten in 13 games and Abbey picked himself a second consecutive league championship medal.

After being unattached for a year, Abbey returned to Kasuka for the 2026–27 season, whereby the club was to compete in the qualification stages of the 2026–27 ASEAN Club Championship and the 2026–27 AFC Challenge League. Although Kasuka were eliminated by Manila Digger, they managed to qualify for the AFC third-tier competition, courtesy of Abbey's winning goal against Karketu Dili in the qualifier on 15 September.

== Honours ==
Kasuka FC

- Brunei Super League (2): 2023, 2024–25
