= Hariz Danial Khallidden =

Bruneian footballer (born 1996)

Hariz Danial
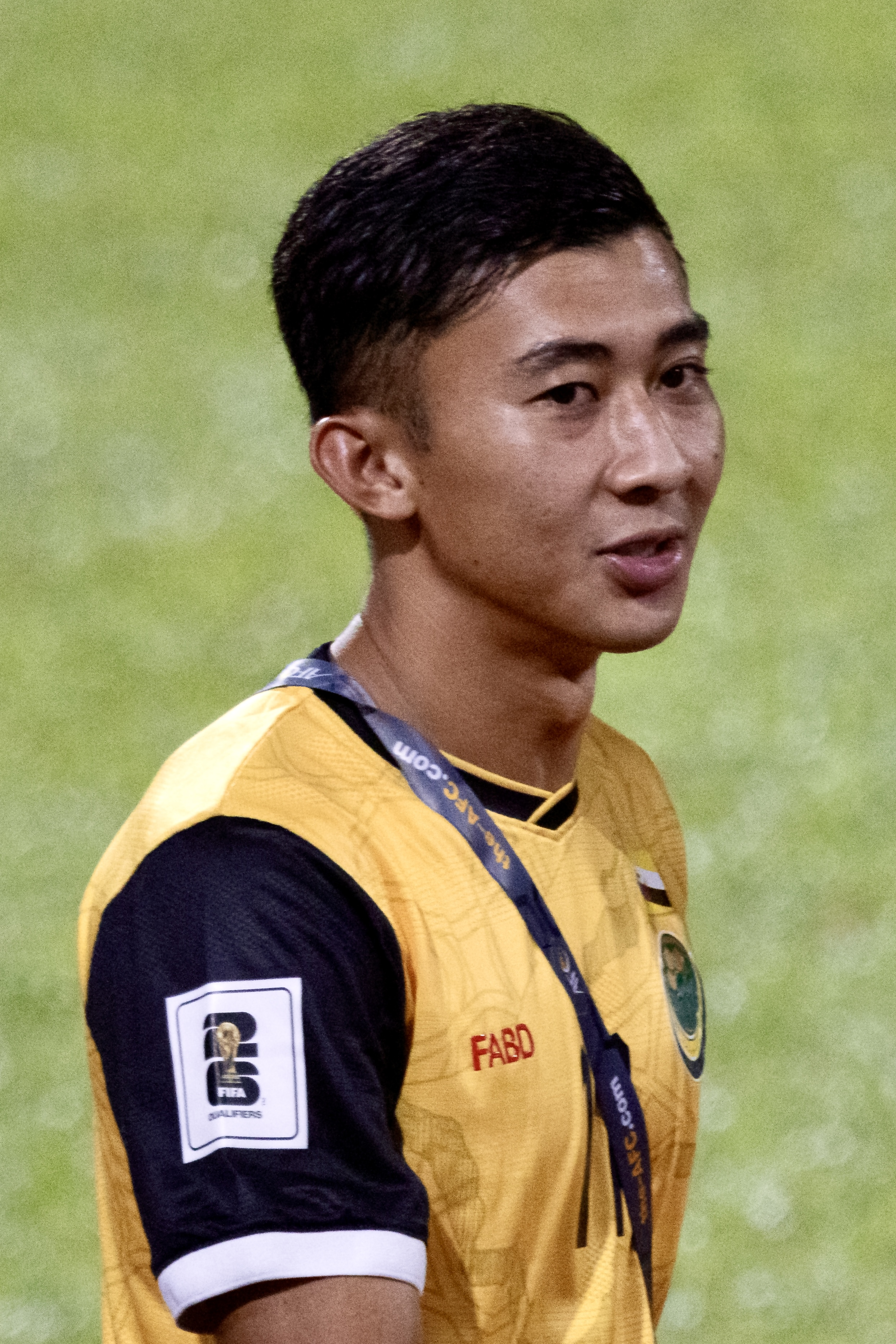
- Hariz with Brunei in 2023

Personal information
- Full name: Muhammad Hariz Danial bin Awang Haji Khallidden
- Date of birth: 1 November 1996 (age 30)
- Place of birth: Brunei Darussalam
- Height: 1.72 m (5 ft 8 in)
- Position: Striker

Team information
- Current team: MS ABDB
- Number: 24

Senior career*
Years	Team	Apps	(Gls)
2019–2024	MS ABDB	35	(23)
2025–2026	DPMM	14	(0)
2026–	MS ABDB	4	(0)

International career^{‡}
2019–	Brunei	21	(0)
- * Club domestic league appearances and goals as of 3 November 2026 ‡ National team caps and goals as of 16 November 2026

Lance Corporal Muhammad Hariz Danial bin Awang Haji Khallidden (born 1 November 1996) is a Bruneian footballer who plays for MS ABDB and the Brunei national team as a striker.

== Club career ==
=== MS ABDB ===
A career soldier for the Royal Brunei Armed Forces, Hariz started playing for the army's football team MS ABDB FT in the second half of the 2018–19 Brunei Super League. He made his league debut on 4 January 2019 in a 4–1 victory over Najip FC, scoring in the 80th minute. He contributed five goals in nine appearances in his half-season, including winning goals against title rivals Indera SC as well as Kasuka FC, helping the armymen to win the league championship for the fourth consecutive time.

After the discontinued 2020 season due to the COVID-19 pandemic, Hariz led the line for a transitioning MS ABDB FT side in 2021 and scored five goals in as many games, acquiring his first career hat-trick against BAKES FC in a 4–1 victory on 11 July. The league was again abandoned due to the detection of COVID-19 infections inside the country, ending an over 450-day record where Brunei had zero local COVID-19 transmissions stretching from June 2020.

The next year, Hariz and the armymen participated in the 2022 Brunei FA Cup and went all the way to the semi-finals, where they were eliminated 1–3 on aggregate by Kasuka FC.

=== DPMM FC ===
In December 2024, he transferred to DPMM FC which played in the Singapore Premier League. He made his DPMM debut on 13 January 2025 at home against Lion City Sailors as a second-half substitute in a 2–4 loss.

At the end of the 2025–26 season, Hariz was deemed surplus to requirements at DPMM and was released from his contract.

== International career ==
Hariz received his first callup to the national team for the 2022 World Cup qualification matches against Mongolia in July 2019, alongside nine other uncapped players. He played for Brunei in an exhibition match against the BSL All-Stars on 30 March 2021, which ended in a 1–1 draw. He made his unofficial debut for the Wasps in a 1–3 defeat to Sabah FC at the Track & Field Sports Complex on 6 September 2023. His first international cap came five days later in a 10–0 defeat away to Hong Kong, as a second-half substitute.

In October 2023, Hariz received a call-up for the national team at the 2026 World Cup qualification matches against Indonesia in a two-legged affair. He featured from the start in the first leg at left midfield, directly against Saddil Ramdani and Asnawi Mangkualam and performed admirably, but in the end the Wasps succumbed to a 6–0 defeat. Five days later in the return leg at Hassanal Bolkiah National Stadium, Hariz only played for half-an-hour as a substitute for Abdul Azizi Ali Rahman where the Garuda ran out winners by repeating the same score from the previous clash.

Hariz made five appearances in as many friendly games for Brunei in 2024, mostly as a substitute, as the Wasps recorded three wins against Vanuatu at the 2024 FIFA Series in March and also Sri Lanka which they played twice in June. The following September, he was elected by interim Brunei head coach Jamie McAllister as a starter in both games against Macau at the play-offs for the third round of the 2027 AFC Asian Cup qualification. Hariz aided the Wasps to a 4–0 aggregate victory to advance Brunei to the next phase of the competition. A month later however, Hariz was unable to replicate his recent form in both legs of the 2024 ASEAN Championship qualification, losing to Timor-Leste 0–1 on aggregate. He lastly featured in a final friendly game in 2024 was against Russia national football team where the Wasps were beaten 11–0.

Hariz was selected for the 2027 AFC Asian Cup qualifying first group fixture against Lebanon in March 2025. He came on as a second-half substitute in a 5–0 loss. He was selected for the Wasps' June 2025 fixtures against Sri Lanka and Bhutan, where he was played from the start in both games. A 2–1 victory at home against Bhutan on the 10th gave Brunei three precious points in their AFC Asian Cup qualification group. Having missed the fixtures in the rest of 2025 due to injury, Hariz was selected for the team for the away fixture against Bhutan that was held in India on 31 March 2026. Hariz started the match as Brunei were defeated 2–1 in the closing match of their Asian Cup qualification campaign.

Despite barely featuring for DPMM in the 2025–26 season, Hariz became the starting frontman for the Wasps at the June 2026 ASEAN Championship qualification matches against Timor-Leste, which ended in a 1–6 aggregate defeat. The following September, he was included in the Brunei squad for the 2026 FIFA ASEAN Cup to play against Laos and hosts Hong Kong. In the first game on the 24th, he committed a foul inside the box in the first minute for Laos' first goal via a penalty, the game ended 1–3 to Laos. Six days later against Hong Kong, Hariz entered the game as a late substitute in a 0–2 loss.

== Career statistics ==
As of 3 November 2026

=== Overview ===
club	season	league			cup		other		total	
club	season	division	apps	goals	apps	goals	apps	goals	apps	goals
MS ABDB	18–19	Brunei Super League	9	5	2	2	0	0	11	7
MS ABDB	2020	Brunei Super League	1	0	—		1 (Note: Appearance(s) in Brunei Super Cup)	0	2	0
MS ABDB	2021	Brunei Super League	5	5	—		0	0	5	5
MS ABDB	2022	Brunei Super League	—		7	2	0	0	7	2
MS ABDB	2023	Brunei Super League	14	8	—		0	0	14	8
MS ABDB	24–25	Brunei Super League	6	5	0	0	0	0	6	5
MS ABDB	MS ABDB total		35	23	9	4	1	0	45	27
DPMM	24–25	Singapore Premier League	11	0	5	0	0	0	16	0
DPMM	25–26	Malaysia Super League	3	0	0	0	0	0	3	0
DPMM	DPMM total		14	0	5	0	0	0	19	0
MS ABDB	26–27	Brunei Super League	4	0	0	0	0	0	4	0
career total			53	23	14	4	1	0	68	27

== Personal life ==
Hariz's younger brother Martin Haddy is a defender who plays for DPMM FC and also the national team.
