= Abu Bakar Mahari =

Bruneian footballer

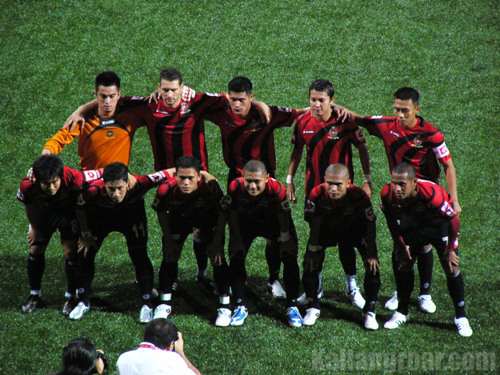
- Abu Bakar (bottom, second from right) during the 2009 Singapore League Cup

Personal information
- Full name: Muhammad Abu Bakar bin Mahari
- Date of birth: February 11, 1985 (age 41)
- Place of birth: Brunei Darussalam
- Height: 1.64 m (5 ft 4 1/2 in)
- Positions: Midfielder; striker

Team information
- Current team: PKT FT
- Number: 7

Senior career*
Years	Team	Apps	(Gls)
2007	KKSJ Penjara		
2007–2008	NBT FC		
2009–2012	DPMM	24	(3)
2010–2011	→ KKSJ Penjara (loan)		
2012–2013	Jerudong FC		(6)
2014	QAF FC		(2)
2015	Kasuka FC		(6)
2016–2019	Kota Ranger		(25)
2021–2022	Tutong Hotspurs		(1)
2023	Lun Bawang	2	(0)
2023	Kota Ranger	5	(2)
2025–	PKT	0	(0)

International career^{‡}
2008	Brunei U23		
2008–2017	Brunei	6	(1)
- * Club domestic league appearances and goals as of 6 April 2025 ‡ National team caps and goals as of 27 July 2022

Muhammad Abu Bakar bin Mahari (born 11 February 1985) is a Bruneian footballer playing as a striker for Penabai Kuala Tutong FT. He is nicknamed the "Eto'o of Tutong" due to similarities in appearance and footballing qualities with Samuel Eto'o of Cameroon.

== Club career ==
After impressive displays for the Prisons Department and NBT FC in the domestic league, Abu Bakar was drafted in to play for Brunei's sole professional club DPMM FC in the Singaporean S.League and he contributed 3 goals in 20 matches, winning the 2009 Singapore League Cup.

Abu Bakar was sent on loan to his old club the Prisons Department while DPMM could not resume playing due to a FIFA ban. In this period, he suffered an injury which kept him out for a year. Contemplating retirement, his then-coach Vjeran Simunić finally convinced him to play for DPMM in their comeback season in 2012, but he only managed to appear in 4 games before being released.

Abu Bakar subsequently played for Jerudong FC in the 2012–13 Brunei Super League, then QAF FC the following year. He dropped a division in 2015, appearing for re-banded Kasuka FC in the 2015 Brunei Premier League. He scored six goals to help Kasuka gain promotion to the 2016 Brunei Super League.

Abu Bakar moved to Kota Ranger FC in 2016. He scored four goals against Menglait FC in his club's opening match for the 2017 Brunei Super League. On 11 August, in a match that pitted two unbeaten teams in the Super League, Abu Bakar scored two goals to beat his club's direct rivals MS ABDB. The 2–1 score would send Kota Ranger three points clear off the top of the 11-team league.

Abu Bakar finished the 2017–18 season as the second highest top scorer (behind Abdul Azizi Ali Rahman) with 22 goals. His team also finished second in the league, three points off the champions MS ABDB. He was unable to recapture his goalscoring form in the following season, but managed to win the FA Cup instead.

In 2025, he captained PKT FT competing in the 2025 Brunei FA Cup.

== International career ==
Abu Bakar was selected for the Brunei national under-23 football team competing in the 2008 Sukma Games in Malaysia.

Abu Bakar made his national team debut in a 0–1 loss against Philippines on 13 May 2008. His first goal came against Laos in a 2–3 reverse in the 2008 AFF Suzuki Cup qualification on 23 October the same year.

Abu Bakar's league form in 2017 forced the doors to an international callup in December for the 2017 Aceh World Solidarity Tsunami Cup, nine years after last representing his country.

== International goals ==
Goal	Date	Venue	Opponent	Score	Result	Competition
1.	23 October 2008	National Olympic Stadium, Phnom Penh, Cambodia	Laos	2–1	2–3	2008 AFF Suzuki Cup qualification

== Honours ==
=== Team ===
Brunei DPMM FC

- Singapore League Cup (2): 2009, 2012
- S.League: 2012 Runner-Up

Kota Ranger FC

- Brunei FA Cup: 2018–19
