= Afi Aminuddin =

Bruneian footballer

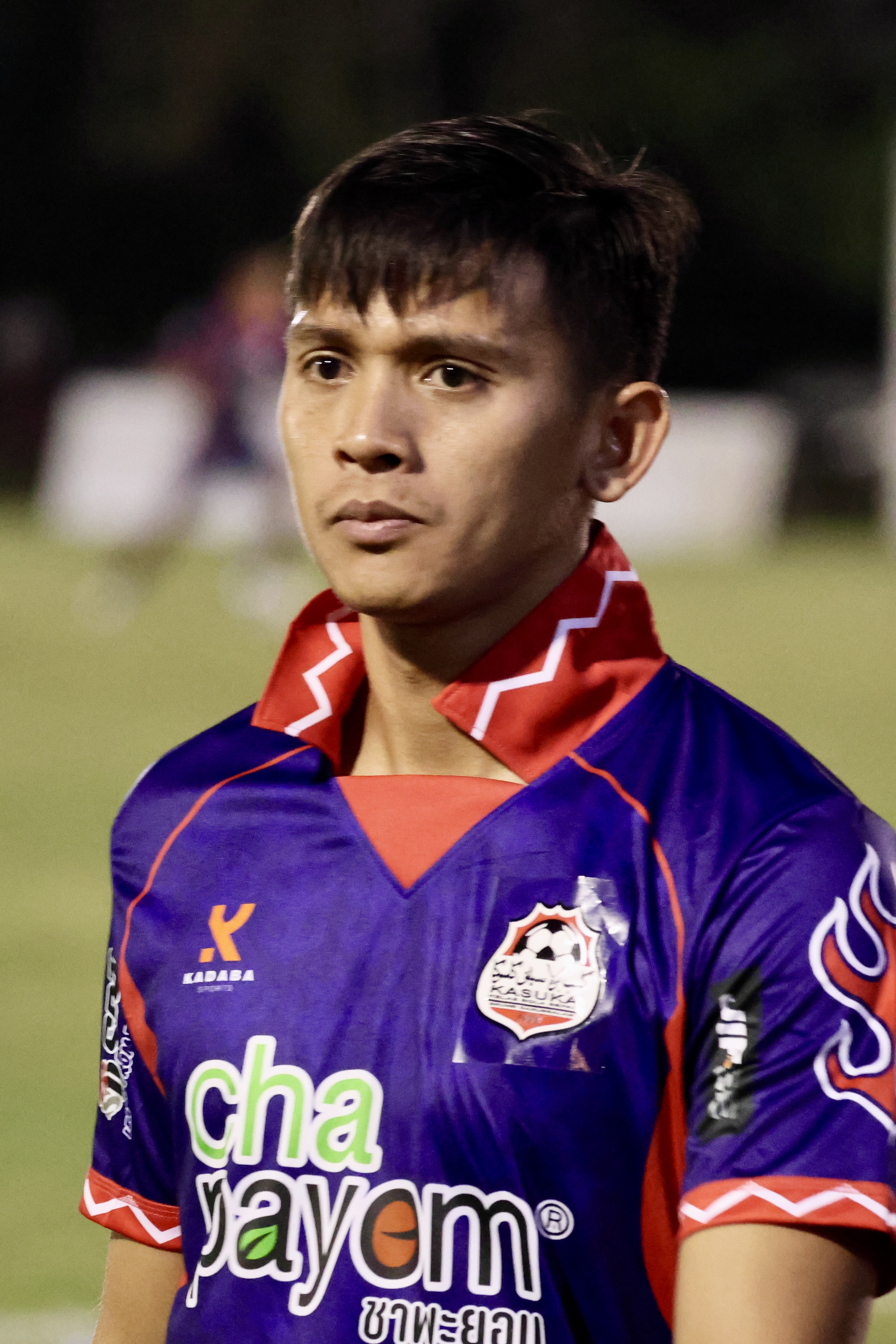
- Afi with Kasuka in 2024

Personal information
- Full name: Muhammad 'Afi bin Aminuddin
- Date of birth: 9 October 1991 (age 35)
- Place of birth: Brunei
- Height: 1.77 m (5 ft 9 1/2 in)
- Position: Defender

Team information
- Current team: Kasuka FC
- Number: 2

Youth career
- 2006–2011: Sports School

Senior career*
Years	Team	Apps	(Gls)
2010	DPMM	0	(0)
2010–2011	→ Indera (loan)		
2012–2016	Indera		(4)
2017–2020	Kota Ranger		(2)
2021–	Kasuka	36	(2)

International career^{‡}
2012	Brunei U21	6	(0)
2013	Brunei U23	3	(0)
2012–	Brunei	24	(0)
- * Club domestic league appearances and goals as of 18 November 2026 ‡ National team caps and goals as of 9 June 2026

Muhammad 'Afi bin Aminuddin is a Bruneian footballer who plays as a defender for Brunei Super League club Kasuka and the Brunei national team. He is currently the club captain of his team.

== Club career ==
Afi attended Brunei Sports School, the institution that also produced Brunei international footballers such as Azwan Ali Rahman and Hazwan Hamzah. He was drafted into professional club DPMM FC playing in the Singapore league in 2010, but due to the ban imposed by FIFA on Brunei he was sent on loan to Indera SC along with five other players.

Afi signed full terms with Indera not long after and has won two league championships with them. After four seasons, he transferred to Kota Ranger FC. He scored his first goal for the Rangers in the penultimate game of the season, a 1–1 draw with MS PDB on 18 February 2018. He was appointed club captain from the 2018-19 season, then led the team to winning the 2018-19 Brunei FA Cup on 22 April 2019 in a 2–1 victory.

Afi exited Kota Ranger after three years and signed for Kasuka FC in June 2021. In the following year, he played in the final of the FA Cup, losing 2–1 to brother Wafi's team DPMM FC. He then won the 2023 Brunei Super League with his side undefeated in 16 matches.

In the 2024–25 season, he took over the captaincy from Maududi Hilmi Kasmi and steered his side to a second league championship after 13 games, securing a personal fourth Brunei Super League medal. He was to be denied of a fifth on the final day of the 2025–26 season when his previous club Indera beat them 3–2 to seize the title away from Kasuka.

== International career ==
Afi played all six games in Brunei U21s' maiden Hassanal Bolkiah Trophy victory in 2012. He also turned out for the under-23s at the 2013 SEA Games.

Afi made his international debut for Brunei on 26 September 2012 in a 0–5 loss against Indonesia. He was ever-present in the 2012 AFF Suzuki Cup qualification but did not play at all for the 2014 edition. He was called up for the 2018 FIFA World Cup qualifiers against Chinese Taipei in March 2015, but did not take the field. A year later, he was selected for the 2016 AFF Suzuki Cup qualification but only appeared once as a substitute.

After Kwon Oh-son was reinstated as the national team head coach, he re-utilized Afi who had played regularly for him for his first match back at the helm at the 2016 AFC Solidarity Cup held in Kuching, Malaysia. Afi became the regular centre-back for fourth-placed Brunei in the tournament, appearing in four matches overall. He was again selected by Kwon for the Brunei squad contesting the 2018 AFF Suzuki Cup qualification matches against Timor-Leste in early September.

Helped by his impressive form for Kota Ranger in 2019, Afi was picked for the 2022 World Cup qualification matches against Mongolia in June. He subsequently made two appearances as a substitute.

On 11 September 2023, Afi was given a starting berth for the away friendly against Hong Kong and played for 70 minutes until he was substituted by Hazwan Hamzah, the hosts were cruising 7–0 at that point. He was selected for the 2026 World Cup qualification games versus Indonesia but saw no game time.

After only two substitute appearances for the national team in 2024, Afi was given a place in the starting lineup by Fabio Maciel against Lebanon in the first group game of the 2027 AFC Asian Cup qualifying on 25 March 2025, alongside brother Wafi. The Wasps were beaten 5–0 in Doha, Qatar.

Maciel selected Afi for the international fixtures in June 2025 for the Wasps. He made the starting lineup for the 1–0 loss to Sri Lanka in Bangkok on 5 June. In October the same year, he made a substitute appearance in a 9–0 loss against Yemen in Kuwait City. Afi also came on in the second half against Lebanon in a 0–3 defeat on 18 November.

In June 2026, Afi was selected for the squad to face Timor-Leste at the 2026 ASEAN Championship qualification under former Kasuka handler Ali Mustafa. He was the starting left-back in both games as Brunei were eliminated from the competition by a 6–1 aggregate score.

== Honours ==
=== Team ===
Indera SC

- Brunei Super League (2): 2012–13, 2014

Kota Ranger FC

- Brunei FA Cup: 2018-19
- Piala Sumbangsih: 2020

Kasuka FC

- Brunei Super League (2): 2023, 2024–25

=== International ===
Brunei national under-21 football team

- Hassanal Bolkiah Trophy: 2012

=== Individual ===
- Meritorious Service Medal (PJK; 2012)

== Personal life ==
Afi has three brothers who are also footballers. Younger brother Wafi Aminuddin plays alongside Afi in the national team and also Kasuka FC. Another brother Ulfi Aminuddin was a Brunei under-18 international and has represented the country in futsal, and was captain of Brunei's seven-a-side football team. The youngest brother, Bazli is a Brunei youth international who plays for Wijaya FC.
