= Azim Izamuddin Suhaimi =

Bruneian footballer

Azim Izamuddin
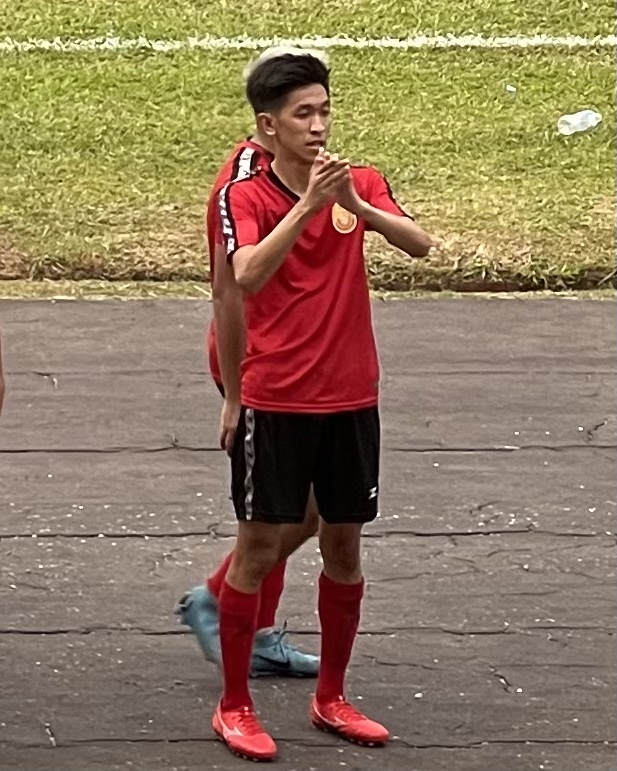

Personal information
- Full name: Muhammad Azim Izamuddin bin Haji Suhaimi
- Date of birth: 20 May 1997 (age 29)
- Place of birth: Bandar Seri Begawan, Brunei
- Position: Midfielder

Team information
- Current team: Panchor Murai FC
- Number: 16

Youth career
- 2013–2014: MSSSBD
- 2015: Tabuan Muda
- 2015–2016: DPMM FC

Senior career*
Years	Team	Apps	(Gls)
2015	Tabuan U18		
2016–2019	DPMM	5	(0)
2019	DPMM II	7	(1)
2020–2026	Kota Ranger	16	(2)
2026–	Panchor Murai	5	(0)

International career^{‡}
2018	Brunei U21	3	(0)
2017–2019	Brunei U23	8	(2)
- * Club domestic league appearances and goals as of 8 November 2026 ‡ National team caps and goals as of 27 March 2019

Muhammad Azim Izamuddin bin Haji Suhaimi (born 20 May 1997) is a Bruneian footballer who plays for Panchor Murai FC of the Brunei Super League as a midfielder.

== Club career ==
Azim was a participant of the footballing scheme run by Brunei Darussalam Schools' Sports Council (MSSSBD) under the Ministry of Education, whilst attending Sayyidina Hasan Secondary School. He was soon scouted by Brunei's football association NFABD and placed him in the Tabuan Under-18 team in the 2015 Brunei Premier League.

Azim attended a tryout for DPMM FC's Under-19 team in early 2015 and was selected by Steve Kean as the team's captain. He progressed well through the ranks and was awarded with a promotion to the first team at the start of the 2016 S.League season, alongside Abdul Hafiz Abdul Rahim and Na'im Tarif. He made his competitive debut in a 3–0 loss to Ceres-La Salle in the quarterfinals of the 2016 Singapore Cup on 30 June 2016.

On 21 July, Azim came on as a second-half substitute against Tampines Rovers and later capitalized on a mistake from Joey Sim to score the winner of the match, enabling DPMM to qualify as group winners in the 2016 Singapore League Cup group stage. His team went all the way to the final later that month, but Azim could only watch from the bench as DPMM lose to Albirex Niigata (S) in a 0–2 scoreline. Azim finally made his S.League debut on 11 August in a 1–1 stalemate against Geylang International, coming on as an 82nd-minute substitute.

Azim played for the academy side of his club that competed in the 2018-19 Brunei Premier League in early 2019. He appeared in all seven matches and was the captain for the final game of the season when they were crowned champions of the league. However he was barely in Adrian Pennock's plans in the first team, and was let go after the 2019 season ended, making only a single substitute appearance in two years.

Azim joined Kota Ranger FC for the 2020 Brunei Super League season, winning the Piala Sumbangsih in his first appearance on 8 February against MS ABDB. He scored his first goal for the club in a 11–0 victory over Panchor Murai on 27 June 2021.

== International career ==
Azim was selected for the 2018 AFC U-23 Championship qualification matches held in Myanmar in July 2017, his first involvement with the national team at any level. He made his debut in the first group game against Australia as a second-half substitute in a 2–0 loss. He started the third and final game against Singapore and scored a consolation for the Young Wasps in the 1–4 defeat.

One year later, Azim was selected for the 2018 Hassanal Bolkiah Trophy with the under-21s. He started the opening match on 23 April, which was a 0–1 loss against Timor-Leste. He was relegated to the substitutes' bench in their second game against Thailand, but came on later in the match and took the corner that club teammate Yura Yunos scored the winner from.

Azim was once again chosen to play for the under-23s at the 2020 AFC U-23 Championship qualification round held in Vietnam in late March 2019. He was a second-half substitute in the second game against Thailand where Brunei were comprehensibly beaten 0–8. He also came on late for an injured Martin Haddy Khallidden in the final game against Indonesia and scored a retaken penalty in the 85th minute after the dismissal of goalkeeper Muhammad Riyandi for a second bookable offence. (The initial penalty by Nur Asyraffahmi Norsamri was saved by Riyandi but he was booked for stepping off his line before the kick was taken. With Garuda Muda having used all three substitutes, stand-in keeper Dimas Drajad was unable to stop Azim's spotkick, but later saved another penalty in injury time. The game ended 2–1 to Indonesia.)

== Honours ==
DPMM FC

- Brunei Premier League: 2018-19
- Singapore Premier League: 2019

Kota Ranger

- Piala Sumbangsih: 2020
