= DPMM FC II =

Bruneian football club

DPMM II
- Full name: Duli Pengiran Muda Mahkota Football Club II
- Founded: 2002; 24 years ago as Mahkota United
- Ground: Jerudong Park Mini Stadium
- Capacity: 500
- Chairman: Prince Al-Muhtadee Billah
- Head Coach: Subhi Bakir
- League: Brunei Super League
- 2024–25: 2nd
- Website: www.dpmmfc.club

Duli Pengiran Muda Mahkota Football Club II (English: His Royal Highness the Crown Prince of Brunei Football Club II; abbrev: DPMM II) is the reserve team of DPMM, playing in the Brunei Super League.

== History ==
=== Mahkota United (2002) ===
Back in 2002, The club was established as a junior feeder team named Mahkota United padded with several international players transitioning to compete at the DPMM Invitational Cup held in April–May of that year. Among the youngsters who played for Mahkota United at the tournament were Azman Ilham Noor, Rodrigo Prieto and George O'Callaghan. They reached the final of the tournament, where they were beaten 5–1 by the senior side courtesy of an Ajayi Oluseye hat-trick.

=== Reformation in the domestic league (2019–2020) ===
In the 2019 Brunei Premier League season, Mahkota United entered a youthful team as a brand-new member of the league, thus re-entering domestic competition for the first time since their departure for the Malaysia Premier League in 2005 thus rebanding the club name as DPMM II, serving as the feeder club for DPMM.. Their ranks were boosted by three senior players which were Abdul Azizi Ali Rahman, Azim Izamuddin Suhaimi and Azwan Ali Rahman.

After nine games including the final match against contenders Tabuan Muda, the team became the champions of the league and won promotion to the Brunei Super League before a league restructuring by NFABD meant that the top tier was expanded to 16 teams in the 2020 season.

DPMM II played only two games in the league after it commenced due to the worldwide COVID-19 pandemic. When football resumed in 2021, the first team elected to play domestically, disbanding the reserve team once again.

=== Current iteration (2024–present) ===
DPMM II's first team re-entered the Singapore Premier League in the 2023 season, thus vacating their place in the top tier of the Brunei league system of that year. At the start of the 2024–25 Brunei Super League, DPMM entered a team consisting of their under-20 players who won the Brunei Youth League Under-20 earlier in the year, captained by the chairman's son, Prince Abdul Muntaqim. The team won all of their games leading into the final match of the season on 2 February 2025 against second-placed Kasuka, trailing by two points. Their opponents prevailed in the match 2–3, surrendering their lead at the top of the table on the last day.

In the 2025 Brunei FA Cup, DPMM II emerged as the victors of the knockout competition after a 1–0 victory against Indera SC in the final.

DPMM II did not play at the 2025–26 Brunei Super League, but returned in the 2026–27 season.

== Players ==
=== Current squad ===
As of 12 September 2026

Note: Flags indicate national team as defined under FIFA eligibility rules; some limited exceptions apply. Players may hold more than one non-FIFA nationality.

No.	Pos.	Nation	Player
1	GK	BRU	Abdul Azeez Elyas
4	DF	BRU	Azrin Danial Yusra
6	MF	BRU	Azwan Saleh
7	MF	BRU	Faturrahman Embran
8	FW	BRU	Abdul Azim Abdul Rasid
9	FW	BRU	Abdul Azizi Ali Rahman
10	FW	BRU	Sahfiq Hidayat Sahrizam
11	MF	BRU	Zainul Ariffin Mahdinee
17	MF	BRU	Prince Abdul Muntaqim (Captain)
18	FW	BRU	Razimie Ramlli
19	MF	BRU	Haziq Naqiuddin Syamra

No.	Pos.	Nation	Player
20	FW	BRA	Kauã
21	DF	BRU	Abdul Aziz Tamit
22	FW	BRA	Jefferson Baiano
25	GK	BRU	Jefri Syafiq Ishak
40	DF	BRU	Amirul Umar Saiful Rizal
41	DF	BRU	Ahmad Mustafa Ahmad Omar
42	DF	BRU	Adi Idham Sazali
47	MF	BRU	Faris Fadillah Saiful Bahari
55	DF	BRU	Azri Danial Yusra
58	GK	BRU	Akmal Hafiy Punggut
60	FW	BRU	Ali Arsyad Alihan

== Honours ==
- Brunei FA Cup: 2025

== Notable players ==
As of 2026–27 season.

Foreigners that has strictly signed and played for DPMM II.

AFC/OFC.: (Japan) Kenshin Uneo; (Japan) Shuhei Sasahara; (Kyrgyzstan) Bakhtiyar Duyshobekov; (South Korea) Choi Ji-ho	CAF.: (Ghana) Abdul Salam	UEFA.: (Spain) Matias Hernandez; (Spain) Sergio Mendigutxia	CONMEBOL/ CONCACAF.: (Brazil) Jefferson Baiano; (Brazil) Kauã; (Brazil) Marcelo Jr

== Managerial history ==
- (Brunei) Helme Panjang (2024–2025)
- (Brunei) Subhi Bakir (2026–present)
