= AKSE Bersatu =

Bruneian football team

AKSE Bersatu FC
- Full name: Angkatan Kampong Setia Bersatu Football Club
- Founded: 2012; 14 years ago
- Ground: Various
- President: Hairol Haimi Usop
- Head coach: Hazreen Masri
- League: Brunei Super League
- 2024–25: 9th
Home colours	Away colours

Angkatan Kampong Setia Bersatu Football Club or simply AKSE Bersatu FC is a football club in Brunei. The club originates from the twin villages of Setia in Sungai Kebun, Kampong Ayer.

== History ==
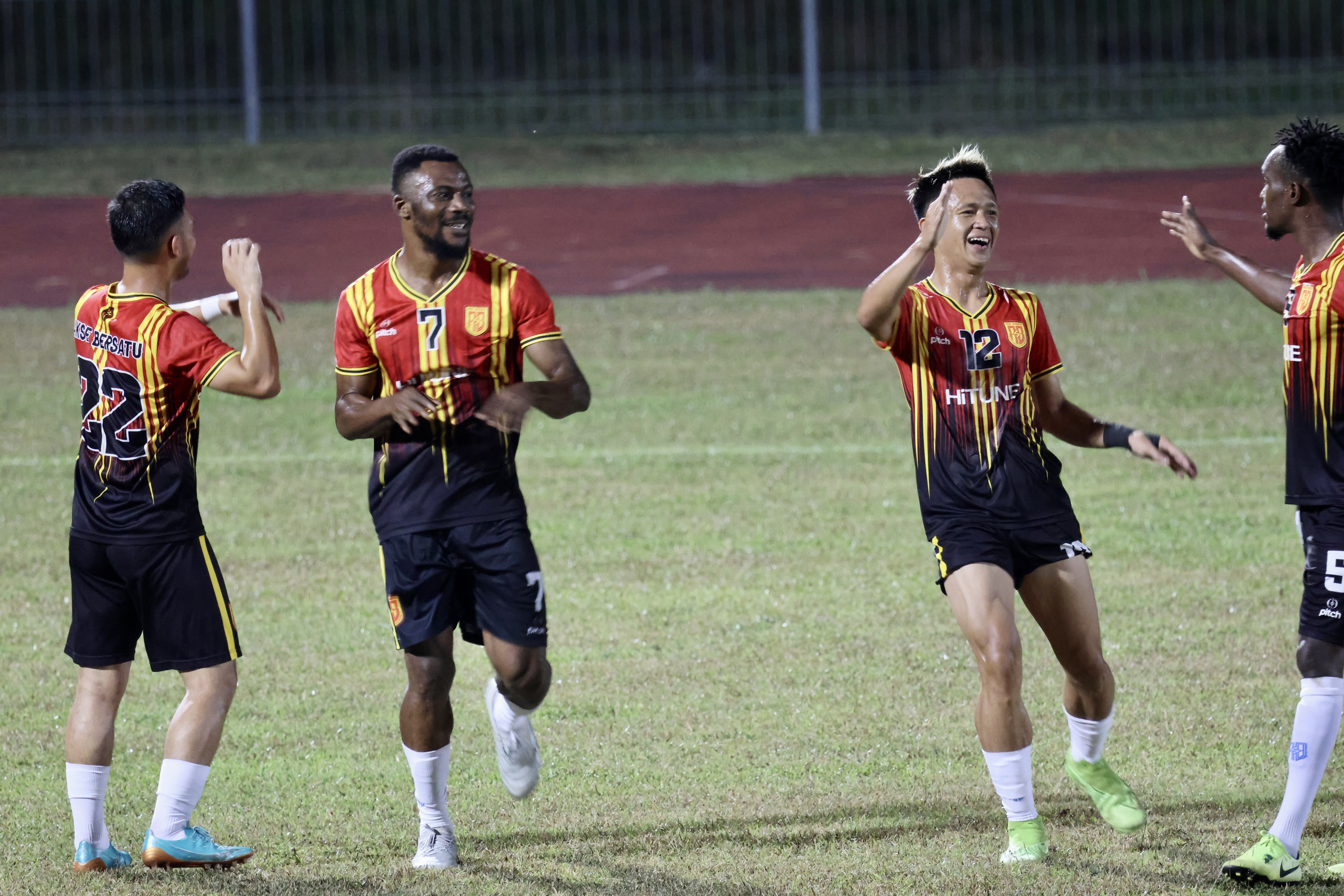
2023 Brunei Super League match between AKSE and Jerudong

AKSE Bersatu was founded in 2012 from the merging of two Brunei-Muara district clubs, namely Persatuan AKSE (Setia Village Community Association) and Setia Bersatu. They were well-established clubs which presence was limited to district level competition. The newly formed team entered the 2012 Brunei FA Cup in the first round where they were eliminated by eventual winners MS ABDB.

They have been members of the Brunei-Muara District League since 2015, reaching a third-place finish in 2018. After two cancelled district league campaigns, they became the winner of the 2022 edition by beating Ar Rawda in the final by 3 goals to nil, essentially winning promotion to the Brunei Super League.

== Current squad ==
As of 19 January 2025

Note: Flags indicate national team as defined under FIFA eligibility rules; some limited exceptions apply. Players may hold more than one non-FIFA nationality.

No.	Pos.	Nation	Player
1	GK	BRU	Abdul Matin Ramli
2	DF	BRU	Shahronny Awang (captain)
3	DF	BRU	Azrul Salleh
4	DF	BRU	Hazwan Hazmain
5	DF	BRU	Kasyfil Anuar Zamain
6	DF	BRU	Hamizan Kasim
7	MF	BRU	Yaakub Matyassin
8	FW	BRU	Hazrul Mohammed
9	MF	BRU	Ian Jeremy Anak Kalum
10	MF	BRU	Zainul Ariffin Mahdinee
11	MF	BRU	Hamdi Roslan
12	DF	BRU	Syafiq Waqiuddin Rino Wira Karno
13	DF	BRU	Abdul Malik Norazlan
14	FW	BRU	Syam Sulaimi Jamahat
15	MF	BRU	Hasmadi Wahit

No.	Pos.	Nation	Player
16	DF	BRU	Hussain Salleh
17	MF	BRU	Syamsuddin Samsul
18	MF	BRU	Fadzil Ismail Hamdani
19	MF	BRU	Aidil Yusri Kadir
20	MF	MAR	Zineddine Rafik
21	DF	BRU	Hafizzudin Salleh
22	MF	BRU	Shahril Adzuan Awang
23	MF	BRU	Zainulariffin Ahmad
24	GK	BRU	Izzuan Hakimi Khairul Nizam
25	GK	BRU	Abdul Mutalip Muhammad
26	DF	BRU	Muaz Qamaruddin Nordin
27	DF	IDN	Yudha Erik Rizkyanto
28	FW	BRU	Rahimin Rashid
29	DF	BRU	Amiruddin Salleh
30	FW	BRU	Sahfiq Hidayat Sharizam

== Honours ==
- Brunei-Muara District League
  - Champions (1): 2022
