= 2020 Brunei Super League =

Brunei Super League
- Season: 2020
- Matches: 16
- Goals: 64 (4 per match)

The 2020 Brunei Super League was the seventh season of the Brunei Super League, the top Bruneian professional league for association football clubs, since its establishment in 2012. The season began on 28 January.

This season saw the expansion of the league to 16 teams, who were selected through a vetting process. All ten teams from the previous campaign were retained, including Najip FC who are now called BAKES FC. Meanwhile, teams from the 2018-19 Brunei Premier League are DPMM FC II, Tabuan FC, BSRC FC, Panchor Murai FC and Rimba Star FC. Kuala Belait FC were also included as winners of the Belait District football tournament. Shortly after the announcement of the teams, Lun Bawang FC was replaced by Jerudong FC.

On 13 March, the NFABD announced that the league would be suspended indefinitely, due to the ongoing COVID-19 pandemic.

On 19 September, NFABD announced the cancellation of the league.

== Teams ==
- BAKES FC
- BSRC FC
- DPMM FC II
- IKLS-MB5 FC
- Indera SC
- Jerudong FC
- Kasuka FC
- KB FC
- Kota Ranger FC
- MS ABDB
- MS PPDB
- Panchor Murai FC
- Rimba Star FC
- Setia Perdana FC
- Tabuan FC
- Wijaya FC

== Foreign players ==
Club	Player 1	Player 2	Player 3	Player 4	Former Players
BAKES FC					
BSRC FC					
DPMM FC II	(Japan) Shuhei Sasahara	(Ghana) Abdul Salam			(South Korea) Choi Ji-ho
IKLS-MB5					
Indera SC	(Nigeria) Kingsley Nkurumeh	(Malaysia) Tekson Tubeng	(Nigeria) Emmanuel Samson	(Nigeria) Micheal Henry	
Jerudong FC	(Indonesia) Fatkur Rokhim	(Indonesia) Yansen Efendi			
Kasuka FC	(Liberia) Leon Taylor	(Ivory Coast) Franck Yapo			
KB FC					
Kota Ranger	(South Sudan) Bernard Agele	(Malaysia) Aidil Safee	(Malaysia) Ranilson Batuil	(Malaysia) Alrafiq Mirza	
MS ABDB					
MS PPDB					
Panchor Murai					
Rimba Star					
Setia Perdana	(Indonesia) Rijal Ruwloh	(Indonesia) Yudi Setiawandi			
Tabuan					
Wijaya FC					

Note: MS ABDB (Royal Brunei Armed Forces), MS PPDB (Royal Brunei Police Force) and Tabuan (Brunei national under-21 football team) do not field foreigners

== League table ==
Pos	Team	Pld	W	D	L	GF	GA	GD	Pts	Qualification or relegation
1	Kota Ranger	2	2	0	0	9	0	+9	6	Qualification for AFC Cup play-off round
2	Kasuka	2	2	0	0	9	2	+7	6	
3	Jerudong	2	2	0	0	4	0	+4	6	
4	MS ABDB	2	1	1	0	7	1	+6	4	
5	DPMM	2	1	1	0	5	1	+4	4	
6	Wijaya	2	1	1	0	3	2	+1	4	
7	Indera	2	1	0	1	11	4	+7	3	
8	BSRC	2	1	0	1	5	4	+1	3	
9	BAKES	2	1	0	1	3	4	−1	3	
10	Tabuan	2	1	0	1	2	4	−2	3	
11	Kuala Belait	2	1	0	1	3	7	−4	3	
12	MS PPDB	2	0	1	1	2	3	−1	1	
13	Panchor Murai	2	0	0	2	1	6	−5	0	
14	Setia Perdana (Note: Setia Perdana has a better fair play record)	2	0	0	2	0	8	−8	0	
15	IKLS	2	0	0	2	0	8	−8	0	
16	Rimba Star	2	0	0	2	1	11	−10	0	

Source: NFABD
Rules for classification: 1) Points; 2) Goal difference; 3) Goals scored; 4) No. of wins; 5) Head-to-head; 6) Fair play record

== See also ==
- 2020 Brunei FA Cup
