= BAKES FC =

Bruneian football club

BAKES
- Full name: Bahtera Kemudi Sekawan Football Club
- Founded: 2005; 21 years ago, as PSUT-KHEDN
- Ground: Various
- Owner: Yuslan Ahmad
- Head coach: Endy Azri Idris
| Home colours | Away colours |

Bahtera Kemudi Sekawan Football Club (Malay: Kelab Bola Sepak Bahtera Kemudi Sekawan), or abbreviation BAKES, formerly PSUT-KHEDN, is a football club in Brunei. The name directly translates to Camaraderie-Steered Galleon.

== History ==
Back in 2005, a few coworkers who were employed by the Ministry of Home Affairs (MoHA) got together to play some casual football. Only ten years later did casual football grow into a serious sport. Weekly friendlies were played, and although coming from all departments, there was a strong relationship between the participants. Only seven players from the initial pool survived after activities and stats were recorded starting in 2010.

In 2015, they changed their name to PSUT-KHEDN, and effective organizational structures were put in place for the management. For MoHA, it was intended to establish a sports council akin to the ones for the MS PDB and MS ABDB. The acronym BAKES stood for Badan Kemajuan Keagamaan Sukan. They initially joined the district league under the name BAKES FT, and it wasn't until 2016 that BAKES FC was officially registered as Bahtera Kemudi Sekawan.

In 2017, one of the Najip I-Team committee members approached by the owner of BAKES FC, Awang Hj Yuslan bin Awang Hj Ahmad, with an offer to purchase Najip FC a year later. After a brief meeting, they decided to purchase it, taking on 40% of the players. The acquisition made it possible for BAKES to join the Super League. Given that the deadline fell right before the beginning of the season, it was a short one. Before BAKES was legalized last year, they played under the Najip FC name for two seasons. Although they were briefly allowed to rename to Najip-BAKES FC, the name change was not approved until 2020.

On 21 July 2021, the club suffered one of the biggest defeats going against DPMM FC which resulted 16–1 during the Super League at Jerudong Park Mini Stadium. Though BAKES participated in the 2022 FA Cup, they did not qualify after being placed 3rd in Group B of the group stage.

After finishing in 13th place in the 2023 Brunei Super League, the club announced prior to the upcoming season that they have withdrawn their participation.

== Club officials ==
| Position | Staff | Ref |
|---|---|---|
| Head coach | (Brunei) Endy Azri Idris | |
| Team manager | (Brunei) Adi Indra Sarigan Sulaiman | |
| Deputy manager | (Brunei) Abdul Rahman Idris | |
| Assistant coaches | (Brunei) Yunsi Rahman (Brunei) Hambrin Tuah (Brunei) Razi Lamit (Brunei) Hurdy Duming (Brunei) Fardzillah Abdullah | |
| Assistant managers | (Brunei) Amran Kula (Brunei) Aji Fazri Jamil (Brunei) Suhaili Ali Ahmad Liga (Brunei) Azri Azizan Ramli | |

== Current squad ==
As of 30 June 2023

Note: Flags indicate national team as defined under FIFA eligibility rules; some limited exceptions apply. Players may hold more than one non-FIFA nationality.

| No. | Pos. | Nation | Player |
|---|---|---|---|
| 2 | DF | BRU | Abdul Azim Hassan |
| 4 | MF | BRU | Razi Lamit (captain) |
| 5 | DF | BRU | Waqiuddin Yusri |
| 6 | DF | BRU | Fikri Noor |
| 7 | MF | BRU | Abdul Qawi Ramli |
| 8 | MF | BRU | Hamdillah Elmiee Sharbini |
| 9 | FW | BRU | Nor Alifullah Zaini |
| 10 | FW | BRU | Nur Fikri Kamaluddin |
| 11 | FW | MAR | Mohcine El Araichi |
| 12 | DF | BRU | Arif Adam |
| 13 | MF | BRU | Iradatul Qudus Abu Talip |
| 14 | MF | BRU | Afif Hadi Roshidi |
| 15 | DF | BRU | Rafi Abdul Aziz |
| 16 | FW | BRU | Abdul Muiz Waliyuddin Ramlee |
| 17 | DF | BRU | Fazziuddin Soliman |
| 18 | DF | BRU | Khairol Nazrin Zamhari |

| No. | Pos. | Nation | Player |
|---|---|---|---|
| 19 | FW | BRU | Ariff Abu Samah |
| 21 | FW | BRU | Iqbal Safwan Roshidi |
| 22 | DF | BRU | Azrin Shahnizam Mahadhir |
| 23 | MF | BRU | Aqiel Rizwan Aliuddin |
| 24 | GK | BRU | Alaisa Fadillah Rosli |
| 25 | GK | BRU | Shah Mirzan Roslan |
| 26 | MF | BRU | Kamarul Ariffin Zaini |
| 27 | FW | BRU | Raziman Abdul Rahman |
| 28 | DF | BRU | Asri Ali Hashim |
| 29 | FW | BRU | Abubakar Ash-Shiddiq Mahmud |
| 30 | DF | BRU | Fadzrin Iskandar Muslin |
| — | DF | BRU | Ashaari Maidin |
| — | MF | IDN | Indra Kurniawan |
| — | DF | BRU | Fitri Yassin |
| — | FW | BRU | Wafiyuddin Jefry |
| — | MF | BRU | Zul Harun Jamil |
