= Menglait FC =

- Full name: Menglait Football Club
- Founded: 1982
- Player-Coach: Sallehuddin Sarifudin
- League: Brunei-Muara District League
- 2018: 10th (relegation)
- Website: http://clubmenglait.blogspot.com/

Menglait Football Club is a football (soccer) club from Brunei that played in the Brunei Super League. They were founded in 1982.

== Current squad ==
Note: Flags indicate national team as defined under FIFA eligibility rules; some limited exceptions apply. Players may hold more than one non-FIFA nationality.

No.	Pos.	Nation	Player
1	GK	(Brunei) BRU	Yazrul Azwin Yusrin
2	DF	(Brunei) BRU	Nasrullah Zepry
3	DF	(Brunei) BRU	Hilman Umar
4	DF	(Brunei) BRU	Khalid Wassadisalleh Mahmud
5	DF	(Brunei) BRU	Faiq Syakrani
6	DF	(Brunei) BRU	Nasrul Haddy Bujang
7	MF	(Brunei) BRU	Nazirul Zulhilmi Annuar
8	DF	(Brunei) BRU	Thaqif Ruzaini Abdul Manan
9	FW	(Brunei) BRU	Nazirul Azim Annuar (Captain)
10	FW	(Brunei) BRU	Nurhidayat Abbas
11	MF	(Brunei) BRU	Azim Hamidon

No.	Pos.	Nation	Player
12	MF	(Brunei) BRU	Ikmal Samsul
13	DF	(Brunei) BRU	Amiruddin Nizam Said
14	DF	(Brunei) BRU	Mafazi Hilmi Mohammad
15	FW	(Brunei) BRU	Haziq Kasyful Azim Hasimulabdillah
16	FW	(Brunei) BRU	Faiz Fakhri Damit
17	DF	(Brunei) BRU	Fazirol Fadillah Amat
20	MF	(Brunei) BRU	Sallehuddin Sarifudin
21	DF	(Brunei) BRU	Khairul Azim Mohammad
23	FW	(Brunei) BRU	Darsoto Tjhia
25	GK	(Brunei) BRU	Lim Jin Yee
—	GK	(Brunei) BRU	Alaisa Fadillah Rosli
