= BSRC FC =

Bruneian football club

- Full name: Brunei Shell Recreational Club Football Club
- Founded: 2004; 22 years ago, as Brunei Shell FT
- Ground: BSRC Field
- Chairman: Ashraf Mohd Esa
- Head Coach: Hailmey Ariffin
- League: Brunei Super League
- 2025–26: 9th
Home colours	Away colours

Brunei Shell Recreation Club Football Club (abbrev: BSRC FC), formerly Brunei Shell FC represents the football department of Brunei Shell Recreational Club situated in Panaga, Belait.

== History ==
The team was founded in 2004 and originally known as Brunei Shell FT. Awang Hj Aji bin Hitam was in charge of this team in 2004. This team has had a number of managers over the years, and at the moment, Awang Hj Ismail bin Hj Bakar holds the position in conjunction with Head Coach Hailmey Ariffin. The team's objective is to represent the Belait District in the leagues run by Football Association of Brunei Darussalam (FABD) and develop into a hub for young people in the district to hone their football skills.

The BSRC FC are more focused on the Brunei League match later in order to improve the skill of the Kuala Belait youngsters in football games. According to BSRC FC Public Relations, Bibi Azlina stated that they are certain that BSRC will be able to perform to their highest potential and will be highly committed and enthusiastic to learn from their mistakes in prior league matches. The club started entering a football team for Brunei's domestic football competition the B-League in 2004, finishing 10th in the newly organized second level Premier Two. They managed to play in the top-flight in only two seasons, 2007/08 and 2009/10.

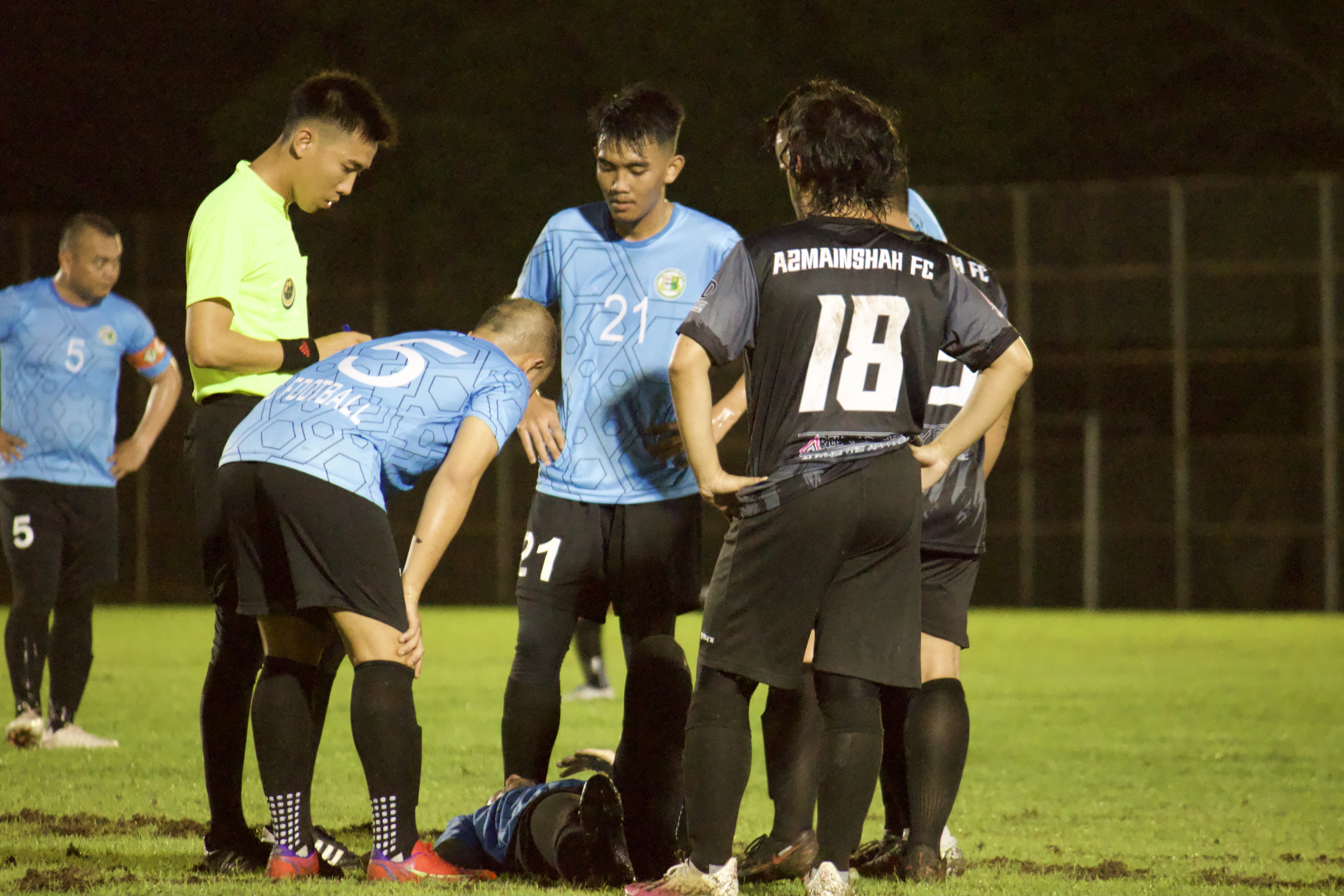
BSRC playing against Azmainshah FC during the 2022 FA Cup's group stage.

The club was renamed as BSRC FT in 2011 and finished third in the Brunei Premier League in 2018 and advanced to the Brunei FA Cup semifinals, where Kota Ranger faced stiff competition in 2019. To comply with Club Licensing rules, this team's name was once more changed in 2019 to BSRC FC, which it still uses today. When the Brunei Super League was expanded to 16 teams, BSRC FT was included as new participants. The BSRC FC Team had been conducting field training every Monday and Tuesday night before the COVID-19 epidemic developed. The team will work out in the gym on Wednesday night, then work out privately on Thursday, and then play a friendly match on Friday. Training is only offered at this time on Mondays, Wednesdays, and Fridays.

== Current squad ==
As of 18 September 2026

Note: Flags indicate national team as defined under FIFA eligibility rules; some limited exceptions apply. Players may hold more than one non-FIFA nationality.

No.	Pos.	Nation	Player
1	GK	BRU	Yunus Shahlan
3	MF	BRU	Za'yad Qushairry Abdul Hafis Ideris
4	DF	BRU	Fatron Kasdy Kaseh
5	DF	BRU	Aizuddin Abdul Rahman
6	DF	BRU	Azhar Saifulbahri
7	FW	BRU	Faris Ar-Rayyan Yahya
8	FW	BRU	Danish Aqasya Khoo Syazwan
9	FW	BRU	Wardy Anak Henry
10	FW	BRU	Noorhisham Yakup
11	MF	BRU	Ilyas Ilyasa Yahya
12	MF	BRU	Hafizul Hasnal (Captain)
13	DF	BRU	Irwan Abdul Rashid
14	MF	BRU	Jimmy Mancha Anak Sibuang
15	DF	BRU	Khairol Aminuddin Ahmad
16	MF	BRU	Nilson Kennedy
17	MF	BRU	Mirza Nursyakirin Abdullah Shahrin

No.	Pos.	Nation	Player
18	FW	BRU	Iqbal Abrisam Saffari
19	DF	BRU	Wan Aswaff Hayqal Jeelan Abdullah Khairul Azmen
20	GK	BRU	Sahrizal Abdul Salim
21	DF	BRU	Sharil Alihan
22	FW	BRU	Ranieri Seggei Robert Rangia
23	MF	BRU	Daryyl Rafael Edy Asmyra
24	DF	BRU	Ainal Yakni Wasli
25	GK	BRU	Afiq Norshah
26	DF	BRU	Azhrin Azhar Abdullah Tony
27	DF	BRU	Steven Anak Maxwell
28	DF	BRU	Hairez Hailmey
29	FW	BRU	Rosedey Minggu
30	FW	BRU	Hadi Haswandy Osmidi
35	GK	BRU	Kasyfi Abdullah Khairul Ariffin
—	MF	BRU	Kafi Benny Boey

== See also ==
- List of football clubs in Brunei
- Brunei Super League
