= Rimba Star FC =

Association football club in Brunei

Rimba Star
- Full name: Rimba Star Football Club
- Founded: 2008; 18 years ago
- Ground: Various
- President: Yassin Noor
- Manager: Shamsul Rezal Ahmad
- Coach: Felix Obinna
- League: Brunei Super League
- 2025–26: 6th
Home colours	Away colours

Rimba Star Football Club is a professional football club in Brunei, playing in the Brunei Super League. The club is based in Kampong Rimba in Brunei-Muara District.

== History ==
Rimba Star was founded in 2008 by current president and manager Yassin bin Haji Mohammad Noor, and entered the District leagues in their formative years. In the 2010 Brunei FA Cup first round, they were drawn against Viva Rangers FC which boasted Shah Razen Said in their ranks and were defeated 3–2.

Rimba Star qualified for the 2011 Brunei Premier League II by beating MS PDB in the qualifying match. However, after it commenced, the league was cancelled later that June as a result of the disbanding of the organisers namely the Football Federation of Brunei Darussalam. Its successor, National Football Association of Brunei Darussalam organised a competition for a new league system, and Rimba Star finished fourth behind Indera SC, MS ABDB and MS PDB in their group. This meant that they were placed in the second tier starting with the 2014 Brunei Premier League.

Rimba Star finished in the bottom half in subsequent campaigns in the Premier League, just steering clear of relegation in some cases. In the 2018–19 season they finished bottom but with the expansion in 2020, were selected to play in the 16-team league, being a member of the Super League ever since.

== Players ==
=== Current squad ===
As of 24 November 2025

Note: Flags indicate national team as defined under FIFA eligibility rules; some limited exceptions apply. Players may hold more than one non-FIFA nationality.

No.	Pos.	Nation	Player
1	GK	BRU	Sharil Hashim
2	MF	BRU	Miftahul Rezki Shahminan
3	DF	BRU	Aiman Abdullah
4	DF	BRU	Abdul Qayyum Irwan Rino
6	DF	NGA	Kamal Yakubu
7	FW	BRU	Khairul Abdul Halim
8	DF	BRU	Nur Azees Ali
10	MF	NGA	Ishola Olaiya
11	MF	BRU	Kurmin Bini (Captain)
13	DF	BRU	Nazriuddin Ahmad
15	DF	BRU	Abdul Malik Norazlan
16	MF	BRU	Syahmi Ikhwan Idris
17	FW	BRU	Saifullah Saifuddin
18	FW	BRU	Aznil Ali

No.	Pos.	Nation	Player
20	MF	BRU	Al-Aliyshahnezan Nordin
21	MF	BRU	Alif Sahari
22	MF	BRU	Nor Shah Harris
23	FW	BRU	Aaiman Muqmin Baharudin
24	FW	BRU	Hazim Isamuddin Irwan
25	GK	BRU	Hassanuddin Damit
26	GK	BRU	Nur Hilman Nor Hillmy
27	DF	BRU	Arif Ali Rahman
28	DF	BRU	Nazri Nasriuddin
29	MF	BRU	Salahuddin Al-Ayubi Abas
30	FW	BRU	Shah Rizan Reymoon
43	MF	BRU	Fakhrul Radzi Haslin
49	DF	BRU	Arif Wa'ie Yusra
53	DF	BRU	Daniel Asyraf Mazlan
