= Panchor Murai FC =

Panchor Murai
- Full name: Panchor Murai Football Club
- Founded: 2009; 17 years ago, as MPK Panchor Murai
- Ground: Various
- Owner: Jaafar bin Hj Osman
- Chairman: Pg Zamri bin Pg Bujang
- Head coach: Hanafizal Helman Hanafiah
- League: Brunei Super League
- 2024–25: BSL, 12th of 14
Home colours	Away colours

Panchor Murai Football Club is a professional football club in Brunei, currently playing in the Brunei Super League. It takes its name from the village of Panchor Murai in Brunei-Muara District. It was formally established in 2009.

== History ==
Panchor Murai FC formerly played at the district level of Brunei's football pyramid, under the name MPK Pancur Murai. They qualified for the Brunei Premier League in 2015, and finished fourth out of 11 clubs that season. They struggled for form in the season after, barely managing to survive the drop in eighth place.

Panchor Murai finished rock bottom in the 2017 Brunei Premier League and relegation was looming for the club, until it was saved via the pulling out of DSP United and Tunas FC. They competed in the 2018–19 BPL season and managed another fourth-place finish.

When the Brunei Super League was expanded to 16 teams in 2020, Panchor Murai were announced to be participating in the league, making their top-flight debut after four seasons.

== Current squad ==
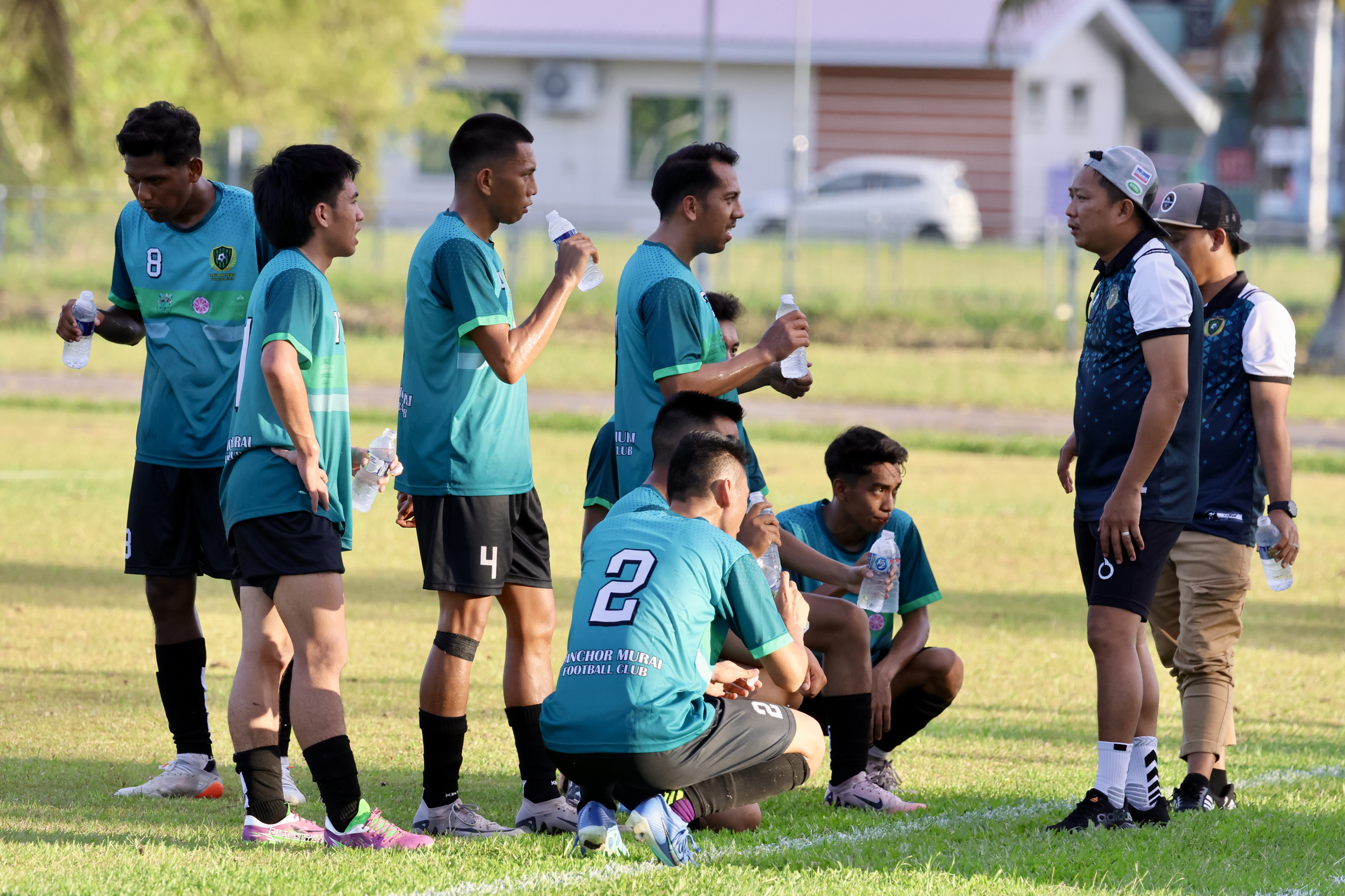
Players resting during the 2024–25 Brunei Super League match against Kuala Belait FC

As of 8 November 2026

Note: Flags indicate national team as defined under FIFA eligibility rules; some limited exceptions apply. Players may hold more than one non-FIFA nationality.

No.	Pos.	Nation	Player
1	GK	BRU	Nur Hilman Nor Hillmy
2	DF	NGR	Victor Akinyemi
3	MF	BRU	Nurshafif Tajul Ariffin
4	DF	BRU	Radzillah Abdul Ghani
5	MF	NGR	Stanley Osayande
6	DF	BRU	Khairul Alimin Ali
7	MF	BRU	Shad Maymoun Jaafar
8	FW	BRU	Habibullah Adanan
9	FW	BRU	Ahmadi Yahaya
10	MF	BRU	Syazwan Sahrin
11	MF	BRU	Samsul Masri
12	MF	BRU	Aman Abdul Rahim
13	DF	BRU	Danish Danial Alfian
14	MF	BRU	Hafis Mahari
15	DF	BRU	Kasyfil Anuar Zamain

No.	Pos.	Nation	Player
16	MF	BRU	Azim Izamuddin Suhaimi (Captain)
17	FW	BRU	Iqmal Halim Murah
18	FW	BRU	Fadhlullah Hamadi
19	DF	BRU	Alin Syahmi Hossaini
20	DF	BRU	Safwan Ikhwan Safiuddin Jasri
21	MF	BRU	Abdul Afiq Roslan
22	MF	NGR	Joshua Akinola
23	DF	BRU	Ridhwan Nokman
24	FW	BRU	Azreen Eskander Sa'oda
25	GK	BRU	Ron Junior Philip
26	FW	IDN	Tirta Bayu
27	FW	NGR	Martins Ohia
28	DF	BRU	Aaron Farihin Sahrin
30	GK	IDN	Najma Muqtafiyandanu
