= Lun Bawang FC =

Lun Bawang
- Full name: Lun Bawang Football Club
- Founded: 2002; 24 years ago
- Ground: Batu Apoi Sports Complex, Batu Apoi
- League: Brunei Super League
- 2025–26: 11th
Home colours	Away colours

Lun Bawang Football Club is a professional football club in Brunei, playing in the Brunei Super League. The club has its roots within the Lun Bawang community situated in northern Temburong District.

== History ==
Lun Bawang FC was established in 2002 by members of the Lun Bawang Murut Brunei Association (PLBMB) and entered the Brunei football league system the following year, winning qualification to the 2003 B-League. Finishing ninth in the initial group stage, the Temburong natives find themselves in the newly established second tier of the competition the B-League Premier Two in 2005. They remained in the second level of the system until 2014, when they were champions of the 2014 Brunei Premier League and won promotion to the 2015 Brunei Super League. They avoided relegation that season via goal difference in expense of IKLS FC despite losing to them in their final match of the campaign.

After consecutive bottom-half finishes for three seasons, Lun Bawang FC pulled out of the league in 2020 and was replaced by Jerudong FC. A dormant period for the club followed, which ended when the club was invited to participate in the 2022 Brunei FA Cup. They have since re-entered the Brunei Super League starting from the 2023 edition.

== Current squad ==
As of 1 October 2025

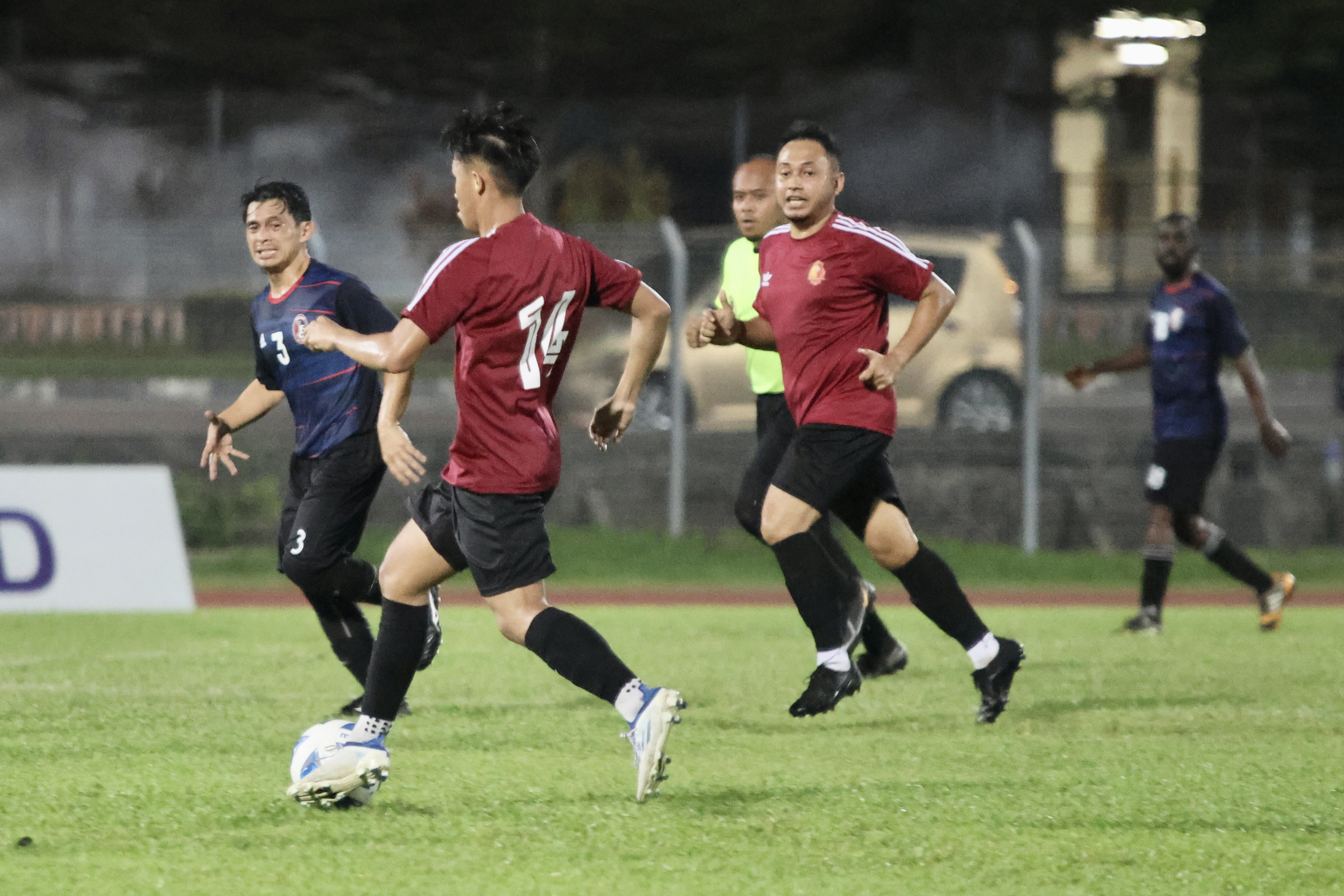
Brunei Super League match against Jerudong

Note: Flags indicate national team as defined under FIFA eligibility rules; some limited exceptions apply. Players may hold more than one non-FIFA nationality.

No.	Pos.	Nation	Player
1	GK	BRU	Denny Ezwandy Dulia
2	DF	BRU	Ottonel Udan
3	DF	BRU	Aderean Jamil
4	DF	BRU	Enrique Anak Alexander
5	MF	BRU	Edmund Ah Chua
6	MF	BRU	Zainul Aiman Zakaria
7	MF	BRU	Abdul Halim Hj Jainih
8	DF	BRU	Ederic Ah Chua
9	FW	BRU	Zailee Penchil
10	MF	BRU	Rudy Afrie Reimy
11	MF	BRU	Ehsan Moksin
12	FW	BRU	Syafiq Abdullah Elan
13	FW	BRU	Enikati Mambak
14	FW	BRU	Ainerihan Anak Rogo
15	MF	BRU	Nasiruddin Badaruddin

No.	Pos.	Nation	Player
16	DF	BRU	Zulfadhli Asli
17	MF	BRU	Faiz Fakhri Zainal Abidin
18	DF	BRU	Saifulbahri Bahrin
19	DF	BRU	Noor Zakwan Noor
20	MF	BRU	Al-Hadi Abdul Jamal
21	MF	BRU	Ahwaz Wira Abdullah Ating (Captain)
22	DF	BRU	Yaremia Emran
23	MF	BRU	Andika Aqwan Firdaus
24	MF	BRU	Rendika Hendra Anak Rogo
25	GK	BRU	Edwin Ah Chua
26	DF	BRU	Azmi Waliyyuddin Abas
27	MF	BRU	Khairil Ashraff Kamal Ariffin
28	FW	BRU	Ali Emran Roslan
29	FW	BRU	Abdul Rahim Emran
30	GK	BRU	Ade Dzulkarnaen Awang

== Honours ==
- Brunei Premier League
  - Champions (1): 2014
