= IKLS-MB5 FC =

Bruneian soccer team

- Full name: Ikatan Kampong Lurong Sekuna - Mulaut Ban 5 Football Club
- Founded: 1988; 37 years ago
- Ground: Various
- Chairman: Ali Rahman Sulaiman
- Head coach: Ariffin Sulaiman

Ikatan Kampong Lurong Sekuna — Mulaut Ban 5 Football Club or simply IKLS-MB5 FC is a football club in Brunei. It takes its name from Kampong Lorong Sikuna in Peramu, Kampong Ayer, coupled with the Ban 5 section of Kampong Mulaut.

== History ==
Ikatan Kampong Lurong Sekuna or Lurong Sekuna Village Union is an association that has existed since the early 1970s. The football club of its members registered officially as a society in 1988 to take part in district-level competitions. They reached the quarterfinals of the Pepsi Cup in 2001 and played in the Bruneian lower levels of the football pyramid in the early 00s.

In 2012, IKLS reached the semifinals of the Brunei FA Cup all the way from the first round despite playing in the district league. They also managed to finish fifth from their group in the 2011–12 National Football League and was placed in the 2014 Brunei Premier League. They won promotion to the 2015 Brunei Super League after finishing in second place, but was immediately relegated by occupying the second to bottom spot in the top flight. Shortly after a merger with Mulaut Ban 5 FC in 2017, they enjoyed another promotion after finishing runners-up in the 2017 Brunei Premier League and they played in Brunei's top tier from 2018 until 2023.

On 31 July 2024, the club made an official statement that they are to withdraw from participating in the upcoming 2024–25 Brunei Super League.

== Current squad ==
As of 11 August 2023

Note: Flags indicate national team as defined under FIFA eligibility rules; some limited exceptions apply. Players may hold more than one non-FIFA nationality.

No.	Pos.	Nation	Player
1	GK	(Brunei) BRU	Nur Hilman Nor Hillmy
2	DF	(Brunei) BRU	Ahmad Hasbullah Alfiandiy
3	MF	(Brunei) BRU	Abdul Qayyum Irwan Rino
4	DF	(Brunei) BRU	Zakaria Metussin
5	DF	(Brunei) BRU	Zool Hasbemi Bahmin
6	MF	(Brunei) BRU	Sufri Hussin
7	FW	(Brunei) BRU	Dannysh Ashraff Wan Arzique Musyahadi Azizie Baharin
8	MF	(Brunei) BRU	Sharafiq Abdullah
9	FW	(Brunei) BRU	Syaherrul Affendy Syahmirul Nizam
10	FW	(Brunei) BRU	Qusyairi Arabimulfhasal
11	MF	(Brunei) BRU	Kurmin Bini (Captain)
12	MF	(Brunei) BRU	Hashim Zaini
13	FW	(Brunei) BRU	Haafizh Safri
14	DF	(Brunei) BRU	Nur Azees Ali

No.	Pos.	Nation	Player
15	FW	(Brunei) BRU	Abdul Aziz Hanafi Bakri
16	MF	(Brunei) BRU	Naqiuddin Abdullah Nordin
17	FW	(Brunei) BRU	Amirul Rasyid
18	FW	(Brunei) BRU	Alif Sahari
19	FW	(Brunei) BRU	Nor Hidayatullah Zaini
20	MF	(Brunei) BRU	Haziq Abdullah
21	MF	(Brunei) BRU	Hapidz Matalie
22	MF	(Brunei) BRU	Iqbal Jasni
23	DF	(Brunei) BRU	Ahmad Hafiz Said
24	MF	(Brunei) BRU	Iman Asyrani Aslan
25	GK	(Brunei) BRU	Yaamin Yaziid Idrus
27	FW	(Brunei) BRU	Nazriuddin Ahmad
30	DF	(Brunei) BRU	Nur Izzuddin Yusof
