= Jerudong FC =

Bruneian football club

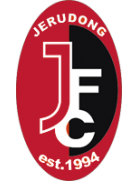
- Full name: Jerudong Football Club
- Founded: 1994; 32 years ago
- Ground: Jerudong Primary School Field
- Manager: Jalaludin Ghazali
- Coach: Julkifli Hitam
- League: Brunei Super League
- 2025–26: 8th
| Home colours | Away colours |

Jerudong Football Club (Malay: Kelab Bola Sepak Jerudong) is a Bruneian football club that are competing in the Brunei Super League, the highest tier in the Brunei football league system.

== History ==
Jerudong FC was founded in 1994, by Murni Mohammad and was started by a group of football players who viewed football as a way to help the young in their community. They had previously started out as local villagers. The membership then expanded beyond families and friends to include children of all ages. Players come from all skill levels, from absolute novices to those with prior experience competing in both youth and adult competitions.

Football was originally intended to provide a platform for adolescents to engage in more positive activities and stay away from activities that can be harmful to their wellbeing. A goal is to create a route to Brunei representative football. The club has produced numerous athletes, many of whom have left Jerudong FC to pursue their own interests both on and off the field.

Jerudong took part in the 2022 FA Cup, managing to qualify for the knockout phase but was defeated by eventual winners DPMM FC.

== Ground ==
The club’s primary playing and training facility is located at Jerudong Primary School Field, where the team trains up to three times a week in preparation for matches. Because of its long-term use o the field, the club maintains close connections with the local community. The field also serves as the club’s home ground.

== Current squad ==
As of 21 October 2026

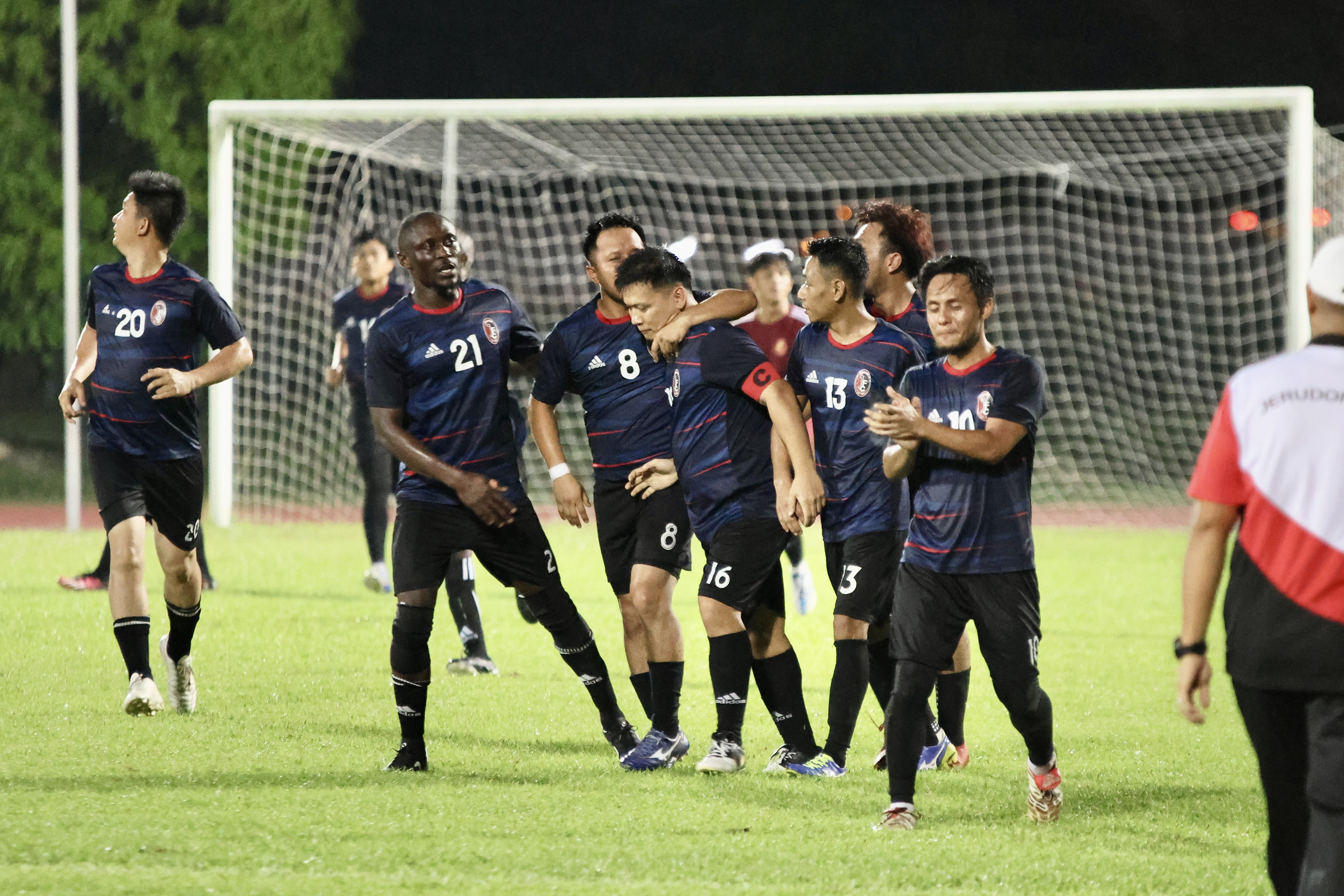
Players in celebration after Elisa Sabtu's goal against Lun Bawang during the 2023 Brunei Super League.

Note: Flags indicate national team as defined under FIFA eligibility rules; some limited exceptions apply. Players may hold more than one non-FIFA nationality.

| No. | Pos. | Nation | Player |
|---|---|---|---|
| 1 | GK | BRU | Romaino Maripa |
| 2 | FW | BRU | Nur Hidayat Abbas |
| 4 | DF | BRU | Abdul Azim Hassan |
| 6 | DF | BRU | Esmendy Brahim |
| 7 | MF | BRU | Sufian Lamudin |
| 8 | DF | IDN | Aji Kusuma |
| 9 | DF | BRU | Faezuddin Haris Nasution |
| 10 | MF | IDN | Hafid Abdul |
| 11 | FW | BRU | Nor Hidayatullah Zaini |
| 12 | DF | BRU | Noorsham Hajidin |
| 13 | DF | BRU | Farhan Kipla |
| 14 | MF | BRU | Nazirul Zulhilmi Anuar |
| 16 | FW | BRU | Abu Fayadh Fadhlullah Abu Kasim |
| 17 | DF | BRU | Helmi Wafiy Ammar Naim |
| 18 | DF | BRU | Syam Sulaimi Jamahat |

| No. | Pos. | Nation | Player |
|---|---|---|---|
| 19 | FW | GHA | Hakimi Abdullah @ Stephen Kyere Nyarko |
| 20 | DF | BRU | Khairol Nazrin Zamhari (Captain) |
| 21 | FW | BRU | Haziq Asahrin |
| 22 | GK | BRU | Khairul Nizam Jasni |
| 23 | GK | BRU | Sharil Hashim |
| 24 | FW | BRU | Fithratul Rahman Ratano |
| 25 | MF | BRU | Hidayatur Rahim Aliuddin |
| 26 | DF | BRU | Arif Adam |
| 27 | MF | BRU | Nor Alifullah Zaini |
| 28 | FW | BRU | Hafiy Firdaus Salleh |
| 29 | DF | BRU | Elisa Sabtu |
| 30 | FW | BRU | Amirul Hafizzan Puteh |
| — | DF | BRU | Hafizzudin Salleh |
| — | DF | BRU | Julremi Zaini |
| — | FW | IDN | Yansen Effendi |
