= 2012 Brunei FA Cup =

Tournament details
- Country: Brunei
- Dates: 10 June — 10 December 2012
- Teams: 44

Final positions
- Champions: MS ABDB (4th title)
- Runners-up: Indera FC

Tournament statistics
- Matches played: 43
- Goals scored: 198 (4.6 per match)

The 2012 Brunei FA Cup was the seventh edition of the Brunei FA Cup, the premier football knockout competition in Brunei. It was sponsored by telecommunications company DST and known as the DST FA Cup for sponsorship purposes. It began on 10 June 2012 and concluded with the final match on 10 December.

Organised by the National Football Association of Brunei Darussalam (NFABD), teams from the recently concluded Brunei National Football League as well as non-league clubs were able to register for the knockout competition with an entry fee of B$150.00. The prize pool includes B$4,000 for the victors and B$3,000 for the runners-up.

== Teams ==
A total of 44 teams took part in the competition. Players of all teams must be local or permanent residents of Brunei.

Brunei Super League clubs
Kilanas FC	Indera FC	Jerudong FC	LLRC FT
Majra United FC	MS ABDB	MS PDB	Najip FC
QAF FC	Wijaya FC		
Brunei Premier League clubs
BIBD SRC (Note: Withdrew from the Premier League by the time the 2014 season commenced)	BSRC FT	IKLS FC	Kota Ranger FC
Lun Bawang FC	Muara Vella FC	Perkasa FC	Rimba Star FC
Setia Perdana FC	Tunas FC		
Non-league teams
AKSE Bersatu	BESA FC	DSP United	Hijrah FC
Liverpool Supporters Club	Manggalela FC	MBS United	Menglait FC
Miisa United	MPK Sungai Matan	Persatuan Batang Mitus	Perda FC
FC Phosphor	Prisons Department	RBA FC	Rimba Star (Junior)
Sangsura FC	Seri Wira FC	Sewira FC	SMKERZ Club
Sporting FT	Sports School	STKRJ Lambak Kiri	T-Ripas FC

== Round and dates ==
Round	Date	Matches	Clubs	New entries this round
First round	10 June 2012	22	10 + 10 + 24 → 22	10 Brunei Super League; 10 Brunei Premier League; 24 non-league teams
Second round	16 October 2012	6	22 → 16	
Third round	24 October 2012	8	16 → 8	
Quarter-finals	9 November 2012	4	8 → 4	
Semi-finals	4 December 2012	2	4 → 2	
Final	10 December 2012	1	2 → Champions	
Total				44 clubs

== Results ==
=== First round ===
The draw for the first round was held on 6 June.

10 June 2012	MBS United	2–6	Rimba Star	Berakas
20:15 UTC+8	Hanis 3'; Nur Qhalid 70'	Report	Hamdi 2', 77'; Nur Syafiq 44', 66'; Khalil 64'; Qamarulludin 75'	Stadium: Berakas Sports Complex

12 June 2012	AKSE Bersatu	1–4	MS ABDB	Berakas
20:15 UTC+8	Daud 74'	Report	Haizul Rani 16'; Mazazizi 31' (pen.); Zairol 38'; Hardi 84'	Stadium: Track & Field Sports Complex

13 June 2012	SMKERZ Club	1–9	Tunas	Berakas
20:15 UTC+8	Abdul Wafi 87'	Report	Abdul Muiz 23', 33', 81'; Ahmad Radhey 66'; Faiz Farhan 71', 83', 86', 90'; Taqi 75'	Stadium: Berakas Sports Complex

15 June 2012	Manggalela	2–8	Setia Perdana	Berakas
16:00 UTC+8	Sallehuddin 5', 17'	Report	Rusydi Said 10'; Rahimni 27', 38'; Asrul 37', 85'; Azejar 57', 85'; Hafizuddin 74'	Stadium: Hassanal Bolkiah National Stadium

15 June 2012	Menglait	0–3	IKLS	Berakas
20:15 UTC+8		Report	Ariffin 23'; Azamain 40'; Mu'izzuddin 81' (o.g.)	Stadium: Berakas Sports Complex

19 June 2012	Majra	4–1	Seri Wira	Berakas
20:15 UTC+8	Noor Raimi 45'; Ikmal Hakim 52', 74'; Nor Sillmy 77'	Report	Khairul Huzaiemie 33'	Stadium: Berakas Sports Complex

19 June 2012	Sangsura	0–1	MPKSM	Berakas
20:15 UTC+8				Stadium: Track & Field Sports Complex

24 June 2012	Kilanas	3–0	Rimba Star (Junior)	Berakas
16:00 UTC+8	Khairul; Naasiruddeen; Izzul Wazien	Report		Stadium: Track & Field Sports Complex

26 June 2012	Prisons Dept	3–0	RBA	Berakas
20:15 UTC+8				Stadium: Track & Field Sports Complex

29 June 2012	Jerudong	4–1	Wijaya	Berakas
16:00 UTC+8				Stadium: Hassanal Bolkiah National Stadium

29 June 2012	Muara Vella	3–0	Kota Ranger	Berakas
20:15 UTC+8				Stadium: Berakas Sports Complex

30 June 2012	Sports School	0–2	QAF	Berakas
20:15 UTC+8		Report	Hardyman 11'; Hafis 69'	Stadium: Track & Field Sports Complex

1 July 2012	Sporting	3–1	Perkasa	Berakas
16:00 UTC+8	Hasmee 15', 69' (pen.); Hardiman 68'	Report	Saifuni 37'	Stadium: Track & Field Sports Complex

2 July 2012	Indera	2–1	DSP United	Berakas
20:15 UTC+8	Reduan 50'; Khairul Anwar 82'	Report	Azmil 32''	Stadium: Berakas Sports Complex

3 July 2012	Phosphor	0–2	MS PDB	Berakas
20:15 UTC+8		Report	Syarafuddin 18'; Jasriman 75'	Stadium: Track & Field Sports Complex

6 July 2012	Miisa United	0–3	Najip	Berakas
16:00 UTC+8		Report	Asril 61'; Ali Shofian 65'; Sumardi 88'	Stadium: Hassanal Bolkiah National Stadium

6 July 2012	Perda	2–3	Sewira	Berakas
20:15 UTC+8				Stadium: Berakas Sports Complex

7 July 2012	BESA	3–1	Liverpool SC	Berakas
20:15 UTC+8	Norhafiz 4'; Firdaus 80'; Aqqimul 90'	Report	Hilfi 85'	Stadium: Track & Field Sports Complex

7 July 2012	T-Ripas	0–4	Hijrah	Berakas
20:15 UTC+8		Report	Faizal; Mat Zidi	Stadium: Berakas Sports Complex

10 July 2012	STKRJ L. Kiri	1–6	BSRC	Berakas
20:15 UTC+8	Kamarul Zaman 73'	Report	Wirairja 24'; Faizul 43'; Azizul Syafiee 45'; Junaidi 46', 59'; Syazwi 89'	Stadium: Berakas Sports Complex

13 July 2012	Lun Bawang	4–0	Batang Mitus	Berakas
16:00 UTC+8	Eliazar 38'; Delson 39', 42'; Idris 78'	Report		Stadium: Hassanal Bolkiah National Stadium

13 July 2012	LLRC	4–1	BIBD	Berakas
20:15 UTC+8				Stadium: Hassanal Bolkiah National Stadium

=== Second round ===
The second round began on 16 October, played by 12 teams. The remaining 10 teams that advanced from the first round received byes to the third round: BESA, Indera, Jerudong, Kilanas, LLRC, Majra, MS PDB, Prisons Department, Rimba Star, Sporting FT.

16 October 2012	BSRC	3–0	Hijrah	Berakas
20:00 UTC+8				Stadium: Track & Field Sports Complex

20 October 2012	QAF	0–2	MS ABDB	Berakas
20:00 UTC+8		Report	Safri 51'; Nur Ikhmal 78'	Stadium: Berakas Sports Complex

20 October 2012	IKLS	15–0	MPKSM	Berakas
20:00 UTC+8				Stadium: Track & Field Sports Complex

21 October 2012	Najip	2–2 (5–6 p)	Setia Perdana	Berakas
20:00 UTC+8	Sahrul 26'; Huzaimi 59'	Report	Omar Ali 25', 51'	Stadium: Berakas Sports Complex

28 October 2012	Tunas	5–1	Lun Bawang	Berakas
16:00 UTC+8				Stadium: Track & Field Sports Complex

4 November 2012	Sewira	0–6	Muara Vella	Berakas
20:00 UTC+8			Muqaddem 12' (pen.), 43'; Zakeus 17'; Aminuddin 20'; Fadillah 70' (o.g.); Abdul Azim 90+2'	Stadium: Berakas Sports Complex

=== Third round ===
The third round was held from 24 October to 18 November, with the match on 31 October between LLRC FT and Setia Perdana restarted to the latter date due to bad weather.

24 October 2012	Majra	4–3	BSRC	Berakas
20:00 UTC+8	Azri 42', 87'; Faizal 71', 73'	Report	Syazwi 22', 60'; Junaidi 36' (pen.)	Stadium: Berakas Sports Complex

29 October 2012	Jerudong	1–2	IKLS	Berakas
20:00 UTC+8	Asmadi 49' (pen.)	Report	Fakhrul 64'; Ateraba 81'	Stadium: Track & Field Sports Complex

30 October 2012	BESA	1–5	Kilanas	Berakas
20:00 UTC+8	Aliakbar 88'	Report	Azmi 6'; Naasiruddeen 22'; Syazwan 29'; Nor Hidayatullah 31'; Khairul 73' (pen.)	Stadium: Track & Field Sports Complex

3 November 2012	Prisons Dept	1–4	Indera	Berakas
20:00 UTC+8	Akob 66'	Report	Nurikhwan 35'; Hamizan 60', 80'; Azwan 85'	Stadium: Track & Field Sports Complex

5 November 2012	Rimba Star	2–3	Tunas	Berakas
20:00 UTC+8			Faiz Farhan; Azril; Nazirul Hadi	Stadium: Berakas Sports Complex

5 November 2012	Sporting	0–1	MS ABDB	Berakas
20:00 UTC+8		Report	Safri 78'	Stadium: Track & Field Sports Complex

9 November 2012	MS PDB	3–1	Muara Vella	Berakas
20:00 UTC+8	Rosmini 62'; Khalid 62'; Hisam 82'	Report	Aminuddin 46'	Stadium: Berakas Sports Complex

18 November 2012 (Note: Originally played on 31 October the game was postponed in the 58th minute due to heavy rain, and replayed on the 18 November.)	LLRC	6–2	Setia Perdana	Berakas
20:00 UTC+8				Stadium: Track & Field Sports Complex

=== Quarter-finals ===
9 November 2012	Majra	1–3	MS ABDB	Berakas
16:00 UTC+8	Julremi 71'	Report	Mazazizi 55'; Baharin 60'; Affendy 72'	Stadium: Hassanal Bolkiah National Stadium

25 November 2012	Tunas	0–1	IKLS	Berakas
20:00 UTC+8		Report	Abdul Halim 19'	Stadium: Hassanal Bolkiah National Stadium

27 November 2012	Indera	5–3	LLRC	Berakas
20:00 UTC+8	Hamizan 10'; Azwan 54', 90'; Nazirul 80'; Khayrun 87'	Report	Safuan 27' (pen.), 34'; Shah Hafiz 56'	Stadium: Hassanal Bolkiah National Stadium

30 November 2012	MS PDB	2–0 (a.e.t.)	Kilanas	Berakas
20:00 UTC+8	Syarafuddin 96'; Huzairol 120'	Report		Stadium: Hassanal Bolkiah National Stadium

=== Semi-finals ===
4 December 2012	MS ABDB	3–1	IKLS	Berakas
20:00 UTC+8	Mazazizi 19'; Khairul Mee 45'; Budiman 71'	Report	Ateraba 79'	Stadium: Hassanal Bolkiah National Stadium

5 December 2012	Indera	2–2 (5–3 p)	MS PDB	Berakas
20:00 UTC+8	Hamizan 1'; Khayrun 4'	Report	Zulkhairi 15'; Fazizzul 33'	Stadium: Hassanal Bolkiah National Stadium

=== Final ===
10 December 2012	MS ABDB	1–0 (a.e.t.)	Indera	Berakas
20:00 UTC+8	Hardi 115'	Report		Stadium: Hassanal Bolkiah National Stadium
