= Hamizan Aziz Sulaiman =

Bruneian footballer

Hamizan Aziz
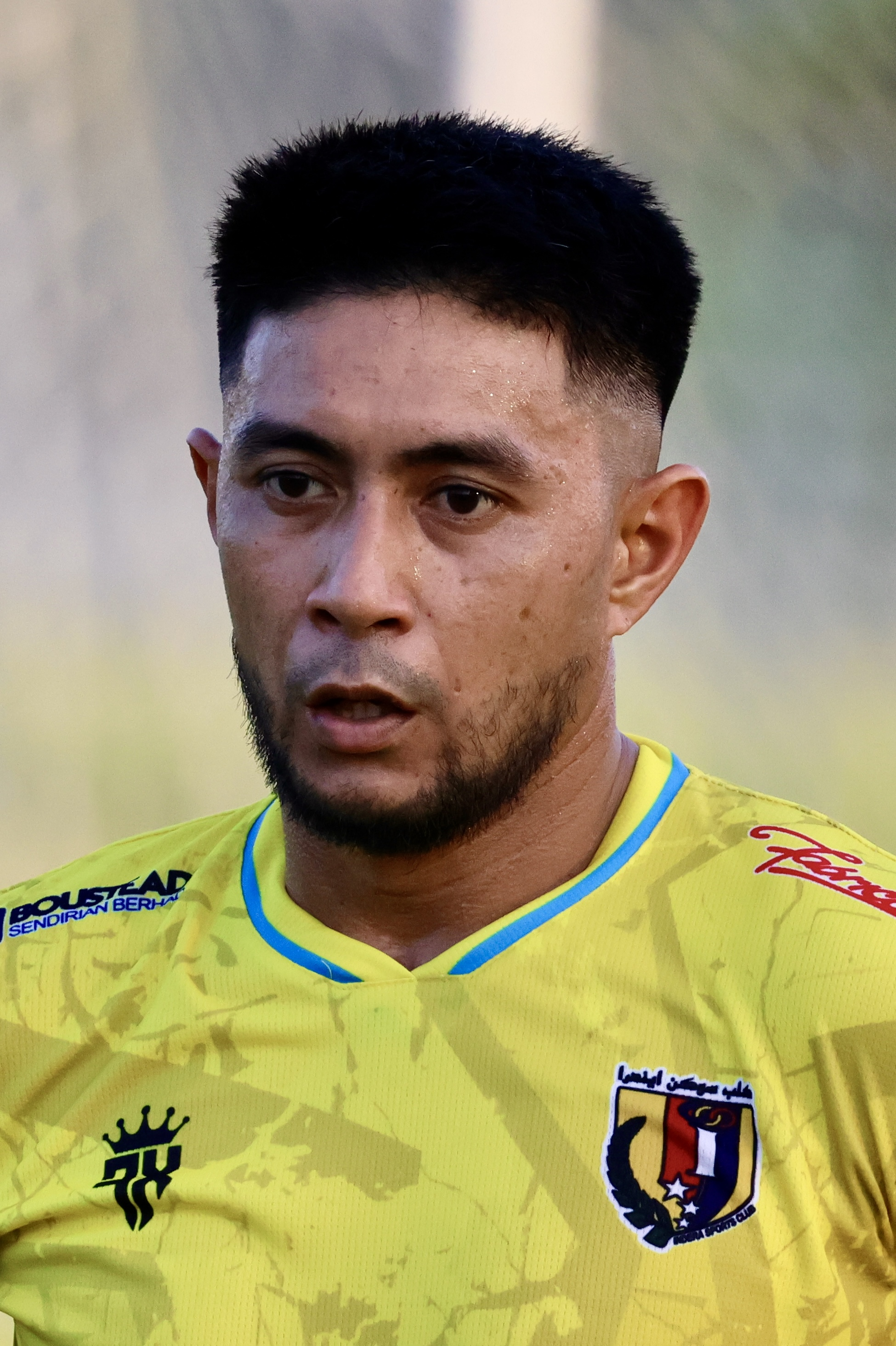
- Hamizan with Indera in 2024

Personal information
- Full name: Hamizan Aziz bin Sulaiman
- Date of birth: 24 January 1989 (age 37)
- Place of birth: Brunei
- Height: 1.63 m (5 ft 4 in)
- Position: Striker

Team information
- Current team: BSRC FC
- Number: 11

Senior career*
Years	Team	Apps	(Gls)
2007–2011	QAF		
2011–2025	Indera		(77)
2025–	BSRC	1	(0)

International career^{‡}
2005–2007	Brunei U20		
2011	Brunei U23	4	(0)
2009–2023	Brunei	9	(0)
- * Club domestic league appearances and goals as of 19 September 2025 ‡ National team caps and goals as of 5 November 2022

Hamizan Aziz bin Sulaiman (born 24 January 1989) is a Bruneian footballer who plays as a striker for BSRC FC of the Brunei Super League.

== Club career ==
Hamizan started his career with QAF FC where he won the championship twice in the 2007–08 and 2008–09 seasons, as well as the Brunei League Cup in 2008 and 2009. He left QAF for Indera FC in 2011 and scored his first goal for the club against Majra FC in a 1–1 draw in the abandoned 2011 Brunei Premier League.

After scoring 17 goals in the 8-team group stage of the 2011–12 Brunei National Football League, he contributed 13 to Indera's league triumph in the inaugural 2012–13 Brunei Super League, four goals behind top scorer and teammate Azwan Ali Rahman who moved to DPMM FC immediately afterwards. Astoundingly, eight of them came in the 20–1 win against Najip FC on 26 January 2013.

In the 2014 season Hamizan scored six goals and Indera retained the championship with two games to spare. A year later saw MS ABDB wrestle the title away from Indera but Hamizan still registered a commendable eleven goals for the campaign. Silverware would not come to Indera until 1 April 2018 when they beat MS PDB in the final of the 2017–18 Brunei FA Cup, although Hamizan was sidelined through injury for a good portion of the campaign.

In the 2018–19 Brunei Super League season, Indera finished fourth in the table but qualified for the 2020 AFC Cup as the only Bruneian club that had applied for an AFC Club Licence. They played Yangon United in a two-legged play-off in January 2020 and was eliminated from the competition 9–2 on aggregate.

== International career ==
Hamizan made appearances for the Brunei under-20 team that competed at the 2005 and 2007 editions of the AFF U-20 Youth Championship. He also represented Brunei at the 26th SEA Games in Jakarta, Indonesia in November 2011. He played four games in total where in the fourth group game against Vietnam, he was sent off for a second yellow card while Brunei were already 0–8 down.

Hamizan made his full international debut against hosts Sri Lanka in a 5–1 defeat at the 2010 AFC Challenge Cup qualification held in April 2009. The whole team was represented by QAF FC for the whole tournament and Hamizan also featured in the other games, including a 0–6 drubbing by Pakistan and a 5–0 loss against Chinese Taipei. It would be three years until Hamizan and the Wasps would play another international match due to a suspension imposed by FIFA the following September. That match would be a friendly against Indonesia on 25 September 2012 in Bandar Seri Begawan which the visitors would win 0–5.

Hamizan was selected for the following 2012 AFF Suzuki Cup qualification tournament held in Myanmar in early October 2012. He featured once as a substitute against Cambodia in a 2–3 victory. Defeats to eventual qualified teams Myanmar and Laos ended the Wasps' hopes of qualifying despite registering two wins in the five-team tournament.

Barring a friendly 5–0 defeat away against Singapore in July 2015, Hamizan had few chances in the national team setup until 2018 when he was selected for the two-legged 2018 AFF Championship qualification matches against Timor-Leste. After a 3–1 defeat in Kuala Lumpur as the designated away team, Hamizan was brought on late in the game for Faiq Bolkiah in the second leg at the Hassanal Bolkiah National Stadium as Brunei needed a single goal to qualify on away goals after Najib Tarif scored, which unfortunately did not come.

Hamizan's next appearance was against the Maldives at home in a friendly on 21 September 2022 in a 0–3 loss. Nevertheless, he was kept by Mario Rivera for the 2022 AFF Championship qualification matches to be held in Brunei in November the same year. He featured from the starting lineup in the first leg which was a 6–2 victory and helped the Wasps qualify for the tournament proper for only the second time ever.

Selected for the 2022 AFF Mitsubishi Electric Cup that December, Hamizan started the games against Thailand and Cambodia, which ended in heavy defeats. Brunei registered four losses in as many games for the tournament.

== Honours ==
=== Team ===
QAF FC

- Brunei Premier League (2): 2007–08, 2008–09
- Brunei League Cup: 2008, 2009

Indera SC

- Brunei Super League (2): 2012–13, 2014
- Brunei FA Cup: 2017–18

=== Individual ===
- Brunei Premier League Young Player of the Year: 2007–08
