= Shah Azahar Abdullah Ahar =

Bruneian footballer

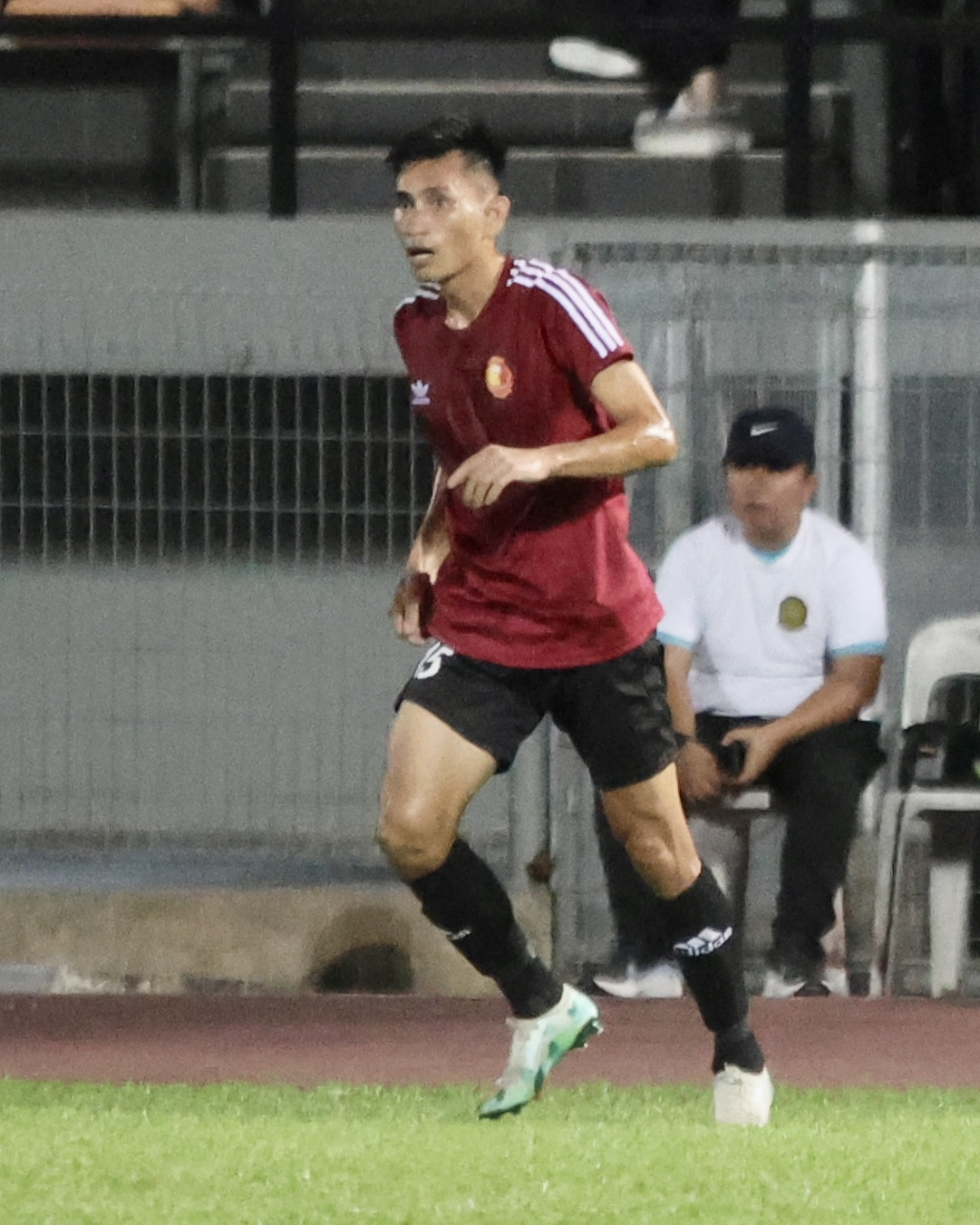
- Shah Azahar with Lun Bawang in 2023.

Personal information
- Full name: Mohammad Shah Azahar bin Abdullah Ahar @ Philip Anak Ahar
- Date of birth: 11 December 1983 (age 42)
- Place of birth: Temburong, Brunei
- Position: Defender

Senior career*
Years	Team	Apps	(Gls)
2006–2014	QAF FC		
2015	Jerudong FC		
2016–2017	Wijaya FC		
2021–2022	Wijaya FC		
2023	Lun Bawang	9	(2)
2024	Kota Ranger	4	(0)

International career^{‡}
2006–2015	Brunei	5	(0)
- * Club domestic league appearances and goals as of 1 October 2025 ‡ National team caps and goals as of 16 January 2019

Mohammad Shah Azahar bin Abdullah Ahar, formerly known as Philip Anak Ahar (born 11 December 1983) is a Bruneian former footballer of Iban descent who played as a defender.

== Club career ==
Philip, as he was previously known, started playing club football with QAF FC of the B-League Premier 1 in the 2005–06 season as an employee of Ben Foods (B), a company under the QAF corporation. His club won the Bruneian league championship for three consecutive seasons while he was there.

Shah Azahar joined Jerudong FC once QAF FC waived entry into the 2015 Brunei Super League, along with many of his QAF teammates. He moved again to Wijaya FC for the following 2016 season.

After several years off the pitch to focus on his running career, Shah Azahar rejoined Wijaya in June 2021. He subsequently turned out for Lun Bawang FC and finally Kota Ranger FC in 2024.

== International career ==
While still known as Philip Anak Ahar, he made his first foray into the international scene with Brunei at the 2006 AFC Challenge Cup held in Bangladesh. He made his debut and only appearance as a late substitute in the 2–1 win over Nepal on 4 April. His next tournament was the 2010 AFC Challenge Cup qualification in which he played two games out of three, all as substitute.

After solid displays with Jerudong FC, Shah Azahar was recalled into the international fold in mid-2015, taking the field in friendly games against Singapore and Cambodia.

== Honours ==
=== Team ===
QAF FC

- Brunei Premier League (3): 2005–06, 2007–08, 2009–10
- Brunei League Cup (2): 2008, 2009

== Personal life ==
Besides football, Shah Azahar is also a long-distance runner who has finished in first place at many locally-held events. Hailing from a family of runners, his eldest brother Sefli is a celebrated Bruneian marathon runner, while his elder brother Jimmy represented Brunei at the 2004 Summer Olympics for the men's 1500 metres on top of having played league football with MS PDB.

Shah Azahar embraced Islam and changed his name from Philip circa 2010.
