= Fakhrul Zulhazmi Yussof =

Bruneian footballer

Fakhrul Zulhazmi
Personal information
- Full name: Muhammad Fakhrul Zulhazmi bin Yussof
- Date of birth: 5 March 1991 (age 35)
- Place of birth: Brunei
- Height: 1.75 m (5 ft 9 in)
- Position: Goalkeeper

Youth career
- Majra FC

Senior career*
Years	Team	Apps	(Gls)
2009–2010	Brunei Youth Team		(1)
2011	Majra FC		(0)
2012–2013	DPMM FC	1	(0)
2014–2017	Indera SC		(0)

International career^{‡}
2011–2013	Brunei U21	6	(0)
2012–2015	Brunei	2	(0)
2013	Brunei U23	1	(0)
- * Club domestic league appearances and goals as of 7 November 2017 ‡ National team caps and goals as of 12 July 2017

Muhammad Fakhrul Zulhazmi bin Yussof (born 5 March 1991) is a Bruneian former footballer who played as a goalkeeper. He has played for the Brunei national football team on two occasions.

== Club career ==
Fakhrul is a shot-stopper with an eccentric streak, being able to take outfield free-kicks and penalties in the mould of Chilavert and Rogério Ceni. He started his football career with the youth team of Majra FC and was selected to play for Brunei Youth Team, a national under-16 team that competed in the league's second tier. On 16 January 2010, he became the first goalkeeper to score in the Brunei leagues when he converted an equalising penalty in an eventual 3–1 loss against LLRC FT.

Fakhrul was back in Majra's colours after the abandoned 2011 season. His heroic performances at the 2012 Hassanal Bolkiah Trophy instigated Brunei's only professional club DPMM FC to acquire his services. He signed full terms alongside fellow HBT winners Adi Said, Hendra Azam and Najib Tarif on 4 April 2012. He altogether spent two seasons in the S.League with DPMM, making his sole appearance as a half-time substitute in a 4–0 victory against Tanjong Pagar United on 23 September 2012. He was released after the 2013 season without making any further appearances.

Fakhrul joined Indera SC at the start of the 2014 Brunei Super League and was a huge influence as his team dropped only five points to win the title. However midway into the following season, he began to miss games for personal reasons which greatly affected Indera's chances to retain the title. He was last with the club in 2017.

He played for the futsal team of Kasuka & Ar Rawda in 2022. His team won the 2022 Piala Keputeraan title that September.

== International career ==
Fakhrul was once the undisputed starting goalkeeper at his national youth team age group. Remnants of Brunei Youth Team formed the under-21 side to contest the 2012 Hassanal Bolkiah Trophy, a youth tournament hosted by Brunei for ASEAN countries. Coached by South Korean Kwon Oh-son, the team won silver for football at the 2011 Borneo Games in Samarinda, Indonesia.

At the HBT tournament proper in February 2012, Fakhrul started every game en route to the final, keeping clean sheets against Malaysia and Timor-Leste in the group stages. A 3−2 win against Myanmar paved the way to a final against Indonesia in 9 March. On that day, Fakhrul successfully kept out the tournament's top-scorer Andik Vermansyah et al. to bring silverware to the Young Wasps on home ground.

Fakhrul received his first call-up to the full national team for the 2012 AFF Suzuki Cup qualification matches to be held in Myanmar in October 2012. He won his first international cap at a friendly in Bandar Seri Begawan against Indonesia on 26 September 2012. He was replaced by fellow debutant Suhandi Mahali after 75 minutes, but not before letting in five unanswered goals. He played no part in the ensuing qualification matches, where Brunei showed their best performance ever in AFF Championship qualification by gaining six points despite failing to qualify.

Fakhrul was slated to play for the Brunei under-23s at the 27th SEA Games held in Myanmar in December 2013. On 15 August 2013, he played in an official friendly match against Indonesia U23 held in Jakarta which finished 1−0 to the home side. However he suffered a broken finger at a November tour of Thailand which kept him out of the SEA Games.

Fakhrul was initially picked for the 2014 Hassanal Bolkiah Trophy as one of the five permitted overage players, but was dropped after pleading guilty of robbery charges in July 2014. Ironically, he carried out his misdemeanor just days after making an appearance for the team at a kit sponsorship unveiling ceremony.

Fakhrul's club form for Indera SC instigated a national team recall for an away friendly against Singapore on 6 June 2015, but by the next friendly in November he was out of contention due to his personal issues.

== Honours ==
=== Club ===
Majra FC

- Brunei League Cup: 2011

DPMM FC

- Singapore League Cup: 2012

Indera SC

- Brunei Super League: 2014

Kasuka & Ar Rawda

- Piala Keputeraan: 2022

=== International ===
Brunei national under-21 football team

- Hassanal Bolkiah Trophy: 2012

=== Individual ===
- ASEAN All-Stars: 2014

=== Order ===
- Meritorius Service Medal (PJK; 2012)
