= Suhandi Mahali =

Bruneian footballer

Suhandi
Personal information
- Full name: Muhammad Suhandi bin Haji Awang Mahali
- Date of birth: 4 May 1985 (age 41)
- Place of birth: Brunei
- Height: 1.81 m (5 ft 11 in)
- Position: Goalkeeper

Senior career*
Years	Team	Apps	(Gls)
2004–2008	QAF		
2008–2014	MS ABDB		(1)
2015	DPMM	0	(0)
2016–2018	MS ABDB	4	(0)

International career
2012	Brunei	1	(0)
- * Club domestic league appearances and goals

Soldadu Muhammad Suhandi bin Haji Awang Mahali (born 4 May 1985) is a Bruneian former footballer who played as a goalkeeper. He is a five-time Brunei FA Cup winner and a member of ABDB's championship squad on two occasions.

== Club career ==
Suhandi was part of the QAF FC squad in 2004. He started playing for the football team of his employers the Brunei army in 2008. He won the majority of his FA Cup medals in his early years while competing the goalkeeper spot with Tarmizi Johari, but they were luckless in the league that was dominated by QAF FC and later Indera SC.

On 1 February 2013, Suhandi scored a penalty in the 82nd minute in the 2012–13 Brunei Super League game against Najip FC which finished 11–1 to MS ABDB. This made Suhandi the third goalkeeper to score a goal in a league fixture in Brunei, after Fakhrul Zulhazmi Yussof and Mu'izzuddin Ismail.

MS ABDB started the 2014 Brunei Super League with a 3–2 loss to LLRC FT on 2 February. Days later Tarmizi Johari, who had started the game, signed a professional contract with DPMM FC, enabling Suhandi to become the starting goalkeeper for the Armymen. In his third league match, he let a free kick by Syarafuddin Hamdi Talip slip between his legs in a 0–1 reverse at the hands of MS PDB. These two defeats along with another loss to eventual champions Indera SC a month later would cost ABDB the title with Suhandi only keeping five clean sheets in 15 appearances. (Another clean sheet was attributed to Zulfadhli Matassan as Suhandi served a suspension for a red card against Majra FC.)

At the start of the 2015 season Suhandi found himself replacing Tarmizi as the third-choice keeper behind Wardun Yussof and Azman Ilham Noor in the DPMM ranks. This turned into an uneventful stint for Suhandi, failing to make a single appearance even on the bench, while back at ABDB Tarmizi managed to finally win the league with only four points dropped in the 2015 Brunei Super League. Suhandi was released from DPMM in early 2016 along with Amalul Said.

Suhandi returned to the MS ABDB ranks in late 2016, but by that time there were already three keepers in the squad along with the signing of former youth international Burhanuddin Edy Asmady earlier in the year. Nevertheless, he managed to appear in four matches for the 2017–18 season (another title-winning season for MS ABDB) before being deregistered soon after.

== International career ==
Suhandi made his international debut for the Brunei national team as a substitute on 26 September 2012 against Indonesia national football team in a 5–0 loss, playing the last 15 minutes of the game. He was listed by the Wasps for the 2012 AFF Championship qualification matches in the following month, but did not make the cut.

== Honours ==
MS ABDB

- Brunei Super League (2): 2016, 2017–18
- Brunei FA Cup (5): 2007–08, 2010, 2012–13, 2014–15, 2016
