= Viban Francis Bayong =

Cameroonian former footballer

Viban Bayong
Personal information
- Full name: Viban Francis Bayong
- Date of birth: 28 December 1975 (age 50)
- Place of birth: Cameroon
- Position: Striker

Senior career*
Years	Team	Apps	(Gls)
- Sable FC
2002	Dinamo Zagreb		
2004	Brunei		(8)
2005–2010	QAF FC		(70)
2006–2007	→ DPMM FC (loan)	4	(4)
- * Club domestic league appearances and goals as of 11 July 2018

Viban Francis Bayong (born 28 December 1975) is a Cameroonian former footballer who last played for QAF of the Brunei Super League in 2010. He was top scorer for three consecutive seasons in the Brunei Premier League.

== Career ==
Bayong was a player for Sable FC and was also reported to have been signed by Dinamo Zagreb before arriving in Brunei in 2004. He played for the Brunei representative side in the second tier of the Malaysian league for one season, making his debut against Johor FC in a 2–1 away defeat on 4 April. He scored a 15-minute hat-trick against PDRM FA on 20 June. He bagged a total of 8 goals for the Wasps, behind Silas Liberato da Silva with 11.

QAF FC signed Bayong at the start of the 2005–06 Brunei Premier League season. He scored 33 goals to finish as top scorer in the league, two of the goals coming in the deciding game for the championship, a 2–3 win over MS ABDB in the penultimate round. He also scored five goals in a 12–3 mauling of March United in the FA Cup, although they were knocked out by their armymen rivals through penalties in the following round.

With no league action for QAF until November 2007, both Bayong and Japanese playmaker Dan Ito were loaned to DPMM FC at the start of the 2006–07 Malaysia Super League, whom despite gaining promotion to the Super League were struggling to fill their import quota after the exit of Rodrigo Tosi and Mladen Alajbeg. He made his Malaysian league return after three years by scoring against Pulau Pinang after coming on as a substitute on 20 December. With the loan deal ended after one month, Bayong contributed four goals in four games altogether in a stellar season for DPMM and helped them reach third place at the conclusion of the league.

Bayong and QAF were losing finalists to ABDB for the 2006 Brunei League Cup. With both clubs fighting for the 2007-08 championship which began in late 2007, QAF lost the league fixture 0–3 to ABDB on 2 January. Bayong's club then rallied to end the season without dropping anymore points, while a shock loss to Indera FC after a draw with AH United left the armymen trailing in second place. QAF managed to hold ABDB to a 2–2 draw in the final game of the season to retain their crown. Bayong and Budiman Jumat of ABDB were joint-top scorers of the league with 18 goals each.

Bayong's last campaign for QAF FC was the 2009–10 Brunei Premier League, when afterwards hiring import players were forbidden in the following season. Thanks to his goals QAF were unbeaten in the league up until the 17th league match on 16 February 2010 when his brace to down AH United 0–2 clinched their third successive title. He also lifted the League Cup the previous November. Two losses to MS ABDB took off the gloss of his swansong: the final game of the season ended QAF's 34-game unbeaten run, and the year's FA Cup final also went to the armymen despite his goal taking the match to 2–1 in the 61st minute.

== Conviction ==
Bayong and his wife were indicted for multiple accounts of people smuggling among other charges in 2015. They were both found guilty in summer 2017, with Bayong being sentenced to five years and four months' jail or one months' jail in default of fine payment. The Cameroonian then appealed to the Bruneian court later that year but it was rejected.

== Honours ==
=== Team ===
QAF FC

- Brunei Premier League (3): 2005–06, 2007–08, 2009–10
- Brunei League Cup (2): 2008, 2009

=== Individual ===
- 2005–06 Brunei Premier League top scorer - 33 goals
- 2007–08 Brunei Premier League top scorer - 18 goals (shared with Budiman Jumat)
- 2009–10 Brunei Premier League top scorer - 19 goals
