= Aqmal Hakeem Abdul Hamid =

Bruneian footballer

Aqmal Hakeem
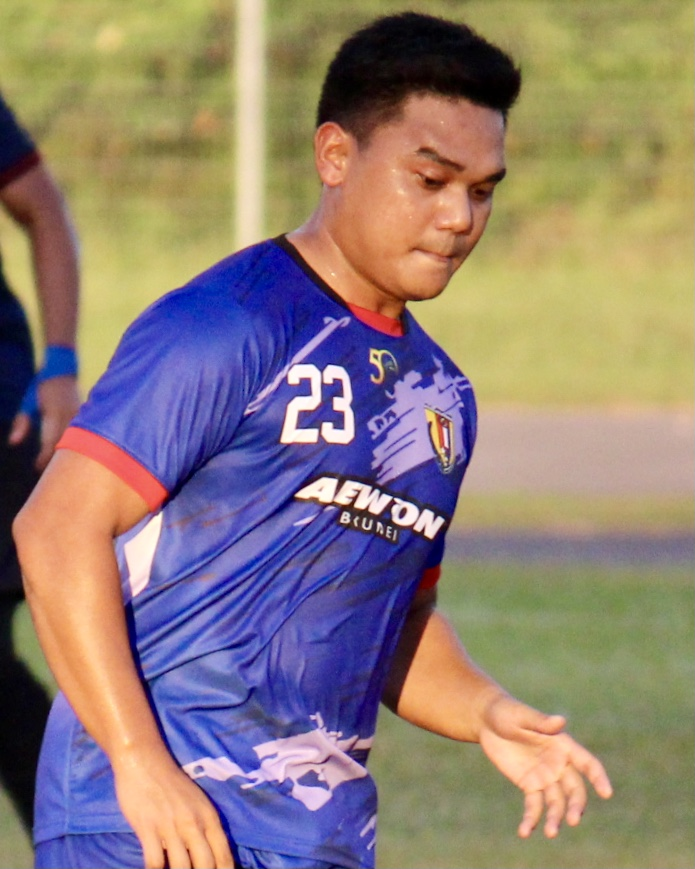
- Aqmal in 2022

Personal information
- Full name: Muhamad Aqmal Hakeem bin Abdul Hamid
- Date of birth: 14 November 1990 (age 35)
- Place of birth: Brunei
- Height: 1.63 m (5 ft 4 in)
- Positions: Midfielder; forward

Youth career
- 2003–2008: Sports School

Senior career*
| Years | Team | Apps | (Gls) |
| 2008 | AH United | | |
| 2009–2011 | QAF | | (3) |
| 2011–2014 | Indera | | (7) |
| 2018–2022 | Indera | | |

International career^{‡}
| 2009 | Brunei | 3 | (0) |
| 2012 | Brunei U21 | 1 | (0) |
| 2013 | Brunei U23 | 4 | (0) |
- * Club domestic league appearances and goals as of 27 March 2023 ‡ National team caps and goals as of 25 October 2018

Muhamad Aqmal Hakeem bin Abdul Hamid (born 14 November 1990) is a Bruneian footballer who plays as a midfielder or forward. He has won two league championships with Indera and previously QAF FC. He also made three appearances for the Brunei national football team in 2009.

== Club career ==
Aqmal was one of the first students who enrolled for Brunei's Sports School when it first opened in 2003. He first played for AH United after he graduated. Then he joined defending league champions QAF FC for the 2009–10 Brunei Premier League, scoring three times and contributing to QAF's third straight league title. He joined Indera SC in 2011 and stayed there until early 2014, winning the inaugural Brunei Super League in the 2012–13 season.

After a four-year hiatus, Aqmal returned to the pitch for Indera at the start of the 2018 Brunei Super League.

== International career ==
As a member of QAF FC, Aqmal had the opportunity to represent the Brunei national football team at the 2010 AFC Challenge Cup qualification matches held in Sri Lanka in April 2009. He played in all of the three matches against Sri Lanka, Pakistan and Chinese Taipei, losing each time.

Three years later, Aqmal was a squad member of the Brunei under-21 side that won the 2012 Hassanal Bolkiah Trophy, appearing once against Timor-Leste.

Aqmal represented Brunei at the 27th SEA Games hosted by Myanmar in December the following year. He played in all four group matches in a disappointing campaign for the Young Wasps, finishing with zero points.

== Honours ==
=== Team ===
QAF FC

- Brunei Premier League: 2009–10

Indera SC

- Brunei Super League: 2012–13

Brunei U21

- Hassanal Bolkiah Trophy: 2012

=== Individual ===
- Meritorious Service Medal (PJK; 2012)
