= Riwandi Wahit =

Bruneian footballer

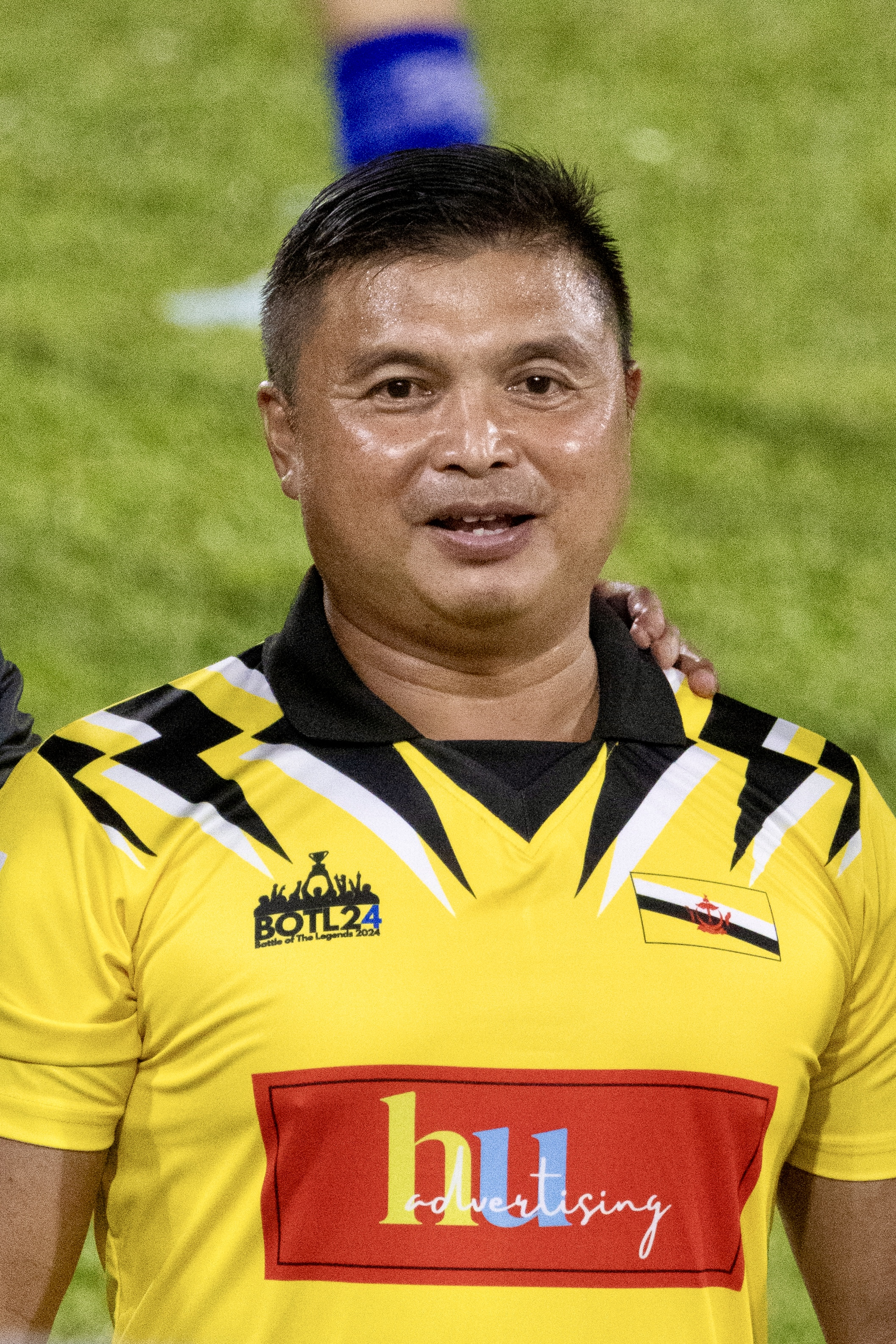
- Riwandi in 2024

Personal information
- Full name: Riwandi bin Wahit
- Date of birth: 6 March 1981 (age 45)
- Place of birth: Batu Marang, Brunei
- Height: 1.76 m (5 ft 9 1/2 in)
- Position: Striker

Senior career*
Years	Team	Apps	(Gls)
1999–2003	Brunei		
2003–2014	QAF		
2019	Najip		

International career^{‡}
2001	Brunei U23	2	(0)
1999–2009	Brunei	15	(2)
- * Club domestic league appearances and goals as of 12 July 2019 ‡ National team caps and goals as of 23 January 2017

Riwandi bin Wahit (born 6 March 1981) is a Bruneian former footballer who played as a striker. He previously played for QAF FC for more than a decade.

== Club career ==
Riwandi began his career with the Bruneian representative team playing in the Malaysian league system, starting in 1999 with the team that won the Malaysia Cup that year. He moved to Brunei's domestic league with newly formed QAF FC in 2003, entering the B-League in its second season. Appointed as captain in 2006, his last season with the club came in 2014, from whereafter the club decided not to remain playing in the Brunei Super League. By that time, he had won the league three times and the Brunei League Cup twice.

== International career ==
Riwandi made his international debut for Brunei on 6 August 1999, coming on as a substitute in a 0–2 loss to Malaysia in the third group game at the 1999 SEA Games held in his home country. He made a total of 13 appearances for the Wasps, captaining Brunei for the three occasions that his club side QAF FC was representing the national team.

== International goals ==
Goal	Date	Venue	Opponent	Score	Result	Competition
1.	4 April 2006	MA Aziz Stadium, Chittagong, Bangladesh	Nepal	2–0	2–1	2006 AFC Challenge Cup
2.	18 November 2006	Panaad Stadium, Bacolod, Philippines	Laos	1–2	1–4	2007 AFF Championship qualification

== Honours ==
=== Team ===
Brunei M-League Team

- Malaysia Cup: 1999

QAF FC

- Brunei Premier League (3): 2005–06, 2007–08, 2009–10
- Brunei League Cup (2): 2008, 2009

=== Individual ===
- Meritorious Service Medal (PJK) (1999)
