= Hendra Azam Idris =

Bruneian footballer

Hendra Azam
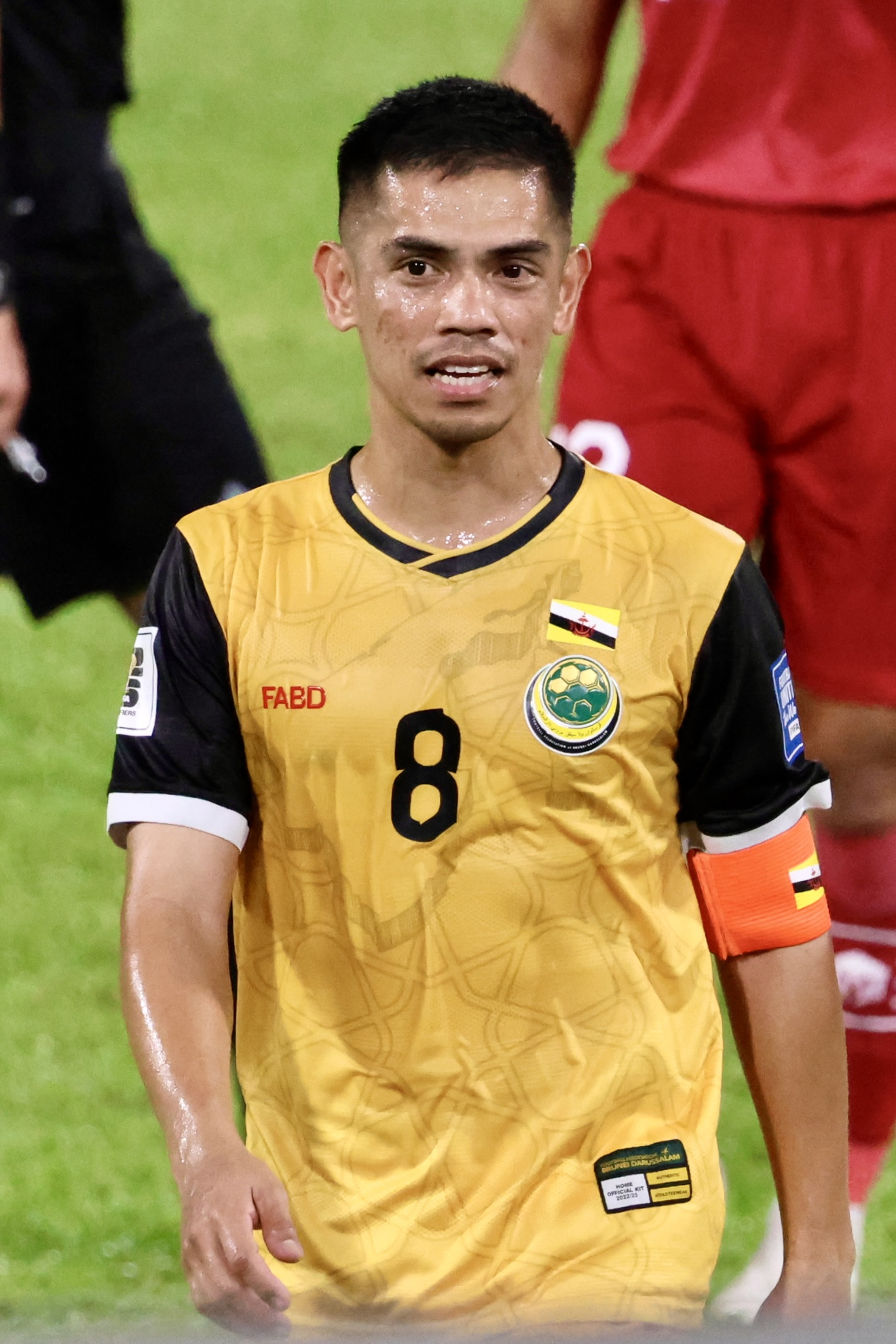
- Hendra with Brunei in 2023

Personal information
- Full name: Mohammad Hendra Azam bin Mohammad Idris
- Date of birth: 10 August 1988 (age 38)
- Place of birth: Bandar Seri Begawan, Brunei
- Height: 1.64 m (5 ft 5 in)
- Position: Midfielder

Team information
- Current team: Indera
- Number: 8

Senior career*
Years	Team	Apps	(Gls)
2006–2008	Majra		
2009–2011	QAF		
2012–2024	DPMM	157	(5)
2024–	Indera	24	(7)

International career^{‡}
2012–2014	Brunei U21	6	(1)
2011	Brunei U23	5	(0)
2009–2024	Brunei	23	(0)
- * Club domestic league appearances and goals as of 17 October 2026 ‡ National team caps and goals as of 8 October 2024

Mohammad Hendra Azam bin Mohammad Idris (born 10 August 1988) is a Bruneian footballer who plays as a midfielder for Brunei Super League club Indera.

== Club career ==
=== Majra ===
Hendra began his career with Majra FC where he once scored from the halfway line seconds after the opposing team were celebrating an equalizer and failing to prepare for the restart. He moved to QAF FC in 2009 where he won the Brunei Premier League in his first season with them.

=== DPMM ===
Hendra joined DPMM in 2012, and broke into the first team the following year, scoring in the semi-final of the 2013 Singapore League Cup.

By the 2019 season, Hendra became an integral part of the DPMM squad, starting in most matches as a deep-lying playmaker. On 28 April in the home fixture against Hougang United FC, deep into injury time with the game poised at 2–2, Hendra floated in a 40-yard free-kick which bounced directly into the net to score the game-winning goal. That goal became an important moment in DPMM's season as they became the league champions come September, overcoming Hougang's own title challenge.

DPMM participated in the domestic FA Cup in 2022, and Hendra was instrumental in the team's advancement all the way to the final on 4 December against Kasuka FC. Hendra started in midfield and was victorious with a 2–1 win, bringing DPMM their second FA Cup triumph after last winning the competition in 2004.

After the end of the 2023 Singapore Premier League, Hendra was released from the DPMM roster along with Wardun Yussof, Fakharrazi Hassan, Helmi Zambin, Abdul Azizi Ali Rahman and Razimie Ramlli.

=== Indera ===
Hendra moved to Indera SC at the start of the 2024–25 Brunei Super League, and made his debut in the first fixture of the competition on 30 August 2024 against MS PPDB, scoring the first goal for Indera and thus the league itself in a 2–0 victory. In the league fixture on 22 October held at the Hassanal Bolkiah National Stadium, he captained Indera in the match against the second team of his former side DPMM II, where Indera eventually fell to a 0–2 loss. He finished the season with six goals in 11 matches. Later in the year, Indera managed to go all the way to the final of the 2025 Brunei FA Cup where they were beaten by DPMM II yet again.

Hendra enjoyed a consistent spell throughout the 2025–26 Brunei Super League season, and both Indera and table leaders Kasuka were unbeaten on the final day of the season where they play against each other in a title decider. It was Indera who prevailed on the night with a 3–2 victory, handing Hendra his first ever Brunei Super League title.

== International career ==
Hendra made his debut for the national team in the 2010 AFC Challenge Cup qualification against hosts Sri Lanka in a 1–5 loss, when the whole team was represented by his then club side QAF FC for the tournament. He made further appearances in the AFF Suzuki Cup qualifying rounds of 2012 and 2014.

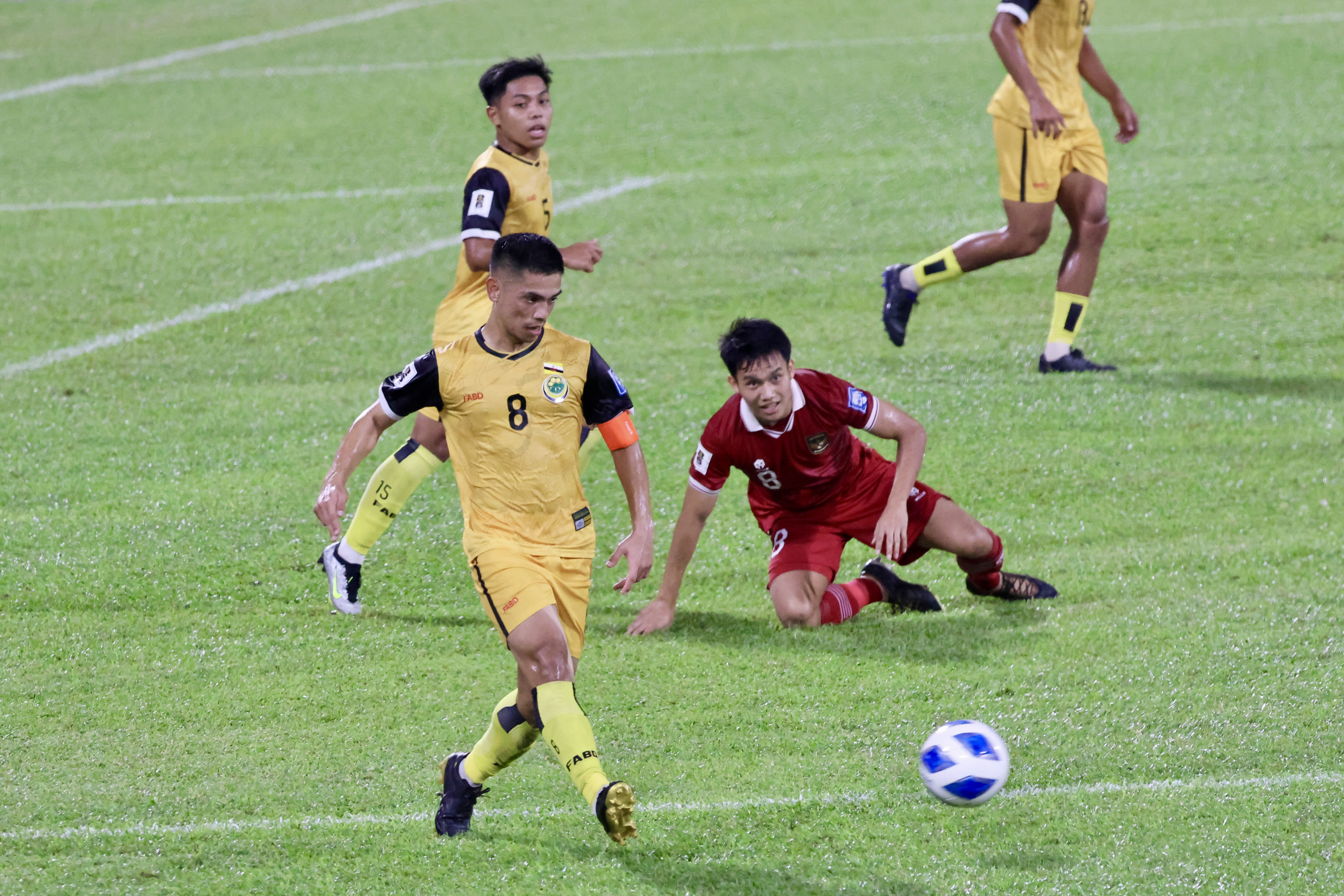
Hendra playing against Indonesia during the 2026 FIFA World Cup qualification

Hendra saw action for the Under-23s at the 2011 SEA Games in Indonesia. He was selected for the Under-21s in the 2012 Hassanal Bolkiah Trophy a year later, playing in the final for the host's maiden success. Picked again for 2014 as an overage player, he started 3 games as Brunei narrowly failed to advance from the group stage.

After featuring for the DPMM first-team for the last few seasons Hendra was in line to be called up for international duty in June 2019, but declined the invitation to play for Brunei at the 2022 World Cup qualification.

Hendra returned to the international fold in 2022, taking up captaincy and playing in three friendly games against Malaysia, the Maldives and Laos. He led Brunei to qualification for the 2022 AFF Championship with victory over Timor-Leste that November, winning 6–3 on aggregate. The following month in the group stage of the tournament Hendra played two games from the start and two as a substitute as Brunei failed to earn any points in the regional tournament.

Hendra stayed as captain for the 6 September 2023 unofficial friendly against Sabah FC at the Track & Field Sports Complex, which ended in a 1–3 loss. He did not travel to Hong Kong for the away friendly against the Hong Kong national football team five days later, which resulted in an acrimonious 10–0 drubbing by the home side. In the following month, he led the Wasps for the 2026 World Cup qualification two-legged match against a daunting opponent in Indonesia. Recognising the gulf in strength, Hendra jested that their opposition would "play a 1-1-8 formation" against his team, a comment that amused Indonesia's head coach, Shin Tae-yong. He started in the first leg and also the second leg five days later in Brunei but suffered a 0–6 defeat in both matches, resulting in Brunei's elimination from the 2026 FIFA World Cup.

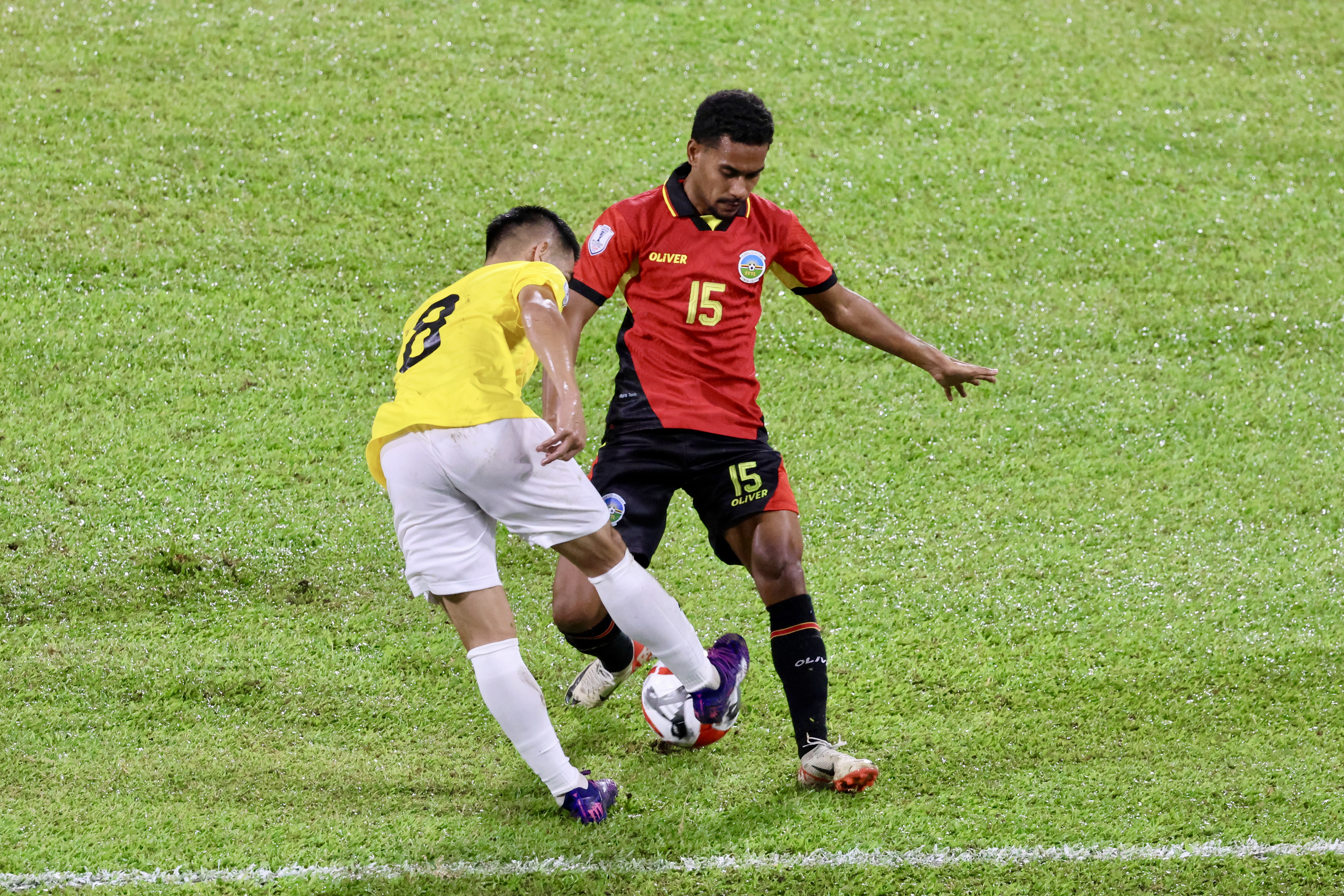
Hendra playing against East Timor during the 2024 ASEAN Championship qualification

After his release from DPMM in early 2024, he missed out on traveling with the Wasps at the 2024 FIFA Series and subsequent friendly games against Sri Lanka, relinquishing the captain's armband to cousin Azwan Ali Rahman who was already captaining his club. Having proven his match fitness at Indera, Brunei interim head coach Jamie McAllister selected him for the play-off round of the 2027 Asian Cup qualification two-legged tie against Macau that following September. He made the starting eleven in the first match at Hassanal Bolkiah National Stadium on 6 September, partnering Azwan in center midfield and gave a commandeering display in a 3–0 victory. A month later, he also played the first leg at home against Timor-Leste for the 2024 ASEAN Championship qualification in a 0–1 loss, the goal by Gali Freitas ultimately deciding the tie and incurred Brunei's elimination from the year's regional meet.

== Honours ==
QAF

- Brunei Premier League: 2009–10

DPMM

- S.League: 2015
- Singapore League Cup: 2012, 2014
- Singapore Premier League: 2019
- Brunei FA Cup: 2022

Indera

- Brunei Super League: 2025–26
- Brunei FA Cup: 2025 (runners-up)

Brunei U-21

- Hassanal Bolkiah Trophy: 2012

Individual

- Meritorious Service Medal (PJK; 2012)

== Personal life ==
Hendra's cousins are Brunei internationals Azwan Ali Rahman and Abdul Azizi Ali Rahman. His elder brother Dannie Hendra is a former footballer. His younger brother Hendra Putera also played football as a goalkeeper.
