= Azwan Saleh =

Bruneian footballer

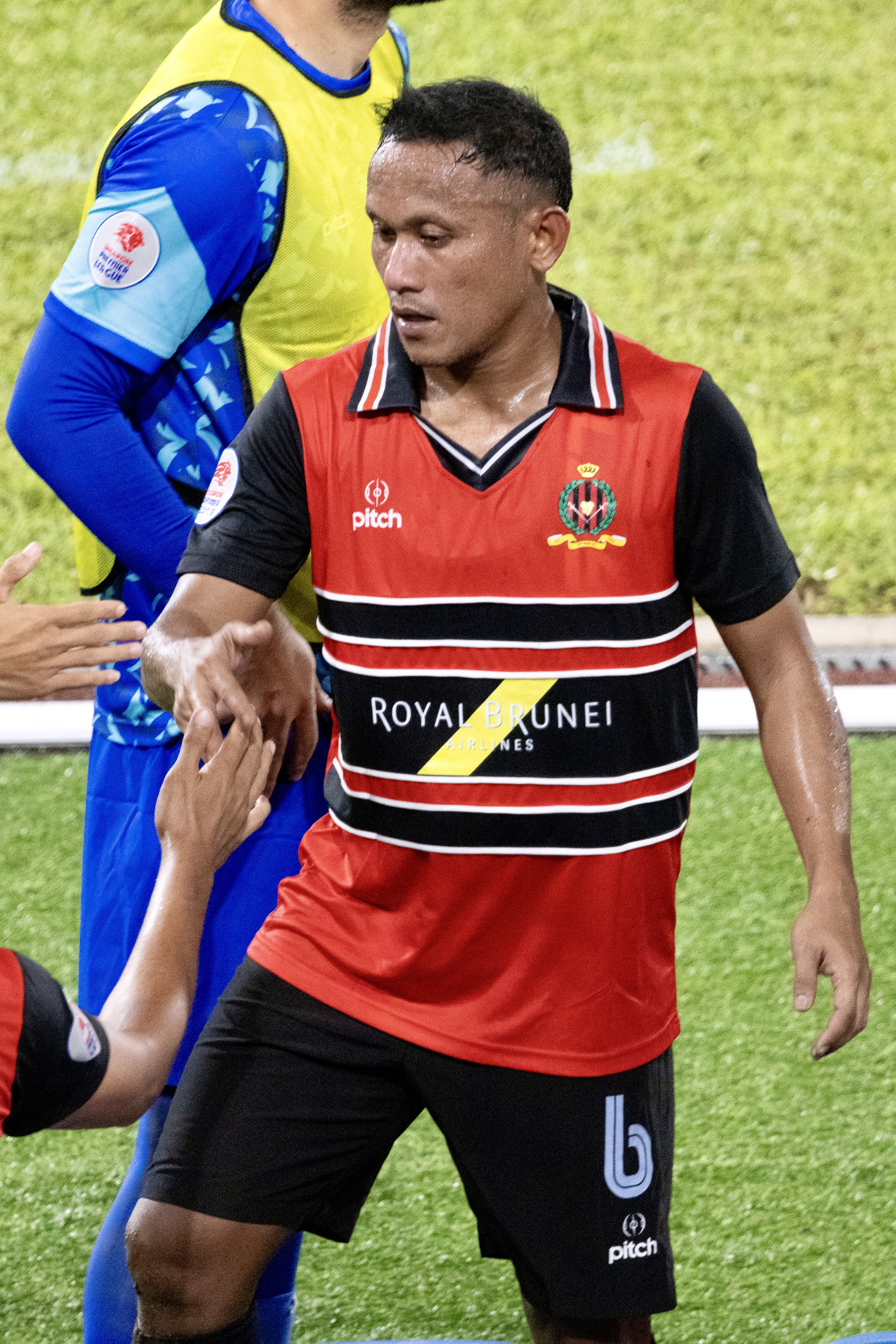
- Azwan with DPMM in 2025

Personal information
- Full name: Azwan bin Muhamad Saleh
- Date of birth: 6 January 1988 (age 38)
- Place of birth: Bandar Seri Begawan, Brunei
- Height: 1.68 m (5 ft 6 in)
- Position: Midfielder

Team information
- Current team: DPMM FC II
- Number: 6

Senior career*
Years	Team	Apps	(Gls)
2004–2005	Brunei Shell		
2005–2006	QAF		
2007–2025	DPMM	198+	(12)
2010–2011	→ Indera (loan)		
2025–2026	Kasuka	10	(1)
2026–	DPMM II	4	(2)

International career^{‡}
2007	Brunei U21	3	(0)
2008–2011	Brunei U23	4	(0)
2006–2025	Brunei	36	(3)
- * Club domestic league appearances and goals as of 3 November 2026 ‡ National team caps and goals as of 27 March 2025

Azwan bin Muhamad Saleh (born 6 January 1988) is a Bruneian footballer who plays as a midfielder for DPMM FC II of the Brunei Super League. His patronym is oftentimes erroneously written as Salleh. He is currently the player with the most international appearances for the Brunei national football team with 36 caps.

== Club career ==
Azwan first played club football with Brunei Shell FT of the second division of the Brunei Premier League. He then moved to QAF FC of the B-League Premier I, gaining his first international appearances while his team was sent to represent the national team for regional qualifying tournaments of the likes of AFC Challenge Cup and the AFF Championship. He transferred to the under-21 team of DPMM in 2007, initially playing as a striker. He played deeper in midfield as the 2007-08 season progressed, which would be the final season DPMM played in Malaysia. Moving to the Singaporean S.League in 2009 with his club, he was a key player for Vjeran Simunić who deployed him on the left side of DPMM's midfield. Their season was ended abruptly due to FIFA's suspension of Brunei, but not before winning the League Cup.

Azwan was loaned to Indera SC in 2010 while his parent club were barred from playing in the S.League. The ban was lifted in 2012 and DPMM retained Azwan who started in their first game back against Tampines Rovers. They replicated their League Cup success that year, with Azwan scoring a direct free-kick in the final.

Due to the emergence of namesake Azwan Ali Rahman from 2014, Azwan switched to a more defensive role, surrendering the number 7 shirt in 2015. He played in 15 games, half of them substitute appearances as DPMM won their first S.League title. He scored his first league goal in 3 years against Geylang International on 5 August via a long-distance shot with his weaker right foot.

In 2022, Azwan added the Brunei FA Cup winner's medal to his collection by winning the trophy on 4 December against Kasuka FC 2–1 in the final on 4 December.

On 22 September 2024, Azwan was given a rare start in place of the unavailable Azwan Ali Rahman by head coach Jamie McAllister against title contenders BG Tampines Rovers who were unbeaten in the league at that point. Playing his namesake and club captain's central midfield role, he lasted the whole match in a remarkable 3–2 victory for DPMM who recorded their first win at their Bandar Seri Begawan home ground of the season. He would not make another appearance in the first eleven until 2 November against Albirex Niigata (S) where in the fifth minute of stoppage time, he gathered the ball just outside of the penalty box and released a strike from range that beat Hassan Sunny to win the match 2–3 to the away side.

At the end of the 2024–25 season, Azwan was released from the club, bringing the end of his 18-year stint. He subsequently joined Kasuka FC and made his playing debut for the club in the 2025–26 AFC Challenge League qualifying play-off against Phnom Penh Crown on 12 August 2025, in a 0–6 loss. He scored his first goal for Kasuka in a 4–0 win over Rimba Star on 31 October. In his first season with the club, he finished in second place after losing ground in the final fixture to Indera SC.

== International career ==
Azwan was a member of the Brunei Under-21s for the 2007 Hassanal Bolkiah Trophy held in his home country. He also played for the Under-23s at the 2008 Sukma Games in Malaysia and captained the side at the 2011 SEA Games in Indonesia.

Azwan holds the record number of appearances for Brunei, with 36 caps to his name. His debut came in the 2006 AFC Challenge Cup in a 0–1 loss against Sri Lanka in Bangladesh. He scored on two occasions in AFF Suzuki Cup qualifying, one against Timor-Leste in 2008, which was also his first international goal, and the other against Cambodia in 2012.

Azwan was appointed captain of the national team for the two-legged 2018 World Cup qualifier against Chinese Taipei. The team went down 0–2 at home after an encouraging 1–0 win at Kaohsiung. Azwan joined up with the Wasps for the 2016 AFF Suzuki Cup qualification held in Cambodia in October 2016. With Najib Tarif injured since the first game, he was placed at left-back in the third game against Laos which ended in a 4–3 loss.

Azwan started the first match of the 2016 AFC Solidarity Cup in central midfield against Timor-Leste in Kuching, Malaysia. The match ended 4–0 to the Wasps in their biggest victory of date. He played a total of four games for the Wasps at central midfield in the tournament.

Azwan was in line for an international recall in June 2019 for the 2022 World Cup qualification matches against Mongolia, but made himself unavailable due to unspecified reasons. Three years later, he made his 27th international appearance against Malaysia away in Kuala Lumpur as a substitute in a 4–0 loss on 27 May. In the same year, he clocked another appearance from the bench against Laos in a 1–0 win at Bandar Seri Begawan on 27 September.

On 5 November 2022, Azwan scored the fourth goal against Timor-Leste in a 6–2 win for the Wasps at home in the 2022 AFF Mitsubishi Electric Cup qualifying first leg match. He also made a substitute appearance at the return leg three days later, helping Brunei qualify for the tournament after last competing in 1996. He made three appearances in the group stage, including one from the starting lineup against the Philippines in a 5–1 defeat in Manila on 23 December.

In June 2024, Brunei played two friendly games against Sri Lanka at their home ground, coached by DPMM's Rui Capela who selected almost the entire squad including Azwan. He gained his 34th international cap in the second game on the 11th as a substitute, where Brunei managed a 1–0 victory. Later that year, he was selected for the away friendly against Russia on 15 November, and started the game in an 11–0 defeat.

Azwan was given the captain's armband in place of his namesake for the first group game of the 2027 AFC Asian Cup qualifying against Lebanon which was hosted by Qatar on 25 March 2025. The Cedars ran out 5–0 winners at the end of the match.

== International goals ==
No.	Date	Venue	Opponent	Score	Result	Competition
1.	21 October 2008	National Olympic Stadium, Phnom Penh, Cambodia	Timor-Leste	3–0	4–1	2008 AFF Suzuki Cup qualification
2.	9 October 2012	Thuwunna Stadium, Yangon, Myanmar	Cambodia	3–1	3–2	2012 AFF Suzuki Cup qualification
3.	5 November 2022	Track & Field Sports Complex, Bandar Seri Begawan, Brunei	Timor-Leste	4–2	6–2	2022 AFF Championship qualification

== Honours ==
=== Team ===
QAF

- Brunei Premier League: 2005–06

DPMM

- S.League: 2015
- Singapore Premier League: 2019
- Singapore League Cup: 2009, 2012, 2014
- Brunei FA Cup: 2022

=== Individual ===
- IFFHS Brunei All Time Dream Team: 2021
