= Naasiruddeen Abdul Wahab =

Bruneian footballer

Naasiruddeen
Personal information
- Full name: Naasiruddeen bin Abdul Wahab
- Date of birth: 3 May 1989 (age 37)
- Place of birth: Brunei
- Position: Midfielder

Team information
- Current team: DSP United
- Number: 12

Senior career*
Years	Team	Apps	(Gls)
2006–2010	QAF FC		
2011–2016	Kilanas FC		(4)
2017	DSP United		(2)

International career^{‡}
2009	Brunei	3	(0)
- * Club domestic league appearances and goals as of 14 February 2019 ‡ National team caps and goals as of 14 February 2019

Naasiruddeen bin Abdul Wahab (born 3 May 1989) is a Bruneian former footballer who last played as a midfielder for DSP United. He is a two-time Brunei Premier League champion with QAF FC and represented Brunei on three occasions in 2009.

== Club career ==
Naasiruddeen began his playing career with local powerhouse QAF FC, winning the Brunei Premier League on two occasions namely the 2007-08 and 2009-10 seasons. He left to join Kilanas FC of the Brunei Premier League II in 2011 and scored a hat-trick against Muara Vella FC on 24 April.

Kilanas were one of the founder clubs of the Brunei Super League but frequently finished in the lower half. They suffered back-to-back relegations in 2015 and 2016. Naasiruddeen moved to promoted DSP United for the 2017 Brunei Premier League and finished fourth in the table. He scored twice in one match against Tunas FC on 9 July.

== International career ==
Naasiruddeen debuted for the Brunei national football team (represented by QAF FC) on 4 April 2009 against Sri Lanka in the 2010 AFC Challenge Cup qualifying matches held in Colombo, Sri Lanka. He was a first-half substitute for Zulkhairi Salleh and finished the game on the losing side with a 5–1 score. He was also a substitute in the next game against Pakistan two days later, which ended 0–6 against the Wasps. He was finally handed a start by Ali Mustafa in the final game against Chinese Taipei, however once again Brunei were defeated 5 goals to nil.

== Honours ==
QAF FC

- Brunei Premier League (2): 2007–08, 2009–10
- Brunei League Cup (2): 2008, 2009

== Personal life ==
Naasiruddeen is an alumnus of Institut Teknologi Brunei (currently Universiti Teknologi Brunei). He became the president of the institute's Student Representative Council for the 2014 academic year, and graduated in 2016 as a Bachelor of Engineering in Electrical and Communications Engineering. He received the Vice Chancellor's Award for his academic excellence there.
