= Football Federation of Brunei Darussalam =

Former national football association of Brunei

- Founded: 2008; 18 years ago
- Folded: 2011; 15 years ago
- Headquarters: Bandar Seri Begawan
- President: Hamid Jaafar
- Vice-President: Salleh Bostaman Zainal Abidin

The Football Federation of Brunei Darussalam (Malay: Persekutuan Bolasepak Negara Brunei Darussalam; abbrev: FFBD) was a football association that governed Brunei football between 2009 and 2011, the period when Brunei was suspended by world governing body of association football, FIFA. It was not recognised as a replacement to Brunei Football Association (BAFA) as FIFA deemed the de-registration of BAFA in 2008 as government interference of the country's football affairs.

== Establishment ==
In December 2008, FFBD registered with the Registrar of Societies and announced their establishment on 15 January 2009 with the blessing of the Ministry of Culture, Youth and Sports of Brunei with the intention of replacing BAFA as Brunei's national association representative at FIFA. Its president was former national player Hamid Jaafar who was then the Permanent Secretary at the Ministry of Industry and Primary Resources. Other key positions include prominent lawyer Sheikh Noordin Sheikh Mohammad as General Secretary, Johari Bongsu as secretariat, Rosanan Samak as Tournament Secretary and Yunos Yusof as treasurer.

However FIFA and by extension regional associations AFC and AFF refused to acknowledge FFBD, insisting that BAFA should be reinstated by the Brunei government. Finally in September 2009, FIFA suspended Brunei from its membership, banning the country from participating in any affiliated tournaments and leagues.

FFBD organised the 2009–10 Brunei Premier League, the 2009 Brunei League Cup and the 2010 Brunei FA Cup under the FIFA ban. The 2011 Brunei Premier League was still underway when FIFA announced the lifting of Brunei's suspension in June 2011, with the condition that a new association called the National Football Association of Brunei Darussalam (NFABD) be its sole representative. This effectively outlawed FFBD and led to its swift dismemberment as well as the cancellation of all ongoing tournaments organised by FFBD.

== Association members ==
| Name | Position | Notes |
|---|---|---|
| Hamid Jaafar | President | |
| Salleh Bostaman | Deputy President | |
| Sheikh Mohammad | General Secretary | |
| Johari Bongsu | Secretariat | |
| Rosanan Samak | Tournament Secretary | |
| Yunos Yusof | Treasurer | |
