= Abdulla Al-Zaabi =

Emirati football referee (born 1978)

Abdulah Ali Abdulla Alaajel Al-Zaabi (born 1978) is an Emirati football referee who refereed in the 2012 AFF Suzuki Cup qualification.

Al-Zaabi became a FIFA referee in 2012.
