= Syarafuddin Hamdi Talip =

Brunei football player

Syarafuddin Hamdi
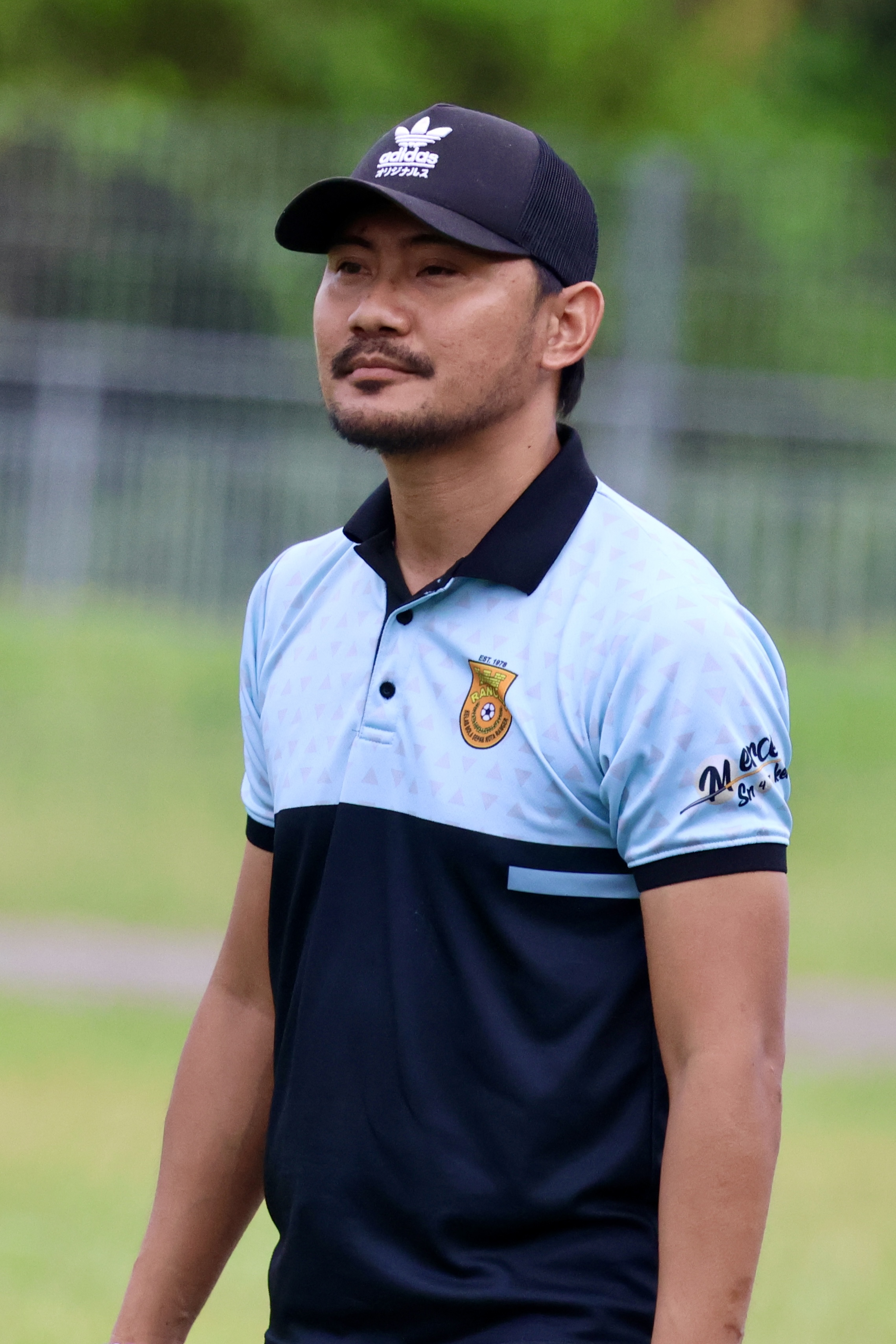
- Syarafuddin with Kota Ranger in 2024

Personal information
- Full name: Mohamad Syarafuddin Hamdi bin Haji Talip
- Date of birth: 8 October 1987 (age 39)
- Place of birth: Brunei
- Position: Defender

Senior career*
Years	Team	Apps	(Gls)
- AM Gunners
2011–2016	MS PDB		(9)
2017	Tutong Hotspurs		
2017–2021	Kota Ranger		(1)

International career
2007	Brunei U21	2	(0)
2015–2017	Brunei	1	(0)

Managerial career
- 2021–2022: Kota Ranger
- 2025–2026: Kota Ranger
- * Club domestic league appearances and goals

Mohamad Syarafuddin Hamdi bin Haji Talip (born 8 October 1987) is a Bruneian former footballer and current coach who played as a defender.

== Club career ==
A career police officer in the Royal Brunei Police Force, Syarafuddin started playing league football when his employers entered a soccer team to compete in the Brunei football leagues in 2011, namely MS PDB. Having helped secure his team's participation in the inaugural 2012–13 Brunei Super League, Syarafuddin also managed to score in the semi-final of the Brunei Darussalam National Games' football tournament on 12 September as team captain. The policemen ultimately lost to the Armed Forces in the final. Later in December of that year, MS PDB managed to get to the semi-finals of the 2012 Brunei FA Cup but lost in penalties to Indera FC, even though Syarafuddin greatly contributed en route by scoring in the two previous rounds.

Syarafuddin played in the first ever fixture of the Brunei Super League on 14 December 2012, which was eventually won by MS ABDB. MS PDB finished fifth in the 10-team league that season, with Syarafuddin occasionally playing as a target striker. MS PDB would perform modestly in the next two seasons, finishing in the lower half of the Super League table.

Syarafuddin transferred to Kota Ranger FC in 2017, after a brief stop at Tutong Hotspurs where he won the Tutong District League. The Brunei international scored his first goal for Kota Ranger on 8 July against Wijaya FC in a 3–2 win. He helped Kota Ranger to finish second behind MS ABDB at the conclusion of the 2017–18 season. In the following year, he managed to collect his first Brunei FA Cup medal by beating his old club MS PDB in the final.

== International career ==
Syarafuddin was a Bruneian youth international who was selected for the 2007 Hassanal Bolkiah Trophy held in his home country. He played in two group games against the Philippines and Cambodia. He was dropped to the bench for Abdul Aziz Tamit in the final group game against Myanmar in which the team lost 3–1, eliminating the hosts from the knockout phase via number of goals scored.

Syarafuddin made his senior international debut as a substitute in a 5–1 loss against Singapore on 6 June 2015. Two years later, he was bound for the island of Sumatra for the 2017 Aceh World Solidarity Tsunami Cup held in Banda Aceh in early December. He took the field in a 4–0 defeat to Indonesia in the first game.

His most recent involvement with the national team was as assistant coach to Robbie Servais for the 2022 FIFA World Cup qualification matches against Mongolia in 2019.

== Coaching career ==
While still registered as a player, Syarafuddin coached the team starting from the 2021 Brunei Super League. He became head coach full time the next year, competing for the 2022 Brunei FA Cup.

== Honours ==
=== Team ===
Tutong Hotspurs FT

- Tutong District League: 2017

Kota Ranger FC

- Brunei FA Cup: 2019
