= Bondaran =

Bondaran بنداران
- Village
- Location within Iran
- Coordinates: 26°36′54″N 57°05′30″E
- Country: Iran
- Province: Hormozgan
- County: Minab
- Bakhsh: Byaban
- Rural District: Sirik

Population (2006)
  - Total: 599
- Time zone: UTC+3:30 (IRST)
  - Summer (DST): UTC+4:30 (IRDT)

Bondaran (Persian: بنداران, also Romanized as Bondārān and Bāndārān; also known as Bāndrān, Bonārdān, and Bundrām) is a village in Sirik Rural District, Byaban District, Minab County, Hormozgan Province, Iran. At the 2006 census, its population was 599, in 128 families.
