= FC Phosphor =

- Founded: 2000
- Ground: Bandar Seri Begawan, Brunei
- Chairman: Tengku Syed Herdiman
- Manager: Tengku Syed Herdiman
- League: Brunei Premier Futsal League
Home colours	Away colours

FC Phosphor is a futsal club based in Bandar Seri Begawan, Brunei.

Previously, they were a football team that participated in the 2018 Brunei-Muara District League. Their under-20 youth team had also competed in the 2023 Brunei National Under-20 Youth League.
