= 2012–13 Brunei Super League =

Brunei Super League
- Season: 2012–13
- Champions: Indera SC (1st title)
- Matches: 45
- Goals: 231 (5.13 per match)
- Top goalscorer: Azwan Ali Rahman (17 goals)
- Biggest home win: QAF FC 9–2 Najip FC
- Biggest away win: Najip FC 1–20 Indera SC
- Highest scoring: Najip FC 1–20 Indera SC

The 2012 Brunei Super League was the first season of the Brunei Super League. It was organized by the National Football Association of Brunei Darussalam and sponsored by DST Group. It began in December 2012 with ten teams vying for the championship in its inaugural edition.

On 26 January 2013, Indera SC defeated Najip FC twenty goals to one, which was the highest-scoring match in the history of the Brunei Super League until 18 January 2026 when Kasuka FC beat Hawa FC 26–1. Exactly a week later, MS ABDB beat the same team with the score of 11–1, with goalkeeper Suhandi Mahali scoring a penalty in the game, making him the first goalkeeper to score in the Super League, and third overall in Brunei football history.

The league championship went down to the wire on 10 March 2013, with Indera SC needing a win against the unbeaten Royal Brunei Armed Forces Sports Council. The league top scorer Azwan Ali Rahman scored the winner for Indera on the 82nd minute to give Indera the league championship on goal difference, thanks to the abovementioned game against Najip where they scored nine more goals than their opposition had managed.

== Teams ==
=== Qualification ===
The newly-formed National Football Association of Brunei Darussalam organised a competition called the National Football League from December 2011 to May 2012. 32 clubs were divided into four groups to determine the ten teams who will compete in the Super League. The qualified teams were as follows:

Club	Manager/head coach	Captain	Qualification route
Kilanas FC	Radzuan Madali	Razi Lamit	Group D runners-up
Indera SC	Rosdin Aziz (manager); Omar Jamil (head coach)	Khayrun Salleh	Group C winners
Jerudong FC	Jalauddin Ghazali (manager); Ali Rashid (head coach)	Radzi Tamat; Sufian Lamudin	Group B runners-up
LLRC FT	Affandi Julaihi	Bahrin Sahari	Group A winners
Majra United FC	Suhaimi Majid (manager); Faisalani Ghani (head coach)	Yusof Salleh	Group D winners
MS ABDB	Maj. Azaman Hussin (manager); Saifful Rizal Awang (head coach)	Affendy Akup	Group C runners-up
MS PDB	SSgt Sahrin Jaya	Rosmini Kahar	Best third-placed team
Najip FC	Najip Moktal	Sumardi Aiadin	Group A runners-up
QAF FC	Rahim Daud	Riwandi Wahit	Group B winners
Wijaya FC	Ahyana Tali	Marhazif Ahad	Second best third-placed team

== League standings ==
Pos	Team	Pld	W	D	L	GF	GA	GD	Pts
1	Indera SC	9	7	1	1	45	12	+33	22
2	MS ABDB	9	7	1	1	30	7	+23	22
3	Majra United FC	9	5	4	0	21	12	+9	19
4	QAF FC	9	5	1	3	25	17	+8	16
5	MS PDB	9	5	1	3	24	17	+7	16
6	LLRC FT	9	4	1	4	19	21	−2	13
7	Wijaya FC	9	3	1	5	21	23	−2	10
8	Jerudong FC	9	1	3	5	17	17	0	6
9	Kilanas FC	9	1	1	7	19	30	−11	4
10	Najip FC	9	0	0	9	11	76	−65	0

Updated to match(es) played on 9 March 2013. Source: Soccerway
Rules for classification: 1) points; 2) goal difference; 3) number of goals scored.

== Top scorers ==
Pos	Player	Club	Goals
1	(Brunei) Azwan Ali Rahman	Indera SC	17
2	(Brunei) Hamizan Aziz Sulaiman	Indera SC	13
3	(Brunei) Rosmini Kahar	MS PDB	9
4	(Brunei) Abdul Azizi Ali Rahman	MS ABDB	8
5	(Brunei) Budiman Jumat	MS ABDB	7
5	(Brunei) Hafis Mahari	QAF FC	7
5	(Brunei) Safuan Juhar	LLRC FT	7
8	(Brunei) Abu Bakar Mahari	Jerudong FC	6
9	(Brunei) Esmendy Brahim	Jerudong FC	5
9	(Brunei) Nor Hidayatullah Zaini	Kilanas FC	5
