= Azwan Ali Rahman =

Bruneian footballer (born 1992)

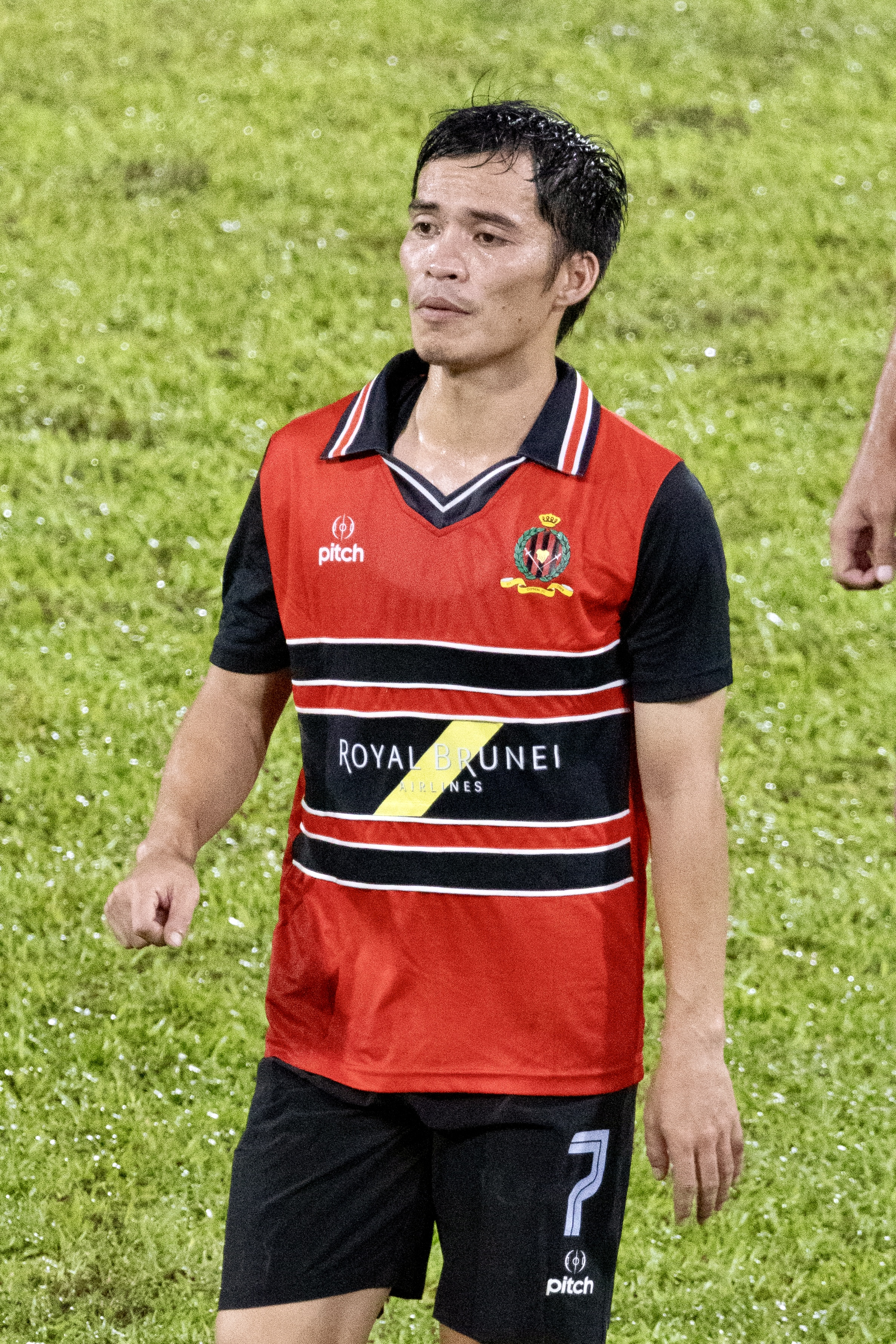
- Azwan with DPMM in 2025

Personal information
- Full name: Muhammad Azwan bin Ali Rahman
- Date of birth: 11 January 1992 (age 34)
- Place of birth: Bandar Seri Begawan, Brunei
- Height: 1.65 m (5 ft 5 in)
- Position: Midfielder

Team information
- Current team: DPMM
- Number: 7

Youth career
- 2004–2010: Sports School

Senior career*
Years	Team	Apps	(Gls)
2007–2010	Jerudong		
2011	Brunei Youth Team		
2012–2013	Indera		(17)
2019	DPMM II	1	(0)
2013–	DPMM	220	(41)

International career^{‡}
2012	Brunei U21	5	(1)
2013–2015	Brunei U23	10	(2)
2012–	Brunei	34	(9)
- * Club domestic league appearances and goals as of 20 November 2026 ‡ National team caps and goals as of 30 September 2026

Muhammad Azwan bin Ali Rahman (born 11 January 1992) is a Bruneian professional footballer who plays as a midfielder for and captains both Malaysia Super League club DPMM and the Brunei national team. He is the top-scorer of the Brunei national team with nine goals.

== Club career ==
=== Jerudong ===
A product of Brunei's Sports School, Azwan first represented Jerudong in the Brunei Premier League at the age of 15. He was transferred to a national youth team (formerly the under-16s) playing in the 2011 Brunei Premier League and became their captain.

=== Indera SC ===
Azwan moved to Indera SC in 2012 and in the following year won the inaugural Brunei Super League, scoring 17 goals (including seven in one match) to finish as top scorer.

=== DPMM ===
The following year in 2013, Azwan immediately linked up with Brunei's sole professional team DPMM and made 16 appearances in his first season with the club. The following year, he flourished in the first team with 6 goals in 26 games, receiving plaudits from his new manager Steve Kean who claimed that he would not look out of place in any top league.

Azwan started the first half of the 2015 season in the same vein, until he was sent off for unsportsmanlike behavior in the game against Tampines Rovers on 10 May. He began the second half of the season in hot form, getting on the scoresheet in 3 consecutive home matches. However, he again saw red for violent conduct in the game against Young Lions on 23 August. The league concluded on 21 November with DPMM lifting the title.

In the 2016 season, Azwan was deployed predominantly on the left wing with Ramazotti and Paulo Sergio occupying the other attacking positions as Kean sought to defend the S.League title using a 3-4-3 formation. His 7 goals contributed to DPMM finishing in third place in a season curtailed by an ankle injury suffered in June.

Six goals in all competitions for an ever-present Azwan was still a bad return in a forgettable 2017 season where DPMM finished in 8th place. Despite a change in coach, Azwan carried his irregular form over to the next year, finding himself in a midfield three with Hendra Azam and Azwan Saleh while Iranian import Mojtaba Esmaeilzadeh occupied his left wing spot. He would later yield his midfield spot to captain Shahrazen Said but a drop in performance by Esmaeilzadeh presented Azwan with another opportunity in the starting lineup.

Azwan scored the winner against 2019 Singapore Premier League leaders Tampines Rovers in a 2–1 victory at Hassanal Bolkiah National Stadium on 7 April. This was his first goal in the league since netting against Garena Young Lions in November 2017. He duly opened the scoring in the following fixture against Warriors FC on 20 April, a lob over the goalkeeper in the first minute, to help win the match 4–2. He performed well for the rest of the campaign, winning the league title with two games to spare come September.

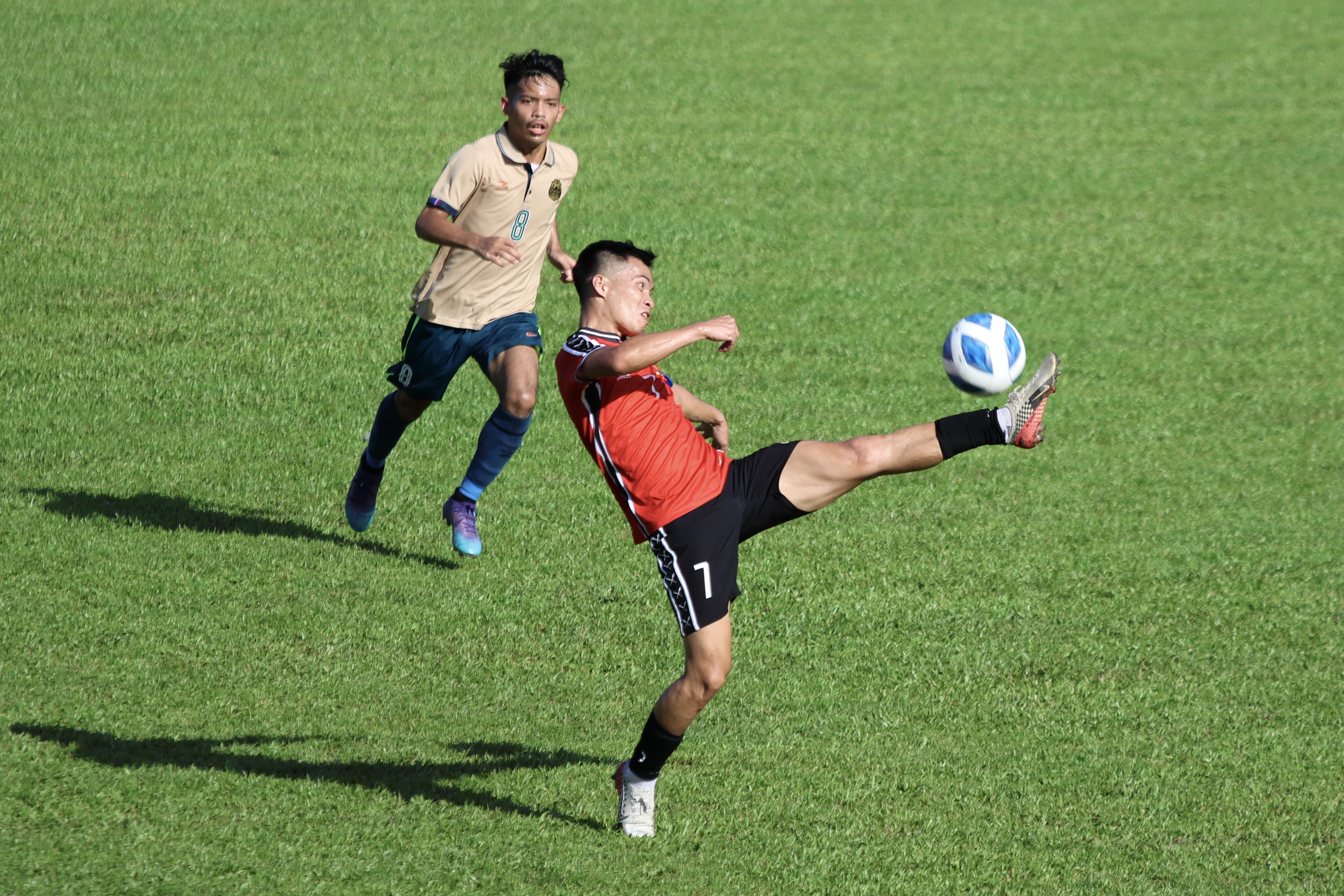
Azwan with DPMM in a match against Kasuka during the 2022 FA Cup Final

==== DPMM II ====
At the start of the 2019 Brunei Premier League, Azwan captained the first DPMM alongside the other two first team players,Azim Izamuddin Suhaimi, Abdul Azizi Ali Rahman also registered with the team lineup to compete in Brunei after 14 years away. This was to be his only appearance despite being registered for the league.

=== Back to the main team ===
In 2022, DPMM played domestically for the Brunei FA Cup, with Azwan now serving as team captain. Azwan scored six goals at the campaign, including a first-half injury time equaliser in a 2–1 victory over Kasuka in the final at the Track & Field Sports Complex.

When Azwan's team returned to the Singapore Premier League in 2023, he retained the captain's armband. He opened his scoring account for the campaign in a 3–4 loss to Balestier Khalsa on 10 March. In the 2023 Singapore Cup fixture on 24 September 2023, Azwan scored the first goal in a 1–1 draw against recently crowned 2023 Singapore Premier League champions, Albirex Niigata (S).

Azwan scored his first goal for the 2024–25 season in an enthralling 3–3 draw against Geylang International on 22 June 2024, which was their first league match played at the Hassanal Bolkiah National Stadium since the COVID-19 pandemic. He ended the season with four goals in 27 appearances, with DPMM finishing their Singapore stint strongly with six straight league victories and managing to advance to the semi-finals of the 2024–25 Singapore Cup. He was selected for the ASEAN All-Stars in the Maybank Challenge Cup against Manchester United in Kuala Lumpur on 28 May but had to decline due to club commitments.

After the departure of namesake Azwan Saleh before their return to the Malaysia Super League in the 2025–26 season, Azwan became the player holding the second-longest tenure in DPMM after Najib Tarif. He netted his first goal of the season against Kuching City in the 2025 Malaysia FA Cup round of 16 fixture on 16 August.

In what was his 200th league appearance for DPMM, Azwan was made ineffective by the superstar midfield of Johor Darul Ta'zim in a 10–0 rout of his side by the Malaysian giants in Johor Bahru on 25 October 2025. Things turned for the better when he scored his first goal in the league against Immigration on 7 December in a 4–2 victory. Despite also scoring in the next two league fixtures, a six-match winless run at the end of the season left his team finishing in lowly tenth place.

Azwan remained as DPMM captain for the 2026–27 campaign, and fared better in the season's FA Cup, reaching the semi-finals. On 18 October 2026, he scored a direct free-kick in a 3–2 victory against Kuching City.

== International career ==
=== Youth ===
Azwan was in the Brunei under-21 team that won the 2012 edition of Hassanal Bolkiah Trophy, a tournament for the national under-21 teams of ASEAN countries. He played for the Brunei under-23s at the 2013 SEA Games held in Myanmar, scoring against Laos in their penultimate game. He repeated the same feat at the 2015 SEA Games in a 1–2 loss.

=== Senior ===
Azwan was included in the full Brunei squad for the 2012 AFF Championship qualification and scored his first senior international goal in the tournament against East Timor in a 2–1 win.

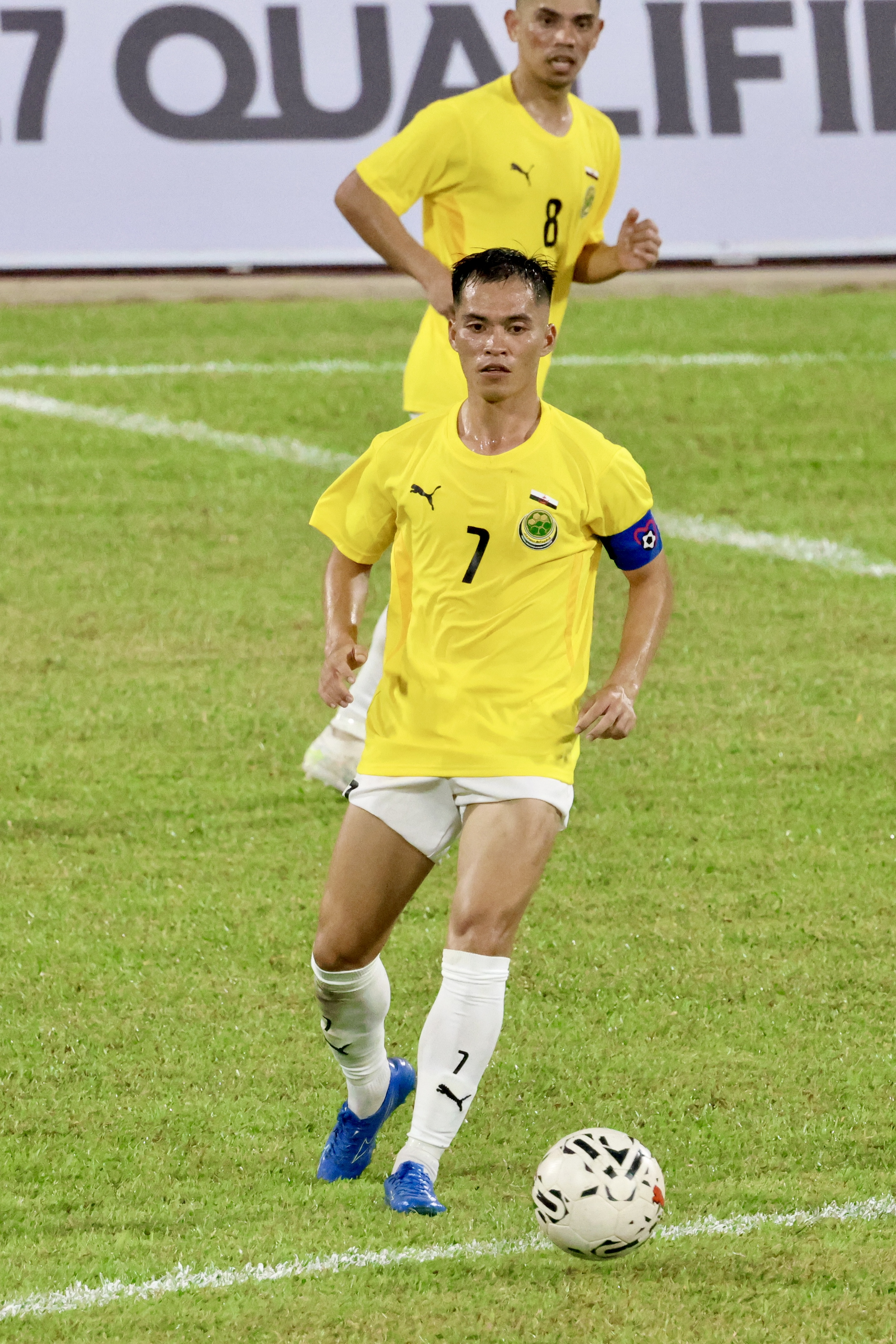
Azwan playing at the 2027 AFC Asian Cup qualification – play-off round as captain in 2024

Azwan missed the 2016 AFF Championship qualification games in October 2016 due to an ankle injury. He recovered just in time to be included in the Brunei squad for the 2016 AFC Solidarity Cup in Malaysia a fortnight later. Azwan came on as a second-half substitute in the first game against Timor-Leste and made an immediate impact as he broke the deadlock four minutes into his introduction, and further adding a second goal 6 minutes later. The match ended 4–0 to the Wasps, their biggest victory to date. He lasted 70 minutes in the semi-final against Macau before succumbing to his longstanding injury.

Azwan became the stand-in captain for Faiq Bolkiah at the away leg of the 2018 AFF Championship qualification matches against Timor-Leste on 1 September, due to take place in Kuala Lumpur. He came on at the start of the second half to replace Aminuddin Zakwan Tahir and drastically improved Brunei's play, scoring a crucial away goal in the 57th minute. However the game finished 3–1 to the team in red and black. Needing at least two goals to go through, Brunei opted for an attacking formation for the home leg in Bandar Seri Begawan. Azwan was fielded at central midfield as the captain's armband was returned to Faiq. The match finished 1–0 to Brunei, Najib Tarif scoring the winner in the 75th minute, although the Timorese came out on top 3–2 on aggregate in the end.

In June 2019, Azwan along with his brother Abdul Azizi and several other teammates had pulled out of representing Brunei at the 2022 FIFA World Cup qualification matches. This disrupted the plans of coach Robbie Servais and was one of the reasons for Brunei's elimination from the 2022 World Cup and the 2023 Asian Cup.

On 27 March 2022, Azwan captained Brunei for the friendly match against Laos away in Vientiane. He scored Brunei's first goal in a 3–2 loss for the Wasps. Later that year in September, Azwan was selected for a tri-nation tournament involving the Maldives and Laos. He came on in the second half for the first fixture, a 0–3 loss to the Maldives on 21 September, missing a penalty in the game. He also entered the game at the hour mark for Hendra Azam Idris in the second fixture against Laos six days later where the Wasps managed a 1–0 victory.

In December 2022 he was selected for the Brunei team at the 2022 AFF Championship. He made three appearances against the Philippines, Indonesia and Cambodia where Brunei registered defeats in all of the matches.

On 11 September 2023, Azwan was in the starting lineup against Hong Kong in an away friendly, which finished in an alarming 10–0 loss to the Wasps. A month later, he was selected for the national squad to face Indonesia in two legs at the 2026 FIFA World Cup qualification first round. In the first leg away in Jakarta, he was introduced around the half-hour mark in place of Hendra Azam, also donning his armband. The match ended 6–0 to the home side and the same scoreline occurred five days later in the return leg, sending Brunei out of the 2026 World Cup with a 0–12 aggregate loss.

Having been left out of the plane to Saudi Arabia for the 2024 FIFA Series, Azwan was restored to the Brunei national team and was given the captain's armband for two friendly matches against Sri Lanka on 8 and 11 June 2024. He managed to score in consecutive 1–0 victories, placing him within reach of Shah Razen Said's goalscoring record for Brunei. This also gave Brunei their first ever three-match winning streak in their history.

Azwan led the team as captain in September 2024 against Macau at the play-off round for the 2027 Asian Cup spanning over two legs. In the first home fixture in Bandar Seri Begawan on the 6th, Brunei recorded a 3–0 victory where Azwan assisted Abdul Hariz Herman for the Wasps' third goal. Four days later in Taipa at the away leg, Azwan scored the only goal of the game to secure a 4–0 aggregate win for Brunei who are through to the third round of the 2027 Asian Cup qualifying stage.

The Wasps came up against Timor-Leste in a two-legged play-off to contest the final spot at the 2024 ASEAN Championship in October 2024. Azwan played the first leg in Bandar Seri Begawan as captain where the Wasps succumbed to a Gali Freitas goal and lose 0–1. A week later Brunei only managed to play a goalless draw at Chonburi which knocked them out of the regional tournament. He led the team for a friendly match in Russia the following month, the game ending 11–0 to the hosts.

Azwan returned to captain the side in October 2025 for the 2027 AFC Asian Cup qualifying double header against Yemen, starting the first match at Bandar Seri Begawan on 9 October in a 0–2 defeat. Five days later in Kuwait City, Azwan lasted the whole 90 minutes in a 9–0 loss against the same opposition. A month later, he made a substitute appearance at the same qualifying tournament at home against Lebanon which ended in a 0–3 loss.

In June 2026, Azwan was included in the Brunei squad for the 2026 ASEAN Championship qualification two-legged tie against Timor-Leste. He was brought on at half-time by Ali Mustafa in the first leg at home where Brunei suffered a 0–3 loss. In the second leg on 9 June in Kuala Lumpur, Azwan managed to score from just outside the box for the first goal of the game before half time, becoming the outright top scorer for his nation with nine goals. Timor-Leste went on to score thrice in the second half to eliminate the Wasps from the 2026 ASEAN Championship. In the following September, Azwan captained the Wasps at the 2026 FIFA ASEAN Cup, where they suffered two losses against Laos (1–3) and Hong Kong (0–2). In the first game, Azwan assisted Haziq Naqiuddin Syamra for Brunei's solitary goal.

=== International goals ===
Scores and results list Brunei's goal tally first.

List of international goals scored by Azwan Ali Rahman
No.	Date	Venue	Opponent	Score	Result	Competition
1.	13 October 2012	Thuwunna Stadium, Yangon, Myanmar	Timor-Leste	2–0	2–1	2012 AFF Suzuki Cup qualification
2.	2 November 2016	Sarawak Stadium, Kuching, Malaysia	Timor-Leste	1–0	4–0	2016 AFC Solidarity Cup
3.	2 November 2016	Sarawak Stadium, Kuching, Malaysia	Timor-Leste	2–0	4–0	2016 AFC Solidarity Cup
4.	1 September 2018	Kuala Lumpur Stadium, Kuala Lumpur, Malaysia	Timor-Leste	1–2	1–3	2018 AFF Championship qualification
5.	27 March 2022	New Laos National Stadium, Vientiane, Laos	Laos	1–3	2–3	Friendly
6.	8 June 2024	Hassanal Bolkiah National Stadium, Bandar Seri Begawan, Brunei	Sri Lanka	1–0	1–0	Friendly
7.	11 June 2024	Hassanal Bolkiah National Stadium, Bandar Seri Begawan, Brunei	Sri Lanka	1–0	1–0	Friendly
8.	10 September 2024	Centro Desportivo Olímpico – Estádio, Taipa, Macau	Macau	1–0	1–0	2027 AFC Asian Cup qualification
9.	9 June 2026	Kuala Lumpur Stadium, Kuala Lumpur, Malaysia	Timor-Leste	1–0	1–3	2026 ASEAN Championship qualification

== Honours ==
Indera

- Brunei Super League: 2012–13

DPMM

- S.League: 2014 (runner-up), 2015
- Singapore Premier League: 2019
- Singapore League Cup: 2014
- Brunei FA Cup: 2022

Brunei U21

- Hassanal Bolkiah Trophy: 2012

Individual

- Meritorious Service Medal (PJK; 2012)
- Brunei Super League top scorer: 2012–13
- S.League Young Player of the Year: 2015

== Personal life ==
Azwan's brother Abdul Azizi is a former Brunei international footballer. Hendra Azam Idris of Indera SC is his cousin.
