= 2022 AFF Championship qualification =

Brunei	Timor-Leste
(Brunei)	(Timor-Leste)
6	3
- on aggregate

First leg
Brunei	Timor-Leste
6	2
- Date: 5 November 2022
- Venue: Track & Field Sports Complex, Bandar Seri Begawan, Brunei
- Referee: Warintorn Sassadee (Thailand)

Second leg
Timor-Leste	Brunei
1	0
- Date: 8 November 2022
- Venue: Track & Field Sports Complex, Bandar Seri Begawan, Brunei
- Referee: Razlan Joffri Ali (Malaysia)

The 2022 AFF Championship qualification tournament was the qualification process for the 2022 AFF Championship, the fourteenth edition of the AFF Championship. Brunei and Timor-Leste contested the tenth and lone remaining berth for the AFF Championship final tournament in two home-and-away matches. Brunei hosted both legs, due to Timor Leste not having a suitable venue.

Brunei secured qualification by defeating Timor-Leste 6–3 on aggregate, marking their second appearance in the final tournament after a 26-year absence since its inaugural edition.

== Venue ==
(Brunei) Bandar Seri Begawan
Track & Field Sports Complex
Capacity: 1,700
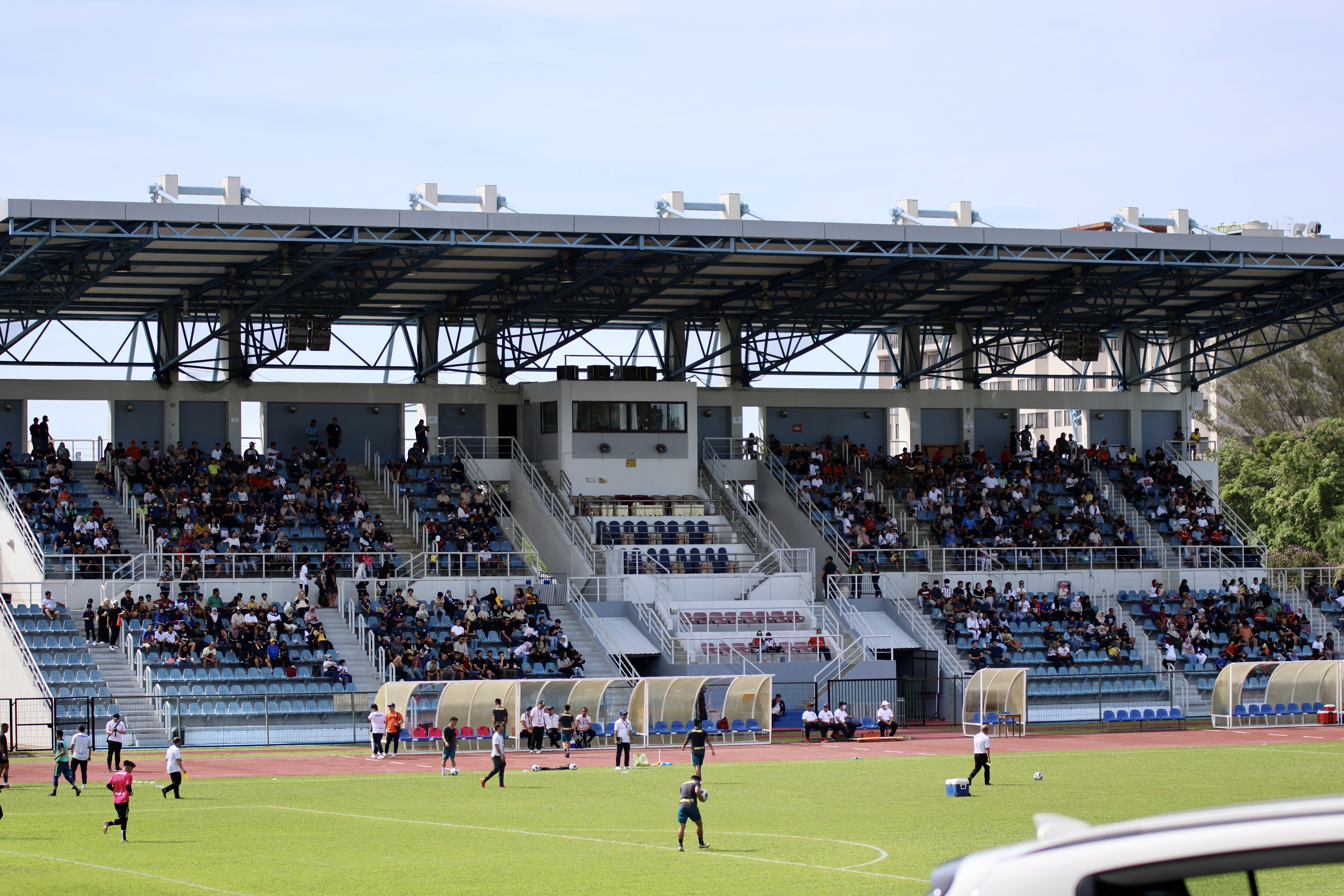

== Qualification ==
5 November 2022
15:45 UTC+8

Brunei	6–2	Timor-Leste
Azizi 18', 33'; Razimie 60', 90+3'; Azwan 75'; Wafi 89'	Report	Mouzinho 45+1'; Firth 65'

Track & Field Sports Complex, Bandar Seri Begawan
Attendance: 600
Referee: Warintorn Sassadee (Thailand)

Brunei	Timor-Leste

8 November 2022
14:30 UTC+8

Timor-Leste	1–0	Brunei
Mouzinho 45+2'	Report

Track & Field Sports Complex, Bandar Seri Begawan
Attendance: 1,207
Referee: Razlan Joffri Ali (Malaysia)

Timor-Leste	Brunei

Brunei won 6–3 on aggregate.

== Goalscorers ==
2 goals

- (Brunei) Abdul Azizi Ali Rahman
- (Brunei) Razimie Ramlli
- (Timor-Leste) Mouzinho

1 goal

- (Brunei) Azwan Saleh
- (Brunei) Wafi Aminuddin
- (Timor-Leste) Jhon Firth
