= 2005–06 Brunei Premier League =

Brunei Premier League
- Season: 2005–06

Statistics of Brunei Premier League for the 2005–06 season.

== Overview ==
It was contested by 10 teams, and QAF FC won the championship.

== League standings ==
Pos	Team	Pld	W	D	L	GF	GA	GD	Pts	Qualification
1	QAF FC	16	13	2	1	69	26	+43	41	Champions
2	MS ABDB	16	12	3	1	67	20	+47	39	
3	AH United	16	12	2	2	65	17	+48	38	
4	Wijaya FC	16	8	5	3	33	21	+12	29	
5	NBT FC	16	6	1	9	26	35	−9	19	
6	Kasuka FC	16	4	3	9	23	50	−27	15	
7	Jerudong FC	16	3	2	11	23	45	−22	11	
8	Indera FC	16	3	1	12	25	70	−45	10	Relegation Playoff
9	Bandaran	16	1	1	14	27	74	−47	4	Relegated
–	DPMM FC	~~12~~	~~11~~	~~0~~	~~1~~	~~56~~	~~4~~	—	0	Withdrew, results annulled

Source: rsssf.com
