= 2011 Brunei Premier League =

Brunei Premier League
- Season: 2011

The 2011 Brunei Premier League, also known as 2010/11 DST Group Brunei Premier League I, was the seventh season of the Brunei Premier League. It was the second season that was administered by the Football Federation of Brunei Darussalam (FFBD), the football association that replaced Football Association of Brunei Darussalam (BAFA) after the latter's de-registration by Brunei's Registrar of Societies.

The season was abruptly ended in June 2011 due to the establishment of the National Football Association of Brunei Darussalam (NFABD) which is the sole association recognised by FIFA to oversee Brunei football after lifting the ban, thus invalidating the current league.

== Standings ==
Up to 14 May 2011.

Pos	Team	Pld	W	D	L	GF	GA	GD	Pts
1	MS ABDB	8	7	1	0	28	6	+22	22
2	AM Gunners FC	8	5	1	2	27	18	+9	16
3	Majra FC	8	4	2	2	16	10	+6	14
4	QAF FC	8	4	2	2	21	16	+5	14
5	Indera FC	7	3	2	2	14	13	+1	11
6	Jerudong FC	8	2	2	4	14	20	−6	8
7	Wijaya FC	7	2	0	5	10	21	−11	6
8	KKSJ Penjara	8	1	1	6	11	22	−11	4
9	LLRC FT	8	1	1	6	6	21	−15	4
10	AH United	0	0	0	0	0	0	0	0
