= 2012 AFF Championship qualification =

Tournament details
- Host country: Myanmar
- Dates: 5–13 October 2012
- Teams: 5 (from 1 sub-confederation)
- Venue: 1 (in 1 host city)

Tournament statistics
- Matches played: 10
- Goals scored: 30 (3 per match)
- Top scorer(s): (Myanmar) Kyi Lin (Timor-Leste) Adelino Trindade (Timor-Leste) Alan Leandro (Timor-Leste) Murilo de Almeida (3 goals each)

The 2012 AFF Championship qualification tournament was the qualification process for the 2012 AFF Championship, the ninth edition of the ASEAN Football Championship. It was held in Yangon, Myanmar from 5 to 13 October 2012, and involved the five lower ranked teams in Southeast Asia. The format was a single round-robin tournament with the top two teams qualifying for the tournament proper.

Brunei made a comeback, after being re-instated towards the end of May 2011 by FIFA, following their suspension since September 2009. While the Philippines were one of the six seeded teams and gained direct entry to the main tournament, after reaching the semi-finals for the first time in the 2010 edition. They replaced Myanmar, who finished bottom of their group in 2010 and will be entering the qualification phase for the first time since 1998.

== Venue ==
Yangon
Thuwunna Stadium
Capacity: 32,000
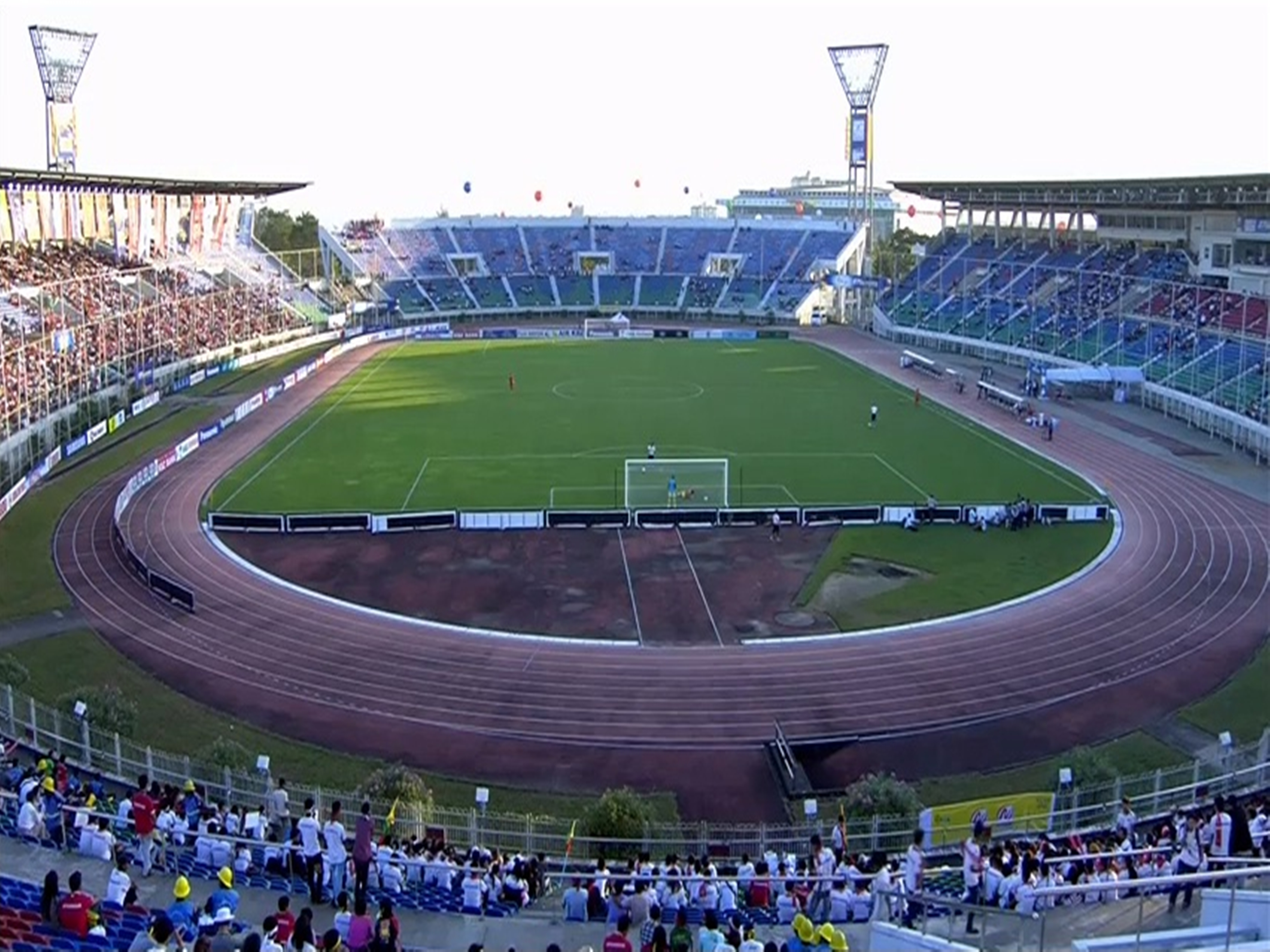

== Fixtures ==
All times listed are local (UTC+6:30).

Key to colours in group tables
| Group winner and runner-up qualify for the final tournament |

| Pos | Team | Pld | W | D | L | GF | GA | GD | Pts | Qualification |
|---|---|---|---|---|---|---|---|---|---|---|
| 1 | Myanmar (H) | 4 | 3 | 1 | 0 | 6 | 1 | +5 | 10 | AFF Championship |
| 2 | Laos | 4 | 2 | 1 | 1 | 5 | 4 | +1 | 7 | AFF Championship |
| 3 | Timor-Leste | 4 | 2 | 0 | 2 | 10 | 6 | +4 | 6 | |
| 4 | Brunei | 4 | 2 | 0 | 2 | 6 | 7 | −1 | 6 | |
| 5 | Cambodia | 4 | 0 | 0 | 4 | 3 | 12 | −9 | 0 | |

Source: AFF
(H) Hosts
5 October 2012
15:00

| Cambodia | 1 – 5 | Timor-Leste |
|---|---|---|
| Sokngon 90+1' (pen.) | Report | Murilo 39', 44'; Ade 57', 73'; Alan 87' (pen.) |

Thuwunna Stadium, Yangon
Attendance: 500
Referee: Mukhtar Al Yarimi (Yemen)
5 October 2012
18:00

| Myanmar | 1 – 0 | Brunei |
|---|---|---|
| Yan Aung Win 84' | Report |

Thuwunna Stadium, Yangon
Attendance: 7,000
Referee: Ahmed Aslam (Maldives)

7 October 2012
15:00

| Timor-Leste | 1 – 2 | Myanmar |
|---|---|---|
| Alan 55' | Report | Kyi Lin 38', 73' |

Thuwunna Stadium, Yangon
Attendance: 8,000
Referee: Tayeb Shamsuzzaman (Bangladesh)
7 October 2012
18:00

| Laos | 1 – 0 | Cambodia |
|---|---|---|
| Phaphouvanin 40' | Report |

Thuwunna Stadium, Yangon
Attendance: 100
Referee: Abdulla Al-Zaabi (United Arab Emirates)

9 October 2012
15:00

| Cambodia | 2 – 3 | Brunei |
|---|---|---|
| Mony Udom 24'; Borey 90+2' | Report | Aminuddin 56'; Helmi 63'; Azwan S. 70' |

Thuwunna Stadium, Yangon
Referee: Hiroyoshi Takayama (Japan)
9 October 2012
18:00

| Timor-Leste | 3 – 1 | Laos |
|---|---|---|
| Murilo 43' (pen.); Ade 51'; Alan 83' | Report | Phaphouvanin 77' |

Thuwunna Stadium, Yangon
Referee: Ahmed Aslam (Maldives)

11 October 2012
15:00

| Brunei | 1 – 3 | Laos |
|---|---|---|
| Rosmin 26' | Report | Namthavixay 34'; Sayavutthi 61' (pen.); Sysomvang 83' (pen.) |

Thuwunna Stadium, Yangon
Referee: Tayeb Shamsuzzaman (Bangladesh)
11 October 2012
18:00

| Myanmar | 3 – 0 | Cambodia |
|---|---|---|
| Kyi Lin 59'; Kaung Sithu 65'; Pyae Phyo Aung 90+1' | Report |

Thuwunna Stadium, Yangon
Referee: Mukhtar Al Yarimi (Yemen)

13 October 2012
15:00

| Laos | 0 – 0 | Myanmar |
|---|---|---|
| | Report |

Thuwunna Stadium, Yangon
Referee: Abdulla Al-Zaabi (United Arab Emirates)
13 October 2012
18:00

| Brunei | 2 – 1 | Timor-Leste |
|---|---|---|
| Adi 16'; Azwan A. 76' | Report | Pinto 79' |

Thuwunna Stadium, Yangon
Referee: Hiroyoshi Takayama (Japan)

== Goal scorers ==
3 goals

- (Myanmar) Kyi Lin
- (Timor-Leste) Adelino Trindade
- (Timor-Leste) Alan Leandro
- (Timor-Leste) Murilo de Almeida

2 goals

- (Laos) Visay Phaphouvanin

1 goal

- (Brunei) Adi Said
- (Brunei) Md Aminuddin Zakwan Tahir
- (Brunei) Azwan Salleh
- (Brunei) Mohammad Helmi Zambin
- (Brunei) Muhammad Azwan Ali Rahman
- (Brunei) Rosmin Muhammad Kamis
- (Cambodia) Khim Borey
- (Cambodia) Prak Mony Udom
- (Cambodia) Keo Sokngon
- (Laos) Kovanh Namthavixay
- (Laos) Khampheng Sayavutthi
- (Laos) Kanlaya Sysomvang
- (Myanmar) Kaung Sithu
- (Myanmar) Pyae Phyo Aung
- (Myanmar) Yan Aung Win
- (Timor-Leste) Jesse Pinto
