= 2007–08 Brunei Premier League =

Brunei Premier League
- Season: 2007–08

Statistics of the Brunei Premier League for the 2007–08 season.

== Overview ==
It was contested by 12 teams, and QAF FC won the championship.

== League standings ==
Pos	Team	Pld	W	D	L	GF	GA	GD	Pts	Qualification or relegation
1	QAF FC	20	18	1	1	77	17	+60	55	Champions
2	MS ABDB	20	17	2	1	77	13	+64	53	
3	Majra FC	20	9	4	7	42	37	+5	31	
4	Jerudong FC	20	9	4	7	41	44	−3	31	
5	Wijaya FC	20	8	3	9	38	43	−5	27	
6	AH United	20	7	3	10	35	37	−2	24	
7	NBT FC	20	7	3	10	34	40	−6	24	
8	Indera FC	20	7	3	10	35	46	−11	24	
9	Brunei Shell FC	20	7	0	13	23	48	−25	21	
10	March United	20	5	0	15	34	65	−31	15	Relegation Playoff
11	Sengkurong FC	20	4	1	15	22	68	−46	13	Relegated
–	Kasuka FC	~~18~~	~~1~~	~~2~~	~~15~~	~~15~~	~~64~~	—	0	Withdrew, results annulled

Source: rsssf.com

== Promotion/relegation playoff ==
to be held before start 2009 season
March United n/p LLRC FT
NB: cancelled as top level is reduced to 10 clubs
