= 2015 Brunei Super League =

Brunei Super League
- Season: 2015
- Champions: MS ABDB
- Matches: 90
- Goals: 378 (4.2 per match)
- Top goalscorer: Hardi Bujang (18)

The 2015 Brunei Super League is the third season of the Brunei Super League. It is organized by the National Football Association of Brunei Darussalam and sponsored by DST Group.

On 23 October 2015, MS ABDB clinched the title with two games left to play. A 6–1 victory over Kilanas FC had put them 13 points ahead of second-placed Indera SC, guaranteeing the Armymen's first league title since 1985.

On 25 October 2015, the match between Tabuan Muda and Indera SC was initially ruled as a 3-0 walkover to Tabuan Muda after a third sending-off of an Indera player. However, this was against tournament rules (based on the Laws of the Game) which ruled that a match cannot continue with seven players in a team, and the referee of that match was deemed to have made an error of judgment. The match was scheduled to be replayed on 22 November, but this time Tabuan Muda did not field enough players for the match and thus resulted in a 3-0 walkover to Indera SC. Tabuan Muda were retrospectively fined BND$500 for their no-show in a statement by NFABD on 9 April 2016.

== Teams ==
- Indera SC
- MS ABDB (Royal Brunei Armed Forces SC)
- Najip I-Team
- MS PDB (Royal Brunei Police Forces SC)
- Wijaya FC
- Jerudong FC
- Kilanas FC
- Lun Bawang
- IKLS FC
- Tabuan Muda (Brunei U23)

== Stadiums and locations ==
Location	Stadium	Capacity
Bandar Seri Begawan	Hassanal Bolkiah National Stadium	28000
Bandar Seri Begawan	Belapan Track and Field	
Bandar Seri Begawan	Berakas Sports Complex	
Tutong	Tutong Sports Complex	

== Foreign players ==
Club	Player 1	Player 2
Indera SC	(England) Sam Ford	(Australia) Kane Moran
Jerudong FC	(Indonesia) Agus Haryono	-
Wijaya FC	(Australia) Ryan Moran	(Indonesia) Sigit Prasetia

== League standings ==
Pos	Team	Pld	W	D	L	GF	GA	GD	Pts	Qualification or relegation
1	MS ABDB (C)	18	16	1	1	55	12	+43	49	
2	Indera SC	18	13	3	2	54	19	+35	42	
3	Najip I-Team	18	12	0	6	35	32	+3	36	
4	Wijaya FC	18	9	4	5	46	34	+12	31	
5	Tabuan Muda	18	9	3	6	37	28	+9	30	
6	Jerudong FC	18	8	2	8	47	33	+14	26	
7	MS PDB	18	4	4	10	29	35	−6	16	
8	Lun Bawang	18	3	3	12	26	49	−23	12	
9	IKLS FC (R)	18	4	0	14	27	62	−35	12	Relegation to the 2016 Brunei Premier League
10	Kilanas FC (R)	18	2	0	16	22	74	−52	6	Relegation to the 2016 Brunei Premier League

Updated to match(es) played on 14 December 2015. Source: NFABD
Rules for classification: 1) points; 2) goal difference; 3) number of goals scored.
(C) Champions; (R) Relegated

== Top scorers ==
Rank	Player	Club	Goals
1	(Brunei) Hardi Bujang	Jerudong FC	18
2	(Brunei) Nur Syazwan Halidi	Tabuan Muda	16
3	(Brunei) Abdul Azizi Ali Rahman	MS ABDB	14
4	(Brunei) Azri Zahari	Najip I-Team	12
4	(Brunei) Razimie Ramlli	MS ABDB	12
6	(Brunei) Hamizan Aziz Sulaiman	Indera SC	11
7	(Brunei) Anaqi Sufi Omar Baqi	Wijaya FC	10
