= 2009–10 Brunei Premier League =

Brunei Premier League
- Season: 2009–10

2009 Brunei Premier League season (known as DST Group Brunei Premier League for sponsorship reasons, (Malay: DST GROUP LIGA PERDANA BRUNEI) was the sixth since its establishment in 2002. It was scheduled to begin on 25 May 2009. The season kicked off on 23 May 2009 with a Champions Cup between the defending league champions QAF FC and FA Cup holders MS ABDB.

== Standings ==
Pos	Team	Pld	W	D	L	GF	GA	GD	Pts	Qualification or relegation
1	QAF FC	18	15	2	1	60	16	+44	47	Champions
2	MS ABDB	18	14	3	1	57	13	+44	45	
3	AM Gunners FC	18	13	3	2	52	22	+30	42	
4	Jerudong FC	18	8	5	5	36	28	+8	29	
5	Majra FC	18	9	0	9	43	39	+4	27	
6	Indera FC	18	7	1	10	24	31	−7	22	
7	AH United	18	5	1	12	29	58	−29	16	
8	Wijaya FC	18	4	2	12	24	49	−25	14	
9	NBT FC	18	2	3	13	19	54	−35	9	Relegation Playoff
10	Brunei Shell FC	18	2	2	14	20	54	−34	8	Relegated

Source: rsssf.com

== Promotion/relegation playoff ==
Apr 13, Balapan Track and Field
NBT FC 1-5 KKSJ Penjara
[Hj Khairol Anwar Hj Md Yaakub 55; Hj Abd Hanis Hj Abd Rahim 22, Chua Kok Meng 39, Sharum Anik 45+1, Md Abu Bakar Mahari 57, 62]
NB: NBT FC relegated, Penjara promoted
