= QAF FC =

Brunei football club

- Full name: QAF FC
- Ground: Angkatan Persenjataan Diraja Stadium; Bandar Seri Begawan, Brunei
- Manager: (Brunei) Rahim Haji Daud
- Coach: (Brunei) Muhd Ali Haji Mustapa
- League: DST B-League
- 2014: 6th
Home colours	Away colours

QAF FC is a professional football club based in Bandar Seri Begawan, Brunei. The club won the Brunei League in 2006 when the DPMM FC had to withdraw because they play in the Malaysian Premier League, thus the QAF FC won the title. Their captain was Riwandi Wahit

== Achievements ==
- Brunei League: 3

2006, 2008, 2010

- Brunei League Cup: 2

2007–08, 2009

- Brunei Super Cup: 2

2007, 2008

- Asian Gold cup: 1

2011–12

They recently Plays as a Brunei national football team side in the 2010 AFC Challenge Cup qualification in Sri Lanka.

== Sponsors ==
- Brunei Shell

== Kit sponsors ==
- 1999–06: FELDOME Sport
- 2014: Lotto

== Current squad ==
Note: Flags indicate national team as defined under FIFA eligibility rules; some limited exceptions apply. Players may hold more than one non-FIFA nationality.

No.	Pos.	Nation	Player
1	GK	(Brunei) BRU	Junaidi Akim
2	MF	(Brunei) BRU	Mardi Anak Bujang
3	DF	(Brunei) BRU	Mohd Zulkhairi Haji Mohd Salleh
4	MF	(Brunei) BRU	Mohd Fadzry Haji Ibrahim
5	DF	(Brunei) BRU	Micky Anak Gindi
6	FW	(Brunei) BRU	Muhd Aqmal Hakeem Abdul Hamid
7	FW	(Brunei) BRU	Hamizan Aziz Sulaiman
8	MF	(Brunei) BRU	Mohd Hendra Azam Mohd Idris
9	FW	(Brunei) BRU	Riwandi Wahit
10	MF	(Brunei) BRU	Muhd Hardiman Abdul Lamit

No.	Pos.	Nation	Player
11	FW	(Cameroon) CMR	Viban Francis Bayong
14	MF	(Brunei) BRU	Nurul Aleshahnezan Vincent Anak Nordin
15	DF	(Cameroon) CMR	Christopher Ambon
17	MF	(Brunei) BRU	Awangku Mohd Kamarul Ariffin Pengiran Ramlee
19	MF	(Brunei) BRU	Ratano Haji Tuah
20	DF	(Brunei) BRU	Naasiruddeen Abdul Wahab
21	FW	(Brunei) BRU	Adie Arsham Muhd Salleh
23	DF	(Brunei) BRU	Awangku Muhd Hanis Marzuqi Pengiran Hasmali
25	GK	(Brunei) BRU	Muhd Shahshan Mumtazali
