= Hamzah Abdul Rahman =

Bruneian footballer (1973–2024)

Pengiran Hamzah
Personal information
- Full name: Pengiran Haji Hamzah bin Pengiran Haji Abdul Rahman
- Date of birth: 18 November 1973
- Place of birth: Brunei
- Date of death: 30 November 2024 (aged 51)
- Height: 5 ft 8 in (1.73 m)
- Position: Goalkeeper

Senior career*
Years	Team	Apps	(Gls)
1994–1997	Brunei		(0)
2003	Wijaya		(0)
2004–2009	DPMM		(0)

Managerial career
- 2016: MS ABDB
- * Club domestic league appearances and goals as of 17 April 2025

Pengiran Haji Hamzah bin Pengiran Haji Abdul Rahman (18 November 1973 – 30 November 2024) was a Bruneian football player and coach who played as a goalkeeper.

== Playing career ==
Hamzah began his footballing career for the Brunei representative team in the Malaysian league in 1994 as a reserve goalkeeper behind Ian Gray and Ibrahim Abu Bakar, coached by English and Everton legend Mick Lyons. He was unable to dislodge Ibrahim and Yunos Yusof in the Brunei side that turned from minnows to championship contenders near the turn of the century.

Hamzah played with Wijaya FC at the 2003 Brunei Premier League, winners of the first ever Brunei FA Cup the previous year. He made his debut at the 2003 Brunei Super Cup but lost 2–1 to 2002 B-League winners DPMM FC. Wijaya subsequently won the championship, the team only conceding three goals in nine games in the second round. He earned a move to DPMM FC in 2004, making his debut in the first round of the 2004 Singapore Cup against Woodlands Wellington in a 1–2 defeat. Domestically, DPMM comfortably won the league, going unbeaten in 18 games under Amir Alagic with Ajayi Oluseye and Peter Grierson bagging the majority of the goals. Later in the 2004 FA Cup final, Hamzah would have appeared in the game after Wardun Yussof was sent off in extra time but DPMM had used all three substitutions. Rosmin Kamis had to play in goal and saved two penalties in the resulting shootout to bring his club the domestic double, the first team to do so in Brunei. They were also on course to defending their title in the following season, but exited the competition after completing 12 matches to move to the Malaysia Premier League.

Playing in Malaysia from 2005 to 2008 and eventually Singapore in 2009, Hamzah and Wardun fought for their spot in the starting lineup until the latter eventually cemented his place as the number one. Towards the end of his career, Hamzah still managed a few competitive outings for DPMM, with the last of them coming in a 2–0 home victory against Woodlands Wellington on 8 August in the 2009 S.League.

== Coaching career ==
Hamzah had a stint in becoming head coach of the Royal Brunei Armed Forces Sports Council football team that won the domestic league and cup in 2015. He was hired by the national football association as goalkeeping coach for various youth groups of the national team since 2016.

Hamzah joined the backroom staff of Kasuka FC in 2023.

== Death ==
On 30 November 2024, Hamzah's death was announced by his employers Kasuka FC.

== Honours ==
=== Team ===
Wijaya FC

- B-League: 2003

DPMM FC

- Brunei Premier League: 2004
- Brunei FA Cup: 2004
- Singapore League Cup: 2009

=== Individual ===
- DPMM FC 2005 Player of the Year

== Personal life ==
Hamzah's son, Malique Haikal Khairuddin, is a goalkeeper who plays for the Kasuka under-18 youth team.
