= Shahrin Zaini =

Bruneian footballer (born 1985)

Personal information
- Full name: Mohammad Shahrin bin Zaini
- Date of birth: 26 April 1985 (age 41)
- Place of birth: Brunei
- Position: Defender

Youth career
- 2001: DPMM

Senior career*
Years	Team	Apps	(Gls)
2002–2004	DPMM		(8+)
2005	Brunei		(1)
2007–2010	Indera		
2015	Kota Ranger		(2)
2017–2018	Kasuka		(2)

International career^{‡}
2005	Brunei U21		
2008–2009	Brunei	1	(0)
- * Club domestic league appearances and goals as of 15 May 2025 ‡ National team caps and goals as of 15 May 2025

Mohammad Shahrin bin Zaini (born 26 April 1985) is a Bruneian former footballer who played as a defender. A founding member of royalty-owned local powerhouse DPMM FC, Shahrin was a Brunei Premier League champion in 2002 and 2004 as well as the Brunei FA Cup in 2004 with the club. He also appeared once for the national team in 2008.

== Club career ==
=== DPMM ===
Shahrin was one of the first two youth players developed by the Crown Prince's club DPMM in its history, the other being goalkeeper Azman Ilham Noor. Initially playing as a forward, Shahrin was in the starting lineup for the first ever match in B-League history, a 5–1 victory for DPMM FC against the Armed Forces on 7 July 2002 where he scored the second goal. He scored a brace in the next fixture against Kamudi FC and managed another goal against Kilanas FC later in the first round, but that was the extent of his goalscoring contributions in the 2002 season where his team became league champions.

Shahrin returned to the royalty-owned side in May 2003, scoring the winner in the first ever Brunei Super Cup against Brunei FA Cup inaugural winners Wijaya FC where Hamzah Abdul Rahman failed to keep out his long range effort towards the end of the first half in a 2–1 victory. Despite this, he was a bit-part player for DPMM's 2003 campaign where a defeat to ABDB in the final fixture of the season handed the championship to Wijaya.

Shahrin came to the fore in the following season as his seven league goals ensured DPMM reclaiming the championship. He also played in the FA Cup final on 8 January 2005 after scoring in the semifinal against Wijaya, and prevailed in a 3–1 win against ABDB, securing a league and cup double for Al-Muhtadee Billah's club. At the end of the season, he was declared the B-League Young Player of the Year.

=== Later career ===
When Amir Alagic moved from DPMM to become the head coach for the Brunei representative team playing in the Malaysian Premier League at the start of the 2005 Malaysia Premier League, he roped in Shahrin as one of several new faces in the Wasps squad taken from his DPMM team last season, alongside Shaiful Aznee Zaini, Saizan Kula, Shahruddin Tajuddin and Ajayi Oluseye. Shahrin started their first game of the season against Pulau Pinang NTFA on 6 February in a 5–1 win where Oluseye scored a hat-trick while Shahrin himself managed to put his name on the scoresheet. However, as the season progressed the Brunei team performed abysmally, managing only four points in six games which forced Alagic to resign. Things did not improve after Ranko Buketa took over and Brunei finished in fifth place out of 8 teams in the group. The Wasps completely withdrew the next season as DPMM took over as Bruneian representatives to the Malaysia Premier League.

Shahrin subsequently played for Indera SC from 2007 to 2010, converting into a defender. A break from football followed, until he was registered in mid-season for Kota Ranger FC playing in the 2015 Brunei Premier League. After winning the league and subsequent promotion to the Brunei Super League, Shahrin transferred to Kasuka FC and played one final campaign in the 2017–18 season.

== International career ==
Shahrin was a squad member of the Brunei under-21 team that competed at the 2005 Hassanal Bolkiah Trophy on home soil. The Young Wasps exited the tournament at the group stage due to goal difference.

In May 2008, Shahrin was called up to the Brunei national team by Korean head coach Kwon Oh-son for the 2008 AFC Challenge Cup qualification matches held in Iloilo City, Philippines. He started the first group match against the hosts but suffered a major injury in the 78th minute that kept him out for the rest of the tournament.

A year later, Shahrin was invited into the QAF FC squad who were representing the national team for the 2010 AFC Challenge Cup qualification matches in Sri Lanka in April 2009 but saw no game time.

== Honours ==
DPMM FC

- Brunei Premier League (2): 2002, 2004
- Brunei FA Cup: 2004
- Brunei Super Cup: 2003

Kota Ranger

- Brunei Premier League: 2015

Individual

- B-League Young Player of the Year: 2004
