= Helme Panjang =

Bruneian footballer, midfield

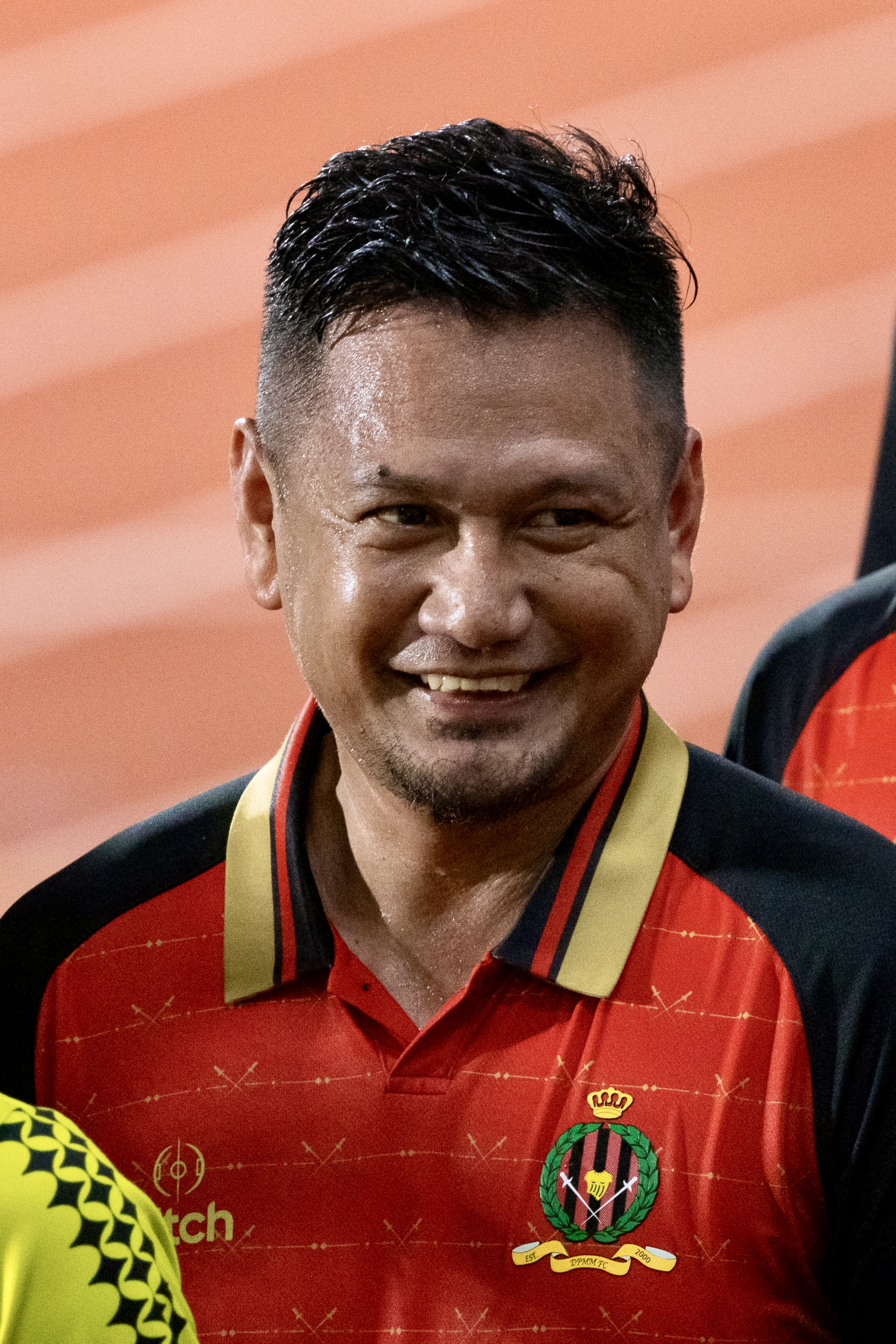
- Helme in 2024

Personal information
- Full name: Mohammad Helme bin Panjang
- Date of birth: 24 May 1983 (age 43)
- Place of birth: Brunei
- Position: Midfielder

Team information
- Current team: DPMM (Assistant Coach)

Senior career*
Years	Team	Apps	(Gls)
2001–2008	DPMM		
2015–2016	Kasuka		(2)
2017–2019	Lun Bawang		(3)

International career
2001	Brunei	4	(0)
2002	Brunei U20		
2005	Brunei U21		

Managerial career
- 2022: DPMM
- 2023–2025: DPMM II
- 2025–: DPMM (assistant)
- 2026–: Brunei
- * Club domestic league appearances and goals

Mohammad Helme bin Panjang (born 24 May 1983) is a Bruneian retired footballer who played as a midfielder and is currently the assistant coach of Malaysia Super League club DPMM and head coach of the Brunei national football team. He made four appearances for the Brunei national football team in 2001.

== Club career ==
Helme was one of the first players signed to DPMM, the club founded by Prince Al-Muhtadee Billah, even before the Brunei Premier League was created. He exclusively played for DPMM throughout their four-year local stint, winning two B-League championships, one FA Cup and two Super Cups, and in addition becoming the B-League Young Player of the Year in 2002. He also briefly captained the side in the absence of Ali Momin before later relinquishing it to Rosmin Kamis.

DPMM replaced the Brunei national representative team that competed in the Malaysian Premier League starting from the 2005–06 season. With former Brunei coach Ranko Buketa favouring the likes of Rosmin Kamis and Yussof Salleh over Helme, he found limited opportunities under the Croatian head coach, mostly appearing from the substitutes' bench. His side gained promotion and was even placed third in their top-flight debut, but Helme had minimal input. It was only when Yordan Stoykov took over in the 2007–08 season that Helme saw more game time. Ultimately, in a tumultuous period for DPMM which saw them move to the Singaporean league and then subject to a FIFA ban, Helme was not retained for the 2009 season, instead being replaced by namesake Helmi Zambin.

After a few years away from the game, Helme joined Kasuka, a reformed team that were to compete in the Brunei Premier League in 2015. He gained promotion with Kasuka and played with them for another season in the Brunei Super League until transferring to Temburong-based side Lun Bawang in 2017.

== International career ==
Due to eye-catching performances for DPMM in local tournaments, Zainuddin Kassim drafted Helme into the national squad for the 2002 FIFA World Cup qualifying matches to be held in April–May 2001. Helme was in the starting lineup for four of the games, all ending in defeats.

Helme also played for the Brunei U20 at the 2002 AFC Youth Championship qualification matches in South Korea in March 2002, as well as Brunei U21 at the 2005 Hassanal Bolkiah Trophy.

== Coaching career ==
In July 2022, Helme was appointed head coach of DPMM for the 2022 Brunei FA Cup, occupying the seat made vacant by Adrian Pennock becoming the first local to take charge of the club in their history. He coached DPMM all the way to the final of the competition on 4 December. His team were victorious against Kasuka in that final, bringing DPMM's second FA Cup triumph which Helme first won as a player in 2004.

Helme was assigned to coach the DPMM under-20s playing in the Brunei Youth League U20 from 2023. He managed to take the youngsters to become the competition's champions in March 2024, while also winning the Best Coach of the League award.

At the start of the 2024–25 Brunei Super League, it was announced that DPMM would be entering a second team to the league, which was composed of mostly the under-20 team that was led by Helme. His team played 12 games without dropping a single point, and led the table in their final fixture against Kasuka, where they were beaten 2–3 to surrender the title to the defending champions. Later in the season, Helme took DPMM II to domestic cup glory, beating Indera SC 1–0 in the final on 18 May.

At the start of the 2025–26 season, Helme became assistant to first-team head coach Jamie McAllister in their Malaysia Super League campaign.

In June 2026, the Football Association of Brunei Darussalam appointed Helme as head coach of the Brunei national team.

== Honours ==
=== As player ===
DPMM

- Brunei Premier League (2): 2002, 2004
- Brunei FA Cup: 2004
- Brunei Super Cup: 2003, 2005

=== As head coach ===
DPMM

- Brunei FA Cup (2): 2022, 2025
- Brunei Youth League U20: 2023–24
- Brunei Super League: 2024–25 (runners-up)

=== Individual ===
- B-League Young Player of the Year: 2002
- Brunei Youth League U20 Best Coach of the League: 2023–24
