= Subhi Bakir =

Bruneian footballer

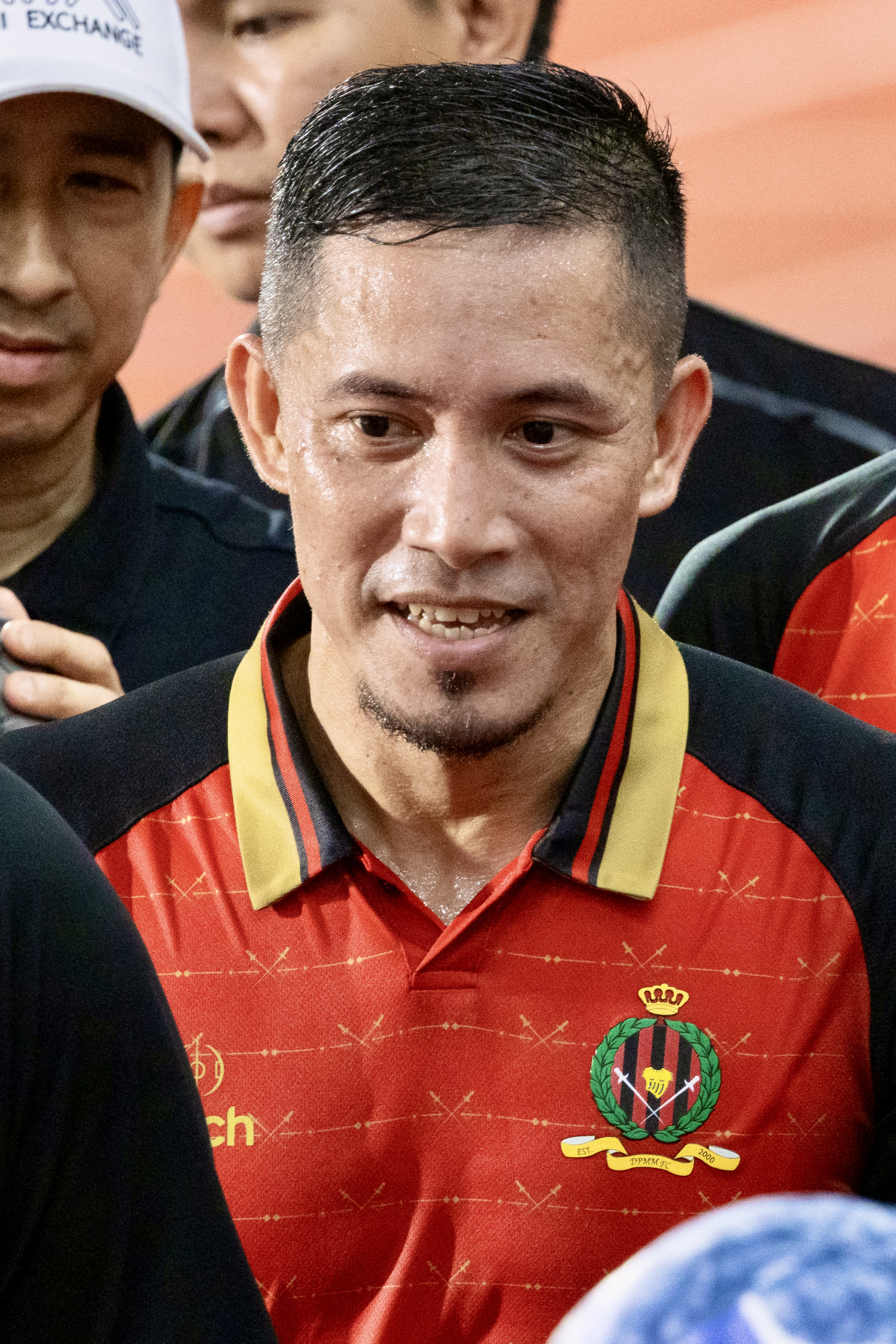
- Subhi in 2024

Personal information
- Full name: Haji Muhammad Subhi Abdillah bin Haji Bakir
- Date of birth: 8 April 1980 (age 46)
- Place of birth: Brunei
- Height: 1.72 m (5 ft 8 in)
- Positions: Midfielder; right wing-back

Youth career
- Wijaya

Senior career*
Years	Team	Apps	(Gls)
2000–2004	Brunei		(24)
2002–2005	Wijaya		
2006–2014	DPMM	88+	(4)
2010–2011	→ AM Gunners (loan)		
2015	Wijaya		(3)

International career
2001	Brunei U23	2	(0)
2003–2014	Brunei	8	(0)
- * Club domestic league appearances and goals

Haji Muhammad Subhi Abdillah bin Haji Bakir (born 8 April 1980) is a Bruneian former footballer who played most notably for the Brunei M-League representative team and DPMM FC as a right midfielder or right wing-back.

== Club career ==
Subhi began playing for the Brunei representative team in 2000. He was one of a number of players drafted into the team to replace several veterans who retired immediately after winning the 1999 Malaysia Cup. When DPMM FC replaced his team in the Malaysia Premier League in 2005, he joined Wijaya FC for the 2005–06 Brunei Premier League. He moved to DPMM in 2006, gaining promotion to the Malaysia Super League in his first season and finishing third in the following season.

Subhi would next experience an eventful three years with DPMM, influenced by the deregistration of BAFA by the Registrar of Societies, prompting FIFA to suspend Brunei in 2009. Altogether, Subhi played in Malaysia in 2008, Singapore in 2009 and Brunei in 2010 on loan at AM Gunners.

Subhi was an integral player to DPMM after they returned to the S.League in 2012. He amassed 61 appearances in 3 seasons, winning the Singapore League Cup again twice in 2012 and 2014 to add to the one in 2009. He left DPMM in 2015 to play one last season with his youth club Wijaya FC, alongside fellow veteran Shahrul Rizal Abdul Rahman.

== International career ==
Subhi was the captain of the Brunei Under-23 team that competed at the 2001 SEA Games held in Kuala Lumpur, Malaysia. He made his international debut in March 2003 at the 2004 AFC Asian Cup qualification matches against Maldives and Myanmar.

Subhi's next involvement with the Wasps came at the 2008 AFF Suzuki Cup qualifying round when his then club DPMM was sent to Cambodia as the national team. He played twice for the Wasps in 2014 also for the Suzuki Cup qualifying held in Laos.

== Honours ==
Wijaya FC

- Brunei FA Cup: 2003
- Brunei Super Cup: 2003

Brunei DPMM FC

- Singapore League Cup (3): 2009, 2012, 2014

== Personal life ==
Subhi works as a surveyor at the Survey Department under the Ministry of Development.
