= Norsillmy Taha =

Bruneian footballer

Abang Nor Sillmy bin Abang Haji Taha
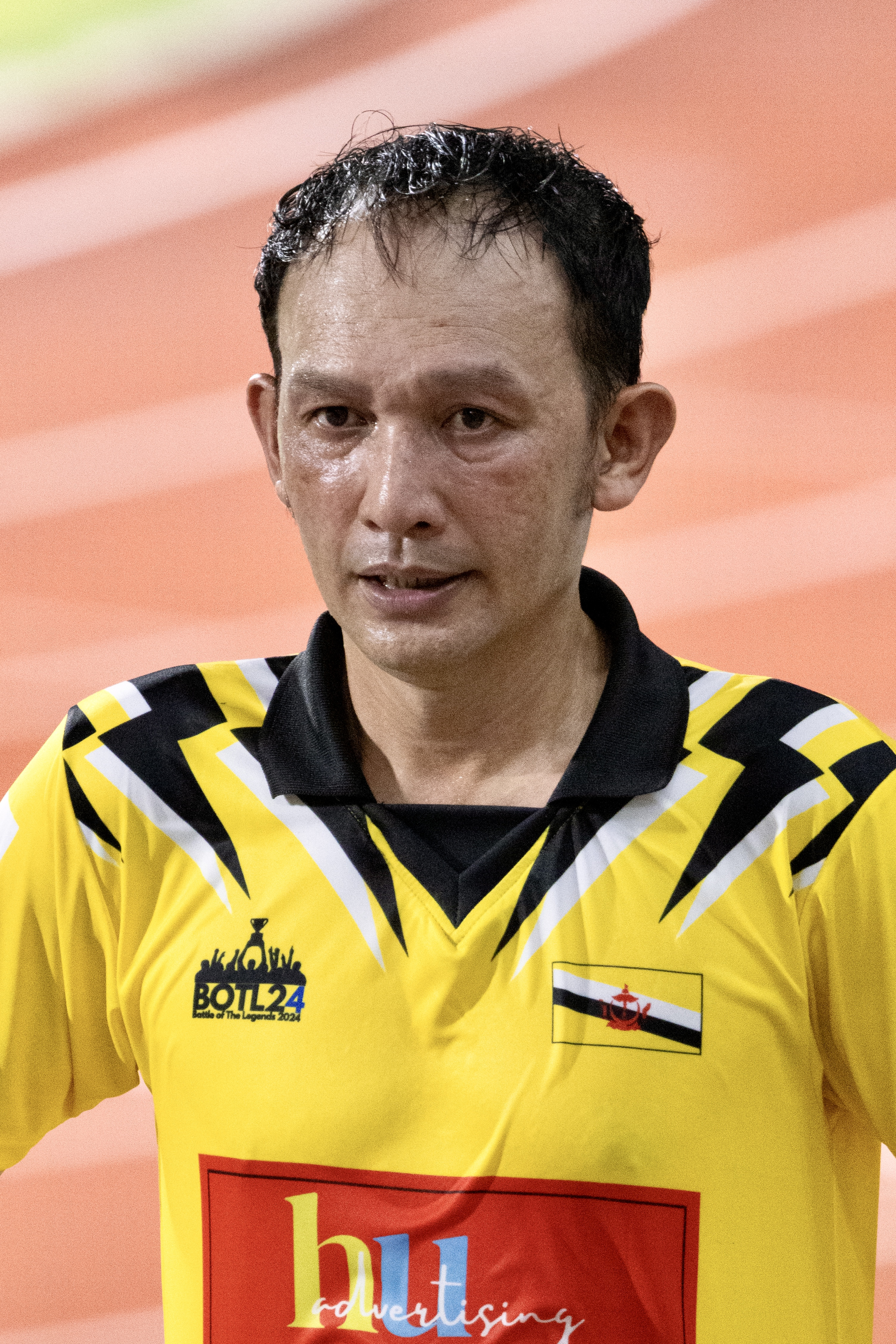
- Nor Sillmy in 2024

Personal information
- Full name: Abang Nor Sillmy bin Abang Haji Taha
- Date of birth: 11 August 1978 (age 48)
- Place of birth: Brunei
- Positions: Defender; striker

Senior career*
Years	Team	Apps	(Gls)
1999–2005	Brunei		(22)
2002–2008	Wijaya		
2009–2010	Jerudong		
2011–2012	DPMM	0	(0)
2012–2013	Majra		(4)
2014	Najip		(8)
2015–2016	Kota Ranger		(15)
2022	Ar Rawda		(1)

International career^{‡}
1994	Brunei U19		
1999–2003	Brunei	14	(0)
- * Club domestic league appearances and goals as of 4 October 2024 ‡ National team caps and goals as of 27 March 2017

Abang Nor Sillmy bin Abang Haji Taha (born 11 August 1978) is a Bruneian retired footballer. He was a member of the Brunei national representative team for the Malaysian league that won the 1999 Malaysia Cup. He is a versatile player who has played at various positions throughout his career.

== Club career ==
=== Brunei ===
Initially a central defender, Norsillmy was a relative newcomer to the Brunei squad that was competing in the Malaysian M-League in 1999, coached by Englishman David Booth. Although they finished seventh in Premier One, they began a hot streak in the subsequent Malaysia Cup campaign which concluded with winning the silverware, Brunei's first in 20 years of participation. Norsillmy played in that final, a 2–1 victory over Sarawak hosted at the Merdeka Stadium in Kuala Lumpur.

Due to the restriction of import players in the following season, then coach Mick Jones started to place Norsillmy in attack, complimenting the diminutive Riwandi Wahit in a little-and-large combination. Both of them only managed to score five goals each as the lack of foreign firepower condemned Brunei to the foot of the table and relegation to Premier Two.

Norsillmy stayed with the Wasps until the 2004 season, scoring 22 goals in the role of a striker.

=== Later career ===
Norsillmy played for Wijaya FC in the domestic B-League, winning the 2002 FA Cup and the 2003 championship. In fact, he scored the solitary winning goal against MS ABDB in the first FA Cup final. He left Wijaya for Jerudong FC in 2009, then accepted an invitation to train and possibly play for Brunei's professional club DPMM FC in late 2011, in view of the 2012 S.League. Despite putting pen to paper on a professional contract, he failed the mandatory fitness test required by the S.League and failed to make his debut for the Gegar Gegar men.

Norsillmy joined ambitious Majra FC at the start of the 2012–13 Brunei Super League and finished third in the new league. He moved to Najip FC in the following season, one of several big names to join the club that did not gain a single point the season before. His brief but fruitful stay led Najip FC to third-place in the league as well as an FA Cup final appearance.

Norsillmy dropped a division in 2015, joining Kota Ranger FC in the Brunei Premier League, and finished in first place unbeaten. Promotion to the 2016 Brunei Super League ensued, and he scored five goals to finish second in the goalscoring charts, despite his club only managing a sixth-place finish.

== International career ==
In May 1994, Norsillmy travelled to Kuala Lumpur with the Brunei under-19s for the 1994 AFC Youth Championship qualifying group matches and managed to score against Singapore.

Norsillmy made his international debut for the Brunei national team on 2 August 1999 against Cambodia in a 3–3 draw at the 20th SEA Games hosted by his home country. He gained 14 caps for the Wasps, his final tournament being the 2004 AFC Asian Cup qualification games against Maldives and Myanmar in March 2003.

== Honours ==
=== Team ===
Brunei

- Malaysia Cup: 1999

Wijaya FC

- B-League: 2003
- Brunei FA Cup: 2002
- Brunei Super Cup: 2003

Kota Ranger

- Brunei Premier League: 2015

=== Individual ===
- Meritorious Service Medal (PJK; 1999)

== Personal life ==
Nor Sillmy's brother, Nor Hillmy Taha is a football coach who is head coach for Deno FC. His nephew Abang Nur Hilman bin Abang Nor Hillmy is a goalkeeper who plays for Rimba Star FC.

Norsillmy works at the Survey Department at the Ministry of Development of Brunei.
