= Ali Momin =

Bruneian footballer and executive

Ali Haji Momin
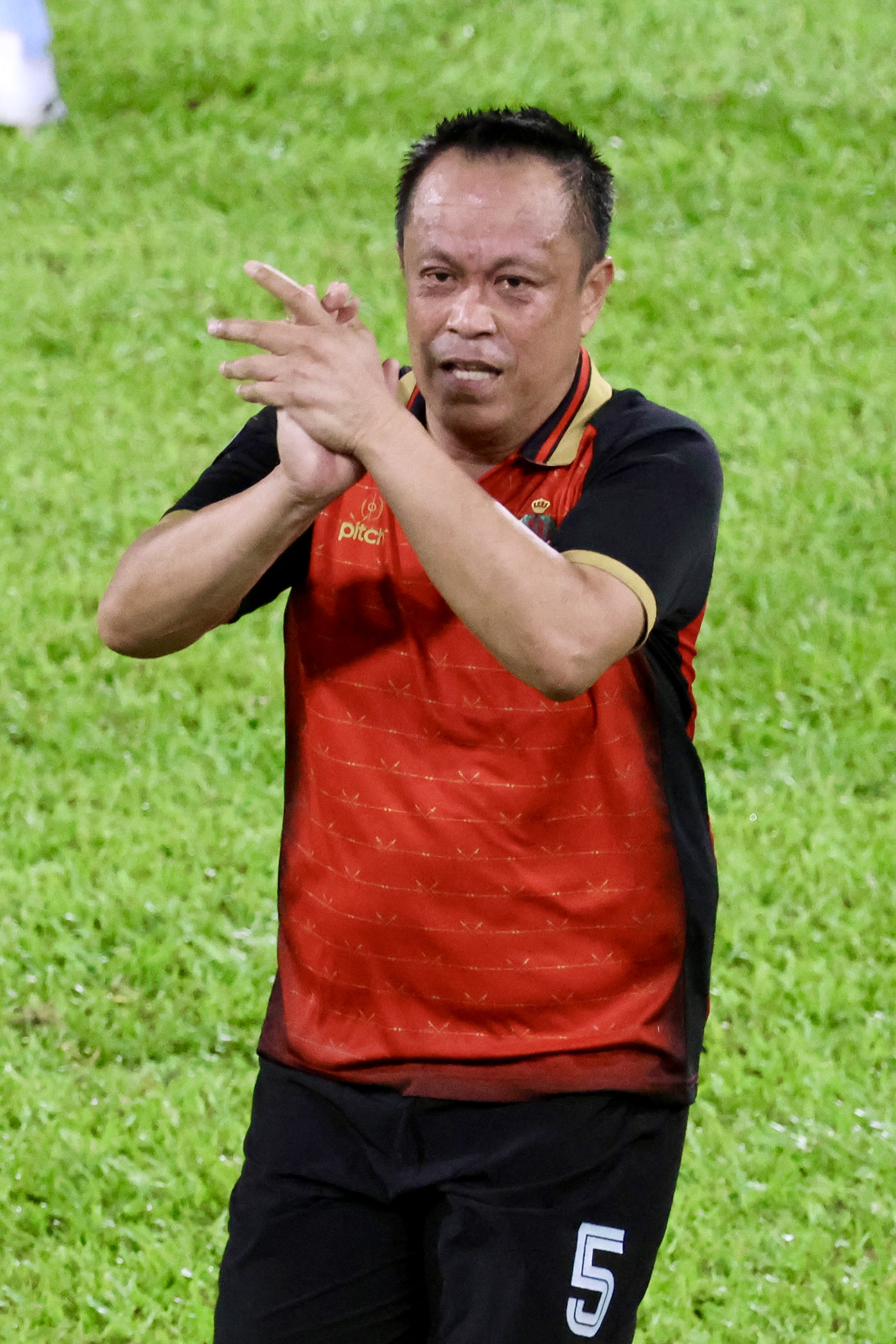
- Ali in 2024

Personal information
- Full name: Mohammad Ali bin Haji Momin
- Date of birth: 6 February 1973 (age 53)
- Place of birth: Brunei
- Positions: Defender; midfielder

Senior career*
| Years | Team | Apps | (Gls) |
| 1996–1999 | Brunei | | |
| 2000–2004 | DPMM | | |

International career^{‡}
| 1997–2002 | Brunei | 13+ | (0) |

Managerial career
- 2012–: DPMM (team manager)
- * Club domestic league appearances and goals as of 3 July 2023 ‡ National team caps and goals as of 3 July 2023

Mohammad Ali bin Haji Momin (born 6 February 1973) is a retired Bruneian footballer who played as a defender or midfielder. Once part of the Brunei M-League representative team, he is currently the team manager of DPMM FC.

== Club career ==
Ali was a squad member of the Brunei team playing in the Malaysian leagues from 1996 to 1999. On his final season with the Wasps, Brunei won the Malaysian Cup.

Afterwards, Ali played for DPMM FC, a team founded by Prince Al-Muhtadee Billah where he is one of its founding members. Serving as captain, DPMM FC became one of the strongest teams in the country, winning the B-League championship in 2002 and 2004. After retirement, he stayed on with DPMM as backroom staff and eventually became the team manager from 2012.

== International career ==
Ali played every match for the national team at the 20th SEA Games held in his country. He was also ever-present for Brunei at the 2000 AFC Asian Cup qualification round and the 2002 World Cup qualifying.

== Honours ==
=== Team ===
Brunei FA

- Malaysia Cup: 1999

DPMM FC

- DPMM FC Invitational Cup: 2002
- B-League: 2002, 2004
- Brunei FA Cup: 2004
- Brunei Super Cup: 2003, 2004

=== Individual ===
- Meritorious Service Medal (PJK; 1999)
