= Ajayi Oluseye =

Nigerian association football player and coach

Personal information
- Full name: Ajayi Oluseye
- Date of birth: 12 April 1975 (age 51)
- Place of birth: Lagos, Nigeria
- Position: Striker

Senior career*
Years	Team	Apps	(Gls)
1992–1993	Shooting Stars		
1994–1995	Julius Berger		
1996–2001	Al-Seeb Club		
2001	→ DPMM FC (loan)		
2002–2005	DPMM FC		(65)
2005	Brunei		(4)

Managerial career
- 2023–2025: Osun United
- * Club domestic league appearances and goals as of 20 April 2021

Ajayi Oluseye (born 12 April 1975) is a Nigerian former football player and current coach. He played professionally in Oman, Brunei and Malaysia.

== Career ==
Oluseye started his playing career as a striker at Shooting Stars S.C. before transferring to Al-Seeb Club of Oman, where he reportedly became the top scorer in the 1999–2000 Omani League and helped his team finish in third place. He attended trials held by newly established DPMM FC of Brunei in early 2001 and signed full terms the following year, just in time for the inaugural 2002 Proton B-League. He scored seven goals before succumbing to an injury suffered at a friendly tournament between rounds, forcing a premature end to his season.

Oluseye was back to Brunei for the 2003 B-League and started some hot form which would last for two seasons. He first scored four goals against IBM Bukok in an 11-0 routing of the Temburong District side on 30 May, followed by a first-half hattrick against Jerudong FC on 4 July. Having been made captain by the club and tasting regional club football at the 2003 ASEAN Club Championship, Oluseye led the goalscoring charts and finished with 28 goals, yet failed to defend the league title due to a 1–3 defeat by the Armed Forces which handed the championship to unbeaten Wijaya FC.

Oluseye began the 2004 season by smashing a 23-minute hattrick against defending champions Wijaya on 9 May, eager to prove a point. His next outing was against Kasuka FC on 11 June, when he repeated his three-goal haul in a 7–0 victory. Five days later, Sengkurong FC were the third victims of Oluseye's triple prowess. It was not until 25 August that he scored his fourth hattrick of the season against Kota Ranger, with DPMM running away as 11-0 winners. A fifth hattrick of the season came against QAF FC near the end of the season and DPMM ended their campaign as unbeaten champions with Oluseye reaching the 30-goal mark. He also managed to get a Brunei FA Cup winner's medal by beating MS ABDB 3–1 on penalties in the final match, scoring the winning penalty.

When DPMM's domestic double-winning coach Amir Alagic took the reins of the Brunei representative team playing in Malaysia's second tier, Oluseye was brought to the team as their import player. A hat-trick in his debut brought hope to a languishing Brunei side fighting to keep attendances, but eventually the team suffered poor form and lost their final four games and finished in mid-table. Ajayi quietly left Brunei after the season's end and studied for his coaching badges in his native Lagos, eventually becoming head coach of Premier Football Academy in 2015.

In early 2023, he was announced as the new head coach of Osun United. Under Oluseye, the once amateur team won promotion to the Nigeria National League, and managed to finish second in the 2024–25 season to qualify for the playoffs for a place in the 2025–26 Nigeria Premier Football League. Osun would lose the playoff place to Kun Khalifat FC, and Oluseye resigned from his post shortly after.

== Honours ==
=== Team ===
Shooting Stars SC

- Oyo State FA Cup (2): 1992, 1993
- CAF Cup: 1992

Julius Berger FC

- Lagos State FA Cup: 1994

Al Seeb Club

- Sultan Qaboos Cup (3): 1996, 1997, 1998

DPMM FC

- Brunei Premier League (2): 2002, 2004
- Brunei FA Cup: 2004
- Brunei Super Cup: 2002
- Brunei Invitational Cup: 2002

=== Individual ===
- 1999–2000 Omani League Top Scorer
- 2003 Brunei Premier League Golden Boot - 28 goals
- 2004 Brunei Premier League Golden Boot - 30 goals
