= Anaqi Sufi Omar Baki =

Bruneian footballer

Personal information
- Full name: Pengiran Anaqi Sufi bin Pengiran Haji Omar Baki
- Date of birth: 22 July 1990 (age 36)
- Place of birth: Brunei
- Position: Midfielder

Team information
- Current team: Wijaya FC
- Number: 8

Senior career*
Years	Team	Apps	(Gls)
2008–2011	AM Gunners		
2012–2020	Wijaya		(40)
2026–	Wijaya	5	(2)

International career^{‡}
2012	Brunei U21	0	(0)
2015	Brunei	2	(0)
- * Club domestic league appearances and goals as of 8 November 2026 ‡ National team caps and goals as of 25 October 2017

Pengiran Anaqi Sufi bin Pengiran Haji Omar Baki (born 22 July 1990) is a Bruneian footballer who plays as a midfielder for Brunei Super League club Wijaya FC. He played for the Brunei national football team on two occasions.

== Club career ==
A free kick specialist by trade, Anaqi began his footballing career with AM Gunners of the Brunei Premier League, the club that was headed by Prince Abdul Mateen. He scored the winner against Indera SC to send the Gunners to the semi-finals of the 2010 FA Cup, only to be beaten by MS ABDB through a late winner by Safari Wahit.

Anaqi moved to Wijaya FC in 2012, and played there until 2020.

On 9 January 2018, Anaqi scored four goals in the DST FA Cup second round fixture against BSRC FT, the fourth being a direct free-kick.

Fron 2022 to 2026, Anaqi played in the national futsal league with BIBD SRC. In September 2026, he returned to the football pitch with his old club Wijaya, and scored in their second fixture in the 2026–27 Brunei Super League, in a 2–1 defeat to KB FC on the 20th of that month.

== International career ==
Anaqi Sufi was a squad member of the Brunei under-21 team that lifted the Hassanal Bolkiah Trophy in 2012.

Anaqi Sufi was called up to the full Brunei squad in March 2015 for the 2018 World Cup qualifiers against Chinese Taipei. He made his international debut as a substitute in the second leg held in Bandar Seri Begawan where Brunei squandered their first leg away victory with a 0–2 defeat which eliminated them from the 2018 FIFA World Cup. He made another appearance for the Wasps at a friendly against Singapore the following June.

== Personal life ==
Besides football, Anaqi Sufi has also represented Brunei in international futsal in 2012. His father, Pengiran Omar Baki Pengiran Japar, is a national chess exponent with a FIDE rating of 1780.

== Honours ==
- Meritorious Service Medal (PJK; 2012)
