= Feisal Eusoff =

Bruneian footballer and manager

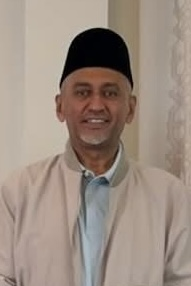
- Feisal in 2024

Personal information
- Full name: Haji Feisal bin Haji Mohammad Eusoff Patail
- Date of birth: 1967 (age 58–59)
- Place of birth: Brunei
- Position: Midfielder

Senior career*
Years	Team	Apps	(Gls)
1985–1993	Brunei		
- Armed Forces

International career
1985–1993	Brunei	1+	(0+)

Managerial career
- 2012–2014: Brunei U21 (team manager)
- 2012: Brunei (team manager)
- 2013: Brunei U23 (team manager)
President of the Football Association of Brunei Darussalam
In office 17 December 2023 – 23 November 2024
Preceded by	Pengiran Matusin
Succeeded by	Siti Zuraina Abdullah
- * Club domestic league appearances and goals

Haji Feisal bin Haji Mohammad Eusoff Patail (born 1967) is a Bruneian former footballer who played as a midfielder. After playing for several years in the Malaysian M-League for the Brunei representative team, he was appointed team manager for the Brunei national under-21 football team that won the 2012 Hassanal Bolkiah Trophy at home soil. He was serving as the president of the Football Association of Brunei Darussalam from 2024 until his dismissal on 23 November 2024 by order of His Majesty Sultan Haji Hassanal Bolkiah.

Due to the uncommon spelling of his name, it was often miswritten as Faisal Yusof in various publications in the past.

== Playing career ==
Feisal began representing Brunei in the Malaysian leagues in 1985, after BAFA instigated an overhaul of the aging players that came in second to last place and mustered only one victory out of 15 matches in the 1984 season. Players like Feisal, Yunos Yusof, Rosanan Samak, Majidi Ghani and Zainuddin Kassim were drafted into the team with Brazilian coach Oscar Amaro tasked to make the players gel.

Fresh after an impressive showing at the 1985 Brunei Merdeka Games a month prior, Feisal made his international debut on 6 April 1985 in a 5–1 defeat against Hong Kong at Hassanal Bolkiah National Stadium for qualification to the 1986 World Cup.

Feisal played for Brunei until 1993, the latter years playing in the Liga Semi-Pro Divisyen 2 where the Wasps had played since the league's formation in 1989.

== Managerial career ==
In early 2012, Feisal was appointed the team manager of the Brunei U21 squad competing at the upcoming 2012 Hassanal Bolkiah Trophy. Coached by South Korean national Kwon Oh-son, the team clinched the trophy in the final against Indonesia on 9 March, bringing the nation its first footballing trophy since the 1999 Malaysia Cup and a year after a lengthy FIFA ban had decimated Brunei's footballing scene. The same backroom staff were handed the national team job for the 2012 AFF Suzuki Cup qualification matches held in Myanmar the following October, where they narrowly missed out on the tournament proper.

A year later, Feisal was assigned in a similar capacity to the Brunei under-23s competing at the 27th SEA Games in Thailand in December 2013. Underpreparedness and injuries to key players meant the Young Wasps lost all of their matches in the tournament, bringing ire to Prince Sufri Bolkiah, the president of NFABD at the time.

Feisal then managed the Under-21s for the defense of the Hassanal Bolkiah Trophy held in August 2014. Despite bringing the spine of the 2012 winning team in Najib Tarif, Hendra Azam and Adi Said, the team were knocked out in the group stages on goal difference despite a 2–1 victory over Malaysia in the last group game. Feisal tended his resignation immediately after the match.

== Presidency ==
On 1 December 2023, Feisal was nominated as one of four candidates for the Football Association of Brunei Darussalam presidency for the 2024–27 term, to be decided at the FABD Congress on 16 December. He was subsequently elected as president in a majority vote on that date.

On 23 November 2024, he was immediately dismissed as President of the Football Association of Brunei Darussalam. Following this, legal action was taken against him for challenging the authority of His Majesty the Sultan and Yang Di-Pertuan of Brunei Darussalam.

== Honours ==
=== Player ===
Brunei

- Borneo Cup : 1987

=== Manager ===
Brunei U21

- Hassanal Bolkiah Trophy: 2012

=== Individual ===
- Meritorious Service Medal (PJK; 2012)

Sporting positions
Preceded by Pengiran Matusin	President of the Football Association of Brunei Darussalam; 2023–2024	Succeeded by Siti Zuraina Abdullah
