= Football in Brunei =

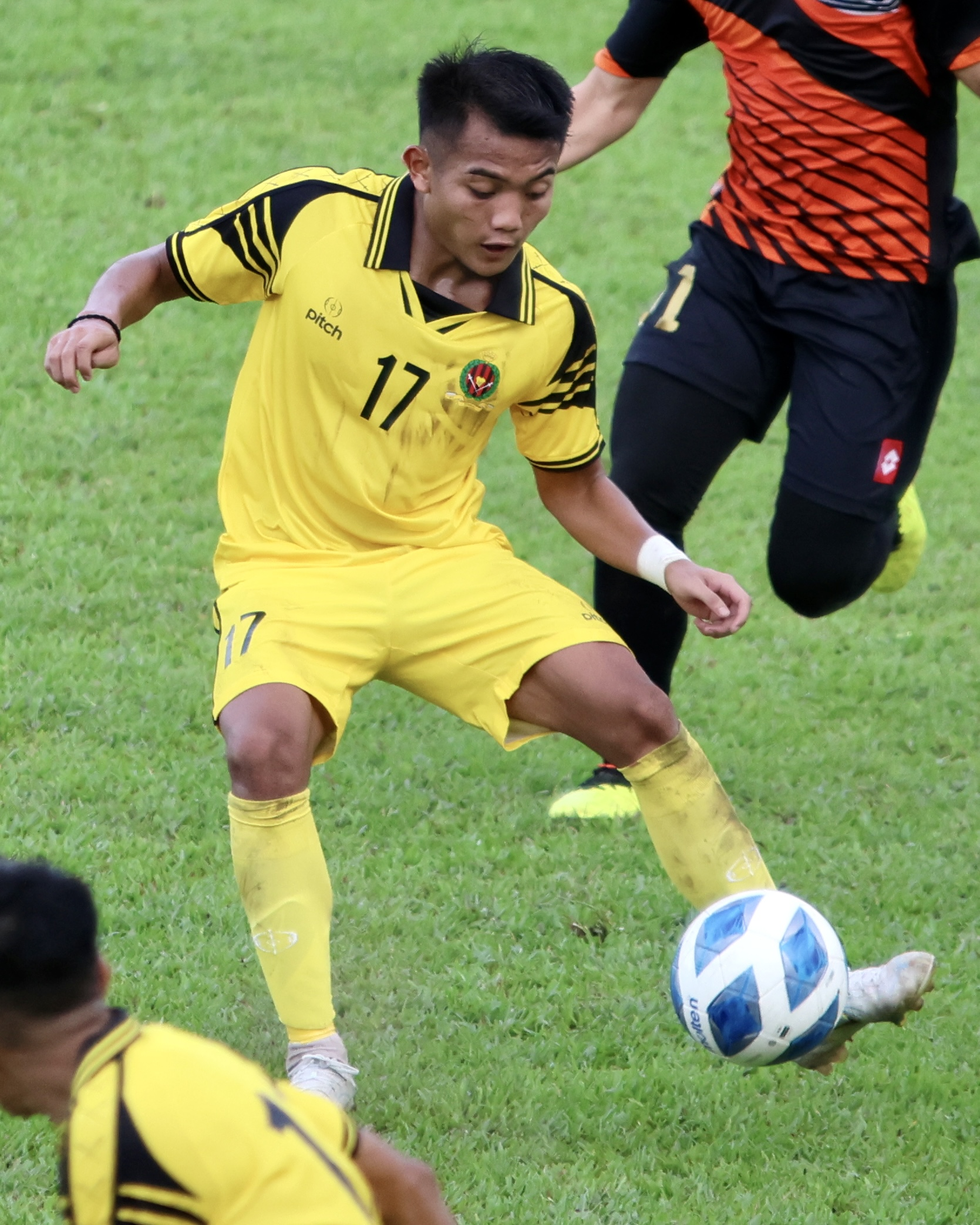
- DPMM FC player during the semi-finals of the FA Cup
- Country: Brunei
- Governing body: FABD
- National teams: men's national team; futsal team
- First played: 22 May 1971

National competitions
- Brunei FA Cup

Club competitions
- Brunei Super League; Brunei Premier League (formerly); Brunei Chinese League; Lela Cheteria League; Brunei District leagues; Brunei Futsal League

International competitions
- FIFA World Cup; FIFA Futsal World Cup; AFC Challenge League; AFC Asian Cup; AFC Futsal Asian Cup; AFC Futsal Club Championship; AFF Championship; ASEAN Club Championship; AFF Futsal Championship; AFF Futsal Club Championship

The sport of football in the country of Brunei is run by the Football Association of Brunei Darussalam (FABD). It is the most popular sport in the country.

== History ==
=== FIFA Goal Project ===
In 2005, the association had their first goal project approved: the construction of the association headquarters in Bandar Seri Begawan. The total cost was approximately US$1.5 million. A second goal project was approved in 2013, which was the installation of an artificial turf pitch and a natural pitch at the headquarters. The total cost was about US$185,000.

=== FIFA Forward project ===
In 2020, the football association applied to FIFA for the construction of a technical centre and mini grandstand, which was approved in April 2021.

== League system ==
Football clubs must adhere to the AFC's Club Development Licensing System in order to participate in the Brunei Super League, as well as cup competitions.

== National teams ==
The Brunei national football team represents Brunei in international football. Other youth teams representing Brunei in other competitions include Brunei national under-23 football team, also known as the Brunei Olympic team, the Brunei national under-21 football team, the Brunei national under-19 football team, and the Brunei national under-17 football team. The Brunei national futsal team represents men's international futsal.

== Stadiums ==
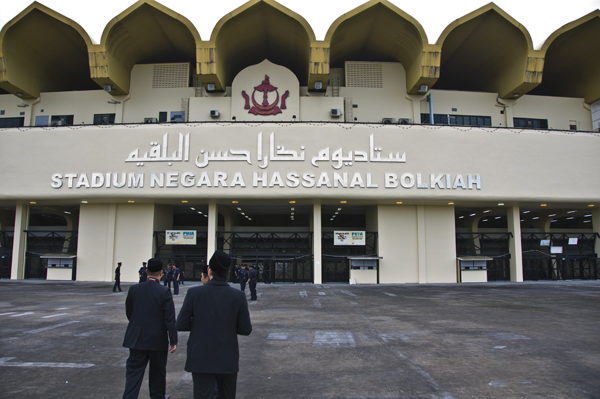
Hassanal Bolkiah National Stadium

Some of the major stadiums used for various Brunei league teams are as follows:

Stadium	Capacity	City	Tenants	Image
Hassanal Bolkiah National Stadium	28,000	Bandar Seri Begawan	Brunei national football team, DPMM FC	

Other venues:

- Track & Field Sports Complex
- Berakas Sports Complex
- Tutong Sports Complex
- Batu Apoi Sports Complex
- FABD Artificial Field
- Hassanal Bolkiah Mini Stadium
- Jerudong Park Mini Stadium
- Arena Sports Complex
- BSRC Football Field

== See also ==
- Lists of stadiums
