= Ratano Tuah =

Bruneian footballer

Personal information
- Full name: Ratano bin Haji Tuah
- Date of birth: 9 February 1976 (age 50)
- Place of birth: Brunei
- Position: Midfielder

Senior career*
Years	Team	Apps	(Gls)
2004	Wijaya		
2004–2005	Brunei		
2005–2013	QAF		
2014–2015	Najip		
2016	IKLS		

International career^{‡}
2006–2008	Brunei	10	(0)
- * Club domestic league appearances and goals as of 1 August 2017 ‡ National team caps and goals as of 18 March 2016

Ratano bin Haji Tuah (born 9 Feb 1976) is a Bruneian former footballer who played as a midfielder.

== Club career ==
Ratano was only a youngster at Wijaya FC when he was chosen to play for what was to become Brunei's final season in the Malaysia Premier League in 2004–05. (Its spot was replaced by Brunei DPMM FC from the 2005–06 season onwards.) After the Brunei team disbanded, he was free to pick his domestic league team in which he chose QAF FC. He stayed there for 8 years, winning the Brunei Premier League for three consecutive times. He signed for Najip FC in 2014 and became the captain of renamed Najip I-Team the following season. He signed for IKLS FC in the 2016 season.

== International career ==
Ratano gained 10 caps with the Brunei national football team on three occasions, namely the 2006 AFC Challenge Cup in Bangladesh, the 2007 AFF Championship qualification in the Philippines and the 2010 AFC Challenge Cup qualification held in Sri Lanka. All of the abovementioned tournaments occurred while QAF FC had represented the national team.

== Honours ==
QAF FC

- Brunei Premier League (3): 2005–06, 2007–08, 2009–10
- Brunei League Cup (2): 2008, 2009
