= Fadlin Galawat =

Bruneian footballer

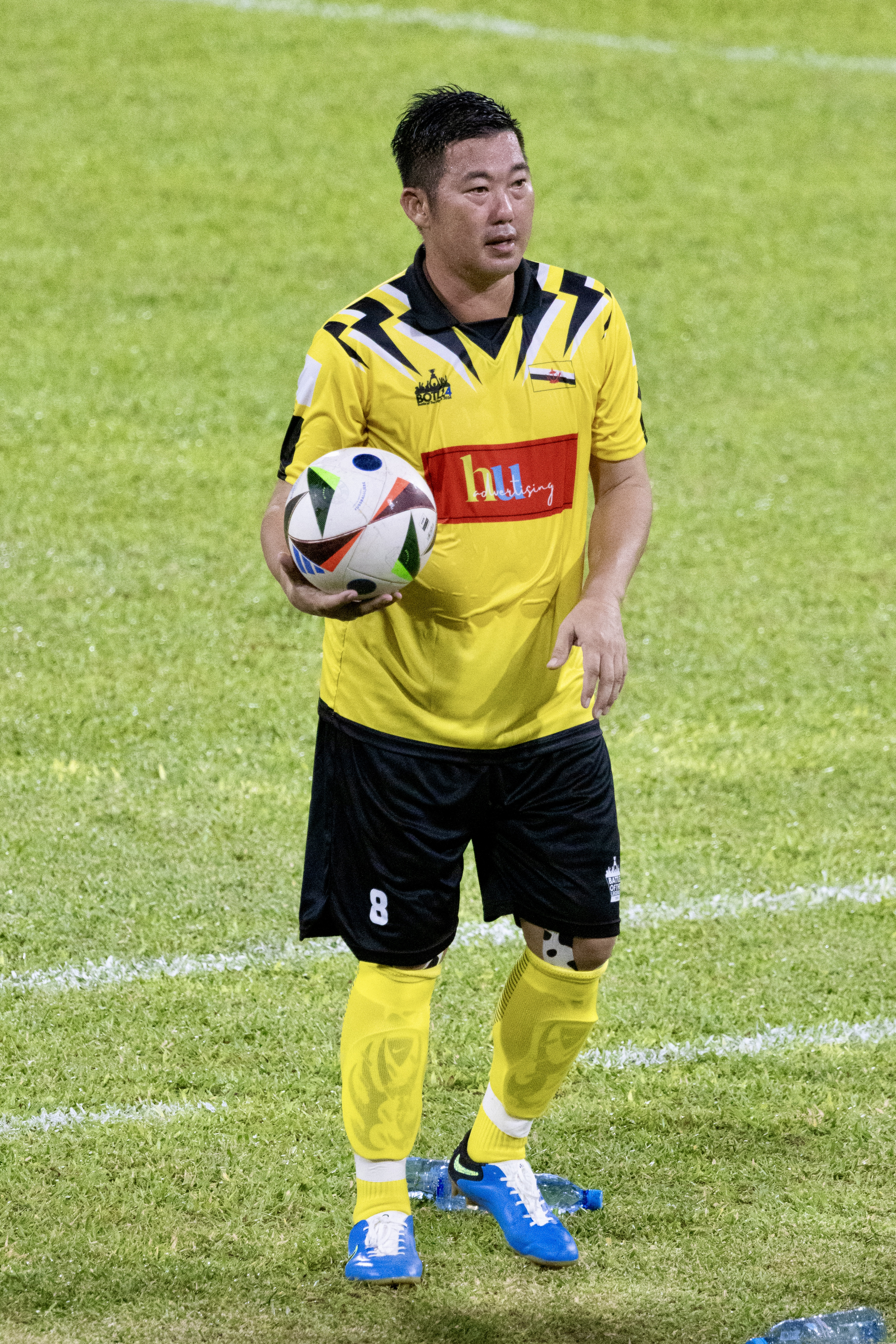
- Fadlin in 2024

Personal information
- Full name: Fadlin bin Galawat
- Date of birth: 5 November 1978 (age 47)
- Place of birth: Temburong, Brunei
- Positions: Midfielder; striker

Senior career*
| Years | Team | Apps | (Gls) |
| 1996–2005 | Brunei | | (24+) |
| 2002–2005 | AH United | | |
| 2005–2008 | DPMM | | (5) |

International career^{‡}
| 1996–2003 | Brunei | 7+ | (1+) |
- * Club domestic league appearances and goals as of 18 September 2019 ‡ National team caps and goals as of 23 January 2017

Fadlin bin Galawat (born 5 November 1978) is a former Bruneian footballer who played for the Bruneian representative team of the M-League, Brunei DPMM FC and the national team as a midfielder. Perhaps the most well-known Bruneian of Murut descent in his heyday, he was a member of the Brunei team that won the Malaysian Cup in 1999.

== Club career ==
=== Brunei ===
Fadlin started out with the Brunei team that played in the Malaysian leagues in 1997. Along with contemporaries Azmanuddin Gillen and Irwan Mohammad, the trio formed a youthful Brunei midfield which complimented the ageing local players and experienced imports. The team finished third in the 1998 Malaysia Premier League 1, their record highest position.

After a lacklustre league campaign the following year, Brunei managed to top their group in the six-team group stage of the season-ending Malaysia Cup. Fadlin scored Brunei's first goal against Negri Sembilan in a 3–0 win at home in the first semifinal. After his team went through in a 4–3 aggregate win, Fadlin started the 1999 Malaysia Cup final held at Stadium Merdeka in Kuala Lumpur, against Sarawak in an all-Borneo matchup. He lifted the cup at the end of the game after two goals from Rosli Liman sealed a famous victory for Brunei.

Brunei were immediately relegated the next year after the restriction of fielding import players by FAM and also the retirement of seven first-team players. Fadlin stayed with the Wasps in the Malaysian second tier for the next five seasons.

=== DPMM FC ===
At club level, Fadlin played for Prince Abdul Hakeem's club, AH United. Fadlin became top-scorer of the inaugural Proton B-League despite his team finishing in fourth place.

Fadlin transferred to Brunei DPMM FC for their 2005 ASEAN Club Championship campaign in July. Playing in the Malaysia Premier League by the end of the year, DPMM finished third and was promoted to the Malaysia Super League through the playoffs. Now playing as a striker, Fadlin served as an experienced backup to Shahrazen Said whose goals propelled DPMM to a respectable third place in the 2006–07 Malaysia Super League.

By 2008, Fadlin was struggling to gain playing time due to a recurring knee injury. He was released in the 2008 close season.

== International career ==
Fadlin played two games at the 1999 SEA Games held in his country Brunei, against Singapore and Indonesia. He appeared three times for the Wasps in the 2000 AFC Asian Cup qualification, which included a 9–0 drubbing by Japan. He scored a goal against Maldives in the 2004 AFC Asian Cup qualification on 21 March 2003.

== Honours ==
=== Club ===
Brunei M-League Team

- Malaysia Cup: 1999

=== Individual ===
- Meritorious Service Medal (PJK; 13 December 1999)
- 2002 Proton B-League top scorer: 18 goals
