= Rosmin Kamis =

Bruneian footballer

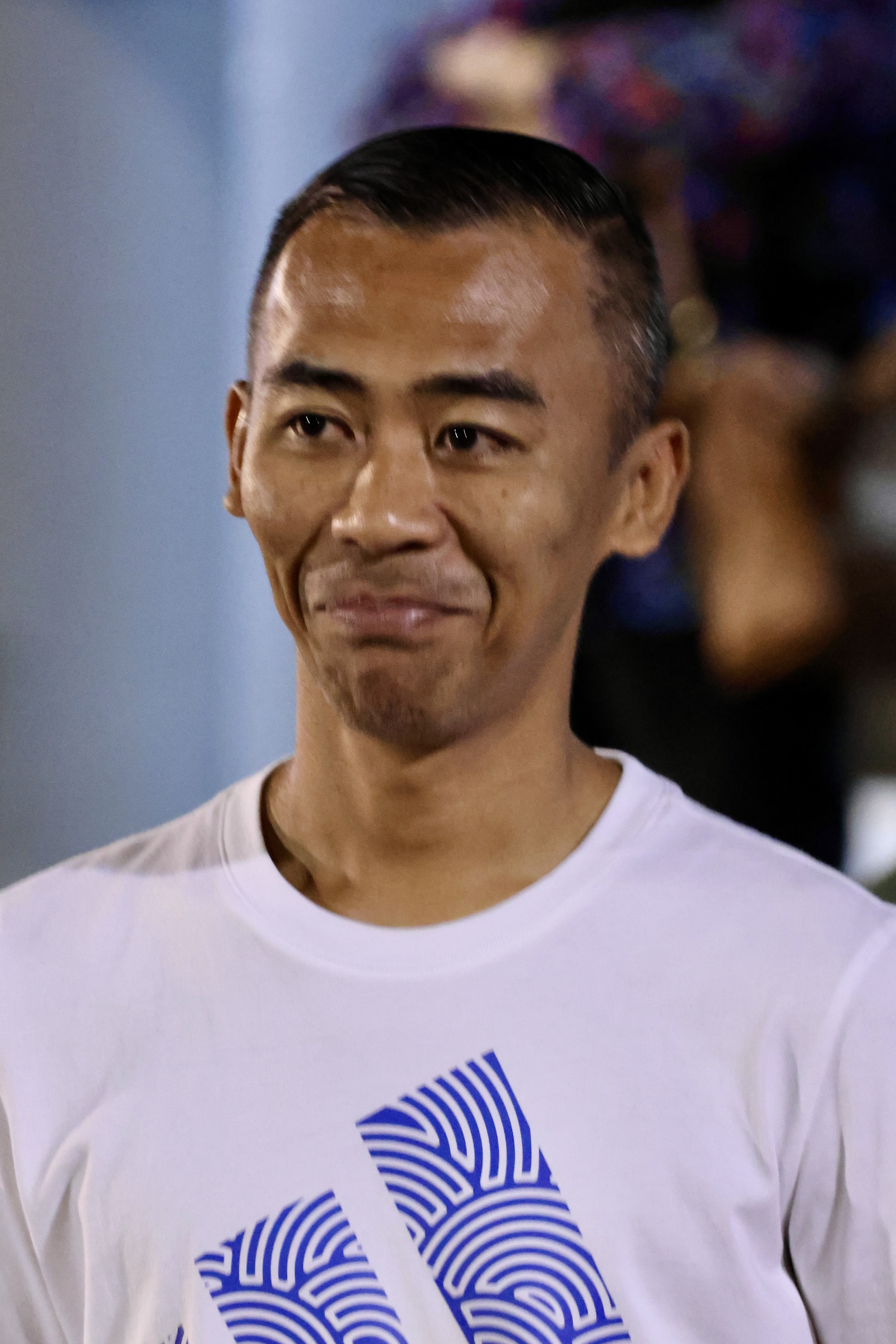
- Rosmin as DPMM II fitness coach in 2024

Personal information
- Full name: Rosmin bin Haji Mohammad Kamis
- Date of birth: 17 June 1981 (age 45)
- Place of birth: Tutong, Brunei
- Height: 1.72 m (5 ft 8 in)
- Position: Midfielder

Senior career*
Years	Team	Apps	(Gls)
2000–2005	Brunei		(8)
2001	AH United		
2002–2004	Armed Forces		
2004–2009	DPMM		(20)
2009–2011	MS ABDB		
2012–2017	DPMM	137	(6)
2018	MS ABDB	1	(0)

International career^{‡}
2001	Brunei U23	2	(0)
2003–2016	Brunei	14	(1)

Managerial career
- 2018–2020: MS ABDB
- * Club domestic league appearances and goals as of 19 March 2021 ‡ National team caps and goals as of 23 January 2017

Lance Corporal (U) Rosmin bin Haji Muhammad Kamis (born 17 June 1981) is a Bruneian former footballer and current assistant team manager at DPMM FC. He was a midfielder for the Bruneian M-League representative team and most famously DPMM FC as captain of the 2015 S.League championship winners.

== Club career ==
Rosmin began his career in 2000 with the Brunei team that was playing in the Malaysian league system. He played for Brunei FA until 2005.

At club level, Rosmin first turned out for AH United, then when the B-League was first established in 2002 he played for the football team of his day-job employers the Royal Brunei Armed Forces, which would later on be called MS ABDB. He won the Brunei FA Cup in 2003, beating Kota Ranger FC with 3 goals unanswered. Despite denying them the B-League title the previous season, DPMM FC signed him in 2004 as part of the royally-owned club's spending spree and his team would eventually steamroll the league to win the championship unbeaten.

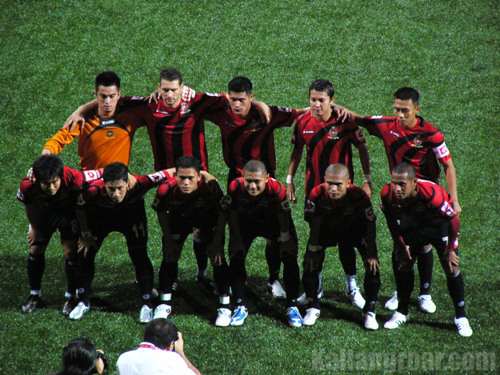
Rosmin-captained DPMM during the 2009 Singapore League Cup Final.

Rosmin would also play an eventful FA Cup final against his former teammates the Armed Forces, when after 90 minutes of goalless action that sent the game to extra time, he had to go between the sticks after DPMM FC goalkeeper Wardun Yussof was sent off with three substitutes already used. In the ensuing penalty shootout, he saved two spot-kicks to complete a domestic double for Prince Al-Muhtadee Billah's club. He subsequently won the 2004 B-League Player of the Year in his first season with DPMM.

In December 2005, DPMM replaced Brunei FA for the 2005–06 Malaysia Premier League season. Now serving as captain, Rosmin led the team to finish third in the 'A' group of the regular league, but due to the expansion of the Malaysia Super League to 14 teams from eight, DPMM entered the promotion and relegation playoffs against Pahang and won the tie 2–1 on aggregate. The next season saw them miraculously finish in third place, thanks to prolific striker Shah Razen Said who became joint top-scorer in the league.

When DPMM moved to the Singaporean league in 2009, Rosmin lifted the League Cup as captain after slotting home the winning penalty in the final. He was released after the season ended abruptly due to a FIFA suspension of Brunei, and promptly joined MS ABDB where he won the domestic FA Cup in 2010. That season, he ended QAF FC's 34-game unbeaten streak by scoring two goals in the final game of the 2009-10 Brunei Premier League, although QAF FC were already champions by then.

Rosmin returned to DPMM as club captain in 2012 after their re-entry into the S.League. Since then they have repeated their League Cup success in 2012 and 2014. On 21 November 2015, Rosmin lifted the S.League championship trophy for the first time in DPMM FC history, after a 4–0 win over Balestier Khalsa clinched the title for the Bruneian outfit. After two spells and 11 years of service, DPMM made an announcement on their website on 6 February 2018 that Rosmin will not be retained for the 2018 S.League season. He played one last game with his previous team MS ABDB in the final game of the 2018 Brunei Premier League against Indera SC, which by then the Armymen were already crowned champions of the league.

== International career ==
Rosmin made his international debut for Brunei at the 2004 AFC Asian Cup qualification which was held in Maldives. He played the full 90 minutes in a 1–1 draw against the home team on 21 March 2003. He also played against Myanmar two days later in a 5–0 loss.

Rosmin's next international appearance was at the 2012 AFF Suzuki Cup qualification held in Myanmar, where he captained the side to two wins out of four. He also led the team in the 2014 tournament in Laos, where Brunei lost all their games.

Rosmin was made captain of Brunei for the 2016 AFF Suzuki Cup qualification matches that was played in Cambodia in October 2016. He did not start the first game against Timor-Leste as Mike Wong opted for Nur Ikhmal Damit and Shahrazen Said in the central midfield roles, and only came on at right-back to replace Fakharrazi Hassan later in the game which finished 2–1 in favour of the Wasps. He did not retain the captain's armband from Faiq Bolkiah despite starting the game at left-back against hosts Cambodia in a 0–3 loss. Rosmin was finally played in central midfield in the final game against Laos where Brunei fell again to a 4–3 scoreline.

It is reported that the 2016 AFC Solidarity Cup held in nearby Kuching, Malaysia would be Rosmin's last competition as an international footballer. He started the first game as captain in an emergency centre-back role and led the team to a 4–0 victory over Timor-Leste, Brunei's biggest ever win to date. He reprised the role in the semi-final against Macau, but after playing for over an hour at 1–1 with only 10 men, he missed his spot-kick in the ensuing penalty shootout, which Brunei would eventually lose 4–3. He played his final match for the Wasps in a 3–2 loss at the hands of Laos in the third-place play-off on 14 November.

== International goals ==
Goal	Date	Venue	Opponent	Score	Result	Competition
1.	11 October 2012	Yangon, Myanmar	Laos	1–0	1–3	2012 AFF Suzuki Cup qualification

== Honours ==
=== Team ===
DPMM FC

- Brunei FA Cup: 2004
- S.League: 2015
- Singapore League Cup (3): 2009, 2012, 2014

MS ABDB

- Brunei FA Cup (2): 2003, 2010

=== Coach ===
MS ABDB

- Brunei Super League: 2018–19

=== Individual ===
- 2004 Brunei Premier League Player of the Year
- IFFHS Brunei All Time Dream Team: 2021

== Personal life ==
Rosmin is affectionately called "Bobby" by his teammates and fans. His brother Rosaidi Kamis is also a former footballer who was with the Brunei team that won the 1999 Malaysia Cup. His sister Rosita is a lawn bowler who has won medals for Brunei.
