= Brunei Football Association =

Former national football association of Brunei

AFC
- Founded: 1952; 74 years ago
- Folded: 2008; 18 years ago
- Headquarters: Bandar Seri Begawan
- FIFA affiliation: 1972; 54 years ago
- AFC affiliation: 1969; 57 years ago
- AFF affiliation: 1984; 42 years ago
- President: Hussain Yussoff
- Vice-President: Hassan Abas

The Brunei Football Association (Malay: Persatuan Bolasepak Brunei; abbrev: BAFA) was the governing body of football in Brunei until 2008.

== History ==
=== Early days ===
The Brunei State Amateur Football Association was formed in 1952 in Seria, Brunei. It was formally registered to the Registrar of Soceities in 1956, and afterwards joined FIFA in 1972 as the Brunei Amateur Football Association or simply BAFA, which it was still referred to as until its final days even after the dropping of 'Amateur' from its name in 1993. The association was responsible for Brunei's participation in the annual Borneo Cup, and from 1979 to 2005, the Brunei representative team in the Malaysian leagues.

A National Football Development Program named Projek Ikan Pusu (PIP) was established in 2001, jointly by BAFA and Jabatan Pendidikan Kokurikulum (JPKK).

=== 2009 FIFA ban ===
In September 2009 the association was banned globally by FIFA due to government interference in the association. On 30 May 2011 the ban by FIFA was lifted. The association was succeeded by the National Football Association of Brunei Darussalam.

== Association members ==
Name	Position	Notes
Pehin Hussain Yusof	President	
Pengiran Hussain Abas	Vice-President	
Pengiran Matusin Matasan	General Secretary	
Jeffery Pang	Treasurer	
Vjeran Simunic	Men's Coach	
Pengiran Aliuddin Tajuddin	Referee Coordinator	

== See also ==
- Brunei (Liga Premier team)
- Football Federation of Brunei Darussalam, the association that governed Brunei football in 2009–2011
