= Amir Alagić =

Bosnian professional football manager (born 1960)

Personal information
- Date of birth: 5 March 1960 (age 66)
- Place of birth: Bihać, FPR Yugoslavia

Senior career*
Years	Team	Apps	(Gls)
1970–1982	Jedinstvo Bihać		
1982–1985	Borac Banja Luka		
1986–1990	Jedinstvo Bihać		
1994–1995	SC 04 Leer		
1995–1996	Dandenong Thunder		

Managerial career
- 1996–1998: Dandenong Thunder
- 1999: Bratstvo Cijevna
- 2000–2001: Bosnia and Herzegovina U19
- 2001–2003: Nike Academy
- 2004–2005: DPMM
- 2005: Brunei
- 2006–2007: Osnabrück (assistant)
- 2007: Werder Bremen (assistant)
- 2007–2008: Al-Nasr Academy
- 2008–2009: Sohar
- 2009–2010: Jedinstvo Bihać
- 2009–2010: Libya U23
- 2012–2013: East Bengal
- 2013: Gostivari
- 2013–2014: Sohar
- 2014: Al-Riyadh
- 2015: New Radiant
- 2016: Carlstad United
- 2016: Drita
- 2016–2017: South China (youth coach)
- 2017–2018: Gol Gohar (youth coach)
- 2018–2019: Jedinstvo Bihać (sporting director)
- 2020–2022: Sri Lanka
- 2025: Fassell
- * Club domestic league appearances and goals

Amir Alagić (born 5 March 1960) is a Bosnian-Australian professional football manager.

== Managerial career ==
Alagić started his coaching career in 1996 in Australia, where he migrated, and then managed clubs in Europe and Asia. He also managed Bosnia and Herzegovina U19. In 2004, he was appointed head coach of Bruneian club DPMM FC and won the domestic double there, instigating a stint with the country's national football team a year later. In 2020, he was appointed as the manager of Sri Lanka national team. He resigned as coach of Sri Lanka after the 2023 AFC Asian Cup qualification, as Sri Lanka, rated as the weakest team in the group, were eliminated without scoring a point and only two goals.

In July 2025, he was appointed head coach of reigning champions FC Fassell of the LFA First Division in Liberia. He was relieved of his post in November.
