= 2003 Brunei Premier League =

Brunei Premier League
- Season: 2003

Statistics of the Brunei Premier League for the 2003 season.

== Overview ==
It was contested by 20 teams, and Wijaya FC won the championship.

On 5 October, Wijaya beat Indera in their final match of the season courtesy of a solitary Norsillmy Taha goal. DPMM FC would win the championship if they produced the same result against ABDB the following day, as they had a superior goal difference to Wijaya's in their identical league win–loss record.

On 6 October, ABDB beat DPMM 3-1 through a penalty by future DPMM captain Rosmin Kamis followed by goals scored by Sardillah Abdullah and Samdani Judin to hand the title to Wijaya.

== First stage ==
=== Group A ===
Pos	Team	Pld	W	D	L	GF	GA	GD	Pts
1	AH United	9	7	2	0	22	9	+13	23
2	DPMM FC	9	7	1	1	35	6	+29	22
3	Jerudong FC	9	5	2	2	14	13	+1	17
4	Sengkurong FC	9	5	1	3	17	11	+6	16
5	Kota Ranger FC	9	4	2	3	25	13	+12	14
6	Sabina FC	9	4	2	3	25	15	+10	14
7	Bandaran KB	8	2	2	4	11	16	−5	8
8	Mulaut FC	9	1	3	5	11	20	−9	6
9	Lun Bawang	8	1	1	6	6	26	−20	4
10	IBM Bokok	9	0	0	9	3	40	−37	0

Source: rsssf.com

=== Group B ===
Pos	Team	Pld	W	D	L	GF	GA	GD	Pts
1	Kasuka FC	9	8	0	1	28	8	+20	24
2	Wijaya FC	9	7	1	1	21	7	+14	22
3	Brunei Armed Forces	9	7	0	2	23	7	+16	21
4	Indera FC	9	5	1	3	22	14	+8	16
5	QAF FC	9	5	1	3	21	15	+6	16
6	Kilanas FC	9	3	1	5	14	26	−12	10
7	Persatuan AKSE	9	2	0	7	18	26	−8	6
8	Kamudi FC	9	2	0	7	9	20	−11	6
9	Pesaka FC	9	1	2	6	13	20	−7	5
10	Mengelella FC	9	1	2	6	9	35	−26	5

Source: rsssf.com

== Second stage ==
Pos	Team	Pld	W	D	L	GF	GA	GD	Pts
1	Wijaya FC	9	8	1	0	16	3	+13	25
2	DPMM FC	9	7	1	1	30	6	+24	22
3	Brunei Armed Forces	9	7	0	2	29	9	+20	21
4	Kasuka FC	9	5	1	3	20	17	+3	16
5	AH United	9	4	0	5	20	18	+2	12
6	Indera FC	9	3	2	4	17	21	−4	11
7	Sengkurong FC	9	2	2	5	10	21	−11	8
8	Kota Ranger FC	9	2	1	6	12	24	−12	7
9	QAF FC	9	1	1	7	12	22	−10	4
10	Jerudong FC	9	1	1	7	10	35	−25	4

Source: rsssf.com
