= Wijaya FC =

Bruneian football club

Wijaya
- Full name: Wijaya Football Club
- Nickname: WFC
- Founded: 1989; 37 years ago
- Ground: Various
- Chairman: Hassan Yussof
- Head coach: Erni Abdul Hakim
- League: Brunei Super League
- 2025–26: 10th
Home colours	Away colours

Wijaya Football Club (Malay: Kelab Bola Sepak Wijaya; abbrev: WFC) is a professional football club from Brunei that competes in the Brunei Super League. They are a founding member of both the B-League in 2002, as well as the Super League in 2012. They were also the inaugural winners of the Brunei FA Cup in 2002.

== History ==
=== Early years ===
In 1975, the club began as a bunch of under-14s competing at the Ong Sum Ping Field under the name Pekerma FC. The senior side Youngster FC, the club that served as an example and source of encouragement for the teenagers as they grew up, occupied the space the majority of the time. They would work out together, and five years after Youngster FC ceased to exist, Pekerma finally changed their name to the OSP Rangers as they took part in competitions.

=== Local successes ===
Wijaya FC didn't get started until they registered for the Brunei-Muara District League in 1989. They made an impression in their first season, finishing second in Division II, which led to their promotion to the top division, where they competed from 1990 until 2001. They entered the B-League in 2002 as one of the top teams in the country and nurtured players that would become Bruneian household names like Wardun Yussof, Ratano Tuah and Norsillmy Taha. In the 2002 Brunei FA Cup final, Wijaya defeated MS ABDB 1–0 to claim their first trophy. Indeed, it was the latter who scored the winning goal in the final. The next year, they won the Super Cup by the same margin against the same opponents.

After going undefeated in the second round, Wijaya added another trophy to his collection by winning the 2003 Brunei Premier League championship. In their final game, they defeated Indera SC 1–0 thanks to a goal from Norsillmy Taha, finishing two points ahead of DPMM FC. Twenty teams in all, divided into two groups, competed in the event, with Wijaya finishing second in Group B. In the second round, the top 10 teams went on. As the final fixtures were not played at the same time, Wijaya needed to rely on the result between DPMM FC and MS ABDB to keep their lead at the table, and it was the Armymen who performed a huge upset by beating the royally-owned club and hand Wijaya the title.

=== Present day ===
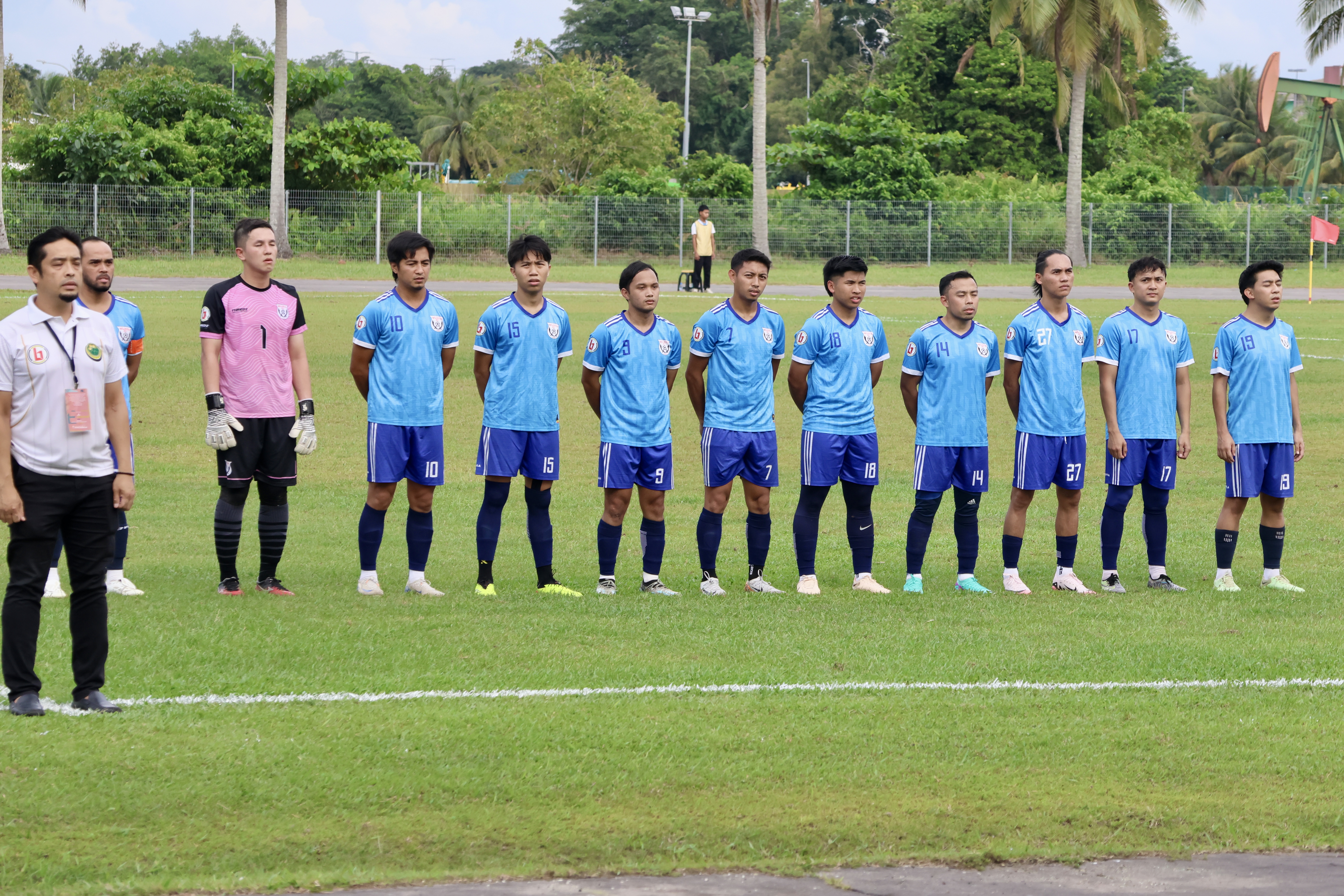
Wijaya starting line-up during the 2024–25 Brunei Super League match against Kuala Belait FC

For the 2007–2008 season, they reached the FA Cup final once more, but this time, the armymen came out on top 1–0. In 2016, Wijaya competed in the Super League again and finished in third place. In their most recent performance during the 2018–19 season, they finished third once more after collecting 37 points from 18 games. The club was in 6th place in the 2020 Super League when it was unexpectedly postponed and eventually cancelled due to the COVID-19 pandemic in the country, ending the tournament with only two matches completed. Wijaya came in third in Group C during the group stage of the 2022 FA Cup and failed to qualify for the knockout stage.

== Current squad ==
As of 23 September 2026

Note: Flags indicate national team as defined under FIFA eligibility rules; some limited exceptions apply. Players may hold more than one non-FIFA nationality.

No.	Pos.	Nation	Player
1	GK	BRU	Lim Jin Yee
2	MF	BRU	Zainul Aiman Zakaria
3	DF	BRU	Darwishafis Hamzillah
4	DF	BRU	Syahrul Suhaili
5	DF	BRU	Muhammad Ibrahim
6	MF	BRU	Ya'akub Matyassin
7	MF	BRU	Amirul Mu'adz Kamshulzaman
8	MF	BRU	Anaqi Sufi Omar Baki
9	FW	BRU	Marhazif Ahad
10	MF	BRU	Ali Haikal Ali Redzuan
11	FW	BRU	Bazli Aminuddin
12	DF	BRU	Amirulizam Pungut
13	GK	BRU	Nur Nizam Ismail
14	DF	BRU	Ilyasa Izzuddin Romie Yurienta
15	MF	BRU	Mahmud Khalish Zaifulizham

No.	Pos.	Nation	Player
16	DF	BRU	Irfan Abdullah Ikhwan Chin
17	MF	BRU	Fadzil Ismail Hamdani
18	FW	BRU	Khalid Saab
19	DF	BRU	Faizul Ambotang
21	MF	BRU	Nazri Hassan
22	DF	BRU	Abdul Hakimee Ahmad Hamzah
23	MF	BRU	Jamrin Johari
24	GK	BRU	Akmal Hakeem Shamsuddin
25	GK	BRU	Fathurrasyid Abdul Rahman
26	FW	BRU	Noor Raimy Karim
27	FW	BRU	Raziman Abdul Rahman
28	DF	BRU	Nazirul Azim Redzuan
29	DF	BRU	Hirzi Zulfaqar Mahzan
30	FW	BRU	Aisamuddin Jali

== Honours ==
- Shell Helix B-League: 2003
- Brunei FA Cup: 2002
- Brunei Super Cup: 2003
