= Brunei (Liga Premier team) =

Brunei team in Malaysian competitions

- Full name: Brunei Football Association
- Nickname: Tebuan (The Wasps)
- Founded: 1979; 47 years ago
- Dissolved: 2005; 21 years ago
- Ground: Hassanal Bolkiah National Stadium
- Capacity: 35,000
Home colours	Away colours

The Brunei Football Association used to enter a team in Malaysian football competitions. The team won the Malaysia Cup in 1999. The team played at the 35,000-seat Hassanal Bolkiah National Stadium in Bandar Seri Begawan.

== History ==
Brunei first entered the Malaysian football league competitions in 1979. When the Liga Semi-Pro was introduced in Malaysia in 1989, Brunei also were invited along with Singapore, the other foreign team in Malaysian competition. Historically Brunei were the lower ranked team in Malaysian competition, often finishing at the lower rung of the league table and knocked out in the early stages of Malaysia Cup. However, their highest achievement in Malaysian competition was winning the Malaysia Cup in 1999, the first time they had won the competition. Brunei's final season in the Malaysian competition was in 2005 Liga Premier. Starting from 2006 until 2008, the only professional club in Brunei, DPMM FC replaced them as Brunei's representation in Malaysian competitions.

== Final squad ==
Squad for the 2003 Malaysia Premier League season.

Note: Flags indicate national team as defined under FIFA eligibility rules; some limited exceptions apply. Players may hold more than one non-FIFA nationality.

No.	Pos.	Nation	Player
—	GK	BRU	Alizanda Sitom
—	GK	BRU	Wardun Yussof
—	DF	ROU	Florin Socaciu
—	DF	BRU	Shahruddin Tajuddin
—	DF	BRU	Shahrul Rizal Abdul Rahman
—	DF	BRU	Shaiful Aznee Zaini
—	DF	BRU	Suhaime Yussof
—	DF	BRU	Zulkefly Duraman
—	MF	BRU	Edi Ruslan Abdul Samad
—	MF	BRU	Irwan Mohammad
—	MF	BRU	Ratano Tuah

No.	Pos.	Nation	Player
—	MF	BRU	Rosmin Kamis
—	MF	BRU	Nazlee Sabli
—	MF	BRU	Saizan Kula
—	MF	BRU	Sallehuddin Damit
—	MF	BRU	Shahrin Zaini
—	MF	BRU	Subhi Abdilah Bakir
—	FW	BRU	Fadlin Galawat
—	FW	BIH	Ferid Idrizović
—	FW	BRU	Julremi Zaini
—	FW	NGA	Ajayi Oluseye

== Honours ==
- Malaysia Cup
  - Winners (1): 1999
- Piala Sumbangsih
  - Runners-up (1): 2000

== See also ==
- DPMM FC
- Brunei national football team
