= 2004 Brunei Premier League =

Brunei Premier League
- Season: 2004

Statistics of the Brunei Premier League for the 2004 season.

== Overview ==
It was contested by 10 teams, and DPMM FC won the championship.

== League standings ==
Pos	Team	Pld	W	D	L	GF	GA	GD	Pts
1	DPMM FC	18	17	1	0	81	7	+74	52
2	AH United	18	13	3	2	56	19	+37	42
3	MS ABDB	18	11	4	3	43	22	+21	37
4	Wijaya FC	18	7	4	7	42	31	+11	25
5	QAF FC	18	7	3	8	37	37	0	24
6	Kasuka FC	18	7	2	9	36	47	−11	23
7	Jerudong FC	18	7	1	10	30	51	−21	22
8	Indera FC	18	5	2	11	32	57	−25	17
9	Sengkurong FC	18	4	1	13	18	51	−33	13
10	Kota Rangers FC	18	1	1	16	18	71	−53	4

Source: rsssf.com
