= Football Association of Brunei Darussalam =

National football association of Brunei Darussalam

Coordinates: 04°55′32″N 114°56′43″E

AFC
- Short name: FABD
- Founded: 2011; 15 years ago
- Headquarters: FABD House
- Location: Jalan Pusat Persidangan, Bandar Seri Begawan BB4313, Brunei Darussalam
- FIFA affiliation: 1972; 2011 (current governing body)
- AFC affiliation: 1969; 2011 (current governing body)
- AFF affiliation: 1984; 2011 (current governing body)
- President: Siti Zuraina Abdullah
- Website: The-FABD.com

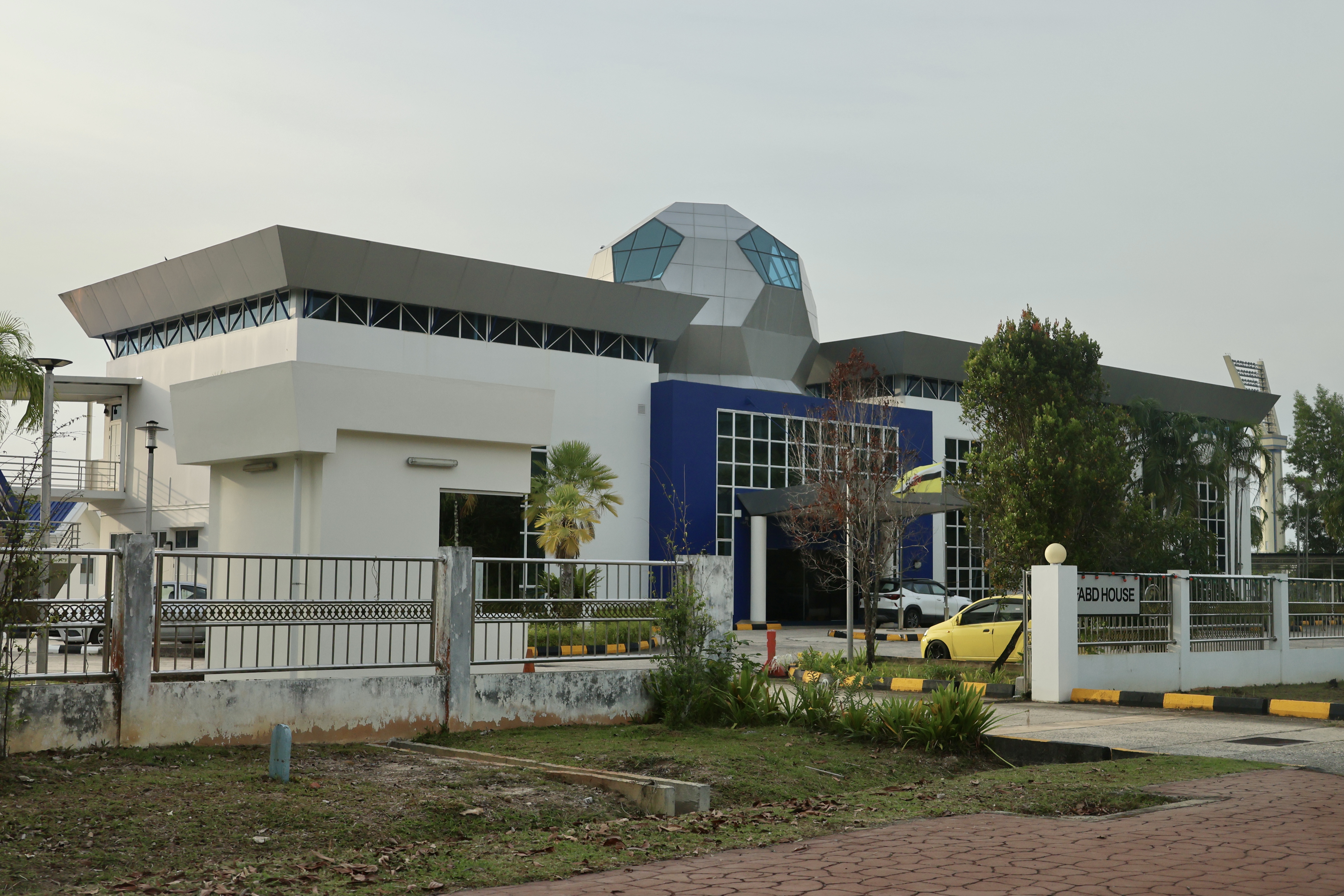
FABD headquarters

The Football Association of Brunei Darussalam (FABD, Malay: Persatuan Bolasepak Brunei Darussalam, Jawi: ڤرساتوان بولاسيڤق بروني دارالسلام) is the governing body of association football in Brunei.

== History ==
The Football Association of Brunei Darussalam (FABD) is the successor organisation of the Brunei Football Association (BAFA) that was banned by the International Association Football Federation (FIFA) and Asian Football Confederation (AFC) in 2009 for government interference. At its meeting on 30 May 2011, the FIFA Executive Committee, presided over by president Joseph S. Blatter, resolved to remove the suspensions against the football associations of Bosnia-Herzegovina (FFBH) and Brunei Darussalam.

In July 2021, it rebranded into its current name, omitting the word 'National'. The association was also previously known as the National Football Association of Brunei Darussalam (NFABD). The decision was made in order to firmly reflect on the association's objective of producing innovative and substantial advancements to increase the sport's viability. Additionally, it will reflect the association's development and progress since its founding in 2011. There was also a new logo introduced.

On 2 March 2016, the AFC has presented the NFABD with the Grassroots Award for Aspiring Member Association at the first AFC Grassroots Conference this week in Kuala Lumpur. As a substitute for the 2020 Brunei Super League, which was canceled on 19 September 2020 after just two matches owing to COVID-19, the 2020 FA Cup scheduled to begin on 1 November 2020 was canceled. Following the recent lessening of lockdown due to the COVID-19 pandemic, the association plans to resume football in the nation on 12 June 2020.

The NFABD plans to build a new Technical Centre and a Mini Grandstand inside of their complex with a budget of US$2.1 million. The first Technical Centre with facilities for football practice and games for the National Football Association of Brunei Darussalam (NFABD) has started construction on 14 June 2021. The B$3.9 million technical centre, which is entirely sponsored by the FIFA Forward Development Programme, is anticipated to give young people greater possibilities to hone their footballing abilities.

=== New entity ===
On 11 July 2021, a decade after it was formed, the Football Association of Brunei Darussalam (FABD) aligned itself with the country's philosophy as part of its rebranding strategy. In fact, FABD, which was earlier established as the National Football Association of Brunei Darussalam (NFABD), dropped the word National from its name. The association's name wasn't the only change. A new logo was also unveiled, which was a combination of a three-layered crescent representing the lunar stages culminating into a full moon. The three layers of the crescent each represent the colours of the national flag of Brunei. The ‘ripe-lemon’ coloured crescent contains a Jawi inscription of the association's name in Malay while the black crescent has the association's name in English written in Roman letters. The logo also features a green football covered with honeycomb pattern, signifying the association's wish to inject more precise and better growth in the sport. In fact, the honeycomb motif was chosen as it drew inspiration from the national team's nickname ‘The Wasps’.

The decisions were taken to reflect the association's vision of delivering fresh and more robust developments, making the sport more sustainable in the country by 2035. It was also aimed to mirror the FABD's growth and expansion in the last decade. As part of its development initiatives, construction has begun for the country's first technical centre with facilities for football training and matches. The USD 2.9 million project is completely funded by the FIFA Forward Development Programme and is expected to provide more opportunities for the youth to improve their footballing skills. The technical centre will be equipped with a mini gymnasium, medical centre, research room and auditorium. A mini grandstand will complement the FIFA-funded artificial field as a competition venue.

Considering the time needed to adapt to the new standards once the country started to open its activities once more, the FABD opted to stop the 2021 Brunei Super League.

=== Tumultuous period ===
After failing to submit a statutory audit to FIFA in 2023, the FABD announced the suspension of the president as well as the termination of the General Secretary on 16 November. The annual congress to elect a new president was held on 16 December 2023. Former national team player Feisal Eusoff was voted as the new president for the 2024–27 term, amongst other appointments.

On 23 November 2024, after a series of transgressions, Feisal was unanimously removed from the presidency by the executive committee, and appointed Mahrub Murni as President ad interim in his place. On 16 December, Mahrub stepped down from his position and was replaced by Kamarunsalehin Kamis.

In October 2025, a normalisation committee was established by football's governing body FIFA to oversee a free and fair election in the near future for FABD. The committee will also serve to stabilise the football association from its history of flawed leadership, and ensure its vision of women's football be implemented.

=== First female president ===
FABD carried out its 15th Congress on 19 June 2026, whereby Siti Zuraina Abdullah was voted as the new President, to serve from 2026 to 2030. She became the first female president of the association. Her immediate task was to secure funding allocated to Brunei from FIFA and AFC that were withheld due to instability from the previous regimes, and that was achieved within the first 100 days of her tenure.

== Youth development programmes ==
The FABD focuses on football development and operates national age group programmes with U-23, U-21, U-19 and U-17 teams (known as Tabuan Muda).

Two additional leagues were added; Brunei Under 18 Youth League and Brunei Under 15 Youth League.

The NFABD detailed its plans to coordinate grassroots football events throughout 2019, through the Technical Development Department's Grassroots Development Unit. Additionally, the association and the Brunei Shell Recreation Club (BSRC) organised the 'NFABD U6/U8 and U10 Grassroots Football Festival 2019 in celebration of AFC Grassroots Football Day' as part of an ongoing initiative to support the development of the youth's football skills and talents.

== List of presidents ==
- Abdul Rahman Mohiddin (2011–2013)
- Sufri Bolkiah (2013–2019)
- Matusin Matasan (2019–2023)
- Feisal Eusoff (2024)
- Siti Zuraina Abdullah (2026–)

== FABD Congress ==
There are 20 congress members in FABD, all of them are affiliated with clubs in the Brunei Super League. The Tutong football association, Kuala Belait clubs, Temburong clubs, MS PPDB, MS ABDB, and the referee association cast the 20 ballots.

Name	Position	Ref
(Brunei) Siti Zuraina Abdullah	President	
(Brunei) Adee Suhardee Muhidin	Deputy President	
(Brunei) Waslimin Momin	Executive Committee member	
(Brunei) Shamsul Rezal Ahmad	Executive Committee member	
(Brunei) Amirul Mustaqim Omar	Executive Committee member	
(Brunei) Supry Ladi	Executive Committee member	
(Brunei) Jalalud-Din Ghazali	Executive Committee member	
(Brunei) Anthony Rasiman Sigar	Executive Committee member	
(Brunei) Ishafie Iszuaddin Assokan	Acting General Secretary	
(Brazil) Fábio Magrão	Technical Director	
(Malaysia) Emmielia Kartiena	Head of Competition	
(Brunei) Nabil Iskandar	Club Licensing Manager	
(Brunei) Nasruddin Ruslan	International Relation Officer	
(Brunei) Yusof Zaki Serudin	Referee Development Officer	

== FABD tournaments ==
All are held in Brunei Darussalam.

- Hassanal Bolkiah Trophy for ASEAN Youth Football
- Brunei FA Cup
- Brunei Super Cup
- Brunei Super League
- Brunei Premier League
- Brunei Under 18 Youth League
- NFABD Under-16 Youth Football League
- Brunei Under 15 Youth League
- NFABD Under-12 Futsal Tournament
- FABD Grassroots Cup

== Brunei M-League / M-Cup team ==
On 16 June 2012, the proposal of having a Bruneian team play in the Malaysian M-League had been rejected by the NFABD. Prior to now, the NFABD had enquired about participating in the M-League and, ideally, having direct entry to the top division, the Malaysia Super League. But according to the Football Association of Malaysia (FAM), in 2013 all new recruits must go through the procedure of beginning in the third-tier FAM League.

In 2025, Bruneian club side DPMM FC re-entered the Malaysia Super League as a guest team, further decreasing the likelihood of the revival of the Bruneian representative side in the Malaysia leagues.

== See also ==
- Football in Brunei
