= Brunei Super Cup =

- Founded: 2002
- Region: Brunei Darussalam
- Teams: 2
- Current champions: Kota Ranger FC (2nd title)
- Most championships: MS ABDB (3 titles each)
- Website: Official website
- 2020 Brunei Super Cup

The Brunei Super Cup is a Brunei football cup competition. It was first held in 2002, but has been played on and off since its inception. It is the curtain raiser to the Brunei football season. This competition is played between the league champion and the cup winner.

== Cup Winners ==
Winners so far are: (Previous season league winners are listed first)

- 2002 : DPMM FC 2–1 Wijaya FC
- 2003 : Wijaya FC 1–0 MS ABDB
- 2004 : DPMM FC 4–3 MS ABDB
- 2007 : QAF FC 2–0 AH United
- 2008 : QAF FC 2–0 MS ABDB

Piala Sumbangsih

- 2014 : Indera SC 1–2 MS ABDB
- 2015 : Indera SC 2–0 MS ABDB
- 2016 : MS ABDB 2–1 Indera SC
- 2017 : MS ABDB 2–1 Indera SC
- 2018 : MS ABDB 1–2 Indera SC
- 2019 : not held
- 2020 : MS ABDB 1–3 Kota Ranger
