= 2002 Brunei Premier League =

Brunei Premier League
- Season: 2002

Statistics of the Brunei Premier League football for the 2002 season.

== Overview ==
It was contested by 16 teams, and DPMM FC won the championship.

== First stage ==
=== Group A ===
Pos	Team	Pld	W	D	L	GF	GA	GD	Pts
1	Wijaya FC	5	4	1	0	14	6	+8	13
2	Kasuka FC	5	4	0	1	20	5	+15	12
3	AH United	5	3	1	1	20	7	+13	10
4	Ikatan Belia Mukim Bukok	7	2	1	4	16	22	−6	7
5	Pesaka	5	2	0	3	6	7	−1	6
6	Mulaut FC	4	1	2	1	3	7	−4	5
7	Police Forces	5	1	0	4	4	13	−9	3
8	Bandaran KB	4	0	1	3	4	20	−16	1

Source: rsssf.com

=== Group B ===
Pos	Team	Pld	W	D	L	GF	GA	GD	Pts
1	DPMM FC	7	7	0	0	29	4	+25	21
2	Brunei Armed Forces FC	6	4	1	1	12	10	+2	13
3	Kota Ranger FC	7	4	1	2	18	13	+5	13
4	Jerudong FC	7	3	2	2	11	8	+3	11
5	Indera FC	6	3	0	3	8	8	0	9
6	Kamudi FC	7	2	1	4	8	12	−4	7
7	Kilanas FC	7	1	0	6	7	18	−11	3
8	Mengellela FC	7	0	1	6	3	23	−20	1

Source: rsssf.com

== Second stage ==
Pos	Team	Pld	W	D	L	GF	GA	GD	Pts
1	DPMM FC	7	6	1	0	26	12	+14	19
2	ABDB	7	5	1	1	22	7	+15	16
3	Wijaya FC	7	4	2	1	16	12	+4	14
4	AH United	7	3	2	2	18	14	+4	11
5	Kasuka FC	7	3	0	4	13	20	−7	9
6	Jerudong FC	7	1	2	4	9	14	−5	5
7	Pesaka	7	1	1	5	10	18	−8	4
8	Kota Ranger FC	7	0	1	6	7	25	−18	1

Source: rsssf.com and pelitabrunei.gov.bn
