= DPMM FC =

Football club in Brunei

DPMM
- Full name: Brunei Duli Pengiran Muda Mahkota Football Club
- Founded: 2000; 26 years ago
- Ground: Hassanal Bolkiah National Stadium
- Capacity: 28,000
- Chairman: Prince Al-Muhtadee Billah
- Head coach: Jamie McAllister
- League: Malaysia Super League
- 2025–26: Malaysia Super League, 10th of 13
- Website: www.dpmmfc.club

Duli Pengiran Muda Mahkota Football Club (English: His Royal Highness the Crown Prince of Brunei Football Club; abbrev: DPMM or Brunei DPMM) is a professional football club based in Bandar Seri Begawan, Brunei Darussalam. The club plays in the Malaysia Super League, the top tier of Malaysian football, after previously entering the Singapore Premier League from 2009 to 2025. DPMM is owned by the Crown Prince of Brunei, Prince Al-Muhtadee Billah.

The club played in the Brunei Premier League in the early 2000s, winning the league title in 2002 and 2004. DPMM then decided to play in Malaysia, and joined the second-tier Malaysian Premier League as a foreign-based team in for the 2005–06 season. They won promotion to the Malaysian Super League (the top tier of Malaysian football) at the end of their first season in Malaysian football, and then finished 3rd and 10th in the following two season in the Malaysia Super League. The club then left the Malaysian league and joined Singapore's S.League for the 2009 season. They won the Singapore League Cup in their first season in Singapore, but were forced to withdraw from the league competition five games before the end of the season after FIFA suspended the Brunei Football Association for government interference in its affairs, thus barring teams from Brunei from taking part in overseas competitions. All the club's league results for 2009 were therefore expunged. At the end of the suspension, they re-entered the S.League and won the league title in 2015 and 2019. They returned to the Malaysia Super League starting from the 2025–26 season.

The club reserve club, DPMM II, serves as the club's feeder team and currently competes in the Brunei Premier League. The team provides a pathway for young and developing players to gain competitive experience and potentially progress to the senior squad.

== History ==
=== Beginnings in Brunei (1994–2004) ===
DPMM started out as a college team in 1994, before being officially established as a professional club in 2000. After being the most successful team in college-level football in Brunei, most of the team's talented players joined DPMM when it became a professional.

The club enjoyed considerable success in Brunei's domestic competitions in the early-2000s, winning the Brunei Premier League in 2002 and 2004, the Brunei FA Cup in 2004, and the Brunei Super Cup in 2002 and 2004.

=== Joining the Malaysian league (2005–2008) ===
In 2005, DPMM stopped playing in Brunei's domestic league and joined the Malaysia Premier League (the second tier of Malaysian football) as a foreign-based team, replacing the Brunei representative team. The club was then promoted to the top tier of Malaysian football, Malaysia Super League via the play-offs after a 2–1 aggregate victory over Pahang. They then remarkably finished in 3rd place in their first season in the top tier (2006–07). In the following season (2007–08), they finished in 10th place. They then had to leave the Malaysia Super League due to the deregistration of the Brunei Football Association by the Registrar of Societies.

Since 2004, DPMM had also competed annually in the Singapore Cup (a knock-out tournament which the Football Association of Singapore invites a number of teams from other countries to take part in alongside Singaporean clubs). The team had participated in every edition of the cup from 2004 to 2019, and 2023 to 2025.

=== Joining the Singapore league, and suspension (2009) ===
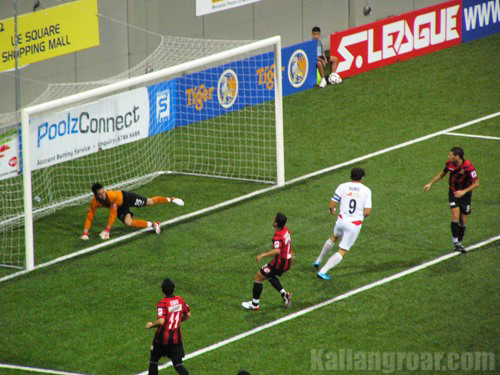
DPMM playing against SAFFC during the 2009 S.League Cup Final

After leaving the Malaysia Super League, DPMM joined Singapore's S.League for the 2009 season, becoming the first team in the league to play their home matches outside Singapore at the Hassanal Bolkiah National Stadium. The club quickly made an impact on the Singapore football scene by winning the Singapore League Cup in June 2009. They defeated the SAFFC in the final on penalties after the match had ended in a 1–1 draw. However, on 30 September that year, FIFA suspended the Brunei Football Association for government interference in its affairs. This meant that teams from Brunei were no longer allowed to compete in tournaments run by other national member associations. The Football Association of Singapore appealed to FIFA to allow DPMM to finish the S.League season, but the appeal was rejected. The results of all DPMM's league matches for 2009 were therefore expunged.

=== Lifting of suspension, success in Singapore (2012–2015) ===
After 20 months of being suspended, FIFA has decided to lift the suspension off Brunei Darussalam. This means that the national team as well as the football teams from Brunei Darussalam are allowed to join any football competitions under FIFA. DPMM re-entered the S.League in the 2012 season, and became dominant after the arrival of former English Premier League manager Steve Kean in 2014. They won their first S.League title in 2015, a year after losing ground in the final fixture of the 2014 season.

=== Intention to pull out from the S.League (2016–2020) ===
Since the 2016 season, the Football Association of Singapore (FAS) has been reducing the number of imports allowed per the S.League team. This has affected the Bruneian-based outfit greatly, with a lesser pool of local players against Singapore's (or Japan's in the case of Albirex Niigata (S)).

Towards the conclusion of the 2017 S.League in November, DPMM announced their intention on their website to possibly move to the Malaysian league, which they last appeared in 2008. This intention was later "dashed" by the FAM and in particular by the Football Malaysia LLP, which stipulated that DPMM have to play their home games in Malaysia and to have a squad full of Malaysians with Bruneians regarded as import players. DPMM called these rulings "unprofessional" and "insane".

In late December, DPMM stated their intentions to join the Indonesian league for the 2018 season instead. This was made after a meeting between S.League clubs whereby new rules were set to restrict foreign imports to two, and the implementation of a youth-focused roster. However, the move would be "technically impossible" to happen according to PSSI's secretary general a few days after the announcement was made.

Further talks with the FAS made at the turn of the year resulted in a compromise that was reached on 10 January 2018, where the S.League competition organisers would allow them to sign up to 3 foreign players instead of 2 with no age restrictions, and DPMM will also not be subject to the age restrictions. Each local S.League team, apart from the Young Lions, will be required to have at least six under-23 players and eight under-30 players in the squad, with the remaining players to be of any age.

Although they participated in the newly revamped Singapore Premier League in 2018, finishing in third place below champions Albirex Niigata (S) and Home United, DPMM considered joining another league in the Southeast Asia region. Reports by Singapore press in October 2018 revealed that DPMM have submitted an official enquiry to join Thai League 1 for the 2019 season. The club would later announced that they would be competing in the 2019 Singapore Premier League, but afterwards expressed an interest to join Indonesia's Liga 1 in 2020.

On 15 September 2019, DPMM were confirmed champions of the 2019 Singapore Premier League after their closest rivals Hougang United only managed to play a 4–4 draw with Geylang International, leaving the Bruneian club with an unassailable four-point lead at the top of the table. They also reached the semi-finals of the 2019 Singapore Cup before being eliminated by via penalty shootout to Warriors on 30 October.

In 2020, DPMM participated in the Singapore Premier League, but could only play one game before the COVID-19 pandemic forced the league to be suspended until October. The team was unable to fulfill the remaining fixtures due to travel restrictions between Brunei and Singapore, resulting in the inevitable exclusion from the year's SPL season.

DPMM once again withdrew from the 2021 Singapore Premier League due to the ongoing travel restrictions imposed by the Brunei government, but not before showing intent to participate in the league.

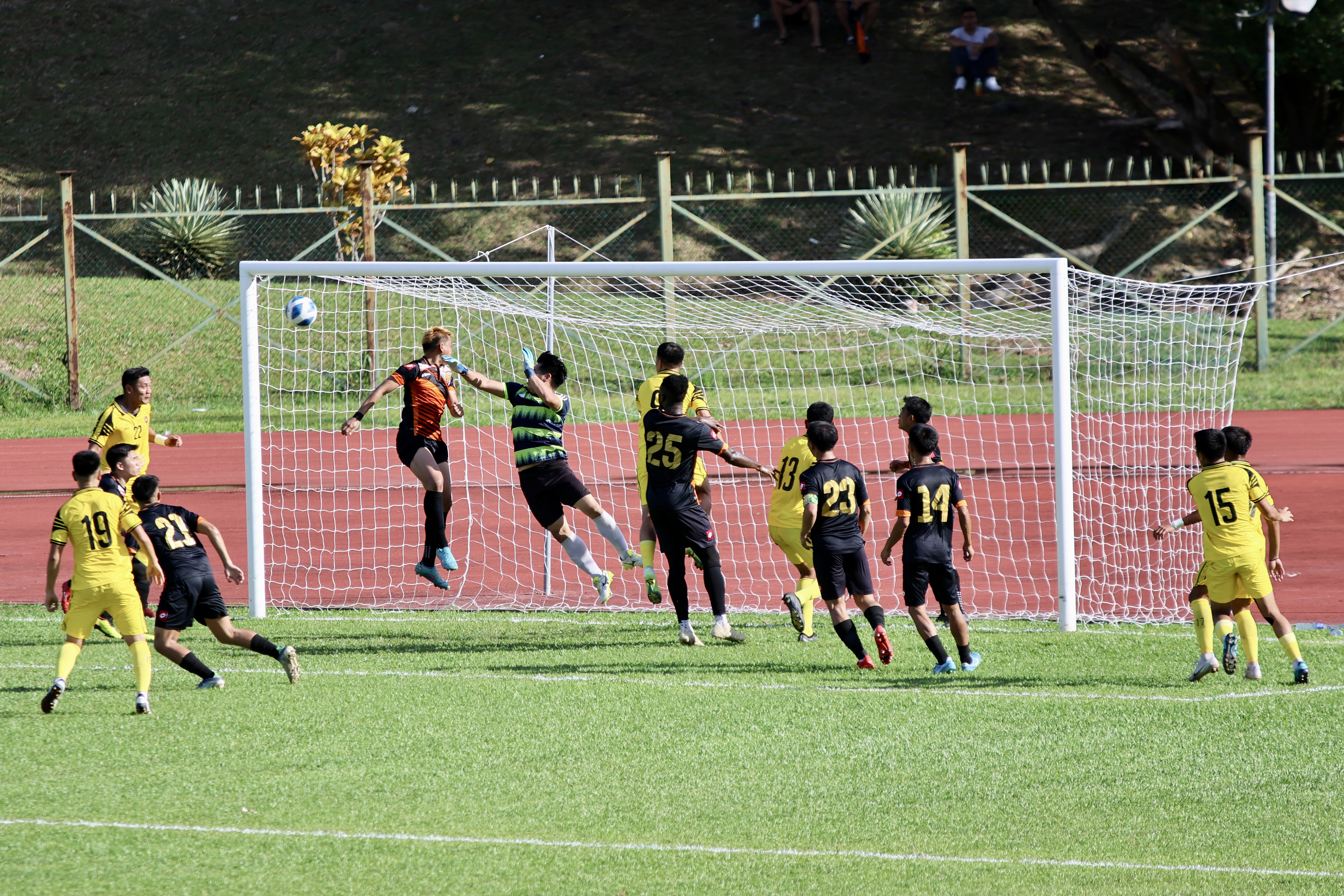
Shah Razen Said's header against Kota Ranger during the 2022 FA Cup

=== Return to Brunei and back to using first team players (2019–2022) ===
In 2019, DPMM sent a youth team to play in the 2018–19 Brunei Premier League, with three first teamers namely Azim Izamuddin Suhaimi, Abdul Azizi Ali Rahman and Azwan Ali Rahman also registered with the team. They finished in first place at the end of the season, winning promotion to the 2020 Brunei Super League. The 'B' team which began to boast import players like Shuhei Sasahara only completed two games before the season was eventually cancelled due to the COVID-19 pandemic.

Due to the first team's withdrawal from the Singapore Premier League for the 2021 season, coach Adrian Pennock announced that his team will be lacing up for the 2021 Brunei Super League that would commence in June of that year. The league was suspended three months later due to increasing COVID-19 cases in Brunei and was eventually cancelled for the second successive season.

DPMM competed in the 2022 Brunei FA Cup which was the only competition to be held for the year by the Football Association of Brunei Darussalam. On 4 December 2022, they became the winners of the competition by beating Kasuka in the final with a 2–1 score.

=== Second stint in Singapore (2023–2025) ===
DPMM began the process of returning to the Singapore Premier League after the restrictions necessitated by the pandemic eased since the year of 2022. The AFC ratified the move in August of that year. The Singapore Premier League website officially announced DPMM's participation for the 2023 season on 27 January 2023. DPMM also qualified for the 2023–24 AFC Cup qualification round for the first time in their history qualifying in the Preliminary round 2 where they face Myanmar club, Yangon United at the Thuwunna Stadium on 16 August 2023, but unfortunately DPMM conceded a last minute goal which saw them exit the tournament. They finished seventh in the league and fourth in the 2023 Singapore Cup.

In early July 2024, just six games into the season, the club had to replace coach Rui Capela who left for personal reasons, and appointed Scotsman Jamie McAllister in his place. The club endured a five-match losing streak at the start of 2025 but balanced it out towards the end of the season by winning their final six matches, finishing in fifth place in the SPL standings.

=== Back to Malaysia League (2025–present) ===
On 22 May 2025, the Football Association of Singapore announced that DPMM will depart the league after the 2024–25 season. Later that day, the Malaysian Football League confirmed the club's participation in the 2025–26 Malaysia Super League alongside 13 other clubs, with the Bruneian side designated as a guest team. DPMM have already signed Indonesian international Ramadhan Sananta and Malaysian defender Fairuz Zakaria prior to MFL's announcement. The move was made official on 3 June in a signing ceremony that took place in Johor Bahru. The club will bear the cost of travel and accommodation for every visiting team throughout the season. They played their first MSL match since returning on 8 August 2025 away against PDRM in a 2–2 draw.

On 25 October 2025, DPMM played Johor Darul Ta'zim (JDT) away in Johor Bahru, the team that has won the league for the last 11 seasons. The Bruneian side lost 10–0 and created DPMM's worst defeat in history, as well as the largest win in MSL history and also JDT's largest win in history at the time. After an inconsistent campaign, DPMM finished in tenth place in their first season back in Malaysia.

== Kit suppliers and shirt sponsors ==
From 2021 to 2025, DPMM's jerseys were supplied by Bruneian-based sportswear brand Pitch. They have now opted for German manufacturer Puma since.

DPMM features a main sponsor on their jersey starting from the 2024–25 season with Royal Brunei Airlines, who have been one of the club's main sponsors since the early days of their formation.

Period	Kit manufacturer	Shirt sponsors
2006–2020	(Italy) Lotto	No sponsor
2021–2024	(Brunei) Pitch	No sponsor
2024–2025	(Brunei) Pitch	Royal Brunei Airlines
2025–2026	(Germany) Puma	Royal Brunei Airlines
2026–	(Germany) Puma	Royal Brunei Airlines; DST

== Stadium ==
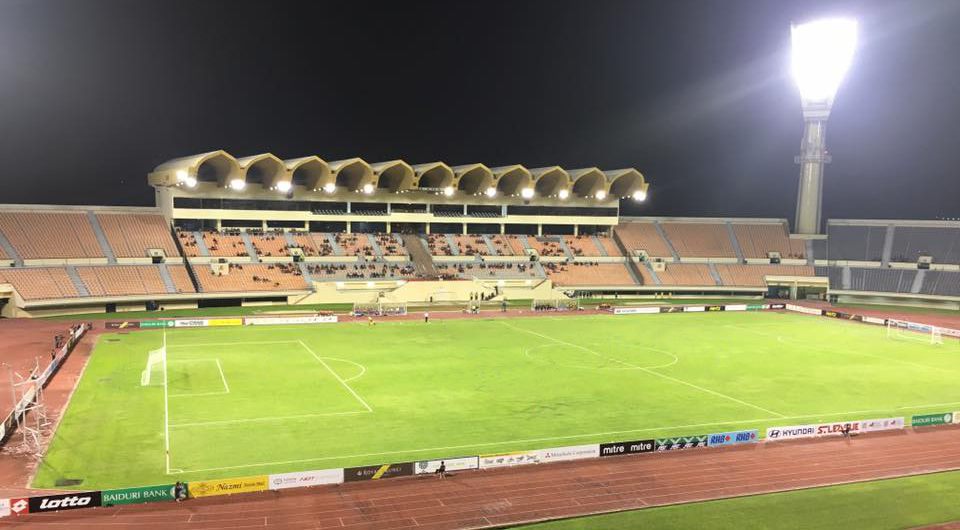
Hassanal Bolkiah National Stadium

DPMM play their home games at the Hassanal Bolkiah National Stadium. The stadium can accommodate 28,000 spectators. The building is oriented in a north–south direction with the grandstand located at the western section. It has a football field which fulfills FIFA standards, as well as the running track which fulfills IAAF standards. The stadium has a video-matrix scoreboard located at the northern section; it can display both Latin and Jawi writing.

On 20 April 2024, DPMM returned to playing at the Hassanal Bolkiah National Stadium after a period of unavailability due to renovation, winning 3–1 in a pre-season friendly against China League One side Guangxi Pingguo Haliao. On 22 June, DPMM played their first league match since 2019 where they drew against Geylang International 3–3.

== Players ==
=== Current squad ===
As of 23 August 2026

Note: Flags indicate national team as defined under FIFA eligibility rules; some limited exceptions apply. Players may hold more than one non-FIFA nationality.

No.	Pos.	Nation	Player
1	GK	MAS	Samuel Somerville
2	DF	BRU	Syafiq Safiuddin
3	DF	MAS	Tommy Mawat Bada (on loan from KL City)
4	DF	GHA	Ebenezer Abban
5	DF	PHI	Amani Aguinaldo
6	DF	SCO	Clark Robertson
7	MF	BRU	Azwan Ali Rahman (Captain)
9	MF	MAS	Danial Asri
10	FW	POR	Miguel Oliveira
11	DF	IDN	Muhammad Toha
12	GK	BRU	Haimie Abdullah Nyaring
13	DF	BRU	Hanif Hamir
14	DF	BRU	Martin Haddy Khallidden

No.	Pos.	Nation	Player
16	MF	BRU	Abdul Hariz Herman
17	FW	BRU	Hakeme Yazid Said
18	FW	GUA	Óscar Santis (on loan from Antigua GFC)
19	DF	BRU	Nur Ikhwan Othman
20	DF	MAS	Nicholas Swirad
21	DF	BRU	Nazry Aiman Azaman
23	DF	BRU	Yura Indera Putera
25	GK	BRU	Ishyra Asmin Jabidi
27	FW	AUS	Jordan Murray
29	FW	MAS	Farris Izdiham
42	MF	FIN	Felipe Aspegren
94	FW	BRA	Dalberto

== Management and staff ==
=== Management ===
Position	Staff
Chairman	(Brunei) Al-Muhtadee Billah
Vice-chairman	(Brunei) Abdul Rahim Kemaluddin Al-Haj
Team manager	(Brunei) Mohamad Ali Momin
Assistant team manager	(Brunei) Rosmin Kamis

=== Technical staff ===
Position	Staff
Head coach	(Scotland) Jamie McAllister
Assistant coach	(Brunei) Helme Panjang (Brunei) Moksen Mohammad
Goalkeeping coach	(Brazil) Leandro Jose Ribeiro
Fitness coach	(Czech Republic) Denis Kavan
Marketing manager	(Brunei) Momin Ja'afar
Kitman	(Brunei) Kasim Amit
Physiotherapist	(Brunei) Faisal Hashim
Masseur	(Brunei) Husaini Kahar
Team doctor	(Brunei) Long Shi Ying (Malaysia) Nurabrar Hussin (Malaysia) Gregory Parameswaran Libau

== Honours ==
=== League ===
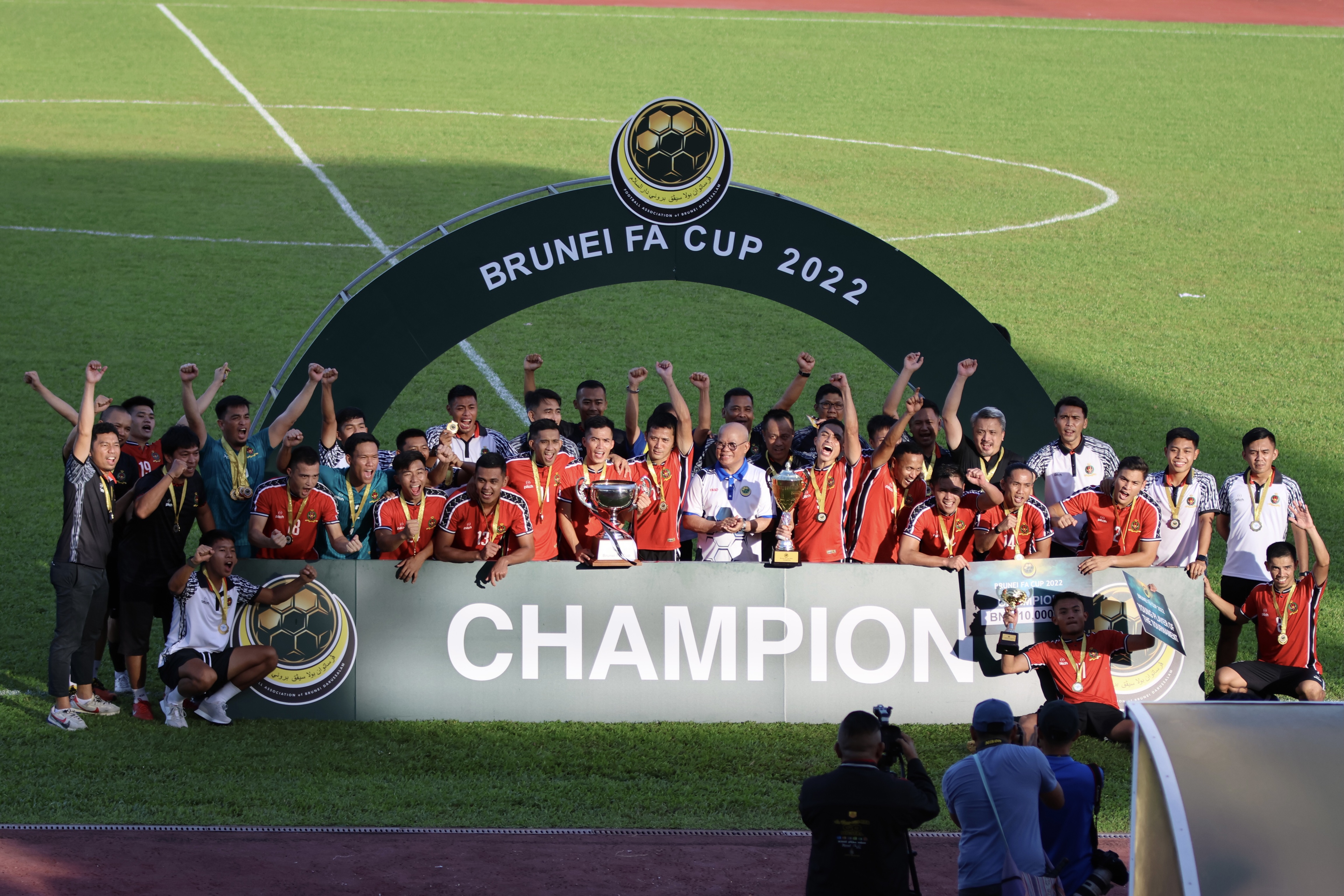
DPMM winning the 2022 Brunei FA Cup

==== Brunei ====
- Brunei Premier League
  - Champions (3): 2002, 2004, 2018–19
  - Runners-up (1): 2003
- Pepsi Cup League
  - Runners-up (1): 2001

==== Singapore ====
- Singapore Premier League
  - Champions (2): 2015, 2019
  - Runners-up (2): 2012, 2014

=== Cups ===
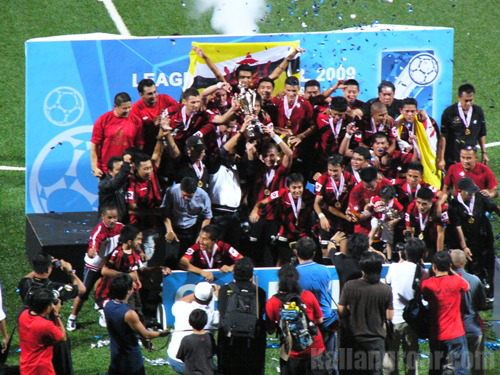
DPMM winning the 2009 Singapore League Cup

==== Brunei ====
- Pengiran Sengamara Di Raja Cup
  - Runners-up (1): 2000
- DPMM Invitational Cup
  - Champions (1): 2002
- Brunei Invitational Cup
  - Champions (1): 2002
- Brunei Super Cup
  - Champions (2): 2002, 2004
- Brunei FA Cup
  - Champions (3): 2004, 2022, 2025

==== Singapore ====
- Singapore Cup
  - Runners-up (1): 2018
- Singapore League Cup
  - Champions (3): 2009, 2012, 2014
  - Runner-up (2): 2013, 2016
- Singapore Community Shield
  - Runners-up (1): 2016

== Records and statistics ==
As of 23 June 2026

=== Top 10 all-time appearances ===
Appearances statistics below are only based on records from the 2009 S.League season onwards, includes cup games.

Rank	Player	Years	Appearances
1	(Brunei) Azwan Ali Rahman	2013–present	272
2	(Brunei) Azwan Saleh	2006–2025	269+
3	(Brunei) Wardun Yussof	2004, 2005–2024	238+
4	(Brunei) Shah Razen Said	2005–2022	226+
5	(Brunei) Helmi Zambin	2009–2024	226
6	(Brunei) Rosmin Kamis	2004–2009, 2012–2017	213+
7	(Brunei) Hendra Azam Idris	2012–2024	213
8	(Brunei) Najib Tarif	2012–2026	201
9	(Brunei) Yura Indera Putera	2015–present	170
10	(Brunei) Adi Said	2012–2018, 2019	161

=== Top 10 all-time scorers ===
Goal statistics below are only based on records from the 2002 B-League season onwards, includes cup games.

Rank	Player	Appearances	Total goals
1	(Brunei) Shah Razen Said	226+	101
2	(Nigeria) Ajayi Oluseye		76+
3	(Brazil) Rafael Ramazotti	89	66
4	(Brunei) Azwan Ali Rahman	272	60
5	(Brazil) Rodrigo Tosi	54	58
6	(Belarus) Andrey Voronkov	59	58
7	(Brunei) Hakeme Yazid Said	88	47
8	(Brunei) Adi Said	161	41
9	(Australia) Peter Grierson		30
10	(Brunei) Rosmin Kamis	213+	27

- Biggest win: 18–0 vs Seri Wira (13 August 2022)
- Heaviest Defeat: 0–10 vs Johor Darul Ta'zim (25 October 2025)
- Youngest goal scorer: Hakeme Yazid Said ~ 16 years 5 months 25 days (2 August 2019 vs Geylang International)
- Oldest goal scorer: Abdul Azizi Ali Rahman ~ 36 years 5 months 21 days (8 July 2023 vs Albirex Niigata Singapore)
- Youngest debutant: Hakeme Yazid Said ~ 16 years 5 months 25 days (2 August 2019 vs Geylang International)
- Oldest fielded player: Alizanda Sitom ~ 46 years, 9 months and 26 days (25 May 2017 vs Home United)

== Notable players ==
As of 2026–27 season.

=== International capped players ===
AFC/OFC.: (Afghanistan) Farshad Noor; (Australia) Patrick Flottmann; (Indonesia) Muhammad Toha; (Indonesia) Ramadhan Sananta; (Malaysia) Danial Asri; (Malaysia) Samuel Somerville; (Malaysia) Tommy Mawat Bada; (Philippines) Amani Aguinaldo; (Uzbekistan) Akmal Tursunbaev	CAF.: (Ghana) Ebenezer Abban; (Ghana) Ibrahim Sulley	UEFA.: (Belarus) Andrey Varankow; (Bosnia and Herzegovina) Boris Raspudić; (Croatia) Dino Drpić; (Croatia) Ivan Bošnjak; (Finland) Felipe Aspegren; (Iceland) Damir Muminovic; (Republic of Ireland) Billy Mehmet; (Republic of Ireland) Joe Gamble; (Republic of Ireland) Roy O'Donovan; (Latvia) Dāvis Ikaunieks; (Lithuania) Artūras Rimkevičius; (North Macedonia) Kristijan Naumovski; (Northern Ireland) Brian McLean; (Portugal) Joao Moreira; (Portugal) Paulo Sérgio; (Scotland) Clark Robertson; (Spain) Ángel Martínez; (Ukraine) Volodymyr Pryyomov	CONMEBOL/ CONCACAF.: (Chile) Daúd Gazale; (Guatemala) Óscar Santis; (Guadeloupe) Stéphane Auvray

== Managerial history ==
=== Performance by coach ===
The following table provides a summary of the coach appointed by the club.

Coach	Season	Achievements
(Slovenia) Sandi Sejdinovski	15 July 2000–30 June 2002	No sponsor
(Bulgaria) Yordan Stoykov	1 July 2002–31 December 2002	– 2002 Brunei Premier League
(Malaysia) Azman Eusoff	1 January 2003–3 March 2004	
(Bosnia and Herzegovina) Amir Alagic	5 March 2004–14 March 2005	– 2004 Brunei Premier League – 2004 Brunei FA Cup – Brunei Super Cup
(England) Graham Paddon	14 March 2005–1 July 2005	
(Croatia) Ranko Buketa	1 July 2005–30 June 2007	
(Bulgaria) Yordan Stoykov (2)	1 July 2007–10 March 2008	
(Croatia) Vjeran Simunić	11 March 2008–27 October 2009	– 2009 Singapore League Cup
Banned by FIFA
(Croatia) Vjeran Simunić (2)	1 October 2011–7 November 2013	– 2012 Singapore League Cup
(Scotland) Steve Kean	28 November 2013–30 November 2017	– 2015 S.League
(Brazil) Renê Weber	1 January 2018–14 October 2018	
(England) Adrian Pennock	15 October 2018–31 December 2023	– 2019 Singapore Premier League
(Brunei) Helme Panjang	1 July 2022–31 December 2022	– 2022 Brunei FA Cup
(Portugal) Rui Capela	1 January 2024–5 July 2024	
(Portugal) Miguel Bragança (caretaker)	9 July 2024–14 July 2024	
(Scotland) Jamie McAllister	15 July 2024–present	

=== Performance by competition ===
==== League ====
The following table provides a summary of the result by season.

Season	League	Pos.	Pl.	W	D	L	GS	GA	P	Brunei FA Cup/ Malaysia FA Cup	Singapore Cup	Malaysia Cup/ (Singapore) Singapore League Cup	Top goalscorer	Goals
2001	(Brunei) Pepsi Cup	2nd	8	7	0	1	42	4	15				(Brunei) Radiman Abdul Rahman	17
2002	(Brunei) B-League	1st	14	13	1	0	55	16	40	Quarter-finals			(United States) Sean Lockhart	10
2003	(Brunei) B-League	2nd	18	14	2	2	65	12	44	Round 2			(Nigeria) Ajayi Oluseye	28
2004	(Brunei) B-League	1st	18	17	1	0	81	7	52	Winners	First round		(Nigeria) Ajayi Oluseye	30
2005	(Brunei) B-League	Withdrew								Quarter-finals			(Croatia) Goran Vujanović	17
2005–06	Malaysia Premier League	3rd	21	9	6	6	40	33	33		First round	Group Stage	(Brazil) Tiago dos Santos	10
2006–07	Malaysia Super League	3rd	24	13	5	6	46	29	44		First round		(Brunei) Shahrazen Said	21
2007–08	Malaysia Super League	10th	24	4	10	10	27	34	22	First round	First round		(Brunei) Shahrazen Said (Brunei) Rosmin Kamis	5
2009	(Singapore) S.League	Expelled from the league									Quarter-finals	Winners	(Brunei) Shahrazen Said	8
2010–11	Banned by FIFA													
2012	(Singapore) S.League	2nd	24	15	3	6	49	26	48		Preliminary	Winners	(Brunei) Shahrazen Said	13
2013	(Singapore) S.League	8th	27	9	8	10	38	48	35		Quarter Final	Runners-up	(Brazil) Rodrigo Tosi	8
2014	(Singapore) S.League	2nd	27	15	5	7	63	30	50		Third Place	Winners	(Brazil) Rodrigo Tosi	24
2015	(Singapore) S.League	1st	27	15	7	5	48	26	52		Third Place	First Round	(Brazil) Rafael Ramazotti	21
2016	(Singapore) S.League	3rd	24	12	5	7	47	37	41		Quarter Final	Runners-up	(Brazil) Rafael Ramazotti	20
2017	(Singapore) S.League	8th	24	5	2	17	30	61	17		Quarter Final	Semi Final	(Brazil) Rafael Ramazotti	14
2018	Singapore Premier League	3rd	24	11	8	5	46	38	41		Runners-up		(Ukraine) Volodymyr Pryyomov	18
2019	Singapore Premier League	1st	24	15	5	4	51	25	50		Fourth Place		(Belarus) Andrey Varankow	21
2020	Singapore Premier League	Withdrew											(England) Charlie Clough (Belarus) Andrey Varankow	1
2021	Brunei Super League	League abandoned											(Belarus) Andrey Varankow	22
2022	No league competition									Winners			(Brunei) Shahrazen Said	19
2023	Singapore Premier League	7th	24	6	5	13	39	43	23		Fourth Place		(Brunei) Hakeme Yazid Said	12
2024–25	Singapore Premier League	5th	32	12	8	12	54	61	44		Semi-finals		(Latvia) Dāvis Ikaunieks	14
2025–26	Malaysia Super League	10th	24	6	5	13	30	57	23	Round of 16		Quarter-finals	(Australia) Jordan Murray	10
2026–27	Malaysia Super League		22							Semi-finals				

== Continental record ==
Season	Competition	Round	Club	Home	Away	Aggregate
2002–03	AFC Champions League	Qualifiers Round 2	(Singapore) Geylang United	0–3	4–0	0–7
2003	ASEAN Club Championship	Group B	(Malaysia) Perak FA	3–0		3rd
2003	ASEAN Club Championship	Group B	Singapore Armed Forces	2–2		3rd
2005	ASEAN Club Championship	Group B	Thailand Tobacco Monopoly	2–2		2nd
2005	ASEAN Club Championship	Group B	(Myanmar) Finance and Revenue	1–2		2nd
2005	ASEAN Club Championship	Group B	(Singapore) Tampines Rovers	0–1		2nd
2005	ASEAN Club Championship	Semi-final	(Malaysia) Pahang	1–0		
2023–24	AFC Cup	Preliminary Round 2	(Myanmar) Yangon United	1–2		
