= Brunei Premier League =

DST Brunei Premier League
- Founded: 1985; 41 years ago
- Folded: 2019
- Country: Brunei Darussalam
- Confederation: AFC (Asia)
- Number of clubs: 8
- Level on pyramid: 2
- Domestic cup(s): Brunei FA Cup; Brunei Super Cup
- Last champions: DPMM FC (2018–19)
- Most championships: QAF FC (3 titles); DPMM FC (3 titles)
- Website: www.nfabd.org
- Current: 2018–19 Season

The Brunei Premier League (Malay: Liga Perdana Brunei) is the second tier of the football pyramid of Brunei. It was Brunei's top-tier football league until 2012, when the Brunei Super League was created. The Premier League falls under the management of the National Football Association of Brunei Darussalam.

== History ==
From 1985 to 1993, the champions of the four districts (Belait, Brunei-Muara, Temburong, Tutong) entered into the National Championship playoff. The tournament was not played between 1994 and 2001. The Brunei Premier League was created in 2002, and it was the top-tier league until 2012, when it was replaced by the Brunei Super League.

From 2014 until 2019 it was made into a second tier competition. It is slated to return in 2026.

== Teams ==
A total of 8 teams competed in the 2018–19 season.

- BSRC FT
- DPMM FC II
- Jerudong FC
- Panchor Murai FC
- Rainbow FC
- Rimba Star FC
- Seri Wira FC
- Tabuan Muda

== Stadiums ==
- Track & Field Sports Complex, Bandar Seri Begawan
- Berakas Sports Complex, Berakas
- Jerudong Park Mini Stadium, Jerudong
- Tutong Sports Complex, Tutong
- Brunei Shell Recreation Club Field, Panaga
- NFABD Field, Bandar Seri Begawan

== Champions ==
Previous winners are:

National Championship play-off winners:

- 1985: Angkatan Bersenjata
- 1986: Daerah Brunei
- 1987: Kota Ranger FC
- 1988: Kuala Belait FC
- 1989: Muara Stars FC
- 1990–92: not played
- 1993: Kota Ranger FC
- 1994-01: not played

Brunei Premier League (B-League)

- 2002: DPMM FC
- 2003: Wijaya FC
- 2004: DPMM FC
- 2005–06: QAF FC
- 2006–07: not held
- 2007–08: QAF FC
- 2008–09: not held
- 2009–10: QAF FC
- 2011: suspended
- 2014: Lun Bawang
- 2015: Kota Ranger FC
- 2016: Al-Idrus Junior
- 2017: Setia Perdana FC
- 2018–19: DPMM FC

== Top scorers ==
year	best scorers	team	goals
2002	(Brunei) Fadlin Galawat	AH United	18
2003	(Nigeria) Ajayi Oluseye	DPMM FC	28
2004	(Nigeria) Ajayi Oluseye	DPMM FC	30
2005/06	(Cameroon) Viban Francis Bayong	QAF FC	33
2007/08	(Cameroon) Viban Francis Bayong (Brunei) Budiman Jumat	QAF FC; MS ABDB	18
2009/10	(Cameroon) Viban Francis Bayong	QAF FC	19
2014	(Brunei) Shafiq Abdullah Elan	Lun Bawang	6
2015	(Brunei) Rahimni Pundut	Setia Perdana	16
2016	(Brunei) Nurhidayat Abbas	Menglait FC	16
2017	(Brunei) Abang Fakhri Abang Jaludin (Brunei) Nurhidayatullah Zaini	Tunas FC; IKLS FC	9
2018/19	(Brunei) Hakeme Yazid Said	DPMM FC	9
