= Brunei FA Cup =

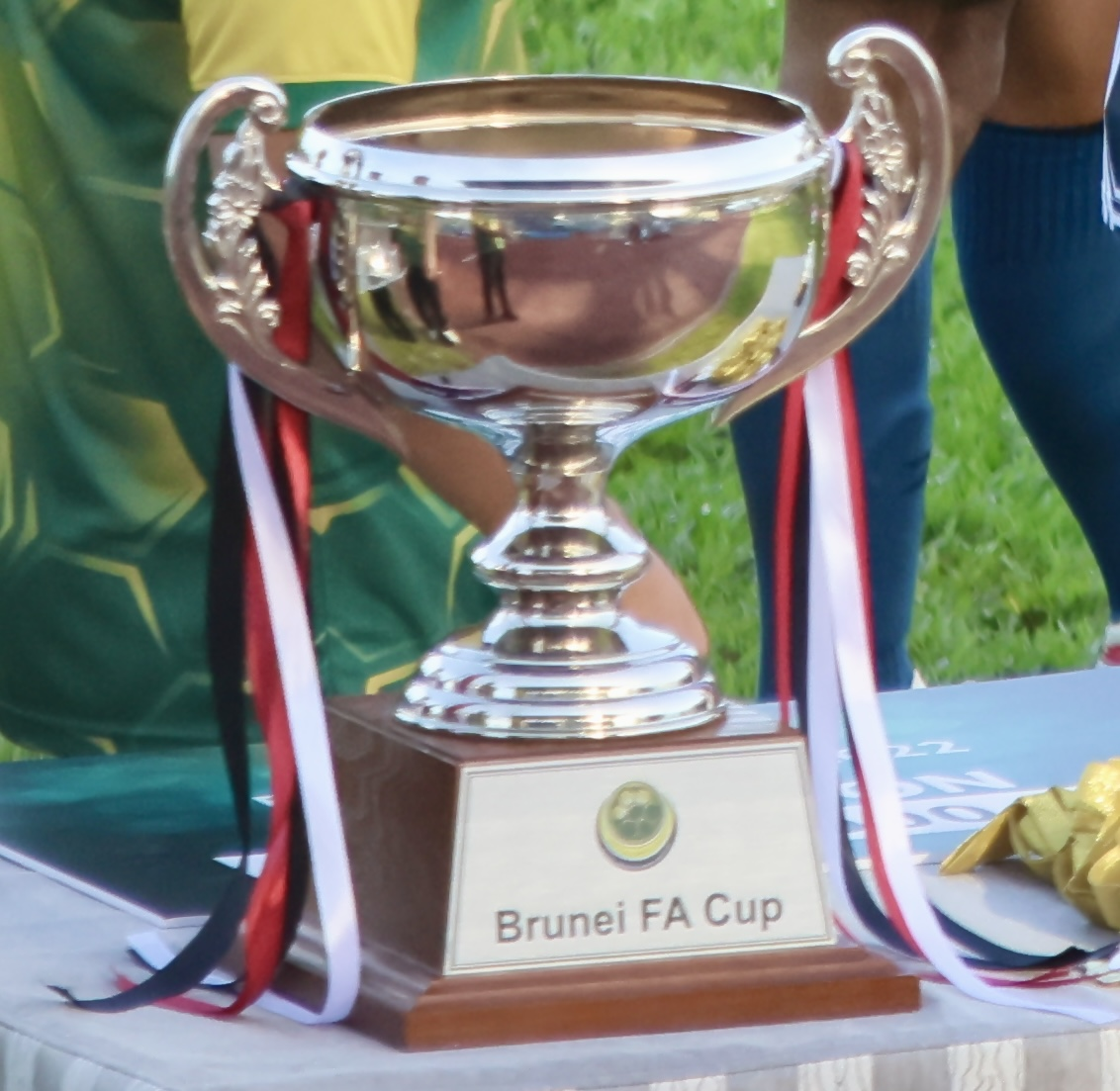
- Brunei FA Cup
- Organiser(s): FABD
- Founded: 2002; 24 years ago
- Region: Brunei
- Teams: 12
- Current champions: DPMM FC II (2025) (1st title)
- Most championships: MS ABDB (7 titles)
- 2026 Brunei FA Cup

The Brunei FA Cup is Brunei's premier knockout tournament in men's football. The current format is administered by the Football Association of Brunei Darussalam (FABD) since 2012.

The championship winner will receive B$10,000 and first runner up will get B$7,000 ($5,000 USD) as prize money.

== Participation ==
Previously all football clubs that have registered with the NFABD were eligible to enter the FA Cup, including non-league teams such as FC Phosphor. Due to more stringent regulations, from the 2017 edition onwards only teams from the Brunei Super League and Premier League can enter.

- 2012 = 44 teams
- 2014/15 = 36 teams
- 2015 = 28 teams
- 2016 = 28 teams
- 2017 = 20 teams
- 2018/19 = 17 teams
- 2022 = 32 teams
- 2025 = 12 teams

== Finals ==
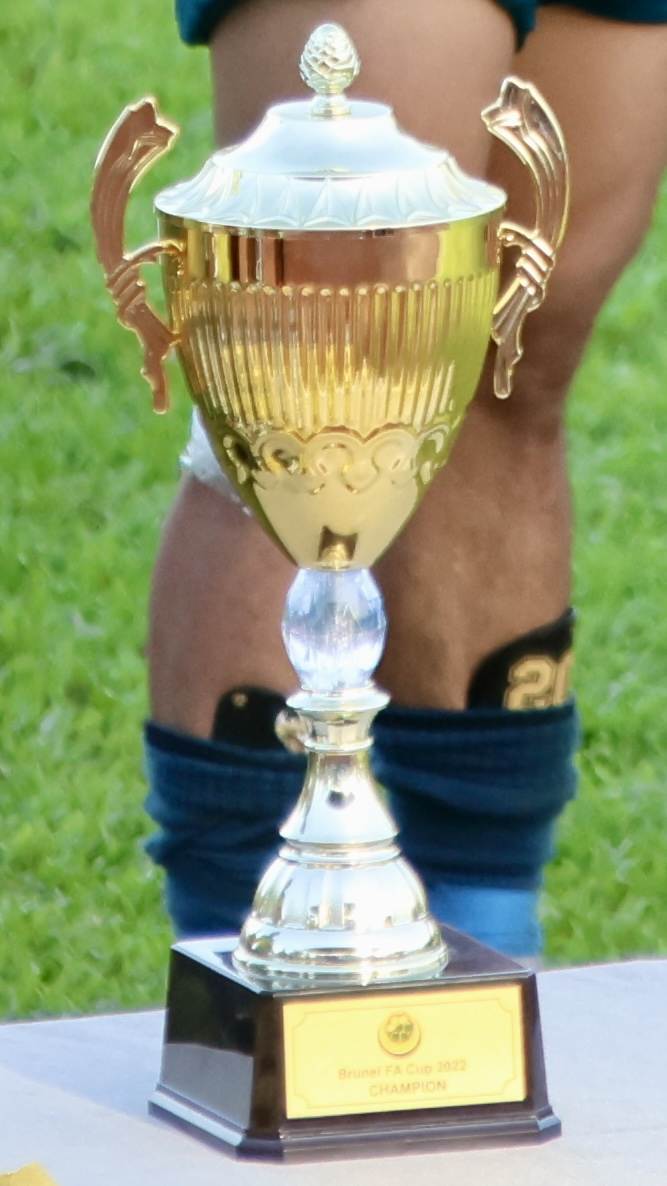
Brunei FA Cup Champions trophy

Winners so far are:

Organiser	Year	Winners	Runners–up	Score	Venue	Source
BAFA	2002	Wijaya	ABDB	1–0	Hassanal Bolkiah National Stadium	
BAFA	2003	ABDB	Kota Ranger	3–0	Hassanal Bolkiah National Stadium	
BAFA	2004–05	DPMM	ABDB	0–0 (3–1 pen.)	JBS Field	
BAFA	2005–06	AH United	ABDB	2–2 (4–3 pen.)	Hassanal Bolkiah National Stadium	
BAFA	2007	MS ABDB	Wijaya	1–0	Hassanal Bolkiah National Stadium	
BAFA	2008–09	Not held				
FFBD	2010	MS ABDB	QAF	2–1	Hassanal Bolkiah National Stadium	
NFABD	2012	MS ABDB	Indera	1–0 (a.e.t.)	Hassanal Bolkiah National Stadium	
NFABD	2013	Not held				
NFABD	2014	MS ABDB	Najip	2–0	Hassanal Bolkiah National Stadium	
NFABD	2015	MS ABDB	Indera	3–2	Hassanal Bolkiah National Stadium	
NFABD	2016	MS ABDB	Najip	1–0	Berakas Sports Complex	
NFABD	2017–18	Indera	MS PDB	2–0	Berakas Sports Complex	
NFABD	2018–19	Kota Ranger	MS PDB	2–1	Track and Field Sports Complex	
NFABD	2019–20	Not held				
FABD	2021	Not held				
FABD	2022	DPMM	Kasuka	2–1	Track and Field Sports Complex	
FABD	2023–24	Not held				
FABD	2025	DPMM II	Indera	1–0	Hassanal Bolkiah National Stadium	

== Performance by club ==
Team	Champions	Runners-up	Top 2
MS ABDB	7 (2003, 2007, 2010, 2012, 2014, 2015, 2016)	3 (2002, 2004–05. 2005–06)	10
DPMM FC	2 (2004–05, 2022)		2
Indera SC	1 (2017–18)	3 (2012, 2015, 2025)	4
Wijaya FC	1 (2002)	1 (2007)	2
Kota Ranger FC	1 (2018–19)	1 (2003)	2
AH United	1 (2005–06)		1
DPMM FC II	1 (2025)		1
Najip FC		2 (2014, 2016)	2
MS PDB		2 (2017–18, 2018–19)	2
QAF FC		1 (2010)	1
Kasuka FC		1 (2022)	1
