= 2017 DPMM FC season =

17th season in existence of DPMM FC

DPMM FC
2017 season
- Chairman: HRH Prince Al-Muhtadee Billah
- Head coach: Steve Kean
- Stadium: Hassanal Bolkiah National Stadium
- S.League: 8th
- Singapore Cup: Quarter-finals
- League Cup: Semi-finals
Home colours	Away colours

The 2017 season is DPMM FC's 6th consecutive season in the top flight of Singapore football and in the S.League. Along with the S.League, the club will also compete in the Singapore Cup and the Singapore League Cup.

== Squad ==
=== S.League squad ===
As of 24 March 2017.

Squad no.	Name	Nationality	Position(s)	Date of birth (age)	Previous club
Goalkeepers
1	Alizanda Sitom	(Brunei)	GK	29 July 1970 (age 56)	Brunei FA
24	Mu'izzuddin Ismail	(Brunei)	GK	10 February 1987 (age 39)	(Brunei) MS PDB
25	Wardun Yussof	(Brunei)	GK	14 September 1981 (age 45)	(Brunei) Majra FC
Defenders
2	Reduan Petara	(Brunei)	DF	25 May 1988 (age 38)	(Brunei) Indera SC
3	Abdul Mu'iz Sisa	(Brunei)	DF	20 April 1991 (age 35)	(Brunei) Indera SC
4	Haizul Rani Metusin	(Brunei)	DF	1 May 1984 (age 42)	(Brunei) MS ABDB
5	Hanif Hamir	(Brunei)	DF	22 February 1997 (age 29)	(Brunei) Tabuan Muda
14	Helmi Zambin	(Brunei)	DF	30 March 1987 (age 39)	(Brunei) Indera SC
18	Aminuddin Zakwan Tahir	(Brunei)	DF	24 October 1994 (age 31)	(Brunei) Najip FC
21	Vincent Salas	(Chile)	DF	2 April 1989 (age 37)	(Chile) Puerto Montt
23	Yura Indera Putera Yunos	(Brunei)	DF	25 March 1996 (age 30)	(Brunei) Majra FC
Midfielders
6	Azwan Saleh	(Brunei)	MF	1 June 1988 (age 38)	(Brunei) Indera SC
7	Azwan Ali Rahman	(Brunei)	MF	11 January 1992 (age 34)	(Brunei) Indera SC
8	Hendra Azam Idris	(Brunei)	MF	10 August 1988 (age 38)	(Brunei) QAF FC
10	Nur Ikhwan Othman	(Brunei)	MF	15 January 1993 (age 33)	(Brunei) Indera SC
11	Najib Tarif	(Brunei)	MF	5 February 1988 (age 38)	(Brunei) MS PDB
12	Maududi Hilmi Kasmi	(Brunei)	MF	5 February 1989 (age 37)	(Brunei) Najip FC
13	Rosmin Kamis	(Brunei)	MF	17 June 1981 (age 45)	(Brunei) MS ABDB
15	Azim Izamuddin Suhaimi	(Brunei)	MF	20 May 1997 (age 29)	(Brunei) Tabuan Muda
16	Khairul Anwar Abdul Rahim	(Brunei)	MF	31 August 1994 (age 32)	(Brunei) Indera SC
17	Hazwan Hamzah	(Brunei)	MF	9 September 1991 (age 35)	(Brunei) Indera SC
Strikers
9	Daúd Gazale	(Chile)	FW	10 August 1984 (age 42)	(Chile) Audax Italiano
19	Rafael Ramazotti	(Brazil)	FW	8 September 1988 (age 38)	(Japan) Gainare Tottori
20	Adi Said	(Brunei)	FW	15 October 1990 (age 35)	(Brunei) Majra FC
22	Shahrazen Said	(Brunei)	FW	14 December 1985 (age 40)	(Brunei) Wijaya FC

== Coaching staff ==
Position	Name	Ref.
Head coach	(Scotland) Steve Kean	
Assistant coach	(Brunei) Moksen Mohammad	
Goalkeeping coach	(Brunei) Haji Zainol Ariffin	
Team manager	(Brunei) Mohammad Ali bin Hj Momin	
Physiotherapist	(Brunei) Faisal bin Hashim & Masri bin Tahir	
Kitman	(Brunei) Ambotang Palatuwi	
Assistant coach	(France) Taoufik Harzi	

== Transfers ==
=== Pre-season transfers ===
==== In ====
Position	Player	Transferred From	Ref
GK	(Brunei) Alizanda Sitom	Unattached	
GK	(Brunei) Mu'izzuddin Ismail	(Brunei) MS PDB	
DF	(Brunei) Hanif Hamir	(Brunei) Tabuan Muda	
DF	(France) François Marque	(Switzerland) FC Le Mont	
MF	(Brunei) Abdul Afiq Roslan	(Brunei) Tabuan Muda	
FW	(Republic of Ireland) Billy Mehmet	(Singapore) Tampines Rovers	
DF	(Serbia) Željko Savić	(Finland) PS Kemi	

==== Out ====
Position	Player	Transferred To	Ref
GK	(Brunei) Azman Ilham Noor	(Brunei) Kota Ranger FC	
GK	(Brunei) Abdul Hafiz Abdul Rahim		
DF	(Scotland) Brian McLean	(Scotland) Hibernian	
DF	(Brunei) Abdul Aziz Tamit	(Brunei) Kasuka FC	
DF	(Brunei) Sairol Sahari	(Brunei) Kasuka FC	
DF	(Brunei) Na'im Tarif		
MF	(Portugal) Paulo Sérgio	(Indonesia) Bhayangkara F.C.	
DF	(France) François Marque	(Switzerland) Yverdon Sport FC	

=== Mid-season transfers ===
==== In ====
Position	Player	Transferred From	Ref
DF	(Chile) Vincent Salas	(Chile) Puerto Montt	
FW	(Chile) Daúd Gazale	(Chile) Audax Italiano	
DF	(Brunei) Haizul Rani Metusin	(Brunei) MS ABDB	
MF	(Brunei) Hazwan Hamzah	(Brunei) Indera SC	

==== Out ====
Position	Player	Transferred To	Ref
FW	(Republic of Ireland) Billy Mehmet	(Northern Cyprus) Alsancak Yeşilova	
DF	(Serbia) Željko Savić		
DF	(Brunei) Fakharrazi Hassan	(Brunei) MS ABDB	
MF	(Brunei) Abdul Afiq Roslan	(Brunei) Najip I-Team	

=== On Trial ===
Position	Player	From	Ref
DF	(Pakistan) Zesh Rehman	(Malaysia) Pahang FC	
DF	(Spain) Bidari García	(Cyprus) Nacional Potosí	
DF	(Croatia) Ivan Fustar	(Croatia) RNK Split	
FW	(Scotland) Shaun Maloney	(England) Hull City F.C.	

== Friendlies ==
Win Draw Loss

27 January 2017 Pre-Season Friendly	Navy FC (Thailand)	2–2	(Brunei) DPMM FC	Sattahip Navy Stadium
	Goal		Ramazotti

28 January 2017 Pre-Season Friendly	Rayong F.C. (Thailand)	2–2	(Brunei) DPMM FC	Rayong Stadium
	Goal		Billy Mehmet; Ramazotti

30 January 2017 Pre-Season Friendly	Chainat Hornbill F.C. (Thailand)	2–2	(Brunei) DPMM FC	Khao Plong Stadium
	Ramazotti (og)		Ramazotti; Shahrazen

31 January 2017 Pre-Season Friendly	Kasetsart F.C. (Thailand)	1–1	(Brunei) DPMM FC	Boonyachinda Stadium
		Report	Ramazotti

23 November 2017 Post-Season Friendly	DPMM FC (Brunei)	3–0	(India) FC Goa	Jerudong Mini Stadium
	Fakharrazi 14', 28'; Khairul Anwar	Report

24 November 2017 Post-Season Friendly	DPMM FC (Brunei)	5–1	(India) FC Goa	Hassanal Bolkiah National Stadium
21:00	Rosmin 8'; Ramazotti 14', 19', 88'; Najib 78'	Report	Maingiang 61'

== Team statistics ==
=== Appearances and goals ===
No.	Pos.	Player	League		Singapore Cup		League Cup		Total	
No.	Pos.	Player	Apps.	Goals	Apps.	Goals	Apps.	Goals	Apps.	Goals
1	GK	(Brunei) Alizanda Sitom	4	0	0	0	0	0	4	0
2	DF	(Brunei) Reduan Petara	5+2	0	0	0	0	0	7	0
3	DF	(Brunei) Abdul Mu'iz Sisa	6+4	0	0+1	0	0	0	10	0
4	DF	(Brunei) Haizul Rani Metusin	10+1	0	2	0	4	0	17	0
5	DF	(Brunei) Hanif Hamir	6	0	1	0	4	0	11	0
6	MF	(Brunei) Azwan Saleh	17+3	0	2	0	4	0	26	0
7	MF	(Brunei) Azwan Ali Rahman	19+2	5	0	0	3	2	24	7
8	MF	(Brunei) Hendra Azam Idris	17+2	1	0+1	0	0+4	0	24	1
9	FW	(Chile) Daúd Gazale	8+1	2	1	0	0+1	0	11	2
10	MF	(Brunei) Nur Ikhwan Othman	12+6	0	2	0	3	0	23	0
11	MF	(Brunei) Najib Tarif	14+3	0	2	0	3	0	22	0
12	MF	(Brunei) Maududi Hilmi Kasmi	8+2	0	1	0	4	2	15	2
13	MF	(Brunei) Rosmin Kamis (captain)	20	0	1+1	0	2+2	0	26	0
14	DF	(Brunei) Helmi Zambin	12+3	0	1	1	0+3	1	20	2
15	MF	(Brunei) Azim Izamuddin Suhaimi	0+3	0	0	0	0	0	3	0
16	MF	(Brunei) Khairul Anwar Abdul Rahim	0+2	0	0	0	1+1	0	4	0
17	MF	(Brunei) Hazwan Hamzah	10+3	0	2	0	0+1	0	16	0
18	DF	(Brunei) Aminuddin Zakwan Tahir	1	0	0	0	0	0	1	0
19	FW	(Brazil) Rafael Ramazotti	20	14	2	1	0	0	22	15
20	FW	(Brunei) Adi Said	17+4	5	1+1	0	4	3	27	8
21	DF	(Chile) Vincent Salas	10	0	2	0	4	0	16	0
22	FW	(Brunei) Shahrazen Said	2+12	2	0+2	0	4	2	20	4
23	DF	(Brunei) Yura Indera Putera Yunos	9+5	0	0	0	0	0	14	0
24	GK	(Brunei) Mu'izzuddin Ismail	12+1	0	2	0	4	0	19	0
25	GK	(Brunei) Wardun Yussof	8	0	0	0	0	0	8	0
Players who have played this season but had left the club or on loan to other club
4	DF	(Brunei) Fakharrazi Hassan	0+1	0	0	0	0	0	1	0
9	FW	(Republic of Ireland) Billy Mehmet	8	2	0	0	0	0	8	2
17	MF	(Brunei) Abdul Afiq Roslan	0	0	0	0	0	0	0	0
21	DF	(France) François Marque	1	0	0	0	0	0	1	0
21	DF	(Serbia) Željko Savić	7	0	0	0	0	0	7	0

== Competitions ==
=== Overview ===
Competition	Record							
Competition	P	W	D	L	GF	GA	GD	Win %
S.League	24	5	2	17	30	61	−31	20.83
Singapore Cup	2	0	0	2	2	6	−4	0.00
League Cup	4	2	1	1	12	9	+3	50.00
Total	30	7	3	20	44	76	−32	23.33

=== S.League ===
Win Draw Loss

3 March 2017 Round 1	DPMM FC (Brunei)	1–3	(Singapore) Home United	Hassanal Bolkiah National Stadium
20:15 UTC+8	Rafael Ramazotti 59'; Wardun Yussof (yellow card) 65'; Yura Indera Putera (yellow card) 66'	Report	Stipe Plazibat (penalty scored) 9',37' (yellow card) 80'; Faris Ramli 76'; Sirina Camara (yellow card) 55'; Song Ui-young (yellow card) 90'	Attendance: 2,729; Referee: Farhad Mohd

9 March 2017 Round 2	Albirex Niigata (S) (Singapore)	2–0	(Brunei) DPMM FC	Jurong East Stadium
19:30 UTC+8	Ryuya Motoda 75'; Ryota Nakai 87'	Report	Yura Indera Putera (yellow card) 30'	Attendance: 1,413; Referee: W Ravisanthiran

2 April 2017 Round 3	DPMM FC (Brunei)	2–0	(Singapore) Hougang United	Hassanal Bolkiah National Stadium
20:15 UTC+8	Billy Mehmet 9' (yellow card) 70'; Hendra Azam 45'; Željko Savić (yellow card) 59'; Azwan Saleh (yellow card) 62'	Report	Ali Hudzaifi (yellow card) 23'; Azhar Sairudin (yellow card) 30'; Pablo Rodríguez (yellow card) 59'; Afiq Noor (yellow card) 68'	Referee: Nathan Chan

7 April 2017 Round 4	Balestier Khalsa (Singapore)	2–1	(Brunei) DPMM FC	Jalan Besar Stadium
	Hazzuwan Halim 56'; Raihan Rahman 60'; Ashrul Syafeeq (yellow card) 20'; Aung Kyaw Naing (yellow card) 45'; Ahmad Syahir (yellow card) 82'; Zaiful Nizam (yellow card) 90'	Report	Rafael Ramazotti 21' (pen.); Azwan Saleh (yellow card) 45,86' (yellow-red card)	Attendance: 788; Referee: Ahmad A'Qashah

15 April 2017 Round 5	DPMM FC (Brunei)	3–5	(Singapore) Warriors FC	Hassanal Bolkiah National Stadium
20:15 UTC+8	Rafael Ramazotti 45', 84' (yellow card) 74'; Billy Mehmet 62'; Najib Tarif (yellow card) 51'; Awangku Fakharazzi (yellow card) 70'	Report	Jordan Webb 25', 56'; Kento Fukuda 73'; Ridhuan Muhammad 82'; Joël Tshibamba 87'; Ho Wai Loon (yellow card) 48'; Emmeric Ong (yellow card) 54'	Referee: Jansen Foo

20 April 2017 Round 6	Geylang International (Singapore)	2–0	(Brunei) DPMM FC	Bedok Stadium
	Shafiq Ghani 18'; Víctor Coto Ortega 52' (pen.); Al-Qaasimy Rahman (yellow card) 56'; Shawal Anuar (yellow card) 90'	Report	Nurikhwan Othman (yellow card) 8'; Billy Mehmet (yellow card) 39'; Azwan Ali (yellow card) 65'	Attendance: 1,666; Referee: Farhad Mohamed

28 April 2017 Round 7	DPMM FC (Brunei)	0–1	(Singapore) Tampines Rovers	Hassanal Bolkiah National Stadium
	Maududi Hilmi Kasmi (yellow card) 39'; Yura Indera Putera Yunos (yellow card) 56'; Helmi Zambin (yellow card) 71'	Report	Ivan Džoni 3'	Referee: Muhd Taqi

13 May 2017 Round 8	Young Lions FC (Singapore)	0–0	(Brunei) DPMM FC	Jalan Besar Stadium
	Taufik Suparno (yellow card) 90'		Rosmin Kamis (yellow card) 49'; Yura Indera Putera (yellow card) 85'	Attendance: 1,371; Referee: Sukhbir Singh

25 May 2017 Round 9	Home United (Singapore)	9–3	(Brunei) DPMM FC	Bishan Stadium
	Faris Ramli 21' 30' 45' 59'; Stipe Plazibat 33' 36'; Khairul Nizam 41'; Adam Swandi 49'; Song Ui-young 56'; Izzdin Shafiq (yellow card) 90'		Rafael Ramazotti 50'; Shahrazen Said 64'; Adi Said 64' 82'	Attendance: 1,801; Referee: W Ravisanthiran

16 June 2017 Round 10	Albirex Niigata (S) (Singapore)	4–0	(Brunei) DPMM FC	Jurong East Stadium
	Tsubasa Sano 9'; Ryota Nakai 34'; Rui Kumada 50'; Naofumi Tanaka 86'		Haizul Rani Metusin (yellow card) 20'; Vincent Reyes (yellow card) 45'	Attendance: 1,024; Referee: Farhad Mohd

23 September 2017 Round 11 (Rescheduled)	Hougang United (Singapore)	1–2	(Brunei) DPMM FC	Hougang Stadium
	Azhar Sairudin 85'; Gareth Low (yellow card) 29'; Lionel Tan (yellow card) 90'		Adi Said 29'; Daúd Gazale 77'; Vincent Reyes (yellow card) 61'	Referee: Sukhbir Singh

21 August 2017 Round 12 (Rescheduled)	Balestier Khalsa (Singapore)	2–2	(Brunei) DPMM FC	Toa Payoh Stadium
	Huzaifah Aziz 7' (yellow card) 86'; Raihan Rahman 60'; Fadli Kamis (yellow card) 22'; Sheikh Abdul Hadi (yellow card) 49'; Jonathan Tan (yellow card) 75'		Rafael Ramazotti 70', 82'; Hazwan Hamzah (yellow card) 21'; Haizul Rani Metusin (yellow card) 58'	Attendance: 805; Referee: Farhad Mohamed

2 July 2017 Round 13	Warriors FC (Singapore)	1–0	(Brunei) DPMM FC	Choa Chu Kang Stadium
	Ridhuan Muhamad 54'; Andrei Ciolacu (penalty missed) 28; Zulfadli Zainal Abidin (yellow card) 41'; Firdaus Kasman (yellow card) 71'		Azwan Ali (yellow card) 31'; Vincent Salas (yellow card) 85'; Najib Tarif (red card) 90'	Referee: Ahmad A'Qashah

24 July 2017 Round 14	DPMM FC (Brunei)	0–1	(Singapore) Geylang International	Hassanal Bolkiah National Stadium
	Daúd Gazale (penalty missed) 62; Hazwan Hamzah (yellow card) 67'; Khairul Anwar (yellow card) 90'		Shafiq Ghani 81'; Nor Azli (yellow card) 43'; Faritz Abdul Hameed (yellow card) 76'	Attendance: 1,026; Referee: W Ravisanthiran

28 July 2017 Round 15	Tampines Rovers (Singapore)	2–0	(Brunei) DPMM FC	Tampines Hub
	Shakir Hamzah 28'; Shahdan Sulaiman 83' (pen.); Fazrul Nawaz (yellow card) 79'		Hazwan Hamzah (yellow card) 53'; Vincent Reyes (yellow card) 85'	Attendance: 4,676; Referee: Muhd Syahir

8 September 2017 Round 16	DPMM FC (Brunei)	1–4	(Singapore) Home United	Hassanal Bolkiah National Stadium
20:15 UTC+8	Ramazotti 30'	Report	Faris 15', 38'; Plazibat 19' (pen.); Nizam 78'	Attendance: 592; Referee: Nathan Chan

16 September 2017 Round 17	DPMM FC (Brunei)	0–1	(Singapore) Albirex Niigata (S)	Hassanal Bolkiah National Stadium
	Rafael Ramazotti (yellow card) 42'; Adi Said (yellow card) 43'; Helmi Zambin (yellow card) 52'; Azwan Ali (yellow card) 56'		Naofumi Tanaka 26'; Rui Kumada (yellow card) 50'; Takuya Akiyama (yellow card) 53'	Attendance: 781; Referee: G Letchman

19 September 2017 Round 18	DPMM FC (Brunei)	1–4	(Singapore) Hougang United	Hassanal Bolkiah National Stadium
	Rafael Ramazotti 74'; Azwan Ali (yellow card) 34'; Nurikhwan Othman (yellow card) 38'		Fumiya Kogure 8' (pen.) 27' (pen.) 84'; Iqbal Hussain 76'; Lionel Tan (yellow card) 5'; Antoine Viterale (red card) 80'	Attendance: 778; Referee: Farhad Mohamed

7 October 2017 Round 19	DPMM FC (Brunei)	7–1	(Singapore) Young Lions	Hassanal Bolkiah National Stadium
	Rafael Ramazotti 45', 50', 54'; Adi Said 53', 69', 80'; Daud Gazale 64'; Vincent Reyes (yellow card) 34'; Rosmin Kamis (yellow card) 41'; Hendra Azam (yellow card) 76'; Haizul Rani (yellow card) 77'		Armin Maier 78'; Shahrin Saberin (yellow card) 42'; Hami Syahin (yellow card) 76'; Hafiz Sulaiman (yellow card) 90'	Attendance: 499; Referee: Ahmad A'Qashah

16 October 2017 Round 20 (Rescheduled)	DPMM FC (Brunei)	1–4	(Singapore) Balestier Khalsa	Hassanal Bolkiah National Stadium
	Shahrazen Said 90'; Daud Jared Alvarez (yellow card) 58'		Fadli Kamis 21'; Hazzuwan Halim 48' 72' (pen.) (yellow card) 69'; Tajeli Salamat 88'; Nanda Linn Kyaw Chit (yellow card) 62'	Referee: Sukhbir Singh

21 October 2017 Round 21	DPMM FC (Brunei)	3–2	(Singapore) Warriors FC	Hassanal Bolkiah National Stadium
	Azwan Ali Rahman 35', 65'; Rafael Ramazotti 48'; Rosmin Kamis (yellow card) 29'; Azwan Saleh (yellow card) 76'; Hendra Azam (yellow card) 80'		Jordan Webb 24'; Shahril Ishak 81'; Baihakki Khaizan (yellow card) 66'; Fazli Jaffar (yellow card) 69'; Firdaus Kasman (yellow card) 88'	Referee: Jansen Foo

27 October 2017 Round 22	Geylang International (Singapore)	4–1	(Brunei) DPMM FC	Jalan Besar Stadium
	Shawal Anuar 8', 82'; Ricardo Sendra 20'; Víctor Coto Ortega 22'; Shahfiq Ghani (yellow card) 36'; Safirul Sulaiman (yellow card) 85'		Azwan Ali Rahman 51'; Vincent Reyes (yellow card) 40'; Rosmin Kamis (yellow card) 86'	Referee: Muhd Taqi

3 November 2017 Round 23	DPMM FC (Brunei)	0–5	(Singapore) Tampines Rovers	Hassanal Bolkiah National Stadium
			Shahdan Sulaiman 21'; Hazwan Hamzah 36' (o.g.); Khairul Amri 45', 66'; Ivan Dzoni 80'; Fazli Ayob (yellow card) 47'	Referee: Muhd Syahir

18 November 2017 Round 24	Young Lions FC (Singapore)	1–2	(Brunei) DPMM FC	Jalan Besar Stadium
	Yeo Hai Ngee 22' (pen.); Hami Syahin (yellow card) 81'		Azwan Ali 5'; Rafael Ramazotti 24'; Rosmin Kamis (yellow card) 45'; Yura Indera Putera (yellow card) 48'; Hazwan Hamzah (yellow card) 72'; Abdul Mu'iz Sisa (yellow card) 87'	Referee: Farhad Mohamed

Pos	Team	Pld	W	D	L	GF	GA	GD	Pts
5	Warriors FC	24	9	7	8	33	36	−3	34
6	Hougang United	24	9	3	12	24	31	−7	30
7	Balestier Khalsa	24	5	4	15	17	33	−16	19
8	(Brunei) DPMM FC (Note: The two foreign clubs – Albirex Niigata (S) and DPMM FC – as well as the Football Association of Singapore (FAS) under-21 team, Young Lions, are not eligible for any AFC competition spots.)	24	5	2	17	30	61	−31	17
9	(Singapore) Young Lions	24	1	3	20	10	62	−52	6

Source: S.League
Rules for classification: 1) points; 2) goal difference; 3) number of goals scored; 4) number of wins

=== Singapore Cup ===
Win Draw Loss

13 August 2017 Quarter Final Leg 1	DPMM FC (Brunei)	1–3	(Singapore) Home United	Jalan Besar Stadium
	Rafael Ramazotti 60'; Hanif Hamir (yellow card) 24'		Juma'at Jantan 69'; Faris Ramli 72', 84'; Christopher Van Huizen (yellow card) 36'	Referee: Sukhbir Singh

16 August 2017 Quarter Final Leg 2	Home United (Singapore)	3–1	(Brunei) DPMM FC	Bishan Stadium
	Faris Ramli 64'; Iqram Rifqi 86'; Juma'at Jantan 90'		Helmi Zambin 48'	Referee: Nathan Chan

Home United won 6-2 on aggregate.

=== Singapore TNP League Cup ===
Pos	Team	Pld	W	D	L	GF	GA	GD	Pts	Qualification
1	(Brunei) DPMM FC	3	2	1	0	11	4	+7	7	Advance to semi-final
2	Geylang International	3	2	1	0	9	4	+5	7	Advance to semi-final
3	Balestier Khalsa	3	1	0	2	3	5	−2	3	
4	Tampines Rovers	3	0	0	3	2	12	−10	0	

Source: S.League

Win Draw Loss

==== Group stage ====
8 July 2017 Group Stage M1	Tampines Rovers (Singapore)	1–5	(Brunei) DPMM FC	Jalan Besar Stadium
	Jamil Ali 67'; Syed Haziq (yellow card) 70'; Fazli Ayob (yellow card) 73'		Adi Said 14'; Hafiz 31' (o.g.); Maududi Hilmi Kasmi 41'; Azwan Ali 41'; Shahrazen Said 48' (yellow card) 12'; Najib Tarif (yellow card) 87'	Referee: Jansen Foo

11 July 2017 Group Stage M2	DPMM FC (Brunei)	3–0	(Singapore) Balestier Khalsa	Jalan Besar Stadium
	Azwan Ali 7'; Ashrul Syafeeq 42' (o.g.); Adi Said 70'; Nurikhwan Othman (yellow card) 30'; Vincent Salas (yellow card) 36'; Azwan Saleh (yellow card) 63'		Huzaifah Aziz (yellow card) 5'; Fadli Kamis (yellow card) 82'	Referee: G Letchman

14 July 2017 Group Stage M3	DPMM FC (Brunei)	3–3	(Singapore) Geylang International	Jalan Besar Stadium
	Adi Said 20'; Maududi Hilmi Kasmi 69'; Helmi Zambin 84'; Hanif Hamir (yellow card) 32'; Nurikhwan Othman (yellow card) 60'; Hazwan Hamzah (yellow card) 67'		Víctor Coto Ortega 23'; Ricardo Sendra 48'; Taufiq Ghani 68' (pen.)	Referee: Farhad Mohd

==== Knockout stage ====
18 July 2017 Semi-final	DPMM FC (Brunei)	1–5	(Singapore) Warriors FC	Jalan Besar Stadium
	Vincent Salas (yellow card) 38'; Maududi Hilmi Kasmi (yellow card) 52'; Shahrazen Said 77'	Report	Emmeric Ong 26'; Shahril Ishak 26', 44', 70' (pen.); Emmeric Ong (yellow card) 26'; Andrei Ciolacu 53'	Referee: Farhad Mohd
