= 2020 DPMM FC season =

20th season in existence of DPMM FC

DPMM FC
2020 season
- Chairman: HRH Prince Al-Muhtadee Billah
- Head coach: (England) Adrian Pennock
- Stadium: Hassanal Bolkiah National Stadium
Home colours	Away colours

The 2020 season will be DPMM FC's 9th consecutive season in the top flight of Singaporean football, the Singapore Premier League. Along with the SGPL, the club will also compete in the Singapore Cup. They are the defending champions for the new season.

The club will also enter a domestic team to compete in the 2020 Brunei Super League.

Current club captain and stalwart Wardun Yussof has announced before the start of the campaign that this will be his last season as a professional footballer.

PitchBN will be their new sponsor for 2021.

== Squad ==
=== Singapore Premier League squad ===
No.	Name	Nationality	Date of birth (age)	Previous club	Contract Start	Contract end
Goalkeepers
1	Emerson José da Conceição	(Brazil)	3 August 1982 (age 44)	(Brazil) Londrina Esporte Clube	2020	2020
24	Azriel Arman	(Brunei)	27 March 1995 (age 31)	(Brunei) MS ABDB	2020	2020
25	Wardun Yussof	(Brunei)	14 September 1981 (age 45)	(Brunei) Majra FC	2006	2020
Defenders
2	Wafi Aminuddin ^{U23}	(Brunei)	20 September 2000 (age 25)	(Brunei) Tabuan Muda	2019	2020
3	Abdul Mu'iz Sisa	(Brunei)	20 April 1991 (age 35)	(Brunei) Indera SC	2016	2020
5	Charlie Clough	(England)	4 September 1990 (age 36)	(England) Sutton United	2019	2020
6	Azwan Saleh	(Brunei)	1 June 1988 (age 38)	(Brunei) Indera SC	2006	2020
13	Suhaimi Anak Sulau	(Brunei)	3 March 1996 (age 30)	(Brunei) Indera SC	2018	2020
14	Helmi Zambin	(Brunei)	30 March 1987 (age 39)	(Brunei) Indera SC	2009	2020
15	Hazwan Hamzah	(Brunei)	9 September 1991 (age 35)	(Brunei) Indera SC	2019	2020
21	Abdul Aziz Tamit	(Brunei)	7 September 1989 (age 37)	(Brunei) Kasuka FC	2018	2020
23	Yura Indera Putera Yunos	(Brunei)	25 March 1996 (age 30)	(Brunei) Majra FC	2015	2020
Midfielders
4	Hanif Farhan Azman ^{U23}	(Brunei)	2 November 2000 (age 25)	Youth	2020	2020
7	Azwan Ali Rahman	(Brunei)	11 January 1992 (age 34)	(Brunei) Indera SC	2013	2020
8	Hendra Azam Idris	(Brunei)	10 August 1988 (age 38)	(Brunei) QAF FC	2012	2020
11	Najib Tarif	(Brunei)	5 February 1988 (age 38)	(Brunei) Indera SC	2012	2020
19	Nur Ikhwan Othman	(Brunei)	15 January 1993 (age 33)	(Brunei) Indera SC	2016	2020
Strikers
9	Abdul Azizi Ali Rahman	(Brunei)	17 January 1987 (age 39)	(Brunei) MS ABDB	2018	2020
10	Andrey Varankow	(Belarus)	8 February 1989 (age 37)	(Belarus) FC Gorodeya	2019	2020
17	Hakeme Yazid Said ^{U23}	(Brunei)	8 February 2003 (age 23)	Youth	2019	2020
18	Razimie Ramlli	(Brunei)	6 August 1990 (age 36)	(Brunei) MS ABDB	2019	2020
22	Shah Razen Said	(Brunei)	14 December 1985 (age 40)	(Brunei) Wijaya FC	2005	2020
Players who left during season

=== Brunei Super League squad ===
No.	Name	Nationality	Date of birth (age)	Previous club	Contract Start	Contract end
Goalkeepers
18	Mu'izzuddin Ismail	(Brunei)	10 February 1987 (age 39)	(Brunei) MS PDB	2020	2020
Defenders
3	Shuhei Sasahara	(Japan)	22 November 1996 (age 29)	(Japan) Albirex Niigata (S)	2020	2020
4	Nazif Safwan Jaini	(Brunei)	18 August 2000 (age 26)	(Brunei) Tabuan Muda	2019	2020
5	Rahimin Abdul Ghani	(Brunei)	31 May 1999 (age 27)	(Brunei) Tabuan Muda	2019	2020
15	Fakharrazi Hassan	(Brunei)	15 July 1989 (age 37)	(Brunei) MS ABDB	2018	2020
22	Salleh Emzah	(Brunei)	23 May 2001 (age 25)	(Brunei) Tabuan Muda	2019	2020
32	Aisan Aisamuddin Abdullah Aiman	(Brunei)	2 February 2002 (age 24)	(Brunei) Tabuan Muda	2020	2020
Midfielders
7	Hardi Bujang	(Brunei)	19 October 1984 (age 41)	(Brunei) Kota Ranger FC	2020	2020
8	Haziq Kasyful Azim	(Brunei)	24 December 1998 (age 27)	(Brunei) Menglait FC	2019	2020
16	Afif Hadi Roshidi	(Brunei)	4 March 1998 (age 28)	(Brunei) Tabuan Muda	2019	2020
17	Shafie Effendy	(Brunei)	4 August 1995 (age 31)	(Brunei) MS ABDB	2020	2020
30	Imam Mahdi Suhaimi	(Brunei)	9 July 2002 (age 24)	(Brunei) Tabuan Muda	2019	2020
Strikers
10	Abdul Salam	(Ghana)		(Tajikistan) FC Dushanbe-83	2020	2020
11	Abdul Azim Abdul Rasid	(Brunei)	24 April 1996 (age 30)	(Brunei) MS PDB	2020	2020
29	Shafiq Hidayat	(Brunei)		(Brunei) Rainbow FC	2020	2020
Players who left during season
10	Choi Ji-ho	(South Korea)		(Hong Kong) Hoi King SA	2020	2020

== Coaching staff ==
Position	Name	Ref.
Head Coach	(England) Adrian Pennock	
Assistant Coach	(Brunei) Moksen Mohammad	
Goalkeeping Coach	(Brazil) Jorge Barbosa Ferreira	
Fitness Coach	(England) Jason Moriarty	
Team Manager	(Brunei) Mohammad Ali bin Hj Momin	
Physiotherapist	(Brunei) Faisal Hashim & Masri Tahir	
Kitman	(Brunei) Kasim Amit	

== Transfers ==
=== Pre-Season transfers ===
==== In ====
Position	Player	Transferred from	Ref
GK	(Brunei) Azriel Arman	(Brunei) MS ABDB	
GK	(Brazil) Emerson	(Brazil) Londrina Esporte Clube	
MF	(Brunei) Hanif Farhan Azman	Promoted from youth team	

==== Out ====
Position	Player	Transferred To	Ref
GK	(Brunei) Haimie Anak Nyaring	(Brunei) MS PDB	
GK	(Brunei) Ishyra Asmin Jabidi		
DF	(Brunei) Fakharrazi Hassan	(Brunei) DPMM FC II	
DF	(Brunei) Hanif Hamir		
MF	(Brunei) Azim Izamuddin Suhaimi	(Brunei) Kota Ranger	
MF	(Australia) Blake Ricciuto	(Spain) Velez CF (Tier 4)	
FW	(Brunei) Adi Said	(Brunei) Kota Ranger	

==== Extension / Retained ====
Position	Player	Ref
DF	(England) Charlie Clough	1 years contract signed in Nov 2019
FW	(Belarus) Andrey Varankow	1 years contract signed in Nov 2019

==== Trial ====
Position	Player	Club	Ref
GK	(Brunei) Mu'izzuddin Ismail	(Brunei) MS PDB	
MF	(England) (Guyana) Keanu Marsh-Brown	(England) Newport County A.F.C. (Tier 4)	
FW	(Brunei) Hariz Danial Khallidden	(Brunei) MS ABDB	

=== Mid-season transfer ===
==== In ====
Position	Player	Transferred from	Ref

==== Out ====
Position	Player	Transferred from	Ref

== Friendly ==
Win Draw Loss

=== Tour of Cambodia ===
2 February 2020 Pre-Season Friendly	Visakha FC (Cambodia)	1–2	(Brunei) DPMM FC	Phnom Penh, Cambodia
18:00 (UTC+7)	Mihaljević 3'	Report	Azwan Saleh 48'; Azizi 81'	Stadium: Prince Stadium, Phnom Penh

4 February 2020 Pre-Season Friendly	PKR Svay Rieng (Cambodia)	5–1	(Brunei) DPMM FC	Phnom Penh, Cambodia
15:30 (UTC+7)	Mbarga 10', 53'; Nurikhwan 32' (o.g.); Hoy 56'; Nub 66'		Varankou 7' (pen.)	Stadium: Phnom Penh Olympic Stadium, Phnom Penh

== Team statistics ==
=== Appearances and goals ===
As of 7 August 2019

No.	Pos.	Player	SGPL		Singapore Cup		Total	
No.	Pos.	Player	Apps.	Goals	Apps.	Goals	Apps.	Goals
1	GK	(Brazil) Emerson	1	0	0	0	1	0
2	DF	(Brunei) Wafi Aminuddin	0	0	0	0	0	0
3	DF	(Brunei) Abdul Mu'iz Sisa	0	0	0	0	0	0
4	MF	(Brunei) Hanif Farhan Azman	1	0	0	0	1	0
5	DF	(England) Charlie Clough	1	1	0	0	1	1
6	MF	(Brunei) Azwan Saleh	0	0	0	0	0	0
7	MF	(Brunei) Azwan Ali Rahman	1	0	0	0	1	0
8	MF	(Brunei) Hendra Azam Idris	1	0	0	0	1	0
9	FW	(Brunei) Abdul Azizi Ali Rahman	1	0	0	0	1	0
10	FW	(Belarus) Andrey Varankow	1	1	0	0	1	1
11	MF	(Brunei) Najib Tarif	1	0	0	0	1	0
13	DF	(Brunei) Suhaimi Anak Sulau	0+1	0	0	0	1	0
14	DF	(Brunei) Helmi Zambin	1	0	0	0	1	0
15	DF	(Brunei) Hazwan Hamzah	0	0	0	0	0	0
17	FW	(Brunei) Hakeme Yazid Said	0	0	0	0	0	0
18	FW	(Brunei) Razimie Ramlli	0+1	0	0	0	1	0
19	MF	(Brunei) Nur Ikhwan Othman	1	0	0	0	1	0
21	DF	(Brunei) Abdul Aziz Tamit	0+1	0	0	0	1	0
22	FW	(Brunei) Shah Razen Said	0	0	0	0	0	0
23	DF	(Brunei) Yura Indera Putera Yunos	1	0	0	0	1	0
24	GK	(Brunei) Azriel Arman	0	0	0	0	0	0
25	GK	(Brunei) Wardun Yussof	0	0	0	0	0	0
Players who have played this season but had left the club or on loan to other club

== Competitions ==
=== Overview ===
Competition	Record							
Competition	P	W	D	L	GF	GA	GD	Win %

=== Singapore Premier League ===
Win Draw Loss

6 March 2020 1	Brunei DPMM	2–0	(Singapore) Tampines Rovers	Hassanal Bolkiah National Stadium
	Clough 23'; Varankou 85'; Nurikhwan (yellow card) 49'; Azwan Ali (yellow card) 69'; Suhaimi (yellow card) 72'	Report	Taufik (red card) 90+1'; Mehmedović (yellow card) 90+5'	Referee: G.Letchman; Man of the Match: (Belarus) Andrey Varankow

2 (Rescheduled) (Note: The match is postponed following the coronavirus pandemic.)	Hougang United (Singapore)	v	Brunei DPMM	Hougang Stadium

28 October 2020 3 (Rescheduled)	Lion City Sailors (Singapore)	v	Brunei DPMM	Bishan Stadium

31 October 2020 4 (Rescheduled)	Brunei DPMM	v	(Singapore) Geylang International	Hassanal Bolkiah National Stadium

4 November 2020 5 (Rescheduled)	Albirex Niigata (S) (Singapore)	v	Brunei DPMM	Jurong East Stadium

7 November 2020 6 (Rescheduled)	Balestier Khalsa (Singapore)	v	Brunei DPMM	Bishan Stadium

11 November 2020 7 (Rescheduled)	Brunei DPMM	v	(Singapore) Tanjong Pagar United	Hassanal Bolkiah National Stadium

15 November 2020 8 (Rescheduled)	Brunei DPMM	v	(Singapore) Lion City Sailors	Hassanal Bolkiah National Stadium

21 November 2020 9 (Rescheduled)	Tampines Rovers (Singapore)	v	Brunei DPMM	Our Tampines Hub

25 November 2020 10 (Rescheduled)	Brunei DPMM	v	(Singapore) Albirex Niigata (S)	Hassanal Bolkiah National Stadium

29 November 2020 11 (Rescheduled)	Young Lions FC (Singapore)	v	Brunei DPMM	Jurong West Stadium

2 December 2020 12 (Rescheduled)	Brunei DPMM	v	(Singapore) Young Lions FC	Hassanal Bolkiah National Stadium

5 December 2020 13 (Rescheduled)	Brunei DPMM	v	(Singapore) Hougang United	Hassanal Bolkiah National Stadium

9 December 2020 14 (Rescheduled)	Geylang International (Singapore)	v	Brunei DPMM	Our Tampines Hub

12 December 2020 15 (Rescheduled)	Brunei DPMM	v	(Singapore) Balestier Khalsa	Hassanal Bolkiah National Stadium

19 December 2020 16 (Rescheduled)	Tanjong Pagar United (Singapore)	v	Brunei DPMM	Jurong East Stadium

=== Singapore Cup ===
Win Draw Loss

== See also ==
- 2017 DPMM FC season
- 2018 DPMM FC season
- 2019 DPMM FC season
