= Fakharrazi Hassan =

Bruneian footballer (born 1989)

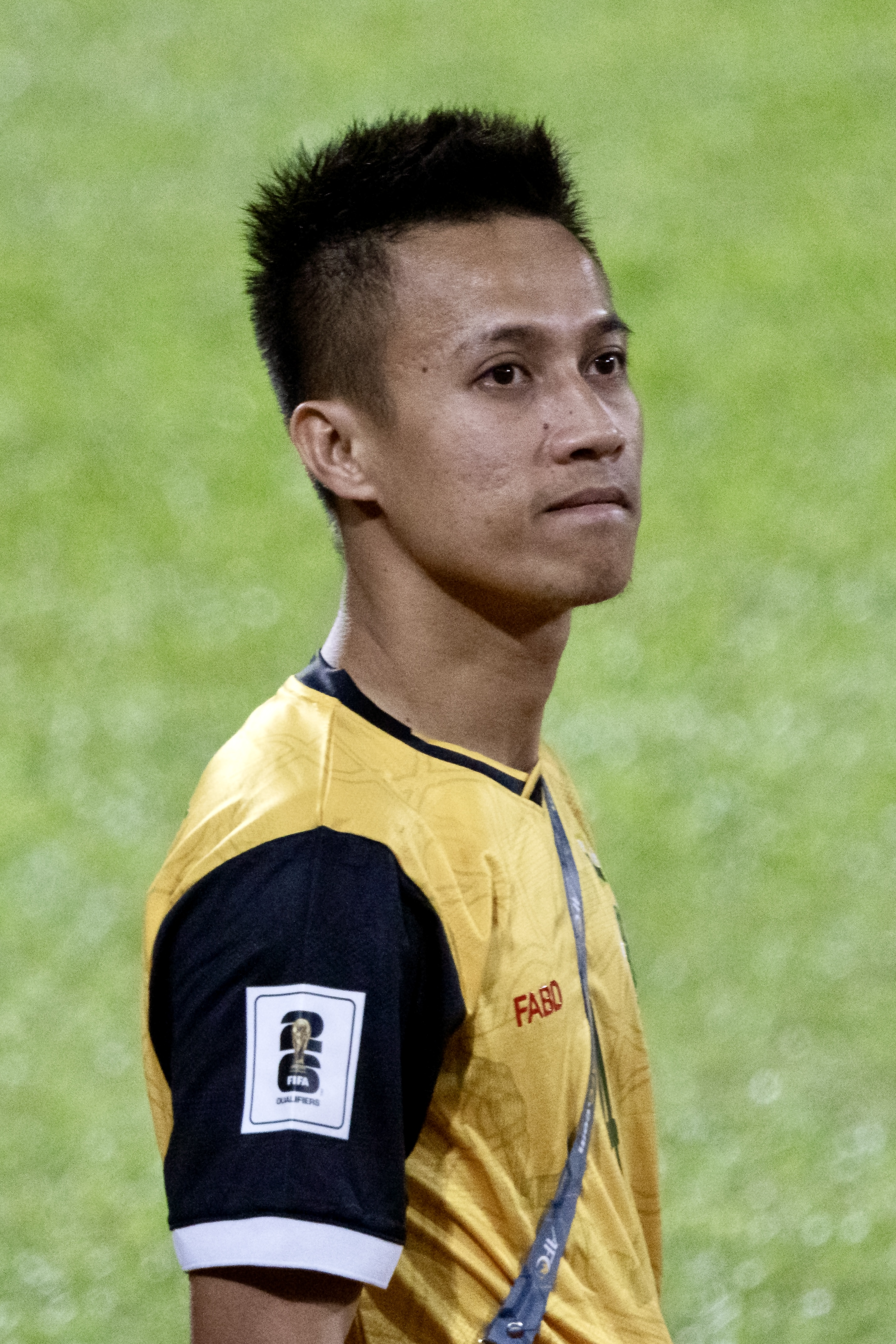
- Fakharrazi with Brunei in 2023

Personal information
- Full name: Pengiran Mohammad Fakharrazi bin Pengiran Haji Hassan
- Date of birth: 15 July 1989 (age 37)
- Place of birth: Brunei
- Height: 1.67 m (5 ft 6 in)
- Positions: Midfielder; right back

Youth career
- IKLS FC

Senior career*
Years	Team	Apps	(Gls)
2008–2010	AM Gunners		
2010–2012	MS ABDB		
2011–2012	→ DPMM (loan)	9	(0)
2012–2017	DPMM	30	(3)
2017	MS ABDB	16	(1)
2018–2019	DPMM	14	(1)
2020	DPMM II	2	(0)
2021–2024	DPMM	26	(1)

International career^{‡}
2011	Brunei U23	5	(0)
2011–2024	Brunei	24	(2)
- * Club domestic league appearances and goals as of 1 September 2024 ‡ National team caps and goals as of 1 October 2024

Pengiran Mohammad Fakharrazi bin Pengiran Haji Hassan (born 15 July 1989), sometimes erroneously referred to as Ak Fakharazzi, is a Bruneian retired footballer who played as a right-sided defender or midfielder.

== Club career ==
Fakharrazi was a youth player at IKLS FC, a club that was based in Kampong Ayer. He moved to Prince Mateen owned club AM Gunners who were chasing promotion to the Brunei Premier League I in 2008, and played there for the next 2 years. He was registered to MS ABDB in 2010, but was soon snapped up by DPMM FC who were preparing to return to the S.League in 2012. He made his debut in a 1–3 away victory over Balestier Khalsa on 10 May. He made nine substitute appearances in his first season as DPMM won the 2009 Singapore League Cup and placed second in the league.

For the next couple of seasons, Fakharrazi made a handful of appearances without cementing a regular place in the team due to the form of Aminuddin Zakwan Tahir and later Helmi Zambin in his preferred right-back spot. Midway through a disastrous campaign in 2017, he swapped teams with Haizul Rani Metusin and returned to MS ABDB where he won the domestic league title, making 16 appearances for the armymen and scoring once.

Fakharrazi returned to the fold with DPMM in 2018 under the reign of Rene Weber. The following year, he made 10 league starts under Adrian Pennock, scoring the decisive fifth goal against Hougang United in a 5–4 victory at home on 29 September, which helped DPMM clinch the Singapore Premier League title. Despite his heroics, he was reassigned to the B team playing in the Brunei Super League in the short-lived 2020 season for DPMM. The following year, he was reinstated into the first team, scoring in a 15–0 victory over Rimba Star FC on 4 July.

On 4 December 2022, Fakharrazi gained his first Brunei FA Cup medal after DPMM won 2–1 against Kasuka FC in the final of the 2022 Brunei FA Cup. The club announced his release on 7 February 2024.

== International career ==
Fakharrazi was a squad member for the 2011 edition of the SEA Games football tournament with the Brunei under-23s.

Fakharrazi featured for the Wasps at the 2012 AFF Suzuki Cup qualifying round in the final fixture against Timor-Leste, in a 2–1 victory on 13 October which also eliminated the Timorese from qualifying for the tournament. Two years later he was ever-present at right midfield under Steve Kean at the 2014 AFF Suzuki Cup qualification, scoring twice in as many games against Timor-Leste and hosts Laos. Despite his goals, Brunei finished bottom of their group without earning a point, a marked decline from the previous campaign.

Entering the FIFA World Cup for the first time in 12 years, Fakharrazi was selected for the 2018 World Cup qualification first round matches against Chinese Taipei in March 2015. He started both games when after providing the cross for Adi Said's goal in a promising 0–1 victory in Kaohsiung, he was taken off injured early in the second leg, and subsequently his team faltered to a 0–2 reverse which eliminated them from the World Cup in Russia.

Fakharrazi's next international tournament was the 2016 AFF Championship qualification matches held in Cambodia that October. He started the first match in a 2–1 victory over Timor-Leste, but was also on the field in a 0–3 defeat to the hosts. A month later, he also made two appearances from the starting lineup at the 2016 AFC Solidarity Cup held in Kuching, Malaysia.

After barely getting any playing time for his club in 2018, his resurgence under Adrian Pennock earned him a callup for the 2022 World Cup qualification matches against Mongolia in June 2019, but he declined due to unspecified reasons. He made appearances from the start at friendly games against Laos, Malaysia and the Maldives in 2022.

In November 2022, Fakharazzi played the first match against Timor-Leste at the 2022 AFF Mitsubishi Electric Cup qualifying matches held in Bandar Seri Begawan. The Wasps won the match 6–2 which greatly helped the team to qualify for the tournament proper. The following month, Fakharrazi made three out of four appearances for Brunei, registering losses in all of them.

In October 2023, Fakharrazi was called up for the 2026 World Cup qualification matches against Indonesia. He made two substitute appearances in a 0–12 aggregate defeat for the Wasps.

=== International goals ===
Scores and results list Brunei goal tally first.

Goal	Date	Venue	Opponent	Score	Result	Competition
1.	12 October 2014	Vientiane, Laos	Timor-Leste	2–1	2–4	2014 AFF Suzuki Cup qualification
2.	14 October 2014	Vientiane, Laos	Laos	1–2	2–4	2014 AFF Suzuki Cup qualification

== Honours ==
=== Team ===
AM Gunners

- Brunei Premier League II: 2008

Brunei DPMM FC

- S.League: 2012 Runner-Up, 2014 Runner-Up, 2015
- Singapore Premier League: 2019
- Singapore League Cup (2): 2012, 2014
- Brunei FA Cup: 2022

MS ABDB

- Brunei Super League: 2017–18

== Personal life ==
Fakharrazi had a brother named Abdul Halim who was a footballer with Kasuka FC and previously won the 2012 Hassanal Bolkiah Trophy with Brunei U21, who died at the age of 30 on 24 August 2023.
