= Najib Tarif =

Bruneian footballer

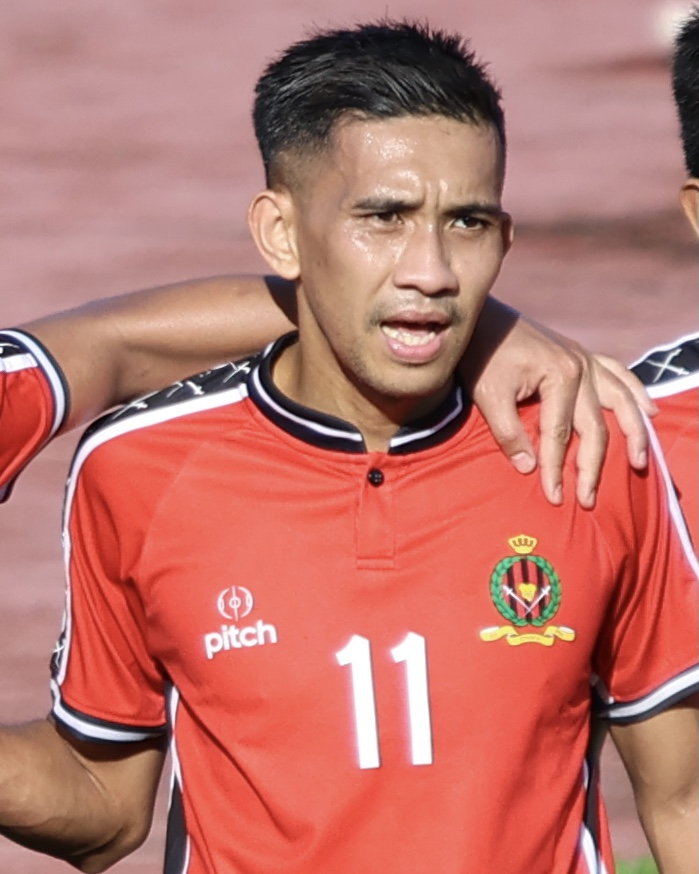
- Najib with DPMM in 2022

Personal information
- Full name: Mohamad Najib bin Haji Tarif
- Date of birth: 5 February 1988 (age 38)
- Place of birth: Bandar Seri Begawan, Brunei
- Height: 1.70 m (5 ft 7 in)
- Positions: Midfielder; defender

Senior career*
Years	Team	Apps	(Gls)
2007–2008	NBT		
2008–2010	AM Gunners		
2011–2012	MS PDB		
2012–2026	DPMM	149	(1)

International career
2005–2014	Brunei U21		
2011	Brunei U23	5	(1)
2008–2024	Brunei	30	(1)
- * Club domestic league appearances and goals

Lance Corporal Mohamad Najib bin Haji Tarif (born 5 February 1988) is a Bruneian former footballer who played as a midfielder or defender.

== Club career ==
Starting out with the likes of NBT FC and AM Gunners of the Brunei Premier League, Najib's performances at the 2012 Hassanal Bolkiah Trophy as team captain prompted a move from MS PDB to royalty-owned club DPMM FC who were playing in the S.League.

After appearing only seven times in the 2015 season, Najib's club head coach Steve Kean advised him to switch to the left-back position for him to gain playing time (as he has done to Helmi Zambin and Aminuddin Zakwan Tahir). A season-ending injury to first-choice Sairol Sahari meant that he would be relied on much more heavily in 2016.

Najib became the starting left-back for DPMM's 2017 campaign which ended in a disappointing 8th place, leading to the dismissal of coach Steve Kean. He was back on the sidelines with the arrival of Suhaimi Anak Sulau in the following season.

Najib regained his place at the start of the 2019 campaign under Adrian Pennock. He was rotated with Abdul Mu'iz Sisa for the position on the left of Pennock's 3-5-2 formation, becoming the starter towards the second half of the season. He became Singapore Premier League champion with DPMM by September of that year.

Despite playing in the occasional advanced left-sided role for DPMM, Najib's first league goal for the club did not come until 4 July 2021 when he scored one of the 15 unanswered goals against Rimba Star FC in the Brunei Super League.

In 2022, DPMM competed domestically at the 2022 Brunei FA Cup, managing to advance to the final of the competition with Najib appearing regularly at the left side of the lineup. On 4 December, DPMM overcame Kasuka FC 2–1 in the final, handing them their second ever Brunei FA Cup trophy.

After 14 years of playing for DPMM, it was announced by the club that he would not be retained after the 2025–26 season. He subsequently announced his retirement from football on 31 May.

== International career ==
Najib has played for Brunei Under-21 since 2005, and is the only player to have played in 4 Hassanal Bolkiah tournaments, winning the trophy in 2012. He regards his injury-time free-kick against Cambodia in that year's opening match as the best goal he has ever scored.

Najib scored in Brunei Under-23's first match against Timor-Leste at the 2011 SEA Games football tournament, but the team lost 1–2. He then played in all five matches as Brunei finished fifth in their group.

Najib's full international debut for the Wasps came in the 2008 AFC Challenge Cup qualification held in the Philippines where he played in all three games. He was also ever-present for Brunei's AFF Suzuki Cup qualifying campaigns in 2012 and 2014. For the 2016 edition he was deployed at left-back, but did not finish the game due to injury which would keep him out of the rest of the games.

Najib was in the list for the 2016 AFC Solidarity Cup but initially did not travel with the rest of the squad. Nevertheless, he recovered and made the starting lineup for the opening match, and kept his place at left-back for the whole tournament as Brunei finished in fourth place.

Najib linked up with the Brunei national team for the two-legged 2018 AFF Suzuki Cup qualifying matches against Timor-Leste in early September 2018. He started the first leg at left-back in a 3–1 loss on 1 September in Kuala Lumpur. He kept his place in a more advanced role on the return leg at Hassanal Bolkiah National Stadium a week later and scored the only goal of the game. His winning goal gave Brunei their first ever home win for an international game, but the scoreline was not enough to qualify for the Suzuki Cup competition proper.

In June 2019, Najib was due to link up with the national team for the 2022 World Cup qualification matches against Mongolia, but pulled himself out of contention.

Najib played in three friendly games for Brunei in 2022, against Malaysia away in May and against both the Maldives and Laos home in October. He also played in both matches of the 2022 AFF Mitsubishi Electric Cup qualifying against Timor-Leste, where the Wasps prevailed 6–3 on aggregate to qualify for the regional tournament for the first time in 26 years. In the group stage, he played twice against powerhouses Thailand and Indonesia, both resulting in losses for Brunei.

Although named in the 25-man Brunei squad for the 2026 World Cup qualification matches against Indonesia in October 2023, as well as featuring in previous friendly matches in the year, Najib was left out of the matchday squad in both games. He was restored in the national team setup in June 2024 when the team was made up of almost entirely DPMM FC and led by their current head coach Rui Capela against Sri Lanka for two matches. He was fielded in both games as the Wasps claimed a double victory over the Lankans.

Under caretaker coach Jamie McAllister, Najib was selected for both the play-offs for the third round of the 2027 Asian Cup qualification and the 2024 ASEAN Championship qualification. He managed two starts against Timor-Leste for the latter assignment in October which finished 0–1 in aggregate to the opponents.

=== International goals ===
Scores and results list Brunei's goal tally first.

No.	Date	Venue	Opponent	Score	Result	Competition
1.	8 September 2018	Hassanal Bolkiah National Stadium, Bandar Seri Begawan, Brunei	Timor-Leste	1–0	1–0	2018 AFF Championship qualification

== Honours ==
=== Team ===
NBT FC

- B-League Premier Two: 2004

DPMM FC

- S.League: 2015
- Singapore Premier League: 2019
- Singapore League Cup (2): 2012, 2014
- Brunei FA Cup: 2022

=== International ===
- Hassanal Bolkiah Trophy: 2012

=== Individual ===
- Meritorious Service Medal (PJK; 2012)
- General Service Medal (Police)

== Personal life ==
Najib has nine siblings, one of which is Na'im Tarif who plays for MS PPDB.
