= Awaludin (name) =

Awaludin is an Indonesian / Malaysian name. Notable people with the name include:

- Awaludin (1916–1980), Indonesian actor
- Awaludin Said, Malaysian politician
- Hamid Awaludin, Indonesian diplomat
- Ridwan Awaludin (born 1992), Indonesian footballer
