= Yura Indera Putera =

Bruneian footballer (born 1996)

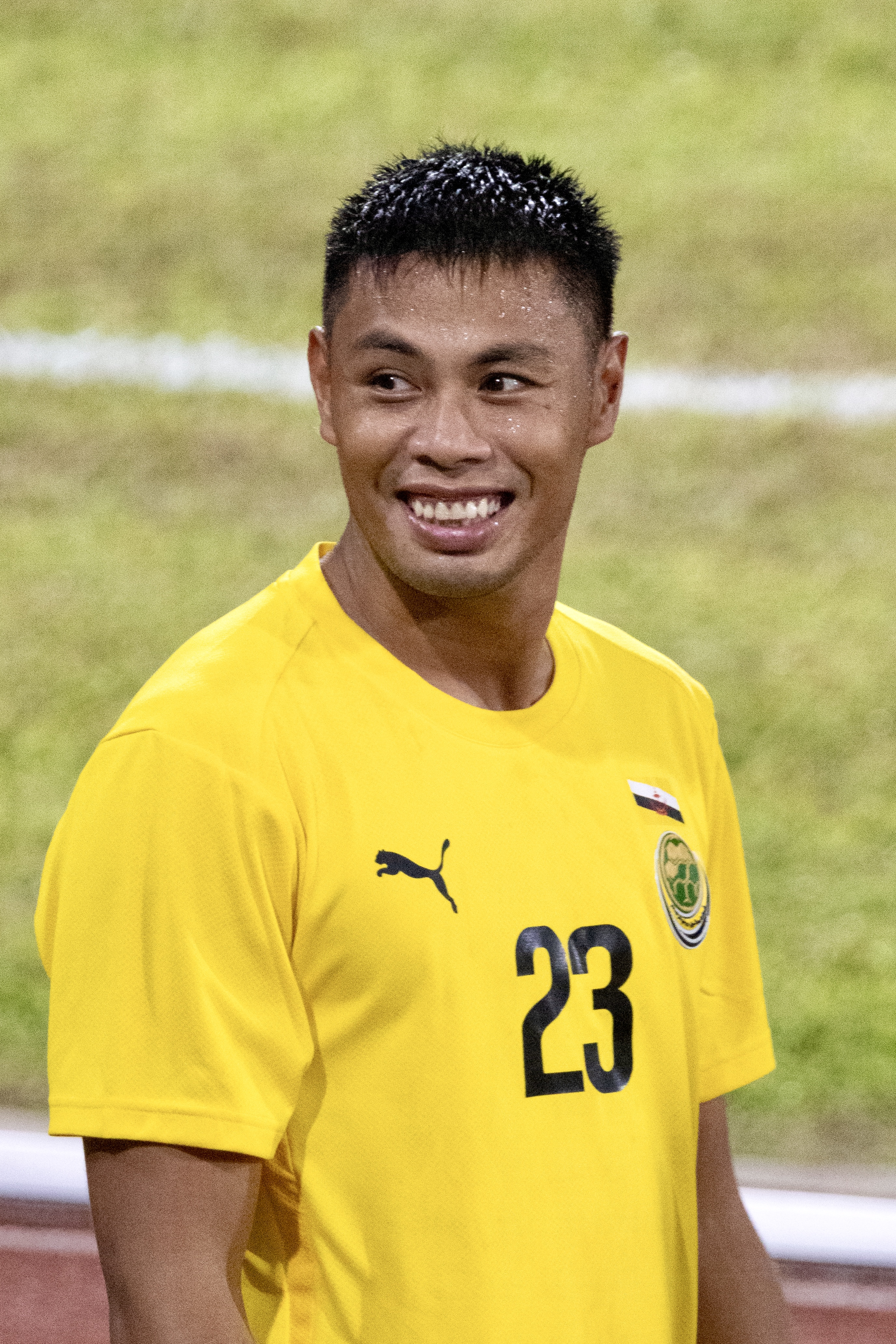
- Yura with Brunei in 2024

Personal information
- Full name: Pengiran Yura Indera Putera bin Pengiran Yunos
- Date of birth: 25 March 1996 (age 30)
- Place of birth: Bandar Seri Begawan, Brunei
- Height: 1.83 m (6 ft 0 in)
- Positions: Defender; midfielder

Team information
- Current team: DPMM FC
- Number: 23

Youth career
- 2010–2012: PIP

Senior career*
Years	Team	Apps	(Gls)
2012	BIBD SRC		
2014	Majra		
2015–	DPMM	137	(3)

International career^{‡}
2011–2014	Brunei U18		
2013–2014	Brunei U19	8	(0)
2013–2017	Brunei U23	9	(0)
2014–2018	Brunei U21	6	(1)
2014–	Brunei	28	(0)
- * Club domestic league appearances and goals as of 11 May 2026 ‡ National team caps and goals as of 4 June 2026

Pengiran Yura Indera Putera bin Pengiran Yunos (born 25 March 1996) is a Bruneian professional footballer who plays as a defender or midfielder for DPMM and the Brunei national team.

== Club career ==
Yura is a graduate of local grassroots football development scheme Projek Ikan Pusu (PIP) that has won many youth tournaments since its creation in 2001. He had a stint in the Bruneian leagues in 2012, lacing up for BIBD SRC in the Brunei National Football League, the precursor to the first season of the Brunei Super League.

Yura joined Majra FC for the 2014 season. His Majra career ended just 9 matches into the season after his club abruptly pulled out of the ongoing league.

Yura was selected to join Brunei's sole professional club DPMM FC at the start of 2015, alongside Khairul Anwar Abdul Rahim, Reduan Petara and Aminuddin Zakwan Tahir. He made 9 appearances for DPMM in the 2015 S.League, mostly as a substitute. From the beginning of the 2016 season, Yura was converted into a central defender by Steve Kean partly due to the departure of Boris Raspudić and also to give him more playing time.

Yura scored his first goal for DPMM on 5 August 2016 at home against Albirex Niigata (S), a last-minute winner against the expatriate Japanese side.

After three fruitful seasons under Kean, new Brazilian coach Renê Weber preferred to play a returning Abdul Aziz Tamit instead, restricting Yura to just eight appearances in the 2018 season. Nevertheless, under Adrian Pennock the following year, Yura managed to regain his starting place alongside Charlie Clough and Nur Ikhwan Othman in a back three formation. DPMM would then record the joint best defensive record of the league, emerging as champions by the time the league ended in September.

DPMM played domestically from 2020 to 2022 due to restrictions imposed by Brunei as a result of the COVID-19 pandemic. They competed in the 2022 Brunei FA Cup where Yura gained his first Brunei FA Cup winner's medal after winning the final 2–1 against Kasuka FC on 4 December.

DPMM returned to the Singapore Premier League starting from the 2023 season. In the match against Balestier Khalsa on 10 March, he was sent off for violent conduct in the 55th minute, making Balestier rally from two goals down to win 3–4. On the 31st of the same month, he scored a volley from outside the box against Hougang United in a 0–3 win.

In the first match for DPMM of the 2024–25 season on 11 May 2024, Yura scored the winner in a 1–2 win over Young Lions at Jalan Besar Stadium.

DPMM moved to the Malaysia Super League from the 2025–26 season. In the match against Kelantan TRW on 22 September 2025, Yura overhit a backpass to his goalkeeper Haimie Abdullah Nyaring and scored an own goal that initiated a 0–4 home defeat for DPMM. In the following month against JDT away at Iskandar Puteri Yura scored another own goal which was one of the ten goals the Malaysian powerhouses converted without reply.

== International career ==
=== Youth ===
Yura regularly appeared for Brunei at under-19, under-21 and under-23 levels even before his senior international debut in 2014. His first international tournament was the September 2013 AFF U-19 Youth Championship held in Indonesia where he started all of Brunei U19's five matches. Two months later, he joined the SEA Games contingent of Brunei for its 27th edition in Myanmar. He started the second and third games against Malaysia and Singapore respectively as Brunei U23 lost all their games in the football tournament.

Yura's next tournament was the 2014 AFC U-19 Championship qualification with the under-19s. Brunei placed bottom with three losses in their qualifying group that included North Korea, Thailand and Singapore. He was in the 2014 Hassanal Bolkiah Trophy squad for the defense of the Hassanal Bolkiah Trophy which Brunei U21 won in 2012 and played three games out of five.

Yura was back with the U23s in 2015 for the 2016 AFC U-23 Championship qualification held in March of that year and also the 28th SEA Games in Singapore. He played 6 games in total, losing in every game.

Yura was called back to the under-21 side for the 2018 Hassanal Bolkiah Trophy held in April and May, as an overage player as he was a few months over the age limit. Playing in central defence for the tournament, he scored a last-minute winner against Thailand in the second match.

=== Senior ===
Yura was selected for the Skuad Tabuan to compete in the 2014 AFF Suzuki Cup qualifying matches held in Laos in October 2014. With the team composed largely of Brunei DPMM FC players and led by its head coach Steve Kean, his future club coach started Yura for the crucial game against Myanmar in which they fell to a score of 1–3. Yura kept his place for the final game against Cambodia, losing 0–1.

Yura played for the national team at the 2016 AFF Suzuki Cup qualification matches held in Cambodia in October 2016, playing at centre-back to cover for Reduan Petara who was ruled out with injury. He was sent off in the 88th minute for a professional foul on Tith Dina in the second fixture, a 0–3 loss against hosts Cambodia.

Yura was one of 13 DPMM FC players to link up with the Brunei national team in early September 2018 for the AFF Suzuki Cup qualification matches of that year, against Timor-Leste. He was deployed by Kwon Oh-son in central midfield in the first leg which finished 3–1 to Timor-Leste. A reshuffling of tactics in the second leg saw Yura put on a commanding display at centre-back and resulted in a 1–0 shutout in favour of Brunei. Nevertheless, Brunei failed to advance to the Suzuki Cup group stage with a 2–3 aggregate loss.

Yura accepted a callup to the national team to face Mongolia home and away at the 2022 World Cup qualification held in June 2019. He was played in central midfield since several of his teammates pulled out of the Brunei selection. Brunei lost the first leg 2–0 away from Bandar Seri Begawan and managed to win 2–1 for the return leg, but nevertheless another repeat aggregate defeat sent the Wasps out of both the 2022 World Cup and the 2023 Asian Cup.

In September 2022, Yura returned to the national team and started both fixtures in a friendly tournament with the Maldives and Laos, recording one win and one loss for the Wasps. Later in December of that year, he was selected for the 2022 AFF Mitsubishi Electric Cup to be held in the participants' respective countries, although Brunei had to play their home games in Kuala Lumpur due to renovation works at the Hassanal Bolkiah National Stadium. In the first group game against Thailand, Yura scored an own goal in the 88th minute of normal time, which finished 0–5. He made three further appearances for the Wasps against the Philippines, Indonesia and Cambodia, all ending in heavy defeats.

In September 2023, Yura played in a friendly match away against Hong Kong that finished in a shock 10–0 loss. The following month, he was the starting defender for the Wasps at the two-legged 2026 World Cup qualification matches against Indonesia. Both matches ended 0–6 to the Garuda.

After becoming the starting central defender in four friendly matches for Brunei in 2024, Yura appeared in the same number of matches for the Wasps against Macau as well as Timor-Leste at the play-offs for the third round of the 2027 AFC Asian Cup and 2024 ASEAN Championship qualification respectively. Although managing to win against Macau 4–0 on aggregate and thus creating a remarkable five game unbeaten streak, Brunei lost the Timor-Leste tie 0–1 on aggregate. Yura closed the year playing the full 90 minutes in a defeat against Russia, conceding 11 unanswered goals.

Yura returned to the team a full year later for the fifth fixture of the 2027 Asian Cup qualification against Lebanon at home on 18 November. Playing in an unaccustomed right wing back position, Yura and the Wasps could not prevent the Cedars from dominating the game, and the match ended in favour of Lebanon via three unanswered goals.

In June 2026, Yura was selected for the 2026 ASEAN Championship qualification matches against Timor-Leste, and started the home leg in defensive midfield in a 0–3 loss.

== Honours ==
DPMM FC

- S.League: 2015
- Singapore Premier League: 2019
- Brunei FA Cup: 2022
