= Khairul Anwar Abdul Rahim =

Bruneian footballer (born 1992)

Khairul Anwar
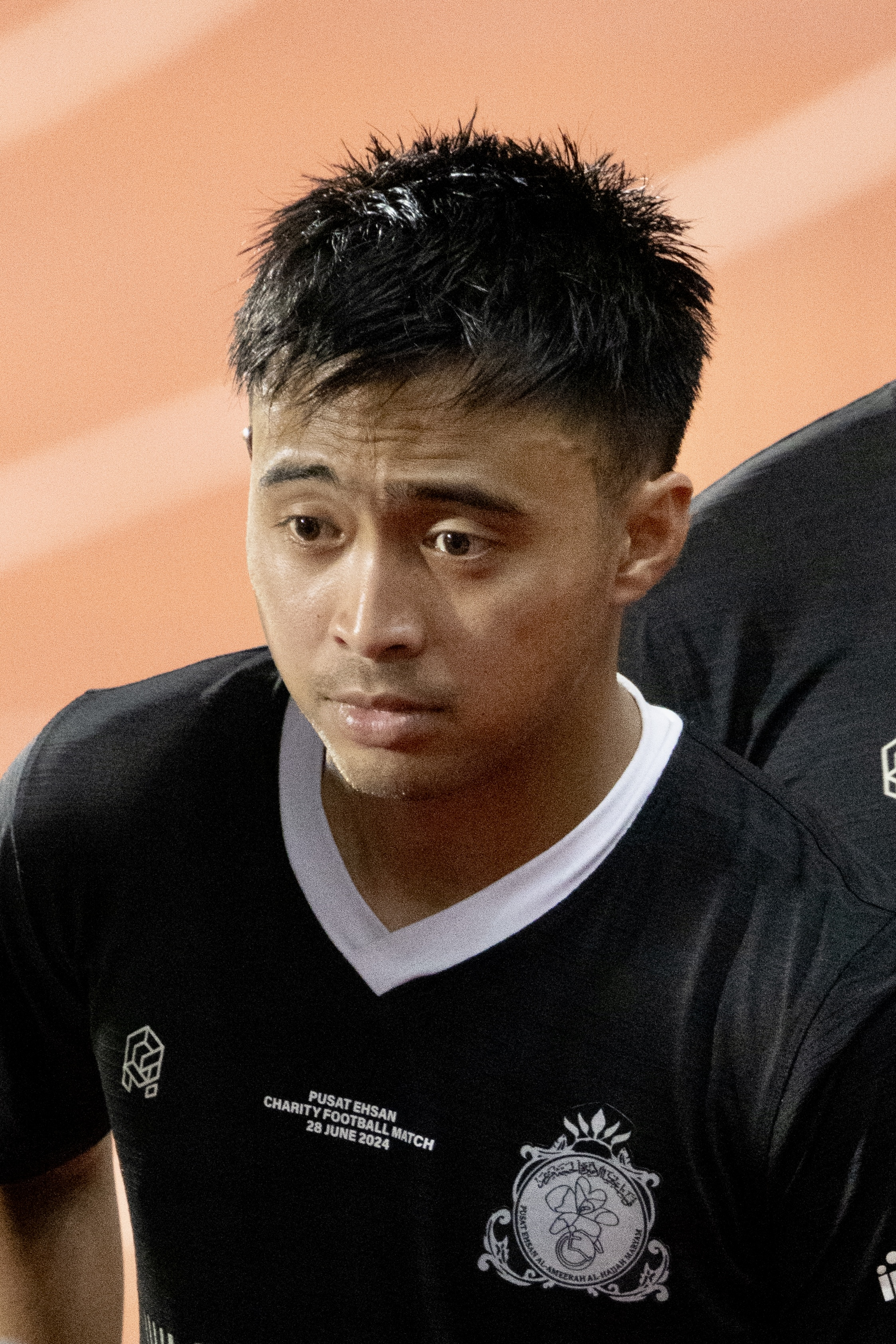
- Khairul in 2024

Personal information
- Full name: Mohammad Khairul Anwar bin Abdul Rahim
- Date of birth: 31 August 1994 (age 32)
- Place of birth: Brunei
- Height: 1.80 m (5 ft 11 in)
- Position: Midfielder

Team information
- Current team: Kasuka FC
- Number: 16

Youth career
- Indera

Senior career*
Years	Team	Apps	(Gls)
2011–2014	Indera		(3)
2015–2017	DPMM	8	(0)
2018–2025	Kasuka		(5)
2026–	Kasuka	4	(1)
- * Club domestic league appearances and goals as of 8 November 2026 ‡ National team caps and goals as of 8 March 2017

Mohammad Khairul Anwar bin Abdul Rahim (born 31 August 1994) is a Bruneian footballer who plays for Brunei Super League side Kasuka FC as a midfielder.

== Career ==
Khairul trained with the youth system of Indera SC and made his league debut in 2011. He won the first two Brunei Super League championships in 2012–13 and 2014. The following season, he was one of four local recruits selected to play for Brunei's professional club DPMM FC, along with Indera teammate Reduan Petara, Yura Indera Putera Yunos and Aminuddin Zakwan Tahir. He failed to make an appearance in DPMM's title-winning season of 2015.

Khairul found form at the start of 2016 and was a second-half substitute in the season-opening Community Shield on 13 February which DPMM lost 3–2. However, by March he failed to remain in Steve Kean's plans after two further substitute appearances.

He was released in February 2018, ending a three-year spell with only five league appearances to his name. He promptly moved to Kasuka FC where he has been playing since, winning the league in 2023 and 2024–25.

== Honours ==
=== Team ===
Indera SC

- Brunei Super League (2): 2012–13, 2014

DPMM FC

- S.League: 2015

Kasuka FC

- Brunei Super League (2): 2023, 2024–25
