= Vincent Salas =

Chilean professional footballer (born 1989)

Personal information
- Full name: Vincent Armando Salas Reyes
- Date of birth: 2 April 1989 (age 37)
- Place of birth: Santiago, Chile
- Position: Centre-back

Senior career*
Years	Team	Apps	(Gls)
2012	Deportes Rengo		
2012 – 2014	Fernández Vial		
2014	Deportes Concepción	0	(0)
2014 – 2017	Deportes Puerto Montt	50	(1)
2017	DPMM FC	10	(0)
2018	Deportes Copiapó	12	(1)
2019	Fernández Vial	17	(1)
- * Club domestic league appearances and goals

Vincent Armando Salas Reyes (born 2 April 1989 in Santiago, Chile) is a Chilean former professional footballer who plays for Fernandez Vial of the Segunda División Profesional de Chile as a defender.

== DPMM FC ==
Transferring to Bruneian club DPMM in 2017 with fellow Chilean Daud Gazale, Salas adapted well, making his target to help the team advance up the standings and recording his debut in a 4–0 loss to Albirex Niigata S.

A tall player, he was described by DPMM coach Steve Kean as 'dominant in the air' but also showed a propensity for fouling, picking up a straight red card in a 1–4 defeat to Home United, his team's 12th loss of the season.
