= 2012 Hassanal Bolkiah Trophy =

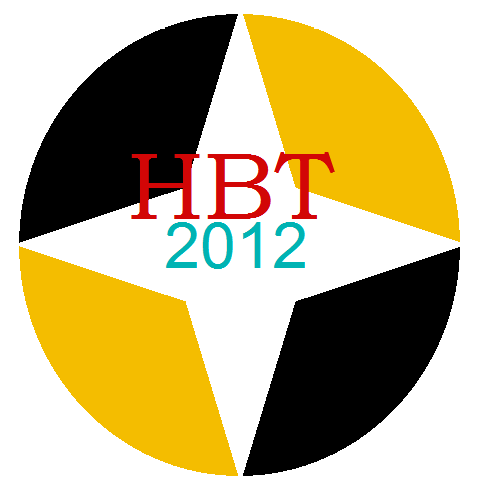
- Hassanal Bolkiah Trophy 2012 logo

Tournament details
- Host country: Brunei
- Dates: 24 February – 9 March
- Teams: 10
- Venues: 3 (in 1 host city)

Final positions
- Champions: Brunei (1st title)
- Runners-up: Indonesia
- Third place: Myanmar; Vietnam (shared)

Tournament statistics
- Matches played: 23
- Goals scored: 65 (2.83 per match)
- Top scorer(s): (Myanmar) Kyaw Zayar Win (6 goals)

The 2012 Hassanal Bolkiah Trophy was the fourth edition of the invitational tournament hosted by Brunei. The tournament took place in Brunei between 25 February and 5 March 2012. The competition is for players under the age of 22 and is being held only for the fourth time after 2002, 2005 and 2007. The tournament was not held in 2009 following the suspension imposed on the Brunei Amateur Football Association (BAFA) by FIFA. The organisers of the Hassanal Bolkiah Trophy 2012 have offered US$15,500 as reward for the champions. Originally, all ASEAN teams were supposed to participate at Hassanal Bolkiah Trophy 2012 (HBT 2012). However, Thailand eventually withdrew before any match were played.

Brunei emerged as the champion after beating Indonesia by 2–0 in the final, while both Myanmar and Vietnam shared the third place.

== Venues ==
Hassanal Bolkiah National Stadium	Berakas Sports Complex	Track & Field Sports Complex
4°55′44″N 114°56′42″E	4.9369°N 114.9400°E	4.9312280°N 114.9470584°E
Capacity: 30,000	Capacity: 5,000	Capacity: 1,700

== Officials ==
Eight referees and ten assistants were selected for the tournament:

Number	Referee	Assistants	
1	(Brunei) Hamidin Shahbudin	(Brunei) Mohd Nor Khairi Haji Hussain	(Brunei) Mohd Ali Haji Mohd Talib
2	(Cambodia) Virak Khoun	(Cambodia) Kyvadhana Yean	
3	(Cambodia) Vichhika Tuy	(Indonesia) Edo Wiradana	(Laos) Somphavanh Lounglath
4	(Malaysia) Mohd Amirul Izwan Yaacob	(Malaysia) Sivanesan Muniandy	
5	(Myanmar) Min Hla	(Myanmar) Tun Min	
6	(Philippines) Jovanie Villagracia	(Philippines) Roy Villaranda	(Philippines) Roberto Hernandez
7	(Thailand) Mongkolchai Pechsri	(Thailand) Manop Pansakorn	
8	(Vietnam) Võ Quang Vinh		

Match Commissioner & Referee Assessor

Match Commissioner	Referee Assessor
(Myanmar) Ye Htut Tint	(Brunei) Mohd Noor Abdullah
(Brunei) Pg Aliyudin Pg Hj Tajudin	(Singapore) Ali Samad

== Squads ==
Each nation must submit a squad of 20 players, 17 of which must be born on or after 1 January 1991, and 3 of which can be older dispensation players, by 17 February 2012.

== Group stage ==
- All times are Brunei Darussalam Time (BNT) – UTC+8.

=== Tie-breaking criteria ===
The teams are ranked according to points (3 points for a win, 1 point for a tie, 0 points for a loss) and tie breakers are in following order:

1. Greater number of points obtained in the group matches between the teams concerned;
2. Goal difference resulting from the group matches between the teams concerned;
3. Greater number of goals scored in the group matches between the teams concerned;
4. Result of direct matches;
5. Drawing of lots.

=== Group A ===
Team	Pld	W	D	L	GF	GA	GD	Pts
Myanmar	4	3	1	0	13	3	+10	10
Indonesia	4	2	1	1	7	4	+3	7
Laos	4	2	0	2	5	5	0	6
Singapore	4	1	2	1	3	4	−1	5
Philippines	4	0	0	4	4	16	−12	0

24 February 2012
16:15

Philippines	2 – 8	Myanmar
Angeles 39'; Beloya 85'	Report	Thein Than Win 13'; Mai Aih Naing 14'; Kyaw Zayar Win 45' (pen.), 49' (pen.), 67'; Kaung Si Thu 46'; Thet Naing 75', 90'

Berakas Sports Complex, B. S. Begawan
24 February 2012
20:15

Laos	0 – 2	Indonesia
	Report	Andik 3'; Keoviengphet 89' (o.g.)

Track & Field Sports Complex, B. S. Begawan

26 February 2012
20:15

Indonesia	1 – 1	Singapore
Nurmufid 81'	Report	Faris 11'

Hassanal Bolkiah National Stadium, B. S. Begawan
26 February 2012
20:15

Laos	3 – 1	Philippines
Sitthideth 21'; Soukaphone 22'; Keoviengphet 25'	Report	Marasigan 41'

Track & Field Sports Complex, B. S. Begawan

28 February 2012
20:15

Singapore	0 – 2	Laos
	Report	Soukaphone 48'; Sitthideth 69'

Berakas Sports Complex, B. S. Begawan
28 February 2012
20:15

Myanmar	3 – 1	Indonesia
Kyaw Zayar Win 47'; Kyaw Ko Ko 58', 66'	Report	Andik 19'

Hassanal Bolkiah National Stadium, B. S. Begawan

2 March 2012
20:15

Laos	0 – 2	Myanmar
	Report	Kyaw Ko Ko 38'; Kyaw Zayar Win 87'

Track & Field Sports Complex, B. S. Begawan
2 March 2012
20:15

Philippines	1 – 2	Singapore
Marasigan 55'	Report	Shamil 18'; Dong Junming 90+2'

Hassanal Bolkiah National Stadium, B. S. Begawan

4 March 2012
20:15

Indonesia	3 – 0	Philippines
Andik 18', 44' (pen.); Yosua 63'	Report

Berakas Sports Complex, B. S. Begawan
4 March 2012
20:15

Myanmar	0 – 0	Singapore
	Report

Track & Field Sports Complex, B. S. Begawan

=== Group B ===
Team	Pld	W	D	L	GF	GA	GD	Pts
Vietnam	4	3	1	0	6	2	+4	10
Brunei	4	3	0	1	8	4	+4	9
Timor-Leste	4	2	0	2	3	3	0	6
Malaysia	4	1	1	2	3	6	−3	4
Cambodia	4	0	0	4	4	9	−5	0

25 February 2012
16:00

Malaysia	0 – 0	Vietnam
	Report

Track & Field Sports Complex, B. S. Begawan
25 February 2012
21:00

Brunei	3 – 2	Cambodia
Hendra 44'; Adi 75'; Najib 90+1'	Report	Mony Udom 6' (pen.); Vathanaka 83'

Hassanal Bolkiah National Stadium, B. S. Begawan

27 February 2012
20:15

Timor-Leste	2 – 0	Malaysia
Alves 7'; Rangel 38'	Report

Berakas Sports Complex, B. S. Begawan
27 February 2012
20:15

Cambodia	1 – 2	Vietnam
Vathanak 90+2'	Report	Quế Ngọc Hải 53'; Phạm Hoàng Lâm 90+1'

Track & Field Sports Complex, B. S. Begawan

29 February 2012
20:15

Cambodia	0 – 1	Timor-Leste
	Report	Januário 90+1'

Track & Field Sports Complex, B. S. Begawan
29 February 2012
20:15

Brunei	1 – 2	Vietnam
Adi 4'	Report	Phan Đình Thắng 53'; Cao Xuân Thắng 90+3'

Hassanal Bolkiah National Stadium, B. S. Begawan

3 March 2012
20:15

Vietnam	2 – 0	Timor-Leste
Đào Duy Khánh 81'; Nguyễn Xuân Nam 90+1'	Report

Berakas Sports Complex, B. S. Begawan
3 March 2012
20:15

Brunei	3 – 0	Malaysia
Adi 8'; Aminuddin 17'; Gan Jay Han 23' (o.g.)	Report

Hassanal Bolkiah National Stadium, B. S. Begawan

5 March 2012
20:15

Malaysia	3 – 1	Cambodia
Amir 3'; Ridzuan 84'; Yazid 86'	Report	Sothearath 9'

Track & Field Sports Complex, B. S. Begawan
5 March 2012
20:15

Brunei	1 – 0	Timor-Leste
Aminuddin 29'	Report

Hassanal Bolkiah National Stadium, B. S. Begawan

== Knockout stage ==
Semi-finals
7 March – B. S. Begawan
Vietnam	0
Indonesia	2
7 March – B. S. Begawan
Myanmar	2
Brunei	3

Final
9 March – B. S. Begawan
Indonesia	0
Brunei	2

=== Semi-finals ===
7 March 2012
16:00

Vietnam	0 – 2	Indonesia
	Report	Mikko 36'; Andik 70'

Hassanal Bolkiah National Stadium, B. S. Begawan

7 March 2012
20:15

Myanmar	2 – 3	Brunei
Yan Aung Win 36'; Kyaw Zayar Win 90+5'	Report	Ikhwan 55'; Azwan 61'; Adi 79'

Hassanal Bolkiah National Stadium, B. S. Begawan

=== Final ===
9 March 2012
20:30 UTC+8

Indonesia	0 – 2	Brunei
	Report	Aminuddin 48'; Adi 75'

Hassanal Bolkiah National Stadium
Attendance: 26,000
Referee: Mongkolchai Pechsri (Thailand)

Indonesia
Brunei

GK	12	Aji Saka
CB	4	Syaiful Cahya
CB	5	Agus Nova
CB	2	Achmad Faris
RWB	13	Kurniawan Karman
LWB	6	Nurmufid Khoirot
CM	10	Andik Vermansyah (c)
CM	8	Ridwan Awaludin		(substituted off) 74'
CM	3	Samsul Arifin
CF	7	Yosua Pahabol
CF	19	Mikko Ardianto
Substitutes:
GK	1	Muhammad Ridwan
DF	25	Achmad Hisyam
MF	11	Fadly Manna
MF	18	Anugerah Agung
MF	21	Ryan Putra Maylandu
FW	14	Abdul Kamil Sembiring	(yellow card) 90'	(substituted on) 74'
FW	17	Husin Rahaningmas
Coach:
Widodo Cahyono Putro

GK	25	Fakhrul Zulhazmi
CB	2	Afi Aminuddin	(yellow card) 58'
CB	10	Nur Ikhwan Othman
CB	13	Hazwan Hamzah
RM	12	Azri Zahari	(yellow card) 49'
CM	9	Hendra Azam		(substituted off) 69'
CM	7	Azwan Ali Rahman
LM	11	Najib Tarif (c)
RF	18	Aminuddin Zakwan
CF	20	Adi Said
LF	6	Abdul Mu'iz Sisa	(yellow card) 56'
Substitutes:
GK	22	Ahsanuddin Dani
DF	3	Safwan Amaluddin
DF	5	Reduan Petara		(substituted on) 69'
DF	15	Yazid Azmi
MF	4	Abdul Halim Hassan
FW	14	Aqmal Hakeem Hamid
FW	17	Shafie Effendy
Coach:
(South Korea) Kwon Oh-son

Man of the Match: Adi Said

2012 Hassanal Bolkiah Trophy
(Brunei)
Brunei
First title

== Goalscorers ==
6 goals

- (Myanmar) Kyaw Zayar Win

5 goals

- (Brunei) Adi Said
- (Indonesia) Andik Vermansyah

3 goals

- (Brunei) Aminuddin Zakwan
- (Myanmar) Kyaw Ko Ko

2 goals

- (Laos) Sitthideth Khanthavong
- (Laos) Soukaphone Vongchiengkham
- (Myanmar) Thet Naing
- (Philippines) Angelo Marasigan

1 goal

- (Brunei) Hendra Azam
- (Brunei) Najib Tarif
- (Brunei) Nur Ikhwan Othman
- (Brunei) Azwan Ali Rahman
- (Cambodia) Chan Vathanaka
- (Cambodia) Chhun Sothearath
- (Cambodia) Prak Mony Udom
- (Cambodia) Teab Vathanak
- (Indonesia) Mikko Ardianto
- (Indonesia) Nurmufid Khoirot
- (Indonesia) Yosua Pahabol
- (Laos) Keoviengphet Liththideth
- (Malaysia) Yazid Zaini
- (Malaysia) Ridzuan Abdunloh
- (Malaysia) Wan Amirzafran
- (Myanmar) Kaung Si Thu
- (Myanmar) Mai Aih Naing
- (Myanmar) Thein Than Win
- (Myanmar) Yan Aung Win
- (Philippines) Marvin Angeles
- (Philippines) Joshua Beloya
- (Singapore) Dong Junming
- (Singapore) Faris Ramli
- (Singapore) Shamil Sharif
- (Timor-Leste) Diogo Rangel
- (Timor-Leste) Januário da Costa
- (Timor-Leste) Jorge Manuel Alves
- (Vietnam) Cao Xuân Thắng
- (Vietnam) Đào Duy Khánh
- (Vietnam) Nguyễn Xuân Nam
- (Vietnam) Phạm Hoàng Lâm
- (Vietnam) Phan Đình Thắng
- (Vietnam) Quế Ngọc Hải

Own goal

- (Laos) Keoviengphet Liththideth (for Indonesia)
- (Malaysia) Gan Jay Han (for Brunei)

== Team statistics ==
As per statistical convention in football, matches decided in extra time are counted as wins and losses, while matches decided by penalty shoot-outs are counted as draws.

Pos	Team	Pld	W	D	L	GF	GA	GD
1	Brunei	6	5	0	1	13	6	+7
2	Indonesia	6	3	1	2	9	6	+3
3	Myanmar	5	3	1	1	15	6	+9
3	Vietnam	5	3	1	1	6	4	+2
4	Laos	4	2	0	2	5	5	0
5	Timor-Leste	4	2	0	2	3	3	0
6	Singapore	4	1	2	1	3	4	−1
7	Malaysia	4	1	1	2	3	6	−3
8	Cambodia	4	0	0	4	4	9	−5
9	Philippines	4	0	0	4	4	16	−12
