= Tarmizi Johari =

Bruneian footballer

Personal information
- Full name: Mohammad Tarmizi bin Haji Mat Johari
- Date of birth: 26 December 1983 (age 42)
- Place of birth: Brunei
- Height: 1.66 m (5 ft 5 in)
- Position: Goalkeeper

Senior career*
Years	Team	Apps	(Gls)
2003–2006	QAF FC		
2007–2013	MS ABDB		
2014	DPMM		
2015–2021	MS ABDB	55	(0)

International career^{‡}
2015–2018	Brunei	2	(0)
- * Club domestic league appearances and goals as of 5 July 2022 ‡ National team caps and goals as of 30 November 2016

Soldadu Mohammad Tarmizi bin Haji Mat Johari (born 26 December 1983) is a Bruneian footballer who last played for MS ABDB and the Brunei national team as a goalkeeper. He had a brief spell with professional club Brunei DPMM FC in 2014. He is tied with Paraguay's Pedro Benítez as the shortest goalkeeper to have ever appeared for an international football match.

== Club career ==
Tarmizi began playing league football with QAF FC, then transferred to the football team of the Royal Brunei Armed Forces, MS ABDB from the 2007-08 season onwards. He has won four league titles and six FA Cups with the Armymen to date.

Tarmizi moved to Brunei DPMM FC in early 2014 to serve as third-choice goalkeeper behind Wardun Yussof and Azman Ilham Noor. He was released and promptly rejoined MS ABDB after the season ended.

== International career ==
Tarmizi was first selected for the Brunei national football team at the 2018 World Cup qualifying matches against Chinese Taipei in early 2015. He became a regular squad member for the Wasps but was finally handed his first appearance at the 2016 AFC Solidarity Cup held in Malaysia. At the semi-final against Macau on 12 November, first-choice goalkeeper Wardun Yussof was sent off for a foul outside the box, Tarmizi conceded the resulting free-kick after a deflection. He held on between the goalposts until the game went to penalties, where Brunei missed twice to lose the shootout 4–3. He started the ensuing third place match which Brunei was defeated 3–2.

Tarmizi was selected for the 2018 AFF Suzuki Cup qualification matches against Timor-Leste in September.

== Honours ==
MS ABDB

- Brunei Super League (4): 2015, 2016, 2017–18, 2018–19
- Brunei FA Cup (6): 2007–08, 2009–10, 2012, 2014–15, 2015, 2016
- Sumbangsih Cup: 2016

Individual

- Brunei Super League Best Player: 2016
