= Amir Ajmal Tahir =

Bruneian footballer

Personal information
- Full name: Mohd Amir Ajmal bin Mohd Tahir
- Date of birth: 7 January 1985 (age 41)
- Place of birth: Brunei
- Height: 1.63 m (5 ft 4 in)
- Position: Midfielder

Senior career*
Years	Team	Apps	(Gls)
2007–2014	MS ABDB		
2017–2018	MS ABDB	12	(0)
2020	Gladiators Force		

International career^{‡}
2008	Brunei	3	(0)
- * Club domestic league appearances and goals as of 17 February 2020 ‡ National team caps and goals as of 29 October 2015

Lance Corporal (U) Mohammad Amir Ajmal bin Mohammad Tahir is a footballer from Brunei who plays as a midfielder.

Amir Ajmal was an international footballer for the Brunei national football team. He was selected for the preliminary squad for the 2012 AFF Suzuki Cup, but ultimately did not feature in the final squad.

His younger brother Aminuddin Zakwan Tahir is also a footballer.
