= Mu'izzuddin Ismail =

Bruneian footballer

Personal information
- Full name: Pengiran Muhammad Mu'izzuddin bin Pengiran Ismail
- Date of birth: 10 February 1987 (age 39)
- Place of birth: Brunei
- Height: 1.71 m (5 ft 7 in)
- Position: Goalkeeper

Team information
- Current team: MS PPDB
- Number: 1

Senior career*
Years	Team	Apps	(Gls)
2009–2011	Menglait FC		(1)
2012–2016	MS PDB		(1)
2017	DPMM FC	12	(0)
2018–2019	MS PDB		(0)
2020	DPMM FC II	2	(0)
2021	MS PPDB		(0)
2025–	MS PPDB	8	(0)

International career^{‡}
2015–2019	Brunei	1	(0)
- * Club domestic league appearances and goals as of 4 November 2026 ‡ National team caps and goals as of 28 February 2017

Pengiran Muhammad Mu'izzuddin bin Pengiran Ismail (born 10 February 1987) is a Bruneian footballer who plays as a goalkeeper for MS PPDB. Prior to signing for DPMM, he played for Menglait FC and also the Royal Brunei Police Force Sports Council while working as an auxiliary police officer.

Mu'izzuddin has scored two league goals, one for each of his two previous clubs, via penalty kicks. He joined Brunei's only professional club DPMM FC in early 2017, providing competition for Wardun Yussof and Alizanda Sitom. He made 19 appearances in all competitions, profiting from Wardun's uncharacteristic injury layoffs.

Mu'izzuddin was a member of the Brunei national football team, earning his first callup in March 2015. He gained his first international cap against Cambodia on 3 November 2015, conceding 3 goals in each half in a 6–1 loss. He was the reserve goalkeeper at the 2016 AFF Suzuki Cup qualification matches held in Cambodia. He played a similar role at the 2022 World Cup qualification matches against Mongolia in June 2019.
