= Alizanda Sitom =

Bruneian footballer

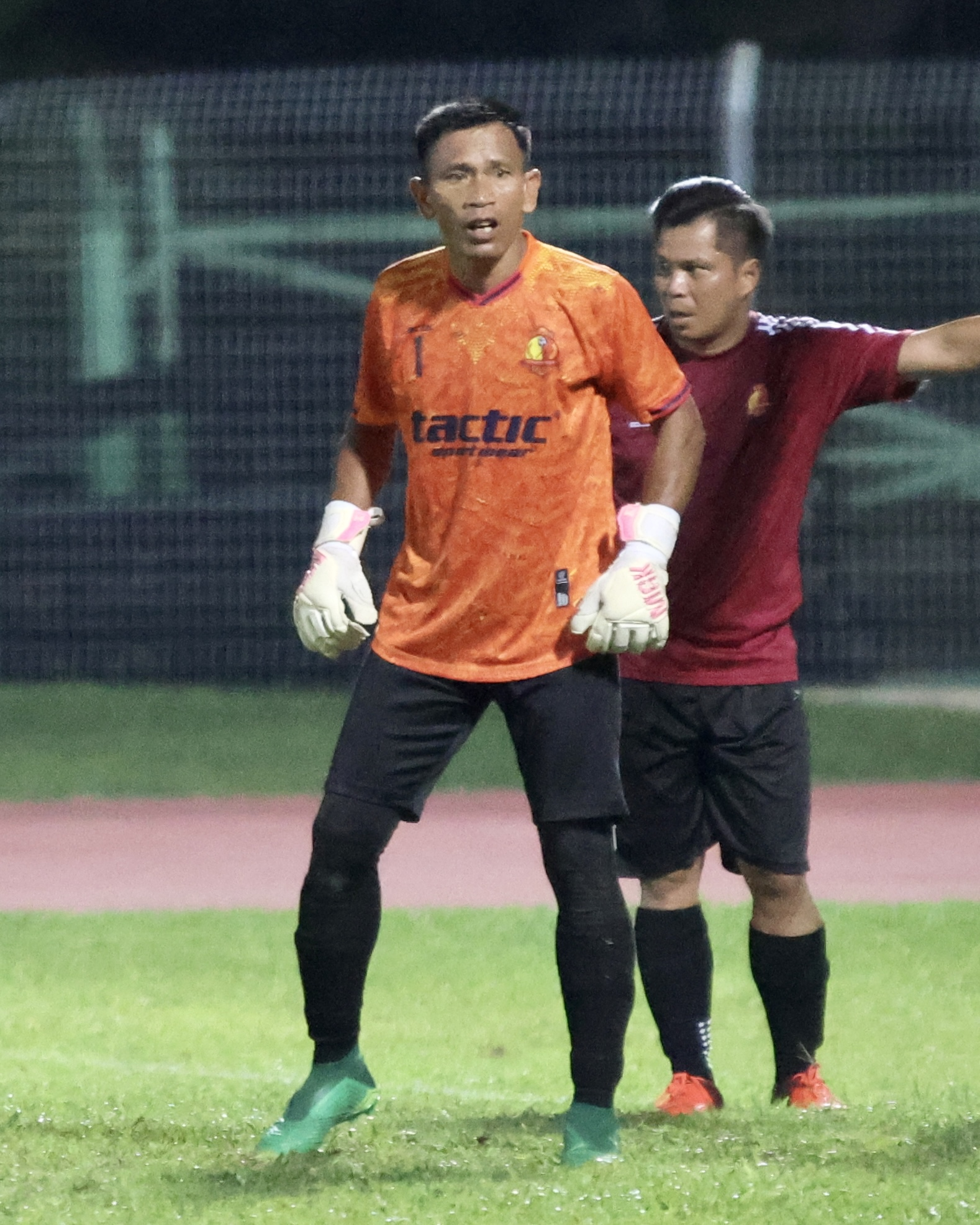
- Alizanda with Lun Bawang in 2023.

Personal information
- Full name: Alizanda bin Sitom
- Date of birth: 29 July 1970 (age 56)
- Place of birth: Brunei
- Position: Goalkeeper

Senior career*
| Years | Team | Apps | (Gls) |
| 1997–2005 | Brunei | | |
| 2002–2005 | ABDB | | |
| 2002 | → DPMM (loan) | | |
| 2005–2009 | DPMM | | |
| 2016–2017 | DPMM | 4 | (0) |
| 2023 | Lun Bawang | 8 | (0) |
- * Club domestic league appearances and goals as of 14 March 2025

Alizanda bin Sitom (born 29 July 1970) is a Bruneian former footballer who played as a goalkeeper. Having played for the Brunei national representative team in Malaysia's M-League System at the turn of the century, he is notable for returning to DPMM for a third spell at the age of 46.

In the year 2000, Alizanda was brought into the national representative team to replace Yunos Yusof who had retired after winning the Malaysia Cup the previous year. He was rotated with Jefry Mohammad and Ibrahim Abu Bakar as Brunei suffered relegation, and in the following season competed with a young Wardun Yussof for the goalkeeper position as Brunei began life in Malaysia's Premier Two. Domestically, he played for the football team of the Royal Brunei Armed Forces, MS ABDB. He made appearances for his future club DPMM FC in the AFC Champions League against Geylang FC in 2002. Later in the year, he would meet face to face with Wardun in the final of the first Brunei FA Cup competition, but conceded to a Norsillmy Taha strike in the 30th minute to yield the victory to Wijaya FC.

When DPMM replaced Brunei in the Malaysia Premier League at the start of the 2005–06 season, Alizanda transferred immediately to the royally-owned club, to compete for the goalkeeping position with Wardun Yussof and Hamzah Abdul Rahman. He gained promotion to the Malaysia Super League with DPMM but was largely second fiddle to Wardun. He was released in early 2009 following DPMM's signing of Azman Ilham Noor from NBT FC.

In the 2016 close season, DPMM announced that Alizanda had signed a contract after the release of Azman. Due to his age, he was assumed to be holding a coaching role but his head coach Steve Kean has confirmed that Alizanda will compete for the goalkeeping position with Wardun, rekindling a rivalry last occurred eight years ago.

On 2 April 2017, Alizanda started the match against Hougang United and kept a clean sheet in a 2–0 victory. It was his first competitive match in 8 years and made him the oldest player to play in the S.League aged 46 years, 8 months and 4 days. He made four league appearances in total, the last being a 9–3 drubbing by Home United. His age was 46 years, 9 months and 26 days on that date.

In 2023, Alizanda come out from retirement and signed for Brunei Super League club, Lun Bawang and was named the club captain ahead of the 2023 Brunei Super League season.
