= Chhun Sothearath =

Cambodian footballer

Chhun Sothearath ឈុន សុធារ័ត្ន
Personal information
- Date of birth: February 2, 1990 (age 36)
- Place of birth: Phnom Penh, State of Cambodia
- Height: 1.70 m (5 ft 7 in)

Senior career*
Years	Team	Apps	(Gls)
2007–2013	Build Bright United		
2013–2017	Boeung Ket Angkor		

International career
2008–2015	Cambodia	24	(0)

Managerial career
- 2018–: Boeung Ket Football Club U18
- * Club domestic league appearances and goals

Chhun Sothearath (born February 2, 1990, in Phnom Penh, Cambodia) is a Cambodian footballer who plays for home town club Boeung Ket Angkor in Cambodian League. He was called to Cambodia national football team at 2014 FIFA World Cup qualification.

== Honours ==
=== Club ===
Boeung Ket Angkor

- Cambodian League: 2016:2017
- 2015 Mekong Club Championship: Runner up
