= Haizul Rani Metusin =

Bruneian footballer

Haizul Rani
Personal information
- Full name: Mohammad Haizul Rani bin Metusin
- Date of birth: 1 May 1984 (age 42)
- Place of birth: Brunei
- Height: 1.64 m (5 ft 5 in)
- Position: Left-back

Team information
- Current team: MS ABDB
- Number: 5

Senior career*
Years	Team	Apps	(Gls)
2008	Brunei Shell FT		
2009–2017	MS ABDB		
2017	DPMM FC	11	(0)
2018–2019	MS ABDB	15	(2)
2020	Gladiators Force		

International career^{‡}
2012	Brunei	3	(0)
- * Club domestic league appearances and goals as of 10 March 2023 ‡ National team caps and goals as of 8 April 2015

Staff Sergeant Mohammad Haizul Rani bin Metusin (born 1 May 1984) is a Bruneian former footballer who played as a defender. He made appearances for Brunei's professional club DPMM FC in the 2017 S.League.

His international debut for Brunei came in the 0–5 loss against Indonesia in a friendly on 26 September 2012, replacing Reduan Petara. He played 2 games for the national team in the 2012 AFF Suzuki Cup qualification.
