= Yunos Yusof =

Bruneian footballer and coach (born 1965)

Personal information
- Full name: Haji Mohammad Yunos bin Haji Mohammad Yusof
- Date of birth: 1965 (age 60–61)
- Place of birth: Brunei
- Position: Goalkeeper

Senior career*
Years	Team	Apps	(Gls)
1985–1999	Brunei		
2002–2003	Kota Ranger		

International career^{‡}
1981	Brunei U16	2+	(0)
1985–1999	Brunei	10+	(0)
- * Club domestic league appearances and goals as of 17 May 2023 ‡ National team caps and goals as of 27 October 2025`

Haji Mohammad Yunos bin Haji Mohammad Yusof is a Bruneian former national football player and current futsal coach. He was once a goalkeeper renowned for his superb agility and dexterity during his time with the Brunei representative team playing in the Malaysia leagues, and he ended his career on a high by winning the 1999 Malaysia Cup.

== Playing career ==
=== National career ===
Yunos joined the national representative team in 1985, replacing Ali Ismail, who had retired from football at the age of 25. He began a 15-year rivalry with the much taller goalie Ibrahim Abu Bakar, frequently trading places in the well-supported Brunei team for many years to come in the M-League.

After helping Brunei achieve a record highest position of third in 1998, Yunos lost his place to Ibrahim after Mick Jones took over from David Booth midway through the 1999 season. In the same year, the Brunei team won the Malaysia Cup which served as Yunos's opportunity to end his long career.

=== International career ===
Yunos was already playing for Brunei as early as 1981 when he donned the gloves for Brunei's under-16 team at the 1981 Lion City Cup. He was the keeper when Brunei contested and won the last ever Borneo Cup between Brunei and the state sides of Sarawak and Sabah in November 1987. He appeared in approximately six editions of the Southeast Asian Games from 1987 to 1997, losing in all but one game in the mentioned period (the one game being a 2–2 draw against Singapore at the 18th SEA Games).

However, on a brighter note, Yunos was in goal for Brunei's 1–0 victory over the Philippines at the 1996 Tiger Cup held in Singapore on 8 September. This game marked Brunei's first-ever clean sheet in an international fixture, as well as the first win for the Wasps in nine years.

== Coaching career ==
After his retirement, Yunos went into coaching for futsal, namely the national futsal team of Brunei, which featured some of his old teammates like Sabtu Lupat and Azmanuddin Gillen. His first assignment was the 2003 AFF Futsal Championship held in Malaysia. In a pulsating match against the hosts on 3 July that finished 4–5, Yunos was sent off to the stands for dissent.

Yunos replaced Rosanan Samak for the national coach position after a disastrous 2007 AFF Futsal Championship and prepared a team that won gold at the 2nd Borneo Games later in December. He then led Brunei to a fourth-place finish at the 2008 AFF Futsal Championship.

Yunos could not replicate his success at the 2013 and 2014 editions of the AFF Futsal Championship, where he lost every match. However, in his coaching comeback in the 2017 tournament, Brunei managed to win 5–0 against the Philippines.
