= Ridwan Awaludin =

Indonesian footballer

Personal information
- Full name: Muhammad Ridwan Awaludin
- Date of birth: 10 October 1992 (age 34)
- Place of birth: Bogor, Indonesia
- Height: 1.70 m (5 ft 7 in)
- Position: Midfielder

Youth career
- 2008–2010: Deportivo Indonesia

Senior career*
Years	Team	Apps	(Gls)
2010–2011	Persikabo Bogor	20	(0)
2011–2012	Persires Bali Devata	23	(1)
2012–2013	Persikabo Bogor	18	(0)
2013–2017	PS Bangka	33	(6)
2017	Persebaya Surabaya	5	(0)
2017–2018	Madura	12	(0)

International career
2007	Indonesia U-15		
2007–2008	Indonesia U-17		
2009	Indonesia U-19		
2012–2014	Indonesia U-21	6	(0)
2012–2015	Indonesia U-23	1	(0)
- * Club domestic league appearances and goals

Ridwan Awaludin (born October 10, 1992) is an Indonesian footballer who plays as a midfielder.
