= Hazwan Hamzah =

Bruneian footballer (born 1991)

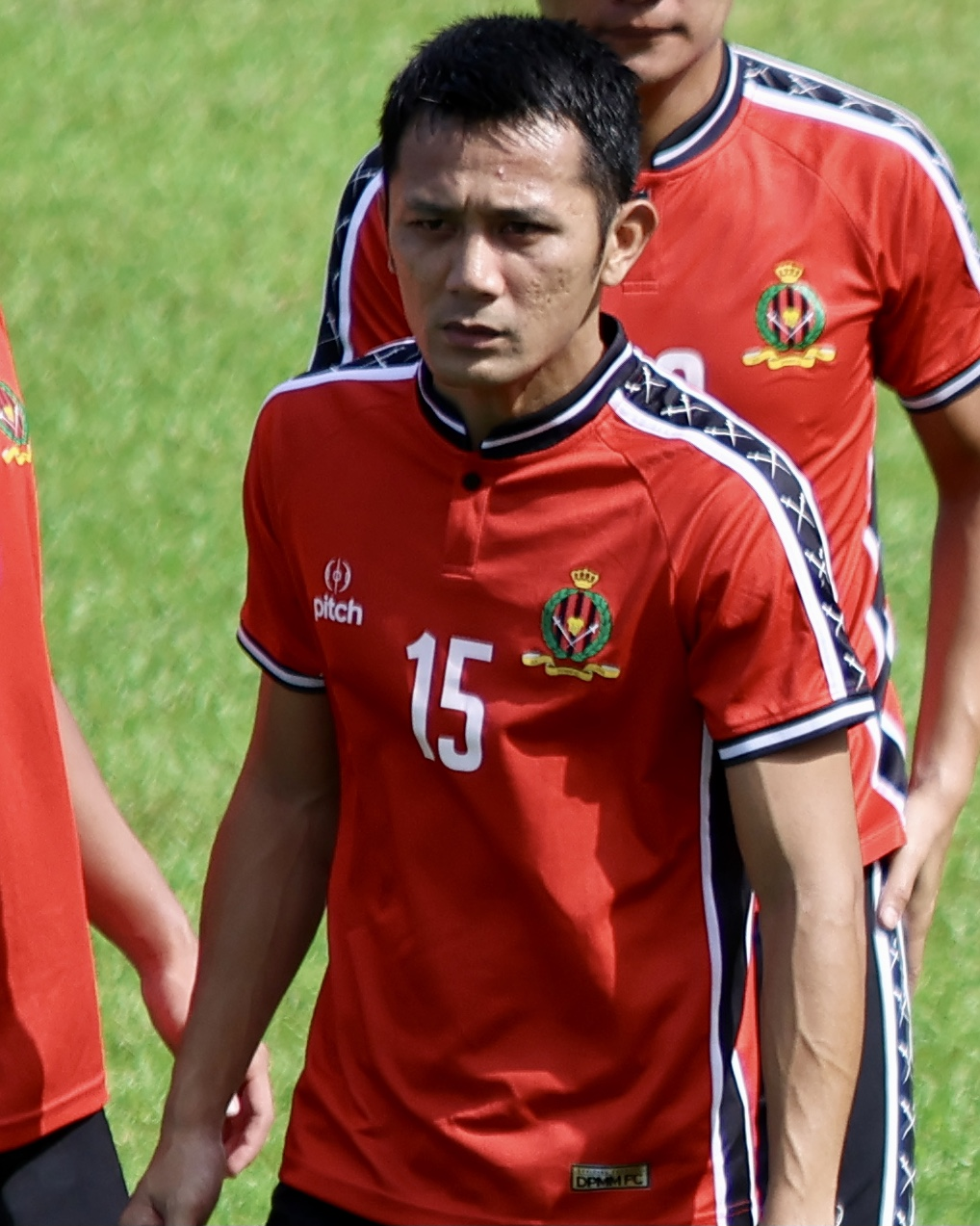
- Hazwan with DPMM in 2022

Personal information
- Full name: Hazwan bin Hamzah
- Date of birth: 9 September 1991 (age 35)
- Place of birth: Brunei
- Height: 1.68 m (5 ft 6 in)
- Position: Defender

Team information
- Current team: Kasuka
- Number: 15

Youth career
- 2006: Sports School

Senior career*
Years	Team	Apps	(Gls)
2011–2012	Rimba Star		
2014	Majra		
2014–2017	Indera		
2017	DPMM	13	(0)
2018–2019	Indera		(2)
2019–2022	DPMM	13	(0)
2023–	Kasuka	22	(0)

International career^{‡}
2012	Brunei U21	4	(0)
2013	Brunei U23	5	(0)
2015–	Brunei	10	(0)
- * Club domestic league appearances and goals as of 8 November 2026 ‡ National team caps and goals as of 17 October 2024

Hazwan bin Hamzah (born 9 September 1991) is a Bruneian footballer who plays as a defender for Kasuka FC of the Brunei Super League. He was part of the Brunei Under-21 team that won the 2012 Hassanal Bolkiah Trophy.

== Club career ==
Hazwan was a former student at Brunei's Sports School. He first started playing league football with Rimba Star FC in the 2011 Brunei Premier League II and was even made captain of the club based in Kampong Rimba.

After his involvement with the national team winded down in 2014, Hazwan joined Majra United FC at the beginning of the Super League season, then Indera SC where he won the championship. He stayed at Indera until 2017, joining Brunei's sole professional club DPMM FC after a short trial.

Hazwan made his DPMM debut in the 4–0 loss against Albirex Niigata Singapore FC on 16 June 2017 as a second-half substitute. In the game against Home United on 8 September, he was shown a second yellow card but was not immediately sent off until after two minutes elapsed when the referee was duly reminded to do so. After 13 league appearances in total, Hazwan was released after the season concluded.

Hazwan rejoined Indera SC in time for the FA Cup semi-final against Kasuka FC in March 2018. He finally won an FA Cup medal by beating MS PDB in the final by 2 goals to nil. He left the club to join DPMM for a second time in February 2019. The 2019 season was a successful one for Hazwan as he made 11 league appearances as DPMM became champions by September.

The COVID-19 pandemic forced the club to play domestically for the next two seasons. Competing in the 2022 Brunei FA Cup, Hazwan and his team managed to go all the way to the final on 4 December against Kasuka FC where they emerged 2–1 victors and secured the club's as well as his personal second FA Cup triumph.

Hazwan departed DPMM and joined Kasuka at the beginning of 2023, alongside Shah Razen Said, Abdul Aziz Tamit, Nur Asyraffahmi Norsamri and Danisyh Syariee Masrazni. The star-studded team went through the season with 16 victories in as many games, leading Hazwan to gain another Bruneian championship medal.

Kasuka went through the 2024–25 season unbeaten in 13 games, including victory in the final game against DPMM FC II at their home ground to determine the league champions. This would be Hazwan's third Brunei Super League championship medal.

After missing the entirety of 2025 with an anterior cruciate ligament injury, Hazwan returned to Kasuka in January 2026.

== International career ==
Hazwan played for Brunei under-21s at the 2012 Hassanal Bolkiah Trophy, starting in their first-ever final appearance against Indonesia and emerging as 2–0 victors. A year later, he played with roughly the same team at the 2013 SEA Games held in Myanmar where Brunei under-23 failed to gain a single point in four matches.

Hazwan made his full international debut at the 2018 World Cup qualifying First Round for AFC against Chinese Taipei at Kaohsiung, as a second-half substitute for Shahrazen Said. Brunei took home a 1–0 result courtesy of an Adi Said goal in the 36th minute. Hazwan started the second leg in place of Azwan Ali Rahman at home ground Hassanal Bolkiah National Stadium to protect the advantage but a 0-2 reverse meant that Brunei was knocked out of the 2018 World Cup.

Hazwan made two further appearances for the national team in friendlies against Singapore and Cambodia later that year. He was earmarked for the 2016 AFC Solidarity Cup held in neighbouring Malaysia but did not make the final squad.

Hazwan was part of the Brunei squad to face Timor-Leste for the 2018 AFF Suzuki Cup qualification. He started the first leg held in Kuala Lumpur on 1 September in a 3–1 loss. Seven days later in Bandar Seri Begawan, he was a late substitute for Helmi Zambin in the second leg, the match finished 1–0 to the Wasps. Brunei ultimately failed to qualify for the Suzuki Cup, losing 2–3 on aggregate.

Hazwan was selected and started the friendly match away against Laos on 27 March 2022 which resulted in a 3–2 loss for the Wasps. Two months later, he also started the friendly against Malaysia who won 4–0.

Hazwan's next appearance for the Wasps was at the 2024 ASEAN Championship qualification second leg against Timor-Leste in a 0–0 draw on 15 October of that year. This result eliminated Brunei from the 2024 ASEAN Championship on aggregate as the Timorese prevailed in the first leg 0–1 a week before.

== Honours ==
Indera

- Brunei Super League: 2014
- Piala Sumbangsih: 2015, 2018
- Brunei FA Cup: 2017–18

DPMM

- Singapore Premier League: 2019
- Brunei FA Cup: 2022

Kasuka

- Brunei Super League (2): 2023, 2024–25

Individual

- Meritorious Service Medal (PJK; 2012)
