= Daúd Gazale =

Chilean footballer (born 1984)

Personal information
- Full name: Daúd Jared Gazale Álvarez
- Date of birth: 10 August 1984 (age 42)
- Place of birth: Los Álamos, Chile
- Height: 1.81 m (5 ft 11 1/2 in)
- Position: Forward

Youth career
- 2001–2003: Huachipato
- 2003–2004: Deportes Concepción

Senior career*
Years	Team	Apps	(Gls)
2004–2008	Deportes Concepción	64	(23)
2008–2011	Colo-Colo	52	(9)
2010	→ Huachipato (loan)	30	(4)
2011–2012	Universidad Católica	15	(3)
2013	Oțelul Galați	6	(0)
2013	Dorados de Sinaloa	5	(0)
2014	Argentinos Juniors	1	(0)
2015	Nueva Chicago	7	(0)
2016	Audax Italiano	7	(0)
2017	DPMM FC	9	(2)
2018–2019	Hilal Al-Quds	–	(–)
2019	Naval	1	(0)
2020–2021	Deportes Concepción	21	(4)
2022	General Velásquez	6	(1)
2024	Lautaro de Buin	8	(0)
Total		235	(48)

International career
2008	Chile U23	4	(1)
2008–2011	Chile	8	(0)
- * Club domestic league appearances and goals

Daúd Jared Gazale Álvarez (born 10 August 1984) is a Chilean former footballer who played as a forward.

== Club career ==
=== Deportes Concepción ===
Gazale began his career in Huachipato, making his debut in that same team, but his professional debut would not be up until 2004 with Deportes Concepción.

=== Colo-Colo ===
In 2008, he signed a four-year deal with Colo-Colo. He scored his first goal with Colo-Colo on 25 June 2008 against Club de Fútbol Universidad de Chile at the stadium Tierra de Campeones in Iquique playing for the "Copa Gato".

=== Universidad Católica ===
On 17 August 2011, it was confirmed that he joined Universidad Católica as a free agent on a one-year deal. Gazale made his debut on 23 August 2011 coming on as a second-half substitute for Kevin Harbottle against O'Higgins. On 16 November 2011, he scored his first goal for Católica in the Copa Chile second leg final against Magallanes, giving the title to the club of Las Condes after sixteen years and also the qualification to the Copa Sudamericana of the next season and winning his first trophy at the team. Two days later, was confirmed his ankle injury after the game, due to a strong kick of the striker of Magallanes, David Córdova.

After 133 days without play, on 28 March of the next season, he re-appeared against Unión Española in a 2012 Copa Libertadores game, in which he scored the victory goal in the 87th minute, scoring also the following week in a 5–1 home victory over Cobreloa at San Carlos de Apoquindo.

=== FC Oțelul Galați ===
On 20 December 2012, it was confirmed that he joined Romanian Oțelul Galați as a free agent on a two-year deal. However, few months later, he terminated his contract.

=== Dorados de Sinaloa ===
On 6 September 2013, Gazale joined Ascenso MX side Dorados de Sinaloa.

=== DPMM ===
In May 2017, Gazale moved to Asia to sign for Bruneian club DPMM FC who were playing in the Singaporean S.League, replacing Billy Mehmet in the team. After nine games without a victory since June for the struggling expatriate side under Steve Kean, Gazale finally scored his first goal on 23 August which was the match winner against Hougang United. He would finish his eight-month stint in Brunei with two goals in eleven total appearances.

=== Last clubs ===
On 25 June 2019, Gazale made an appearance for Naval in the Segunda División Profesional de Chile.

In 2022, Gazale played for General Velásquez in the Segunda División Profesional de Chile. After two years, he returned to play for Lautaro de Buin in the same division. In 2025, he confirmed his retirement, aged 40.

== International career ==
The season Gazale had with Deportes Concepción earned him notice and is why Eduardo Berizzo nominated him to play for the Chile U23 that played a tournament for Under-23 players, in Malaysia.

== Post-retirement ==
In May 2025, Gazale entered the Chilean reality show Mundos Opuestos 3 (Opposite Worlds). He won the "second half" of the show, taking home a prize of 25 million Chilean pesos.

== Personal life ==
Gazale is married to Venezuelan esthetician Jeanny Santiago, with whom he started their relationship in 2019, when she was 21 years old and Gazale 35. Together they have two children. Gazale is of Palestinian descent.

He used to be Roman Catholic, but converted to Evangelical Christianity. He explained this conversion by saying:

I was Catholic, and then I became [an Evangelical] Christian [...] I started getting to know God more through the Bible, and I began experiencing powerful answers, miracles with my family, with my son. But I had to change my life, I had to change many things that [...] humanly are what we naturally desire. I'm struggling with myself so I won't fail God.

— Daúd Gazale, Opposite Worlds 3 (episode 164)

== Honours ==
=== Club ===
Colo-Colo

- Primera División de Chile (2): 2008 Clausura, 2009 Clausura

Universidad Católica

- Copa Chile: 2011

Hilal Al-Quds

- West Bank Premier League (1): 2018–19
