= Aminuddin Zakwan Tahir =

Bruneian footballer

Aminuddin Zakwan
Personal information
- Full name: Mohammad Aminuddin Zakwan bin Mohamed Tahir
- Date of birth: 24 October 1994 (age 32)
- Place of birth: Brunei
- Height: 1.62 m (5 ft 4 in)
- Position: Midfielder

Youth career
- 2007–2013: Muara Vella

Senior career*
Years	Team	Apps	(Gls)
2009–2010	Brunei Youth Team		
2012–2013	Muara Vella		
2014	Najip		(3)
2015–2017	DPMM	33	(0)
2018–2021	Indera		(5)

International career^{‡}
2011	Brunei U18		
2012–2014	Brunei U21	10	(3)
2015	Brunei U23	4	(0)
2012–2019	Brunei	6	(1)
- * Club domestic league appearances and goals as of 29 August 2022 ‡ National team caps and goals as of 3 September 2018

Mohammad Aminuddin Zakwan bin Mohamed Tahir (born 24 October 1994) is a Bruneian footballer who last played for Indera SC as a midfielder.

== Club career ==
Since 2007, Aminuddin had represented Muara Vella for club and youth level. He ended his association with the Muara side in 2014 when he joined Najip FC.

Aminuddin was added to the local contingent of the DPMM FC squad for the 2015 S.League season in February 2015 along with Reduan Petara, Yura Indera Putera and Khairul Anwar Abdul Rahim. He was the only one out of the four to give a significant contribution to his team's title-winning season, appearing 22 times mostly at right-back.

After managing only a single league appearance in 2017 (which was a 9–3 drubbing by Home United on 25 May), Aminuddin was released in the close season.

Aminuddin joined Indera SC shortly after and scored in the semi-final of the FA Cup against Kasuka FC in March 2018. He won an FA Cup medal by beating MS PDB in the final by 2 goals to nil.

Aminuddin scored his first goal for Indera on 23 November 2018 in a 3–3 draw against MS PDB. He scored a 95th-minute equaliser against the Policemen to deny them the two points.

== International career ==
Aminuddin was a regular for various youth levels before his senior national team debut against Indonesia on 26 September 2012. He was included in the squad for the 2012 AFF Suzuki Cup qualification and scored his first international goal against Cambodia in a 3–2 win, making him one of the youngest goalscorers for Brunei's senior national team.

Aminuddin also helped the Under-21s win the 2012 edition of the Hassanal Bolkiah Trophy with a 3-goal haul in the tournament. He also made 4 appearances in the 2014 HBT, although failing to defend the title.

Aminuddin was originally named for the 2016 AFC U-23 Championship qualifiers in Jakarta but pulled out at the last minute. He finally made his Under-23 bow at the 2015 SEA Games, where his team lost 0–6 to Vietnam in the first group game.

After five years away from the full national team, Aminuddin made the selection for AFF Suzuki Cup qualifying matches against Timor-Leste in early September 2018. He played the first half of the away leg in Kuala Lumpur which finished in a 3–1 loss.

== Personal life ==
Aminuddin's older brother Amir Ajmal Tahir is also a former Bruneian footballer who played as a midfielder. Since 2022, he has been residing in Vientiane, Laos as part of the diplomatic mission of Brunei to the country.

== Honours ==
Brunei DPMM

- S.League: 2015

Indera

- Brunei FA Cup: 2017–18
- Sumbangsih Cup: 2018

Brunei U21

- Hassanal Bolkiah Trophy: 2012

Individual

- Meritorious Service Medal (PJK; 2012)

== International goals ==
Goal	Date	Venue	Opponent	Score	Result	Competition
1.	9 October 2012	Yangon, Myanmar	Cambodia	1–1	3–2	2012 AFF Suzuki Cup qualification
