= 2024 ASEAN Championship qualification =

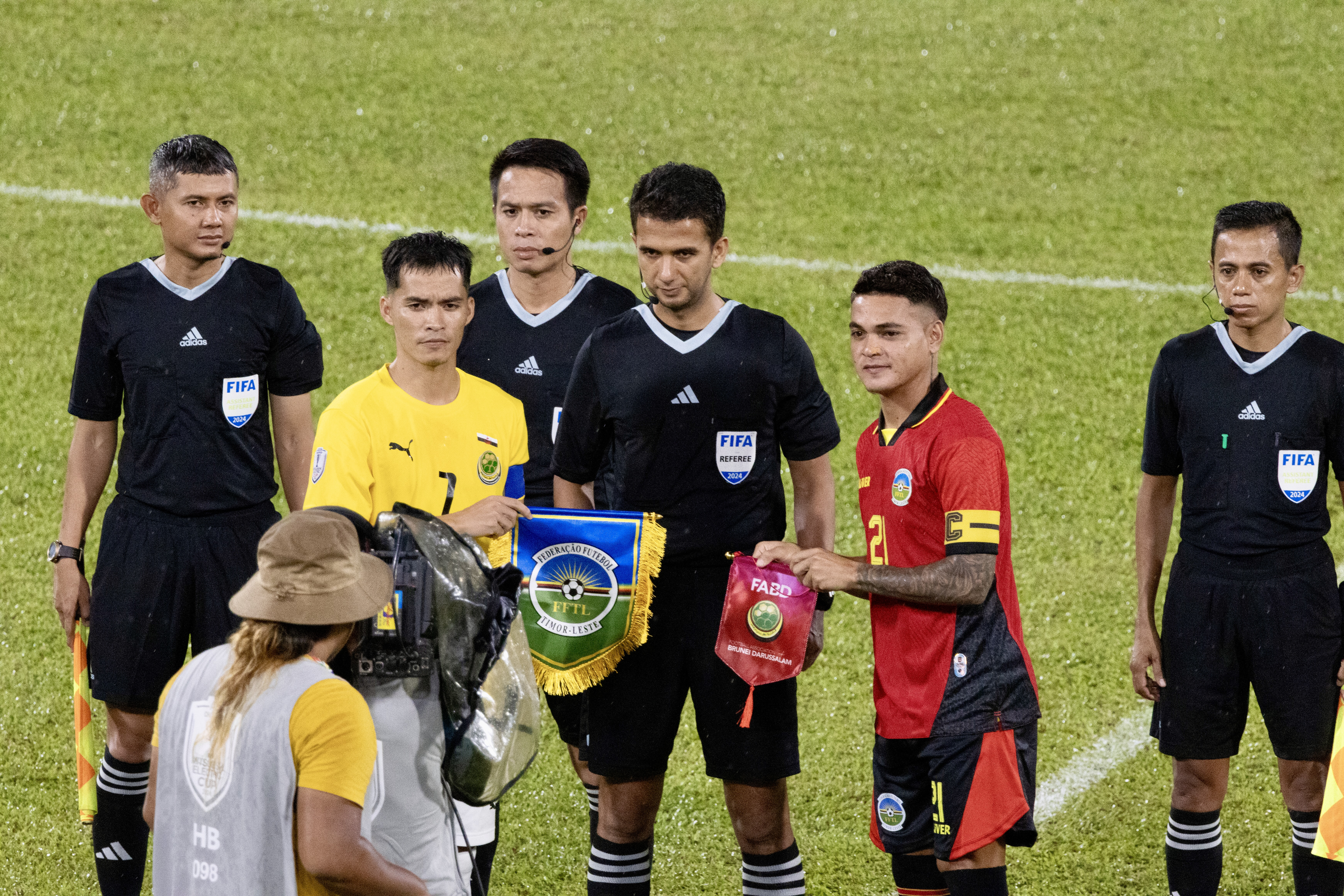
- First leg of the qualification
Brunei	Timor-Leste
(Brunei)	(Timor-Leste)
0	1
- on aggregate

First leg
Brunei	Timor-Leste
0	1
- Date: 8 October 2024
- Venue: Hassanal Bolkiah National Stadium, Bandar Seri Begawan, Brunei
- Referee: Thoriq Alkatiri (Indonesia)

Second leg
Timor-Leste	Brunei
0	0
- Date: 15 October 2024
- Venue: Chonburi Stadium, Chonburi, Thailand
- Referee: Torpong Somsing (Thailand)

The 2024 ASEAN Championship qualification tournament was the qualification process for the 2024 ASEAN Championship, the fifteenth edition of the ASEAN Championship (previously AFF Championship). Brunei and Timor-Leste contested for a berth for the ASEAN Championship final tournament in two home-and-away matches.

Timor-Leste advanced to the AFF Championship group stage and were placed in Group A after winning by 1–0 on aggregate from two qualifying matches.

== Venues ==
(Brunei) Bandar Seri Begawan	(Thailand) Chonburi
Hassanal Bolkiah National Stadium	Chonburi Stadium
Capacity: 28,000	Capacity: 8,680
2024 ASEAN Championship qualification is located in Brunei	2024 ASEAN Championship qualification is located in Thailand

== Qualification ==
=== Summary ===
Team 1	Agg.	Team 2	1st leg	2nd leg
Brunei	0–1	Timor-Leste	0–1	0–0

=== Matches ===
8 October 2024
20:30 UTC+8

Brunei	0–1	Timor-Leste
	Report (ASEAN United FC); Report (AFF)	Freitas 47'

Hassanal Bolkiah National Stadium, Bandar Seri Begawan
Attendance: 3,115
Referee: Thoriq Alkatiri (Indonesia)

Brunei	Timor-Leste

15 October 2024
19:30 UTC+7

Timor-Leste	0–0	Brunei
	Report (ASEAN United FC); Report (AFF)

Chonburi Stadium, Chonburi (Thailand)
Referee: Torpong Somsing (Thailand)

Timor-Leste	Brunei

Timor-Leste won 1–0 on aggregate and qualified for the final tournament.

== Goalscorers ==
1 goal

- (Timor-Leste) Gali Freitas
