= Reduan Petara =

Bruneian footballer

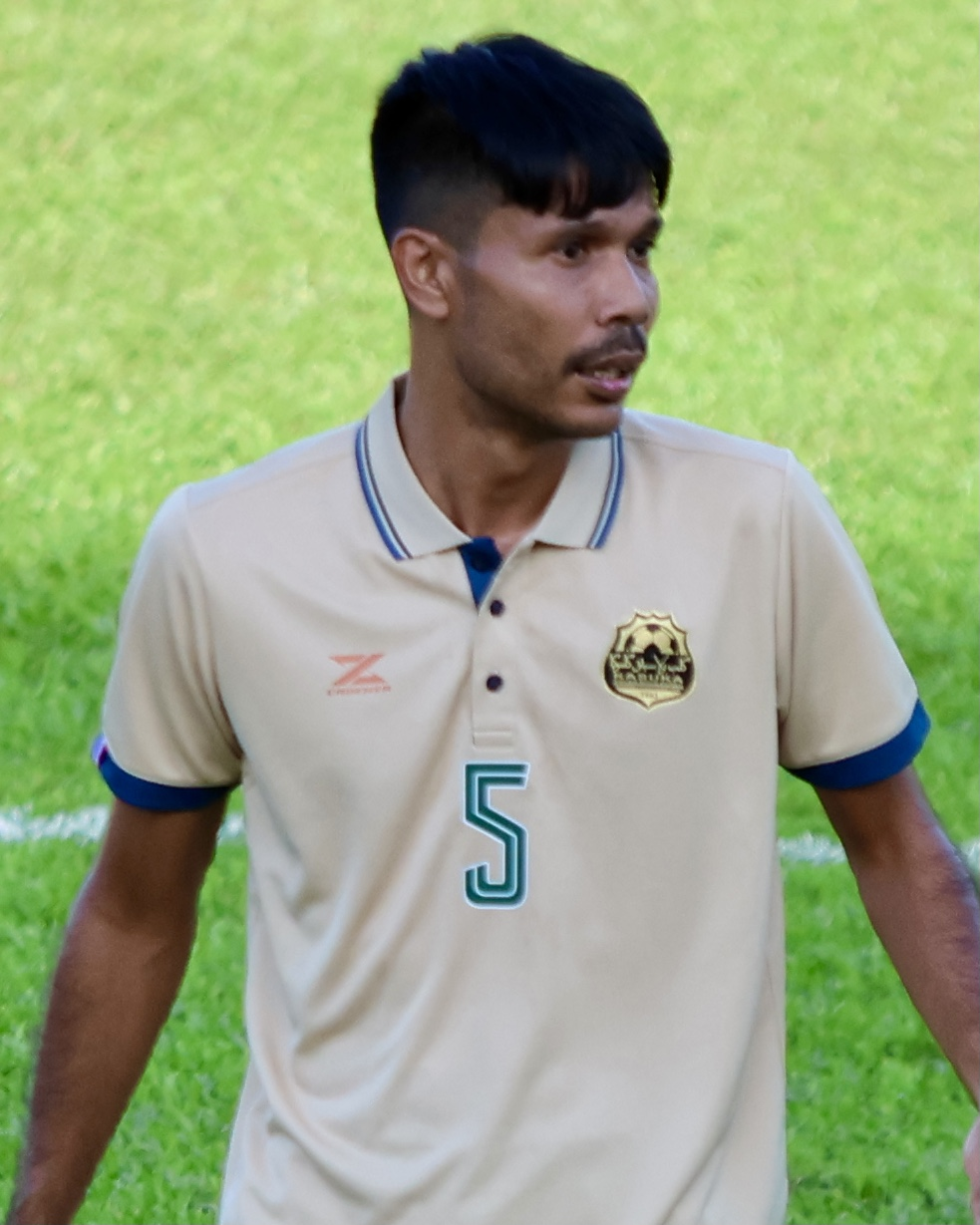
- Reduan in 2022

Personal information
- Full name: Reduan bin Haji Petara
- Date of birth: 25 May 1988 (age 38)
- Place of birth: Brunei
- Height: 1.83 m (6 ft 0 in)
- Position: Defender

Youth career
- 2007–2008: March United

Senior career*
Years	Team	Apps	(Gls)
2009–2011	AM Gunners		
2012–2014	Indera		(9)
2015–2018	DPMM	14	(0)
2019–2023	Kasuka		(3)

International career^{‡}
2007–2014	Brunei U21	10	(1)
2011	Brunei U23	3	(1)
2012–2018	Brunei	6	(0)
- * Club domestic league appearances and goals as of 16 January 2025 ‡ National team caps and goals as of 9 August 2019

Reduan bin Haji Petara (born 25 May 1988) is a Bruneian retired footballer who played as a defender.

== Club career ==
Reduan started playing club football with the youth team of March United. He transferred to AM Gunners of the Brunei Premier League in 2009, his defensive displays helped his club to finish third. After AM Gunners disbanded, he joined Indera SC and won the newly-formed Brunei Super League twice in a row.

Reduan signed with Brunei's professional club DPMM FC at the start of the 2015 S.League season. He only appeared twice in his debut season as DPMM won the S.League championship for the first time.

After 14 appearances in four seasons for the side, Reduan was released by DPMM in the 2018 close season. He joined Kasuka FC since then and scored a hat-trick in a 5–0 win over Lun Bawang FC on 24 February.

In 2022, Reduan went all the way with Kasuka to the final of the 2022 Brunei FA Cup where they were beaten 2–1 by his former club DPMM FC on 4 December. The following year, he tasted league success again with Kasuka, winning the 2023 Brunei Super League.

== International career ==
Reduan played in three editions of the Hassanal Bolkiah Trophy for the Brunei under-21s. His first tournament was in 2007 where he started in all three of Brunei's games. His second was in 2012 when the hosts won the trophy for the first time, though he was overlooked in the final match for Hazwan Hamzah. He returned as one of the five permitted overage players for the 2014 edition for an unsuccessful defence of the trophy. He played for the under-23s at the 2011 SEA Games, scoring the winner against Philippines in the group stage.

Reduan's full international debut for the Wasps came on 26 September 2012 in a friendly against Indonesia. He made further appearances at the 2014 AFF Suzuki Cup qualifying round and the 2018 World Cup qualifying first round for AFC.

Reduan was included in the squad for the 2018 AFF Suzuki Cup qualification match against Timor-Leste on 1 September 2018, but did not see any playing time. He was replaced by Hanif Hamir before the second leg at Bandar Seri Begawan.

== Honours ==
=== Team ===
Indera SC

- Brunei Super League: 2012–13, 2014

DPMM FC

- S.League: 2015

Kasuka FC

- Brunei Super League: 2023

=== International ===
Brunei national under-21 football team

- Hassanal Bolkiah Trophy: 2012

=== Individual ===
- Meritorious Service Medal (PJK; 2012)
