= Amin Sisa =

Bruneian footballer (born 1998)

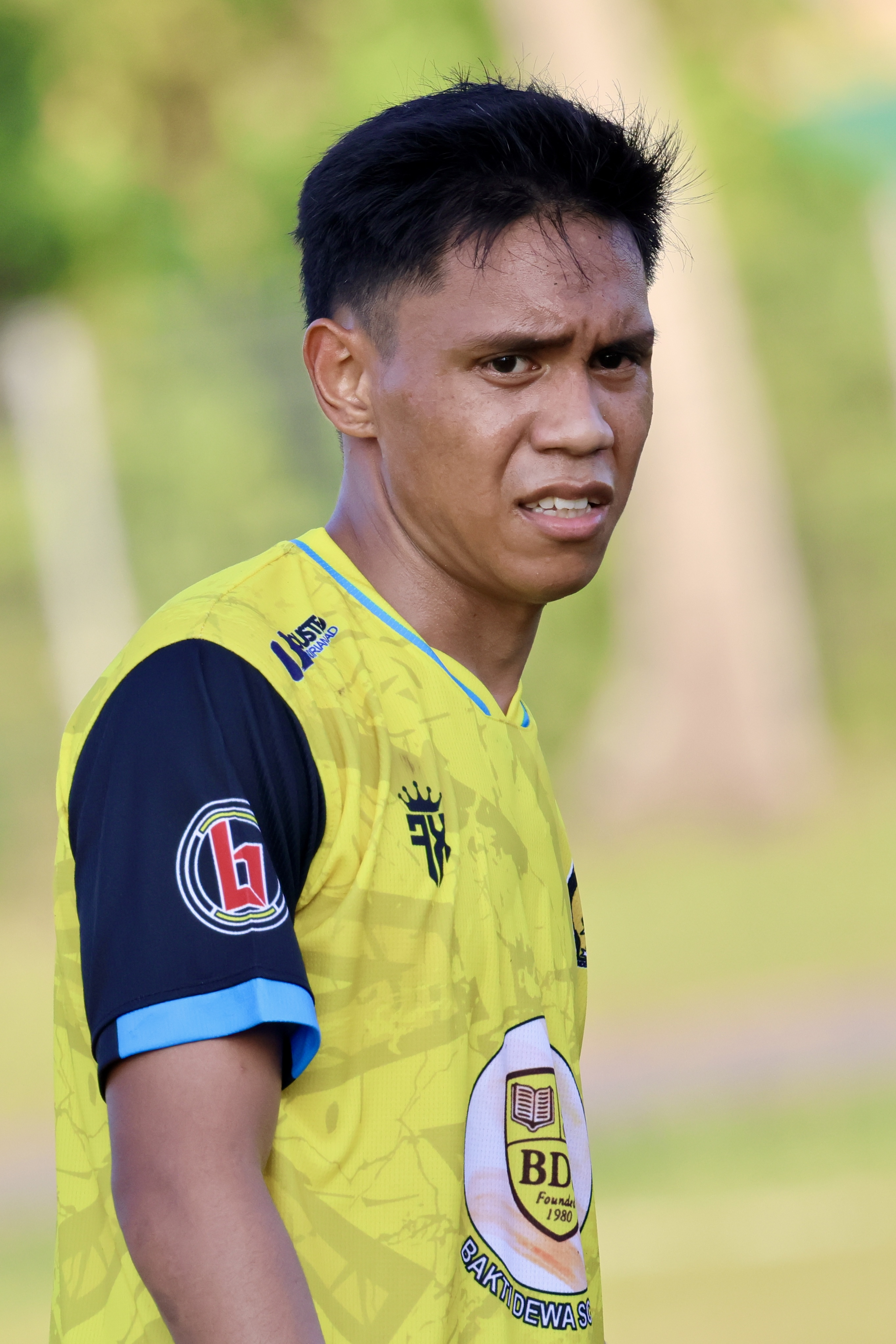
- Amin with Indera in 2024

Personal information
- Full name: Mohammad Amin bin Haji Sisa
- Date of birth: 2 January 1998 (age 28)
- Place of birth: Brunei
- Position: Midfielder

Team information
- Current team: Indera SC
- Number: 9

Youth career
- Sports School

Senior career*
Years	Team	Apps	(Gls)
2015–2016	Tabuan Muda		(1)
2017–2019	Kasuka		(1)
2020–	Indera	26	(11)

International career^{‡}
2013	Brunei U16	4	(0)
2015	Brunei U19	4	(0)
2017–2019	Brunei U23	5	(0)
2018	Brunei U21	2	(0)
2017–	Brunei	5	(0)
- * Club domestic league appearances and goals as of 15 September 2026 ‡ National team caps and goals as of 21 October 2025

Mohammad Amin bin Haji Sisa (born 2 January 1998) is a Bruneian footballer who plays as a midfielder for Indera SC of the Brunei Super League and the Brunei national football team.

== Club career ==
Amin attended Brunei's Sports School as a youngster. From 2015 to 2016, Amin was a squad member of the league team of the Brunei under-23s namely Tabuan Muda, and played with the likes of Abdul Khair Basri, Khairil Shahme Suhaimi and Shafie Effendy. He scored his first league goal in a 2–2 draw with Lun Bawang FC on 20 September 2015. He then moved to Kasuka FC in 2017, but failed to regularly hold a place in the star-studded team in 2018–19 that came second behind MS ABDB in the league table.

Amin moved to Indera SC at the start of 2020, and made his competitive debut at the second leg of the 2020 AFC Cup qualifying round which was a 3–1 defeat to Yangon United in Yangon, Myanmar on 29 January. He then scored against his former club in his second league appearance in a 2–4 loss to Kasuka on 7 March. It would be the last round of the 2020 Brunei Super League as the COVID-19 pandemic gripped the nation days after, forcing the cancellation of the league.

Amin played regularly throughout the following campaigns for Indera, contributing to his team's second-place finish in the 2023 Brunei Super League.

On 28 September 2025, Amin scored four goals against league newcomers Hawa FC in a 0–14 win. He also scored in the next BSL fixture against Rimba Star which finished 2–1 to Indera. A brace against Lun Bawang and a strike versus Wijaya meant that Amin continued his goalscoring form in his club's November fixtures. His goals from midfield served as a major factor in Indera's league campaign whereby victory in their final fixture against Kasuka would crown them champions in a title decider on 19 April, and they bettered the previous league winners 3–2 on the night.

== International career ==
=== Youth ===
Amin was a Brunei youth international from 2013 to 2019, his first tournament for the Young Wasps was the 2014 AFC U-16 Championship qualification round that was held in Laos in September 2013. Marking the start of Stephen Ng Heng Seng's coaching stint in Brunei, the Young Wasps cruised to a 4–1 victory over Guam in the first game with Amin starting the match. He made four appearances out of four games as Brunei finished fourth in the group.

Two years later, Amin was selected for the 2015 AFF U-19 Youth Championship as part of Tabuan Muda in August of that year. He made four appearances for Brunei U19 in as many games, all ending in defeats.

In 2017, Amin was part of the Brunei under-23 squad that competed at the 2018 AFC U-23 Championship qualifying round held in Myanmar. After failing to appear in any of the games, he was axed from the squad for the 29th SEA Games the following month, making way for Yura Indera Putera Yunos.

The following year, Brunei hosted the 2018 Hassanal Bolkiah Trophy for under-21 teams in Southeast Asia from April to May. Amin was selected to play for the host nation and took the field from the start in the matches against Timor-Leste and Thailand. Ultimately, Brunei failed to progress to the knockout stages after a 0–1 loss to Myanmar in their final group game where Amin was replaced by Nur Ikhmal Damit in the starting lineup.

Amin was back in the Tabuan Muda fold in 2019, appearing for the under-23s at the 2020 AFC U-23 Championship qualification matches held in Vietnam in March, followed by a long-awaited participation of the 30th SEA Games near the end of the year. He played a total of 5 games for Brunei U23.

=== Senior ===
Amin had his first callup to the senior national team at the 2017 Aceh World Solidarity Tsunami Cup held in Banda Aceh, Indonesia on 2–6 December. He made his unofficial debut for the Wasps as a last-minute substitute in a 4–0 loss to hosts Indonesia U23 in the first game.

Amin's next involvement with the senior side was at the 2022 World Cup qualification, a two-legged affair with Mongolia in June 2019. He was not utilised by Robbie Servais as the Wasps were eliminated from the World Cup and also the 2023 Asian Cup 2–3 on aggregate.

After having been selected for national team training camps in 2020, Amin subsequently missed out on representing Brunei at the 2022 AFF Mitsubishi Electric Cup and also the 2026 World Cup qualifying fixtures against Indonesia. He was then restored to the squad at the 2024 FIFA Series held in Jeddah, Saudi Arabia in March of that year where he finally gained his first international cap against Bermuda in a 2–0 defeat.

Amin's next appearance for the Wasps was away against Russia on 15 November 2024 as a second-half substitute. The game finished an 11–0 drubbing of Brunei by their hosts.

Amin kept his place in the national team squad when they were up against Lebanon on 25 March 2025 at the 2027 AFC Asian Cup qualifying first group match. He took the field in the final minutes of the game where the Cedars prevailed 5–0.

In October 2025, Amin was in the Brunei team that faced Yemen for two matches at the abovementioned Asian Cup qualifying. He was a surprise starter at the second Yemen match on 14 October in Kuwait, where Brunei were trounced 9–0.

== Honours ==
Kasuka FC

- Brunei Super League: 2018–19 (runners-up)

Indera SC

- Brunei Super League: 2023 (runners-up), 2025–26
