= Amirul Hakeem Kasim =

Bruneian footballer (born 1990)

Amirul Hakeem
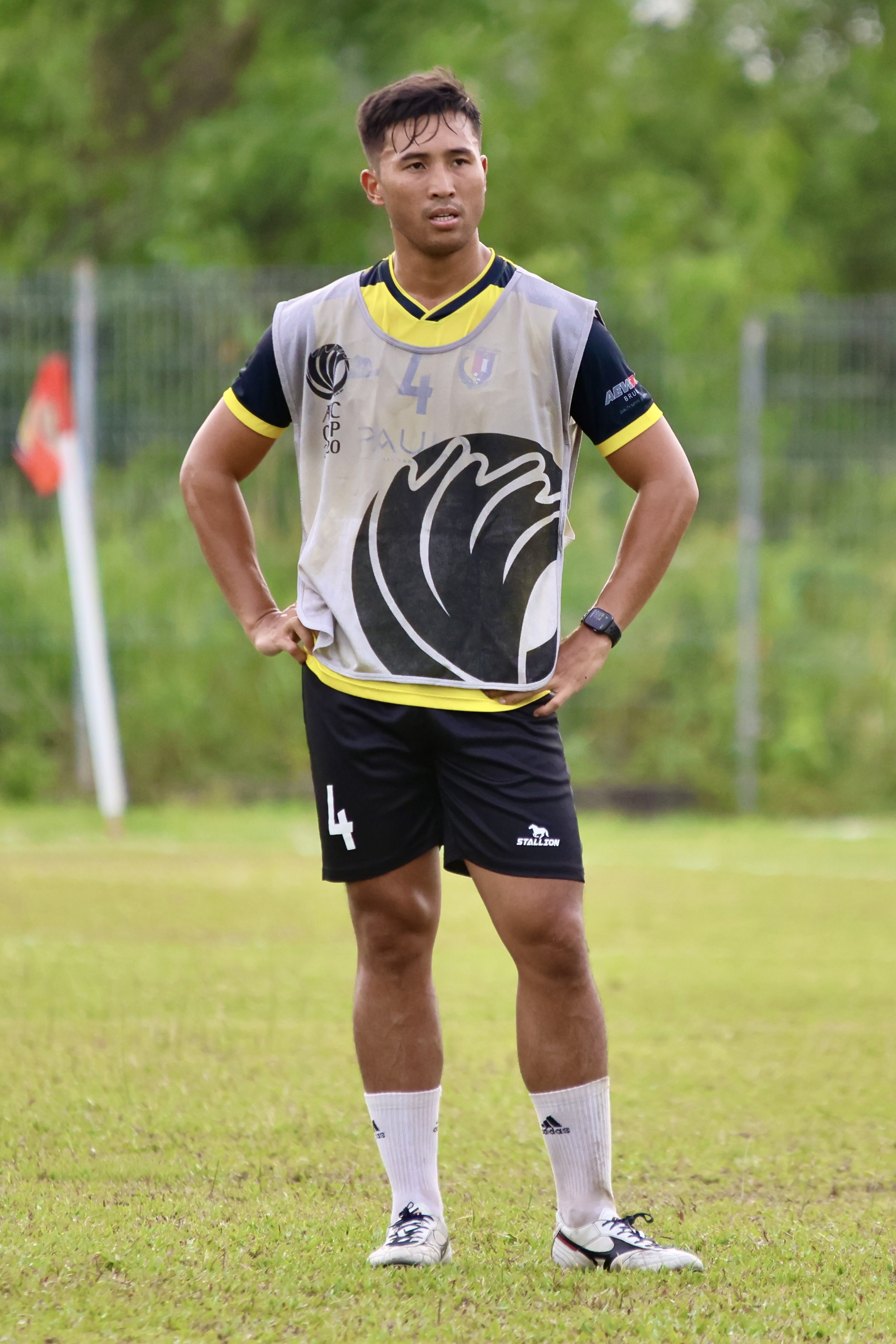
- Hakeem with Indera in 2023

Personal information
- Full name: Amirul Hakeem bin Haji Kasim
- Date of birth: 18 March 1990 (age 36)
- Place of birth: Brunei
- Position: Defender

Senior career*
Years	Team	Apps	(Gls)
2007–2014	Jerudong		
2016–2017	Najip I-Team		(1)
2017–2024	Indera		(3)

International career
2022	Brunei	2	(0)
- * Club domestic league appearances and goals

Amirul Hakeem bin Haji Kasim (born 18 March 1990) is a Bruneian former footballer who played as a defender.

== Club career ==
Hakeem began his footballing career at Jerudong FC from 2007 where he played alongside future DPMM FC star Azwan Ali Rahman. The club finished fourth in successive seasons with Hakeem as their first choice centre-back. He also helped Jerudong qualify for the inaugural 2012–13 Brunei Super League by finishing second behind QAF FC in their group at the 2011–12 Brunei National Football League.

Hakeem left Jerudong in 2015 and signed for Najip I-Team a year later for the 2016 season. He played a part in Najip I-Team's fourth-place finish in the league and reached the final of that year's FA Cup, losing to league champions MS ABDB in the final by a single goal courtesy of Baharin Hamidon. He scored his first goal for Najip against Kota Ranger FC in a 4–2 victory on 9 April.

In the middle of 2017, Hakeem transferred to Indera SC to replace the departed Hazwan Hamzah. He scored his first goal for Indera against his old club Jerudong FC in a 7–0 win on 16 December of that year. He reached the FA Cup final again on his second attempt and this time emerged victorious against MS PDB after a 2–0 win with goals from Asri Aspar and Zulkhairy Razali. Additionally, he scored the winner in the following Brunei Super Cup match against league champions MS ABDB on 19 October 2018.

Hakeem took over from Khairil Shahme Suhaimi to become captain of Indera at the start of the 2022 season. He quietly exited the team in the 2024–25 season.

== International career ==
Hakeem was called up to the national squad in the away friendly against Laos on 27 March 2022. He made his international debut as a substitute in the game, playing the final seven minutes in a 3–2 loss. He was recalled to the side for another friendly against Malaysia exactly two months later in Kuala Lumpur and similarly came on in the second half. He conceded a penalty for a foul on Akhyar Rashid to condemn the Wasps to a 4–0 defeat.

== Personal life ==
Hakeem works as a government employee at the Ministry of Home Affairs in Brunei.

== Honours ==
Indera SC

- Brunei FA Cup: 2017–18
- Sumbangsih Cup: 2018
