= 2025 Brunei FA Cup =

Tournament details
- Country: Brunei
- Dates: 14 February 2025 – 18 May 2025
- Teams: 12

Final positions
- Champions: DPMM FC II
- Runners-up: Indera SC

Tournament statistics
- Matches played: 24
- Goals scored: 97 (4.04 per match)
- Top goal scorer: (credited to Matías Hernández)

The 2025 Brunei FA Cup was the 14th edition of the Brunei FA Cup. A record low of 12 teams will enter the competition that ran from February to May 2025 by the Football Association of Brunei Darussalam.

On 18 May 2025, the second team of DPMM FC became the winners of the competition after a 1–0 victory over Indera SC.

== Competition format ==
12 teams were divided into four groups of three and will only play against each other once. The top two teams from each group will advance to the knockout stage, where a home-and-away format will be introduced. A third-place match will be held for the beaten semi-finalists.

== Participating teams ==
from Brunei Super League

- DPMM FC II
- Indera SC
- Kasuka FC
- KB FC
- Kota Ranger FC
- MS ABDB
- MS PPDB
- ~~Panchor Murai FC~~ (withdrew)
- Rimba Star FC
- Wijaya FC

from District Leagues

- Dagang FT
- PKT FT

== Group stage ==
=== Group A ===
Pos	Team	Pld	W	D	L	GF	GA	GD	Pts	Qualification or relegation
1	Kasuka FC	2	2	0	0	16	1	+15	6	Qualification to knockout stage
2	MS PPDB	2	1	0	1	6	1	+5	3	Qualification to knockout stage
3	Dagang FT	2	0	0	2	1	21	−20	0	

Source: FABD
14 February 2025
20:15 UTC+8

Kasuka	1–0	PPDB
Own goal 42' (o.g.)	Report

Berakas Sports Complex, Jaya Setia
Referee: Rozyman Aidit Ibrahim
21 February 2025
20:15 UTC+8

Dagang	1–15	Kasuka
Amni 60'		Willian 1', 21', 43'; Adi 2', 12', 73'; Asri 24', 34', 63'; Wardun 31' (pen.); Maududi 42'; Alinur 48'; Asyraffahmi 51', 65'; Hirzi 69'

Track and Field Sports Complex, Bandar Seri Begawan
Referee: Azlan Jali
13 April 2025
16:00 UTC+8

PPDB	6–0	Dagang
	Report

Hassanal Bolkiah Mini Stadium, Tungku

=== Group B ===
Pos	Team	Pld	W	D	L	GF	GA	GD	Pts	Qualification or relegation
1	Indera SC	1	1	0	0	3	1	+2	3	Qualification to knockout stage
2	Wijaya FC	1	0	0	1	1	3	−2	0	Qualification to knockout stage
3	Panchor Murai FC	0	0	0	0	0	0	0	0	Withdrew

Source: FABD
11 April 2025
20:15 UTC+8

Indera	3–1	Wijaya
Hendra 20', 60'; Abiodun	Report	Aman 56' (pen.)

Berakas Sports Complex, Jaya Setia

=== Group C ===
Pos	Team	Pld	W	D	L	GF	GA	GD	Pts	Qualification or relegation
1	Kota Ranger FC	2	1	1	0	6	2	+4	4	Qualification to knockout stage
2	Kuala Belait FC	2	0	2	0	4	4	0	2	Qualification to knockout stage
3	Rimba Star FC	2	0	1	1	2	6	−4	1	

Source: FABD
25 February 2025
20:15 UTC+8

KB	2–2	Kota Ranger
Shahrul Izzan; Hafiy	Report	El-Sayed

Track and Field Sports Complex, Bandar Seri Begawan
9 April 2025
20:15 UTC+8

Kota Ranger	4–0	Rimba Star
Hazmi 12', 24'; Safwan 20'; Aminuddin 86'	Report

Berakas Sports Complex, Jaya Setia
Referee: Noorhasni Omar
20 April 2025
16:00 UTC+8

Rimba Star	2–2	KB

Tutong Sports Complex, Tutong

=== Group D ===
Pos	Team	Pld	W	D	L	GF	GA	GD	Pts	Qualification or relegation
1	DPMM FC II	2	2	0	0	13	0	+13	6	Qualification to knockout stage
2	MS ABDB	2	1	0	1	7	1	+6	3	Qualification to knockout stage
3	PKT FT	2	0	0	2	0	19	−19	0	

Source: FABD
19 February 2025
20:15 UTC+8

DPMM II	1–0	ABDB
Marcelo 90'

Jerudong Park Mini Stadium, Jerudong
6 April 2025
16:00 UTC+8

PKT	0–12	DPMM II
	Report	Azizi 4'; Kholil 8', 33'; Mendi 25', 44'; Uneo 60', 79'; Shah Razen 58', 78', 81'; Hernández 86', 87'

Jerudong Park Mini Stadium, Jerudong
Referee: Noorhasni Omar
13 April 2025
16:00 UTC+8

ABDB	7–0	PKT
Shafie 9', 82'; Rahimin 13'; Ali 43', 52'; Muqaddim 67'; Waiz 85'	Report

FABD Artificial Field, Bandar Seri Begawan
Referee: Azrul Ariffin Metussin

== Knockout stage ==
=== Bracket ===
Quarter-finals
Kasuka FC	8	4	12
Wijaya FC	0	0	0
KB FC	1	0	1
DPMM FC II	6	5	11
Kota Ranger FC	0	1	1
MS ABDB	2	1	3
MS PPDB	0	1	1
Indera SC	2	4	6

Semi-finals
Kasuka FC	0	0	0
DPMM FC II	0	2	2
MS ABDB	1	2	3
Indera SC	3	4	7

Final
DPMM FC II	1
Indera SC	0
Third place playoff
Kasuka FC	2 (3)
MS ABDB (p)	2 (4)

=== Quarter-finals ===
Team 1	Agg.	Team 2	1st leg	2nd leg
Kasuka FC	12–0	Wijaya FC	8–0	4–0
MS PPDB	1–6	Indera SC	0–2	1–4
Kota Ranger FC	1–3	MS ABDB	0–2	1–1
KB FC	1–11	DPMM FC II	1–6	0–5

==== First leg ====
18 April 2025
20:15 UTC+8

Kasuka	8–0	Wijaya

Berakas Sports Complex, Berakas

20 April 2025
16:00 UTC+8

PPDB	0–2	Indera
	Report	Aimmil; Kashim

Hassanal Bolkiah Mini Stadium, Tungku

25 April 2025
20:15 UTC+8

Kota Ranger	0–2	ABDB
		Azim (o.g.); Safaruddin

Berakas Sports Complex, Jaya Setia

25 April 2025
20:15 UTC+8

KB	1–6	DPMM II
Danish Bazli 90+3'	Report	Mendi 12', 90+2'; Hernández 45+1'; Haziq 53'; Kholil 60'; Uneo 90'

Track and Field Sports Complex, Bandar Seri Begawan
Referee: Azrul Ariffin Metussin

==== Second leg ====
26 April 2025
20:15 UTC+8

Wijaya	0–4	Kasuka
	Report

Berakas Sports Complex, Jaya Setia

29 April 2025
20:15 UTC+8

DPMM II	5–0	KB
Marcelo 3'; Mendi 17'; Safwan 33'; Haziq 80'; Azizi 88'	Report

Track and Field Sports Complex, Bandar Seri Begawan

30 April 2025
20:15 UTC+8

ABDB	1–1	Kota Ranger
Hadif 30'		Sholihuddin 3'

Track and Field Sports Complex, Bandar Seri Begawan
Referee: Noorhasni Omar

2 May 2025
20:15 UTC+8

Indera	4–1	PPDB
Taylor 7'; Kashim 18' (pen.); Aimmil 74'	Report

Berakas Sports Complex, Jaya Setia

=== Semi-finals ===
Team 1	Agg.	Team 2	1st leg	2nd leg
Kasuka FC	0–2	DPMM II	0–0	0–2
MS ABDB	3–7	Indera SC	1–3	2–4

==== First leg ====
6 May 2025
20:15 UTC+8

Kasuka	0–0	DPMM II
	Report

Hassanal Bolkiah National Stadium, Bandar Seri Begawan

7 May 2025
20:15 UTC+8

ABDB	1–3	Indera
Shafie 82'	Report	Taylor 21', 77'; Kashim 49'

Hassanal Bolkiah National Stadium, Bandar Seri Begawan
Referee: Adib Suimi

==== Second leg ====
11 May 2025
20:15 UTC+8

DPMM II	2–0	Kasuka
Mendi 1'; Haziq 36'

Hassanal Bolkiah National Stadium, Bandar Seri Begawan

11 May 2025
20:15 UTC+8

Indera	4–2	ABDB
Kashim 35', 68'; Khair 59'; Aimmil 83'		Shafie 74', 86'

Berakas Sports Complex, Jaya Setia
Referee: Noorhasni Omar

=== Third place play-off ===
16 May 2025
20:15 UTC+8

Kasuka	2–2	ABDB
Alinur 41'; Asri 71'	Report	Hibatur 78'; Saiful Ammar 85'
Penalties
Willian (penalty scored); Tasaka (penalty scored); Khairil (penalty missed); Asyraf (penalty scored); Adi (penalty missed)	3–4	Hadif (penalty missed); Shafie (penalty scored); Hibatur (penalty scored); Alimuddin (penalty scored); Saiful Ammar (penalty scored)

Track and Field Sports Complex, Bandar Seri Begawan
Attendance: 300
Referee: Azlan Jali

=== Final ===
18 May 2025
20:15 UTC+8

DPMM II	1–0	Indera
Hernández 73'	Report

Hassanal Bolkiah National Stadium, Bandar Seri Begawan
Referee: Rozyman Aidit Ibrahim

DPMM FC
Indera SC

DPMM:
GK	23	Jefri Syafiq Ishak
DF	14	Martin Haddy Khallidden
DF	3	Marcelo Junior (c)
DF	4	Azrin Danial Yusra
MF	19	Akram Waqeel Bakri	(substituted off) 70'
MF	21	Matías Hernández	(substituted off) 86'
MF	8	Faris Fadillah Saiful Bahari
MF	18	Kenshin Uneo
MF	24	Haziq Naqiuddin Syamra
FW	7	Sergio Mendigutxia	(yellow card) 50'
FW	10	Abdul Azizi Ali Rahman	(substituted off) 79'
Substitutes:
GK	12	Abdul Azeez Elyas
DF	2	Danish Firdaus Roddy Suhardy
DF	16	Irfan Abdullah Ikhwan Chin
MF	11	Hadi Aiman Hamizal	(substituted on) 70'
MF	15	Safwan Zawawi Sazalee	(substituted on) 79' (yellow card) 90'
MF	17	Abdul Muntaqim Al-Muhtadee Billah
FW	20	Al-Kholil Sapawi	(substituted on) 86'
Coach:
(Brunei) Helme Panjang

Kasuka:
GK	22	Ahsanuddin Dani
CB	20	Babatunde Abiodun
CB	13	Amirul Aizad Zaidi
LB	23	Ridhwan Nokman
RB	16	Abdul Aziz Hassan
MF	17	Abdul Khair Basri (c)
MF	28	Hendra Azam Idris
MF	24	Hamizan Aziz Sulaiman	(yellow card) 18' (substituted off) 21'
MF	10	Petrus Jumat
FW	14	Leon Sullivan Taylor	(yellow card) 49'
FW	12	Elisha Kashim
Substitutes:
GK	25	Nazirul Fikri Sahrizul
GK	30	Khairul Ikhwan Abdul Razak
DF	3	Danish Aiman Sahrizul
DF	15	Yazid Azmi
MF	21	Aimmil Rahman Ramlee	(substituted on) 21'
FW	11	Izzat Haziq Husli
FW	29	Azhari Danial Yusra
Coach:
(Malaysia) Raja Isa
