= Asri Aspar =

Bruneian footballer

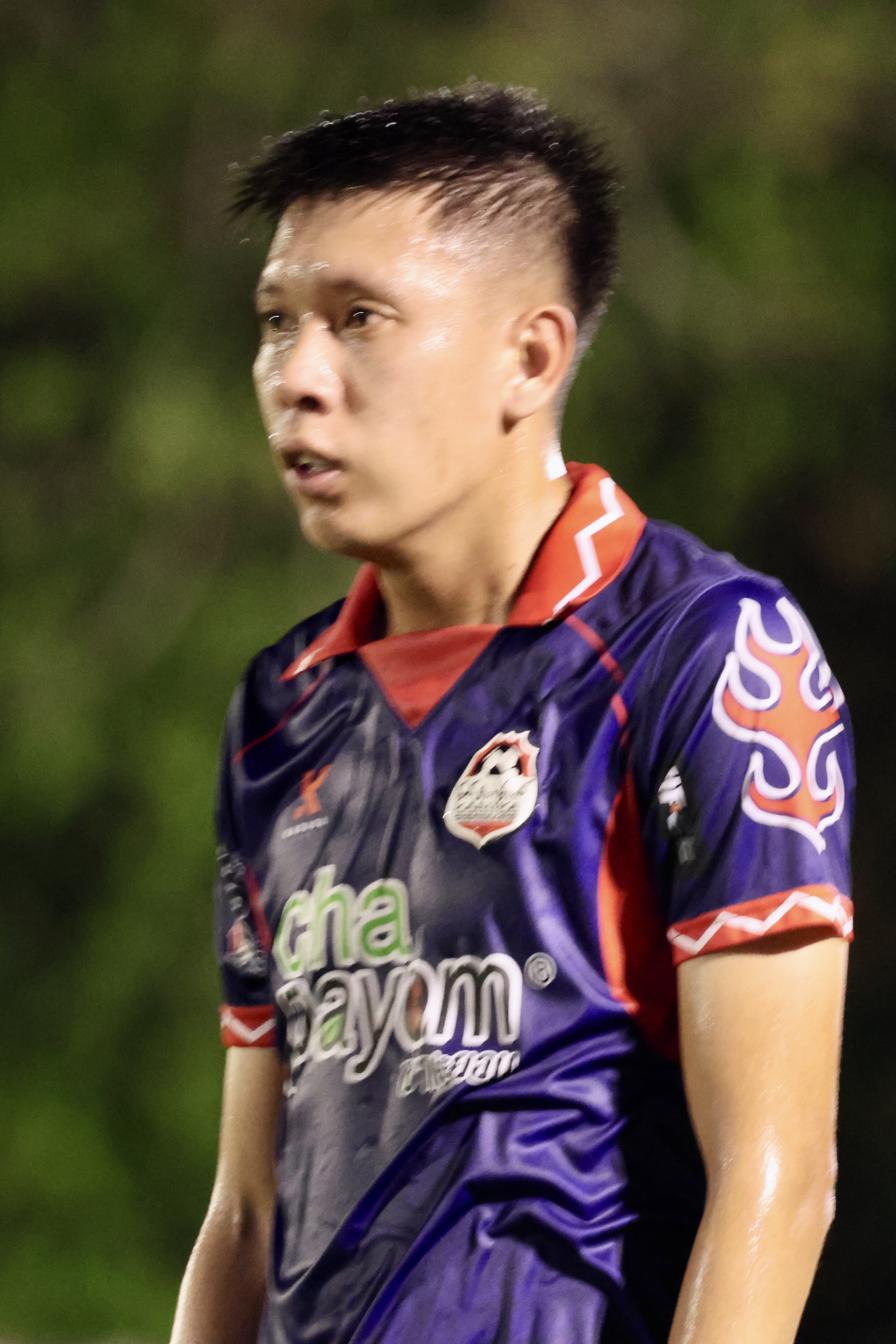
- Asri with Kasuka in 2024

Personal information
- Full name: Muhammad Asri bin Haji Aspar
- Date of birth: 17 January 1996 (age 30)
- Place of birth: Bandar Seri Begawan, Brunei
- Height: 1.67 m (5 ft 6 in)
- Position: Midfielder

Team information
- Current team: Kasuka
- Number: 7

Youth career
- –2013: Sports School
- 2012–2013: Muara Vella
- 2013: Al-Idrus

Senior career*
| Years | Team | Apps | (Gls) |
| 2014–2020 | Indera | | (48) |
| 2020– | Kasuka | 24 | (18) |

International career^{‡}
| 2013 | Brunei U19 | 3 | (1) |
| 2014 | Brunei U21 | 3 | (0) |
| 2013 | Brunei U23 | 3 | (0) |
| 2019– | Brunei | 2 | (0) |
- * Club domestic league appearances and goals as of 18 November 2026 ‡ National team caps and goals as of 1 June 2025

Muhammad Asri bin Haji Aspar (born 17 January 1996) is a Bruneian footballer who plays as a midfielder for Brunei Super League club Kasuka.

== Club career ==
Asri was a student of Brunei Sports School while playing for the youth clubs of Muara Vella and afterwards Al-Idrus. He signed for Indera in 2014 and scored nine goals, including the opener in a crucial 2–0 win against closest rivals MS ABDB, to help his club be champions of the 2014 Brunei Super League.

On 1 April 2018, Asri scored in the final of the 2017-18 Brunei FA Cup against MS PDB to lift the trophy for the first time.

Asri transferred to Kasuka when the 2020 Brunei Super League began. He scored on his debut in a 5–0 victory against Kuala Belait on 1 March.

Asri played a part at Kasuka's impressive campaign at the 2022 Brunei FA Cup, finishing as runners-up to DPMM. He made a handful of appearances in his club's run to the league championship in 2023.

Asri played in the 2024–25 season, scoring seven goals in 10 appearances. The team won the championship title for the second consecutive time.

== International career ==
Asri's first involvement with the Brunei national team set-up was the 2014 AFC U-19 Championship qualification matches held in Bangkok, Thailand in October 2013 where Brunei under-19 lost all three matches. In the final fixture, Asri opened the scoring against Singapore before succumbing to a 3–1 loss.

Asri was immediately integrated into the Brunei under-23 squad to compete for the 27th SEA Games held in Myanmar in December 2013. Asri made his debut as a substitute against Indonesia U23 at the Maguwoharjo Stadium on 15 August in a 1–0 loss. He subsequently made two substitute appearances against Singapore and Laos. Brunei came last in their group with zero wins in four.

Asri was selected for the Brunei under-21s at the 2014 Hassanal Bolkiah Trophy. He played in three of the five group stage matches where Brunei failed to progress to the knockout phase by virtue of goal difference.

After a commendable 2018-19 Brunei Super League season for Indera SC, Asri was selected by Robbie Servais to play for the full national team to face Mongolia in the 2022 FIFA World Cup qualification matches over two legs, to be played in June 2019. Asri made his international debut for the Wasps in the final minute of additional time in the second leg, which Brunei won 2–1. The victory was not enough to put the Wasps through to Round 2 of the qualification process for the 2022 FIFA World Cup and the 2023 AFC Asian Cup due to the aggregate 2–3 loss.

Asri returned to the national team setup after being selected for an away friendly fixture against Russia in November 2024, taking place in Krasnodar and becoming Brunei's first opponent from UEFA. The game ended 11–0 to the home side with Asri being an unused substitute. He was retained in the national squad to face Lebanon on 25 March 2025 for the first group match of the 2027 AFC Asian Cup qualification. This time he was brought on in the last 15 minutes for his second international cap, but Brunei were eventually beaten 5–0 in the match hosted by Qatar.

== Honours ==
Indera SC

- Brunei Super League: 2014
- Brunei FA Cup: 2017–18
- Sumbangsih Cup: 2018

Kasuka FC

- Brunei Super League (2): 2023, 2024–25

== Personal life ==
Asri is a fan of Manchester United of the Premier League and also Johor Darul Ta'zim F.C. of the Malaysia Super League.

Asri works as a facility manager at Seri Begawan Religious Teachers University College.
