= Hibatur Rahman Mohamad =

Bruneian footballer (born 2000)

Hibatur Rahman
Personal information
- Full name: Mohamad Hibatur Rahman bin Mohamad
- Date of birth: 1 January 2000 (age 26)
- Place of birth: Brunei
- Position: Defender

Team information
- Current team: MS ABDB
- Number: 6

Senior career*
Years	Team	Apps	(Gls)
2017–2021	Rimba Star		(2)
2023–	MS ABDB	32	(4)

International career^{‡}
2016	Brunei U16	3	(0)
2025–	Brunei	4	(0)
- * Club domestic league appearances and goals as of 3 November 2026 ‡ National team caps and goals as of 1 April 2026

Lance Corporal (U) Mohamad Hibatur Rahman bin Mohamad (born 1 January 2000) is a Bruneian footballer who plays as a defender for MS ABDB and the Brunei national team.

== Club career ==
Hibatur began playing league football with Rimba Star FC of the Brunei Premier League in 2017. He scored his first league goal away against BSRC FC in a 3–1 loss on 14 May. He stayed at the club until the end of the 2021 season which was cut short due to the COVID-19 pandemic in Brunei.

Now enlisted in the Royal Brunei Air Force, Hibatur joined the football team of the Royal Brunei Armed Forces in the 2023 season under Yusof Matyassin. Initially a central midfielder, Yusof converted Hibatur to a left-sided centre-back in his preferred 3-5-2 formation. Hibatur scored his first goal for the armymen in a 2–0 victory over his previous team Rimba Star on 25 June. The team performed well in the 16-team league and finished in fourth place at the end of the season.

After the departure of first team players such as Martin Haddy Khallidden, Nazry Aiman Azaman and Abdul Hariz Herman to DPMM FC at the start of the 2024–25 season, the armymen found the league more challenging and only managed a mid-table finish. However, in the following 2025 Brunei FA Cup, MS ABDB was able to reach the semi-finals and subsequently win the third place playoff over Kasuka FC where Hibatur scored his team's first goal in a late comeback and later on converted his penalty in the shootout.

== International career ==
=== Youth ===
Hibatur was part of the Brunei U16 squad that participated in the July 2016 AFF U-16 Youth Championship held in Cambodia, making three appearances all from the bench.

=== Senior ===
After notable performances for MS ABDB in the 2025 Brunei FA Cup, Hibatur was selected for the Brunei national football team in June 2025, gearing up for a friendly match against Sri Lanka and afterwards the 2027 AFC Asian Cup qualification group match versus Bhutan. He was played from the start in the Sri Lanka game held in Bangkok in a 1–0 loss on 5 June. He was kept in the lineup for the Bhutan match five days later, and helped the Wasps to a 2–1 victory at the Hassanal Bolkiah National Stadium.

After missing the October fixtures for the Wasps, Hibatur was restored to the starting lineup by Fabio Maciel for the Asian Cup qualification fixture against Lebanon on 18 November. His team suffered a defeat at the Hassanal Bolkiah National Stadium by three goals to nil.

Hibatur was recalled to the Wasps for the final Asian Cup qualification group match against Bhutan in March 2026, and started the match that resulted in a 2–1 defeat for Brunei.
