= Abdul Khair Basri =

Bruneian footballer (born 1996)

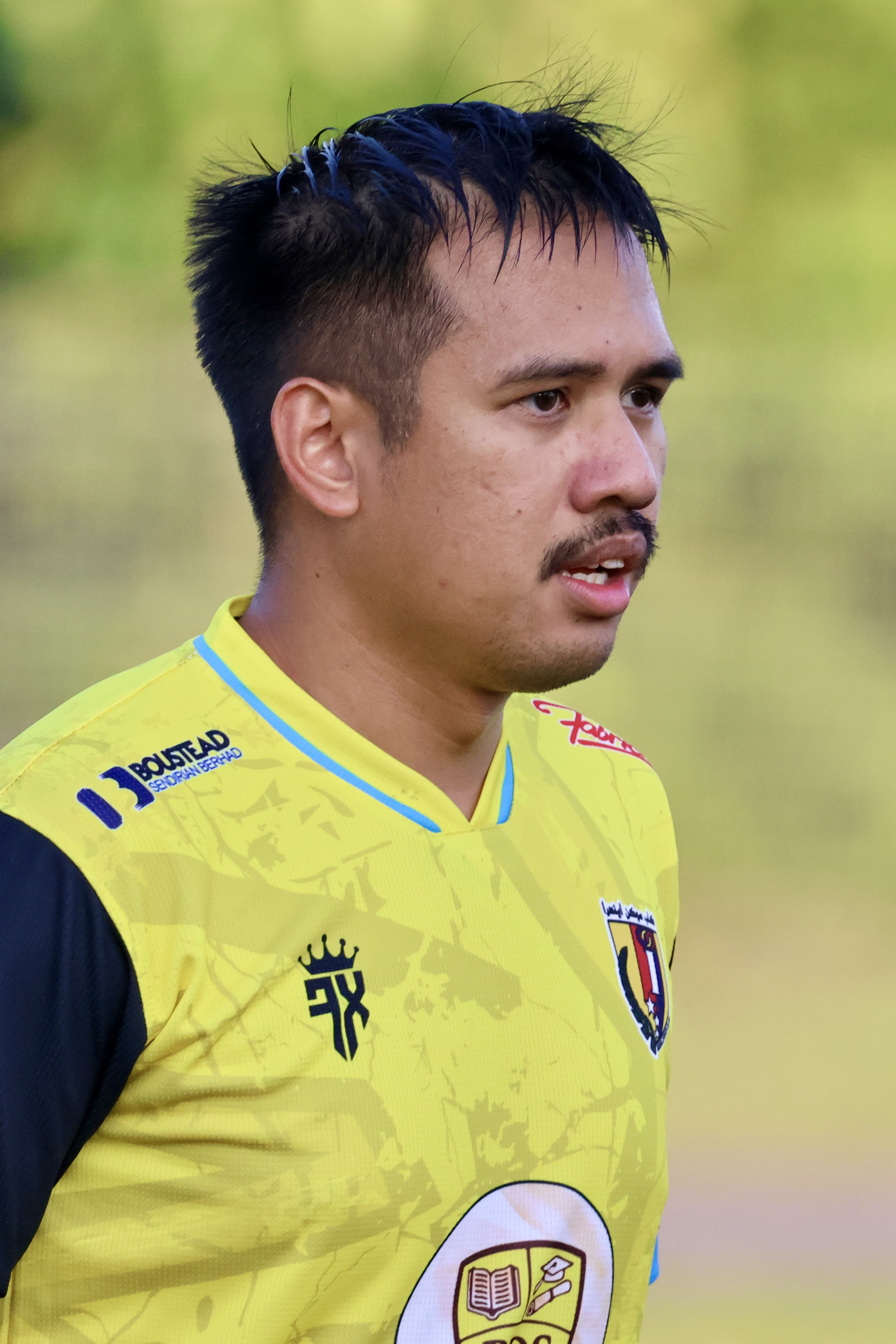
- Abdul Khair with Indera in 2024

Personal information
- Full name: Haji Abdul Khair bin Haji Basri
- Date of birth: 5 January 1996 (age 30)
- Place of birth: Brunei
- Height: 1.71 m (5 ft 7 in)
- Position: Midfielder

Team information
- Current team: Indera SC
- Number: 17

Youth career
- 2010: PIP
- 2013: Muara Vella

Senior career*
| Years | Team | Apps | (Gls) |
| 2013–2014 | Indera | | (2) |
| 2015–2016 | Tabuan Muda | | (2) |
| 2018– | Indera | | (5) |

International career^{‡}
| 2014 | Brunei U21 | 2 | (0) |
| 2014 | Brunei U23 | 2 | (0) |
| 2015–2022 | Brunei | 3 | (0) |
- * Club domestic league appearances and goals as of 20 September 2025 ‡ National team caps and goals as of 8 January 2025

Haji Abdul Khair bin Haji Basri (born 5 January 1996) is a Bruneian international footballer who plays for Indera SC. Predominantly a central midfielder, his attributes and versatility also allows him to play as a centre-back or as a forward when required.

== Club career ==
Khair is a graduate of Projek Ikan Pusu (PIP), a successful local grassroots football scheme that also produced Brunei internationals such as Yura Indera Putera Yunos and Aman Abdul Rahim. He moved to Indera SC in 2013, and won the first ever Brunei Super League championship.

Khair was captain of Tabuan Muda, a league team that was formed by the NFABD to prepare for international competitions. They finished in mid-table in the 2015 and 2016 seasons of the Bruneian top flight.

After taking time off for studies in 2017, he re-signed for Indera in early 2018, appearing at the 4–1 win over IKLS FC in the FA Cup.

In recent times, Khair has been captaining the side in the absence of Amirul Hakeem Kasim and Hamizan Aziz Sulaiman. He led the team to the final of the 2025 Brunei FA Cup, scoring in the semis against MS ABDB. On 18 May 2025 Khair started the match as captain against DPMM FC II in a narrow 1–0 loss.

On 19 September 2025, Khair's long-range goal against Jerudong FC became the first goal of the 2025–26 Brunei Super League in a 0–3 win. The captain led Indera to the championship after winning the title-decider against Kasuka FC in a 3–2 victory on 19 April 2026.

== International career ==
Khair was a member of the Brunei under-21 team that played in the 2014 Hassanal Bolkiah Trophy. He made his sole appearance in the final group game against Malaysia where despite winning the match 2–1, the home side failed to advance to the semi-final stage on goal difference.

A year later, Khair travelled with the under-23s for the 2016 AFC U-23 Championship qualification held in Indonesia in late March 2015. However, he missed out on the squad for the 28th SEA Games held in May.

Khair made his full international debut on 6 June 2015 versus Singapore in a friendly match that finished 5–1 against Brunei. He was selected for the 2016 AFF Suzuki Cup qualification matches held in Cambodia in October. He made substitute appearances in the last two group games against Cambodia and Laos.

== Honours ==
Indera SC

- Brunei Super League (3): 2012–13, 2014, 2025–26
- Brunei FA Cup: 2017–18, 2025 (runner-up)
