= Khairil Shahme Suhaimi =

Bruneian footballer (born 1993)

Khairil Shahme
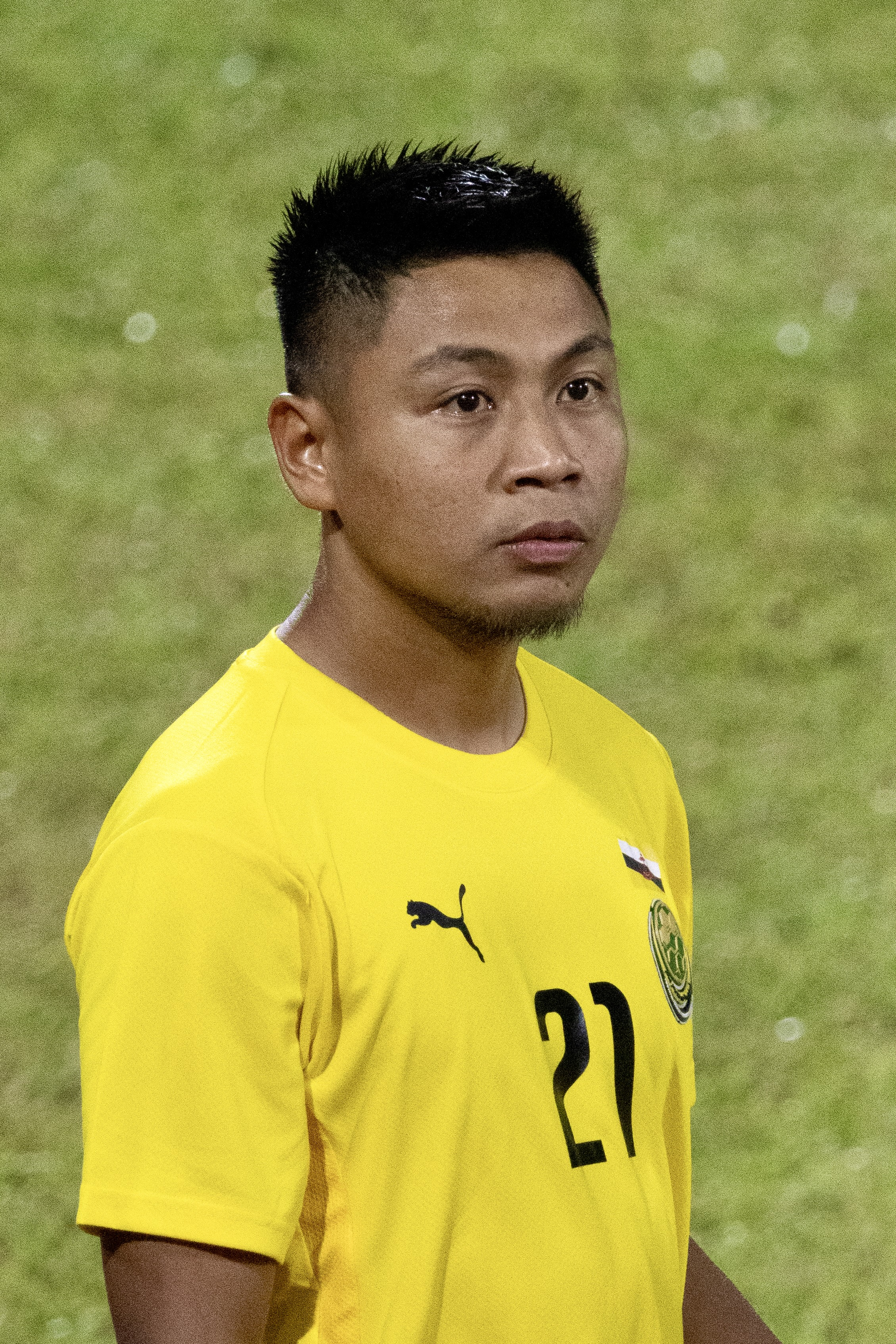
- Khairil with Brunei in 2024

Personal information
- Full name: Mohammad Khairil Shahme bin Suhaimi
- Date of birth: 16 April 1993 (age 33)
- Place of birth: Brunei
- Positions: Defender; holding midfielder

Team information
- Current team: Kasuka
- Number: 21

Senior career*
Years	Team	Apps	(Gls)
2011	Brunei Youth Team		
2014	IKLS		(2)
2015–2016	Tabuan Muda		(1)
2017–2021	Indera		(1)
2022–	Kasuka	37	(7)

International career^{‡}
2010–2011	Brunei U18		
2013–2015	Brunei U23	12	(0)
2014	Brunei U21	5	(0)
2015–	Brunei	25	(0)
- * Club domestic league appearances and goals as of 8 November 2026 ‡ National team caps and goals as of 20 November 2025

Mohammad Khairil Shahme bin Suhaimi (born 16 April 1993) is a Bruneian footballer who plays as a defender or holding midfielder for Brunei Super League club Kasuka and the Brunei national team.

== Club career ==
Khairil began his league football career with the Brunei Youth Team playing in the Brunei Premier League II.

=== IKLS ===
At the end of a year-long preparation for the 27th SEA Games, Khairil joined IKLS for the 2014 Brunei Premier League season, scoring two goals from defence for the Kampong Ayer-based team.

=== Tabuan Muda ===
The following season, Khairil was placed in the newly-formed Tabuan Muda league team playing in the Brunei Super League in preparation for the next SEA Games which was to be held in Singapore. He scored his only goal for the Young Wasps against MS PDB on 22 November in a 5–1 victory.

=== Indera SC ===
Khairil moved to Indera SC in 2017 and shortly after was appointed club captain, replacing Afi Aminuddin who left for Kota Ranger. He managed to win the Brunei FA Cup later in the season, the first ever for Indera. He also gained continental club competition experience at the 2020 AFC Cup. He scored his first and solitary league goal for Indera in their opening fixture of the 2021 Brunei Super League season against BSRC on 20 June.

=== Kasuka ===
Khairil left Indera to join Kasuka for their 2022 Brunei FA Cup campaign. His team finished as runners-up to DPMM at the conclusion of the season. In the 2023 domestic season, his team went undefeated after 16 games in the league, crowning them as champions for the shortened season. They repeated their feat in dramatic fashion in the following season, beating DPMM II 2–3 in their final fixture. The reverse happened to Kasuka in the 2025–26 season, where they lost in the final match against Indera SC after dominating the league the entire time.

== International career ==
=== Youth ===
As part of Tabuan Muda, Khairil travelled with the Brunei under-18s for a few Asian Schools Football Championship tournaments, including the one in 2010 where they were barred from participating by FIFA as soon as they landed in South Korea due to the ban imposed by football's governing body at the time. A period of centralised training for the 27th SEA Games commenced in March 2013, which Khairil took part in. Unfortunately, the Brunei under-23 squad which boasted the likes of Azwan Ali Rahman, Adi Said, Yura Indera Putera and Nur Ikhwan Othman failed to earn a single point in Myanmar the following December. In the third match against Singapore, Khairil was given his marching orders on the 65th minute for an off-the-ball incident, prematurely ending his involvement in the tournament.

Khairil's next international competition was with the under-21s at the 2014 Hassanal Bolkiah Trophy to be contested in August on home soil. He was ever-present in the group games, partnering Reduan Petara at centre-back. Brunei were eliminated by virtue of a single point in goal difference by Malaysia after both had accumulated 10 points.

The following year, Khairil was in the Brunei under-23 squad for both the 2016 AFC U-23 Championship qualification in March and the 28th SEA Games held in Singapore in May. He played three games for the AFC tournament in Indonesia, all ending in defeat. The team did not fare any better two months later, failing to score in five outings with Khairil playing in all of them.

=== Senior ===
Khairil made his first international appearance for the full national team in a friendly against Cambodia in Phnom Penh which finished 6–1 to the hosts. A year later, he travelled to the same city for the 2016 AFF Championship qualification matches, facing the hosts as well as Laos and Timor-Leste. He was fielded only for the final game against Laos but only lasted the first half in a 4–3 loss on 21 October. The squad immediately turned their focus to the 2016 AFC Solidarity Cup in Kuching, Malaysia the next month. Khairil made another solitary appearance, this time in a 3–0 loss against Nepal on 8 November in the group stage.

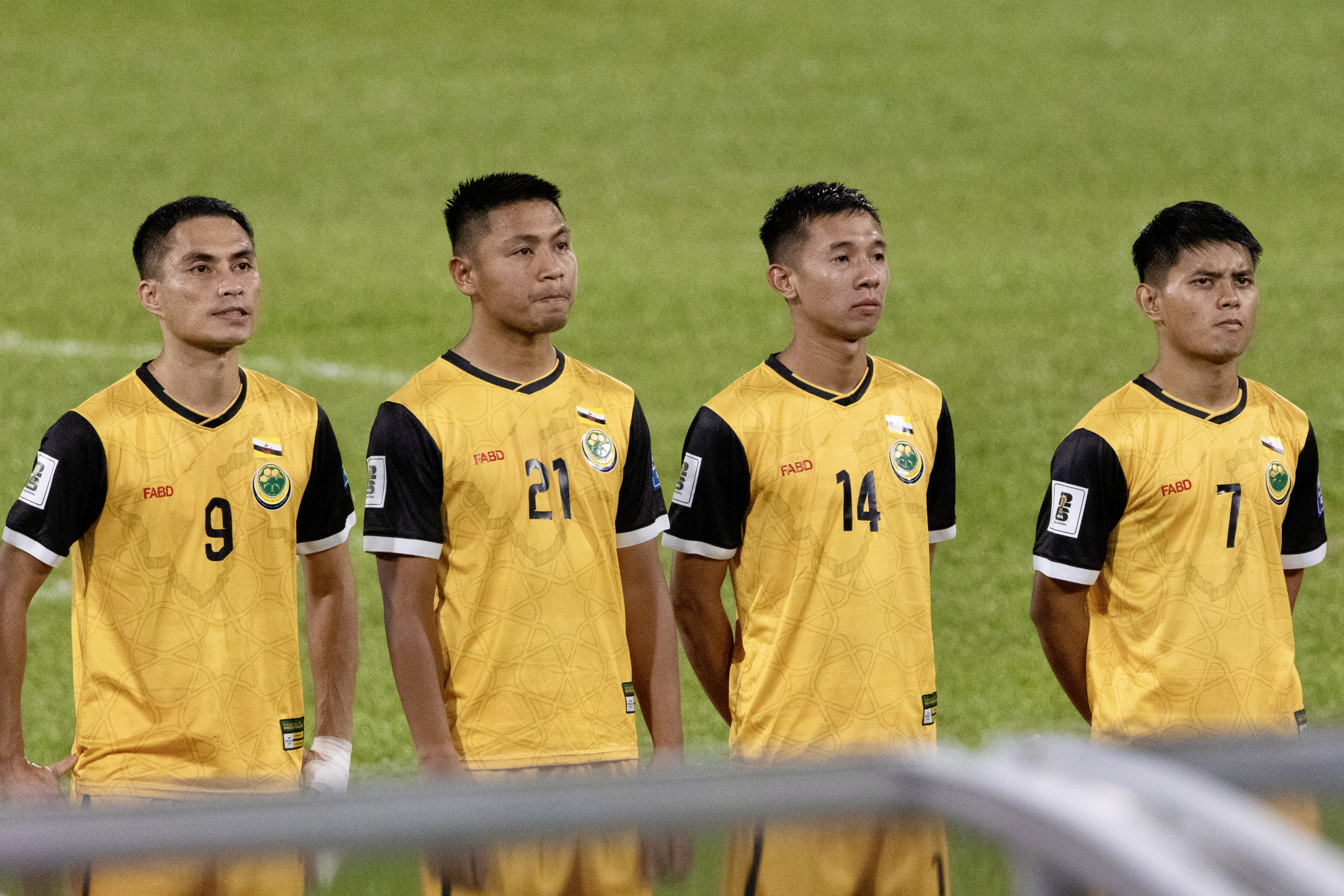
Khairil playing against Indonesia during the 2026 FIFA World Cup qualification

Khairil was called up to the national team for the two-legged 2018 AFF Suzuki Cup qualifying matches against Timor-Leste in September. He played in both legs, partnering Hazwan Hamzah. The first leg which was played in Kuala Lumpur, Malaysia on 1 September finished 3–1 to Timor-Leste, which meant that a 1–0 home victory in the return leg at the Hassanal Bolkiah National Stadium was not enough for Brunei to qualify for the tournament.

Khairil joined the national team for the 2022 World Cup qualifying matches against Mongolia in a two-legged affair in June 2019. He ultimately did not take the field as Robbie Servais opted for the experience of Sairol Sahari instead.

In September 2022, Khairil was announced for a tri-nations friendly tournament involving the Maldives and Laos to commence in Bandar Seri Begawan. Under new head coach Mario Rivera, Khairil was converted into a holding midfielder and impressed in the second game against Laos which ended 1–0 to the Wasps. He kept his place in the lineup for the two-legged 2022 AFF Mitsubishi Electric Cup qualifying matches against Timor-Leste and played the full 180 minutes as Brunei managed to advance to the tournament proper with a 6–3 aggregate win. The next month, Khairil made three starts against Thailand, Indonesia and Cambodia in the tournament's group stage, all ending in defeat for the Wasps.

On 11 September 2023, Khairil played from the start at a friendly against Hong Kong and suffered a humiliating 10–0 defeat. He was also luckless as a starter a month later in the 2026 World Cup qualification matches against Indonesia where the Wasps were defeated 0–6 in both games.

In March 2024, Khairil was selected for the national team to travel to Saudi Arabia for matches against Bermuda and Vanuatu for the 2024 FIFA Series. He made two appearances where Brunei recorded a loss against their CONCACAF opponent and a win against the OFC side.

The following September, Khairil was chosen for the squad to face Macau at the play-offs to contest a spot at the final qualifying round of the 2027 Asian Cup. In the first leg at home on the 6th in Bandar Seri Begawan, Khairil was a second-half substitute where Brunei ran out 3–0 victors. Four days later in the return leg away at Macau, Khairil also came on in the later stage of the game where Brunei posted a 0–1 victory, winning the tie 4–0 on aggregate to advance to the next round. His next appearance was as a substitute in a 0–0 draw against Timor-Leste in Chonburi, Thailand which was the away leg for the 2024 ASEAN Championship qualifying on 15 October. The Timorese won the tie 0–1 on aggregate, eliminating Brunei from the regional tournament in December.

Khairil was selected for the Brunei national team in June 2025 first against Sri Lanka in a friendly match held in Bangkok on the 5th and also for the 2027 AFC Asian Cup qualification group game against Bhutan at home five days later. Khairil started the friendly against the Lankans in center midfield but the Wasps were defeated 1–0. He was a late substitute in the next game against the Bhutanese, when this time Brunei won the game 2–1.

Khairil's next appearance with Brunei was on 14 October 2025 in the fourth fixture of the Asian Cup qualification tournament against Yemen away in Kuwait. He replaced Hanif Farhan Azman who did not travel with the team in central midfield. He had to endure the Yemeni attacking prowess the whole game, resulting in a 9–0 defeat. A month later, he won his 25th cap for Brunei in a 0–3 loss to Lebanon in the same competition on 18 November, playing as a starter.

== Honours ==
Indera SC

- Brunei FA Cup: 2017–18
- Sumbangsih Cup: 2018

Kasuka FC

- Brunei Super League (2): 2023, 2024–25
