= Martin Haddy Khallidden =

Bruneian footballer

Martin Haddy

Personal information
- Full name: Muhammad Martin Haddy bin Awang Haji Khallidden
- Date of birth: 21 April 1998 (age 28)
- Place of birth: Tutong, Brunei
- Position: Defender

Team information
- Current team: DPMM FC
- Number: 14

Senior career*
Years	Team	Apps	(Gls)
2017–2018	Najip I-Team		(0)
2018–2019	Kasuka		(0)
2021–2024	MS ABDB	19	(1)
2024–2025	DPMM II	13	(0)
2025–	DPMM	1	(0)

International career^{‡}
2015	Brunei U19	2	(0)
2017–2019	Brunei U23	5	(0)
2018	Brunei U21	2	(0)
2022–	Brunei	5	(0)
- * Club domestic league appearances and goals as of 8 December 2025 ‡ National team caps and goals as of 16 November 2026

Laskar Muhammad Martin Haddy bin Awang Haji Khallidden (born 21 April 1998) is a Bruneian footballer who plays as a defender for Malaysia Super League side DPMM FC and the Brunei national team.

== Club career ==
=== Early career ===
An established Brunei youth international, Martin began his footballing career with Najip I-Team FC playing in the 2017–18 Brunei Super League. He was signed to Kasuka FC's youth team in the following season but failed to break into the first team, despite being a Young Wasps regular who played at the 2018 Hassanal Bolkiah Trophy.

=== MS ABDB ===
Enlisted into the Royal Brunei Navy at the turn of the decade, Martin laced up for the football team of the Royal Brunei Armed Forces from the 2021 season, uniting him with elder brother Hariz Danial. The armymen played only six games until the subsequent abandonment of the league due to the second outbreak of COVID-19 cases in the country.

When football resumed with the 2022 Brunei FA Cup the following year, Martin became ever-present under Yusof Matyassin's youthful MS ABDB side who managed to go all the way to the semi-finals of the competition. The army side lost 3–1 on aggregate to eventual runners-up Kasuka FC. He continued to contribute regularly at the 2023 Brunei Super League for the armymen to manage a fourth place finish.

=== DPMM II ===
At the start of the 2024–25 Brunei Super League, Martin became one of the players recruited by DPMM FC to play for their second team in domestic competition. Playing alongside Brazilian centre-back Marcelo and Azrin Danial Yusra, Martin was an undisputed starter for Helme Panjang's side as they became victorious in all of their games right until the final fixture at home against Kasuka FC on 2 February 2025, losing 2–3 to the eventual champions.

Martin would finally gain silverware at the 2025 Brunei FA Cup, going all the way to the final where his team became triumphant against Indera SC with a score of 1–0.

=== DPMM ===
Martin's performances for DPMM's second team was rewarded with his inclusion into the first team before the start of the 2025–26 Malaysia Super League. He officially signed as a squad member on 5 August 2025. Martin made his Malaysia Super League debut as a late substitute in a 4–2 win against Immigration FC on 7 December 2025.

== International career ==
=== Youth ===
Martin's first major youth tournament with the Young Wasps was the 2015 AFF U-19 Youth Championship held in Laos under South Korean tactician Kwon Oh-son. He was fielded in the final two games, playing from the start against Thailand where Brunei let in six goals unanswered.

Martin's next international call was with the Under-23s in July 2017 for the 2018 AFC U-23 Championship qualification matches held in Myanmar. He featured in only one game which was against the host nation in a 0–3 loss. The following month, he joined Brunei's contingent for the 2017 SEA Games in Kuala Lumpur, Malaysia but once again Kwon utilised him sparingly, being fielded in only the final deadwood game against Singapore where they narrowly lost 0–1.

Martin featured for the Under-21s as host nation at the 2018 Hassanal Bolkiah Trophy in April, starting against Timor-Leste and Myanmar in the group stage. In both encounters, the Young Wasps lost by a single goal.

In March of the following year, Martin was selected for the 2020 AFC U-23 Championship qualifying matches held in Hanoi, Vietnam. He was the starting defender in all of their games where they conceded fourteen goals in their first two games. A spirited performance in the final match against Indonesia prevented Garuda Muda from scoring more than twice, and the Young Wasps could have taken a point from the game if not for a penalty save by emergency goalkeeper Dimas Drajad to deny Nazirrudin Ismail in stoppage time.

=== Senior ===
Martin's first involvement with the full national team was at the November 2022 AFF Championship qualification two-legged affair against Timor-Leste, when both legs were held in Brunei. He did not see action as Brunei emerged as victors 6–3 on aggregate.

After consistent performances for DPMM II in league and cup in 2025, Martin received his first callup to the national team after three years at the 2027 AFC Asian Cup qualification fixture against Bhutan on 10 June. After making his official international debut 5 days before against Sri Lanka away in Thailand, Martin was also brought on as a substitute in the closing stages where they prevailed 2–1 at home against the South Asian side.

In June 2026, Martin was included in the Brunei squad to face Timor-Leste for the qualification to the 2026 Hyundai Cup. He managed two substitute appearances in a 6–1 aggregate defeat for the Wasps. The following November, Martin was selected for Brunei for their invitation to the 2026 King's Cup from Thailand. He started the semi-final against the tournament hosts in a 6–0 defeat on the 14th, as well as the third-place match against Oman where the Wasps fell 0–7 to the West Asian side.

== Honours ==
DPMM II

- Brunei Super League: 2024–25 (runners-up)
- Brunei FA Cup: 2025

== Personal life ==
His elder brother Hariz Danial is also a footballer for MS ABDB and the Brunei national team.
