= Elisha Kashim =

Nigerian footballer

Personal information
- Full name: Elisha Oluwasegun Kashim
- Date of birth: 14 January 2005 (age 21)
- Place of birth: Nigeria
- Height: 1.90 m (6 ft 3 in)
- Position: Striker

Team information
- Current team: PDRM FC
- Number: 8

Senior career*
Years	Team	Apps	(Gls)
2024–2025	Indera	7	(7)
2025–	PDRM	15	(1)
- * Club domestic league appearances and goals as of 8 July 2026

Elisha Oluwasegun Kashim (born 14 January 2005) is a Nigerian footballer who plays as a striker for PDRM FC.

== Career ==
=== Indera SC ===
Kashim moved to Brunei from his native Nigeria to play for Indera SC of the Brunei Super League for the 2024–25 season under head coach and compatriot Mba Vitus Onyekachi. He made his debut against MS ABDB in a 0–0 draw on 19 October 2024. It was not until 1 December of that year when Kashim scored his first goal for the club against Wijaya FC in a 7–1 victory. At the turn of the year, he then showed a brilliant run of form towards the tail end of the league, netting six times in January including a hat-trick against Rimba Star that finished 12–1. That played a part in Indera's third place finish in the league when it concluded in February.

At the 2025 Brunei FA Cup, Kashim flourished under new head coach Raja Isa who paired him with the returning Leon Sullivan Taylor up front. After they automatically entered the knockout stage through the withdrawal of Panchor Murai FC, Kashim scored in every fixture leading to the cup final against DPMM FC II on 18 May. Unfortunately for the Nigerian, the royalty-owned team prevailed with a single goal from Matías Hernández, leaving him with only a runners-up medal.

=== PDRM FC ===
In the summer transfer window of 2025, Kashim was signed by PDRM FC who are playing in the Malaysia Super League. He made the starting lineup in the first game of the 2025–26 season at home against Brunei DPMM FC on 8 August 2025. He scored his first goal for the Policemen against KL City on 30 January 2026 in a 1–1 draw.

== Career statistics ==
As of 8 July 2026

Club	Season	League			Cup		Other		Total	
Club	Season	Division	Apps	Goals	Apps	Goals	Apps	Goals	Apps	Goals
Indera	2024–25	Brunei Super League	7	7	6	5	0	0	13	12
PDRM	2025–26	Malaysia Super League	15	1	0	0	3 (Note: Appearances in Malaysia Cup and MFL Challenge Cup)	0	18	1
Career total			22	8	6	5	3	0	31	13

== Honours ==
Indera

- Brunei FA Cup: 2025 (runner-up)
