= Zulkhairy Razali =

Bruneian footballer

Personal information
- Full name: Mohamed Zulkhairy Hady bin Razali
- Date of birth: 16 May 1996 (age 30)
- Place of birth: Kuala Belait, Brunei
- Position: Striker

Team information
- Current team: PBDB FT
- Number: 12

Youth career
- Sports School

Senior career*
| Years | Team | Apps | (Gls) |
| 2014–2022 | Indera | | (15) |
| 2024– | PBDB | 1 | (1) |

International career^{‡}
| 2012 | Brunei U18 | | |
| 2013–2017 | Brunei U23 | 6 | (1) |
| 2014 | Brunei U21 | 2 | (0) |
| 2015–2018 | Brunei | 2 | (0) |
- * Club domestic league appearances and goals as of 4 August 2017 ‡ National team caps and goals as of 3 September 2018

Mohamed Zulkhairy Hady bin Razali (born 16 May 1996) is a Bruneian footballer who plays for PBDB FT of the Belait DIstrict League. Aged just 18, he was the 2014 Brunei Super League top scorer with 11 goals (widely misreported as 16 goals). (Note: Zulkhairy was widely touted to have scored 16 goals in the 2014 Brunei Super League. This is not the case as he had only scored 11 goals in the whole season as shown below:)

== Club career ==
Zulkhairy is a product of Brunei's Sports School which alumni includes other Brunei internationals such as Afi Aminuddin, Azwan Ali Rahman and Shafie Effendy. Already a seasoned national youth player by 2014, he joined powerhouses Indera SC and helped them to winning the championship with two games to spare.

Zulkhairy was largely anonymous in 2016 as Indera's season was disrupted by the Indera-Kasuka scuffle that made the club spend five months without playing a league match. He finally found his scoring touch in the following season, netting the opener in a 6–0 win against Najip I-Team on 10 July 2017.

On 1 April 2018, Zulkhairy scored the first goal in the final of the 2017-18 DST FA Cup in which Indera SC won 2–0.

== International career ==
Zulkhairy has been with the national team setup since 2012, when he was chosen to represent Brunei at the 40th Asian Schools Football Championship for Under-18s that year. His first appearance for Brunei under-23s came at a friendly against Indonesia at Maguwoharjo Stadium on 15 August 2013. He competed at the 27th SEA Games, appearing once as a substitute against Laos in a 3–2 loss.

Zulkhairy played for the under-21s at the 2014 Hassanal Bolkiah Trophy. Brunei narrowly missed out on advancing to the knockout stage by virtue of goal difference. Zulkhairy made his appearances in the first two games, after which his place was taken by Abdul Azim Abdul Rasid.

Zulkhairy made his senior international debut as a substitute against Singapore in a June 2015 friendly. In mid-2017, he was selected to play for Brunei's under-23 selection for the 2018 AFC U-23 Championship qualification games in Myanmar and also the following 29th SEA Games currently held in Malaysia. On 14 August, he scored Brunei's solitary goal against hosts Malaysia in the first group game of the SEA Games.

Zulkhairy was selected for the national team's AFF Suzuki Cup qualifying matches against Timor-Leste in early September 2018. He was a second-half substitute in the first leg which finished 3–1 to Timor-Leste. Brunei failed to advance to the competition proper, losing 2–3 on aggregate.

== Honours ==
=== Team ===
Indera SC

- Brunei Super League: 2014
- Brunei FA Cup: 2017–18
- Sumbangsih Cup: 2018

=== Individual ===
- Brunei Super League top scorer: 2014

== Notes ==
| Goal | Date | Opponent | Score | Result | Ref |
|---|---|---|---|---|---|
| 1. | 8 March | Kilanas FC | 1–0 | 4–1 | |
| 2. | 8 March | Kilanas FC | 3–1 | 4–1 | |
| 3. | 17 March | LLRC FT | 2–0 | 3–0 | |
| 4. | 17 March | LLRC FT | 3–0 | 3–0 | |
| 5. | 1 April | MS PDB | 2–0 | 2–0 | |
| 6. | 5 April | Wijaya FC | 1–0 | 5–0 | |
| 7. | 12 April | MS ABDB | 2–0 | 2–0 | |
| 8. | 12 May | LLRC FT | 2–0 | 2–0 | |
| 9. | 1 June | Jerudong FC | 4–0 | 6–0 | |
| 10. | 4 June | Wijaya FC | 4–2 | 4–2 | |
| 11. | 20 June | MS PDB | 1–0 | 1–0 | |
