= Azrin Danial Yusra =

Bruneian footballer

- Azrin with DPMM II in 2024

Personal information
- Full name: Mohamad Azrin Danial bin Haji Mohamad Yusra
- Date of birth: 11 February 2006 (age 20)
- Place of birth: Brunei
- Position: Defender

Team information
- Current team: DPMM FC II
- Number: 4

Youth career
- PIP
- 2021–2023: DPMM
- 2023: Woodlands Warriors

Senior career*
Years	Team	Apps	(Gls)
2024–2025	DPMM II	12	(1)
2025–2026	Indera	8	(0)
2026–	DPMM II	3	(0)

International career^{‡}
2022	Brunei U17	3	(0)
2024	Brunei U20	6	(0)
2025–	Brunei U23	6	(0)
2025–	Brunei	4	(0)
- * Club domestic league appearances and goals as of 3 November 2026 ‡ National team caps and goals as of 19 November 2026

Mohamad Azrin Danial bin Haji Mohamad Yusra (born 11 February 2006) is a Bruneian footballer who plays for Brunei Super League team DPMM FC II and the Brunei national football team as a defender.

== Club career ==
A native of Temburong, Azrin first trained with Projek Ikan Pusu, a renowned grassroots youth development organisation in Brunei. He moved to the youth team of DPMM FC in 2021, playing in the Brunei Under-15 Youth League alongside Prince Abdul Muntaqim. Two years later, he took up a playing stint with Singaporean youth side Woodlands Warriors and won a youth tournament with them in Batam in October 2023.

When DPMM re-established a second team in the domestic league in the 2024–25 season, Azrin played regularly under Helme Panjang, forming a three-man backline with Marcelo and Martin Haddy Khallidden. He scored his first league goal in a 12–1 win over Lun Bawang FC on 8 November 2024. DPMM II nearly won the championship in the final game of the season if not for Willian dos Santos' dramatic hat-trick and seizing it for Kasuka FC with a 2–3 victory. Nevertheless, Azrin was able to win the subsequent 2025 Brunei FA Cup after a 1–0 win over Indera SC in the final.

After DPMM II disbanded the following season, Azrin transferred to Indera along with several of his teammates, making his debut in a 3–0 victory against Jerudong FC on 19 September 2025. Indera kept chasing top spot in the league until the final game against Kasuka on 19 April 2026 where only a win would do for them. Indera prevailed when two-goal hero Akram Waqeel Bakri and a strike from Leon Sullivan Taylor saw the game finish 2–3 to Indera, with Azrin finally being on the winning side of a championship decider.

DPMM II reformed for the 2026–27 Brunei Super League and Azrin returned to the side, making the starting lineup in a 6–2 win against Rimba Star on 12 September 2026.

== International career ==
=== Youth ===
Azrin's first experience with the Young Wasps was the 2022 AFF U-16 Youth Championship held in Indonesia where he was mauled 10–0 by Laos in his only appearance on 7 August. Two months later, he jetted off to Tashkent with the under-17s for the 2023 AFC U-17 Asian Cup qualification matches against Uzbekistan and South Korea, and could not stop the two nations from scoring double digits past the Young Wasps.

In mid-2024, Azrin was picked for the Brunei under-19s competing in both the 2024 ASEAN U-19 Boys Championship and the 2025 AFC U-20 Asian Cup qualifying tournament, playing in all six games.

The following year, Azrin featured for the Brunei under-23 playing at the 2025 ASEAN U-23 Championship. It was a forgettable tournament for Azrin as he struggled against the physique of Jens Raven who scored six goals in the first game against hosts Indonesia which finished 8–0, dismantled 1–7 against Malaysia, and then was sent off for handball against the Philippines in a 2–0 defeat. Two months later, Azrin was in Qatar for the 2026 AFC U-23 Asian Cup qualification matches, making three appearances.

=== Senior ===
Due to his performances with DPMM II, Azrin was selected for the Brunei national team in March 2026 for the 2027 AFC Asian Cup qualifying third round fixture against Lebanon. He did not take the field in the 5–0 loss that was held in Doha, Qatar.

Azrin was retained by Fábio Maciel in June 2025, when Brunei first played a friendly against Sri Lanka in neutral ground, followed by Bhutan at home for the 2027 AFC Asian Cup qualifying third round. He was an unused substitute in both cases.

Azrin made his Wasps return under Ali Mustafa in September 2026 at the 2026 FIFA ASEAN Cup held in Hong Kong. In the first game against Laos on 24 September, Azrin took the field for his senior debut, replacing Haziq Naqiuddin Syamra in a 3–1 defeat. Six days later, he was also introduced in the second half against Hong Kong in a 0–2 loss. Later in November of that year, he made two appearances at the 2026 King's Cup tournament in Thailand, starting both games against the hosts as well as Oman.

== Career statistics ==
As of 3 November 2026

Club	Season	League			Cup		Other		Total	
Club	Season	Division	Apps	Goals	Apps	Goals	Apps	Goals	Apps	Goals
DPMM II	2024–25	Brunei Super League	12	1	7	0	0	0	19	1
Indera	2025–26	Brunei Super League	8	0	0	0	0	0	8	0
DPMM II	2026–27	Brunei Super League	3	0	0	0	0	0	3	0
Career total			23	1	7	0	0	0	30	1

== Honours ==
=== Team ===
DPMM

- Brunei Super League: 2024–25 (runners-up)
- Brunei FA Cup: 2022

Indera

- Brunei Super League: 2025–26

== Personal life ==
His elder brother Azhari Danial is a forward who plays for Indera SC. His younger brother Azri Danial is also a defender who plays for DPMM II and the Brunei under-20 team.
