= Matías Hernández =

Spanish footballer

Personal information
- Full name: Luís Matías Hernández Mirueña
- Date of birth: 10 September 1997 (age 29)
- Place of birth: Salamanca, Spain
- Height: 1.86 m (6 ft 1 in)
- Positions: Defensive midfielder; centre-back

Team information
- Current team: New Radiant S.C.

Youth career
- –2016: Villegas

Senior career*
Years	Team	Apps	(Gls)
2016–2017	Villegas	15	(6)
2017–2018	Rayo Cantabria	29	(2)
2018–2019	Gimnástica	0	(0)
2019	Laredo	13	(1)
2019–2020	Salamanca B	17	(0)
2020–2021	Formentera	15	(0)
2021–2022	CD Marino	30	(2)
2022–2024	Salamanca	46	(2)
2024–2025	DPMM II	13	(7)
2025–2026	Gokulam Kerala	0	(0)
2026	Kerala Blasters	8	(1)
2026–	New Radiant	0	(0)
- * Club domestic league appearances and goals as of 13:56, 8 September 2026 (UTC)

Luís Matías Hernández Mirueña (born 10 September 1997), commonly known as Matías Hernández, is a Spanish professional footballer who plays as a midfielder or defender for New Radiant SC of the Maldives.

== Career ==
=== DPMM II ===
In August 2024, Hernández moved overseas for the first time and signed for the second team of Bruneian side DPMM FC, playing in the domestic league. DPMM II finished as runners-up in the league to Kasuka FC. In the following domestic cup competition however, Hernández and his team went all the way to the final against Indera SC where his goal in the 73rd minute was enough to clinch the cup for the reserve side.

=== Kerala Blasters ===
On 25 January 2026, he was signed by Indian Super League club Kerala Blasters.

== Honours ==
- Brunei FA Cup: 2025
