= Rosalvo (footballer) =

Brazilian footballer (born 1991)

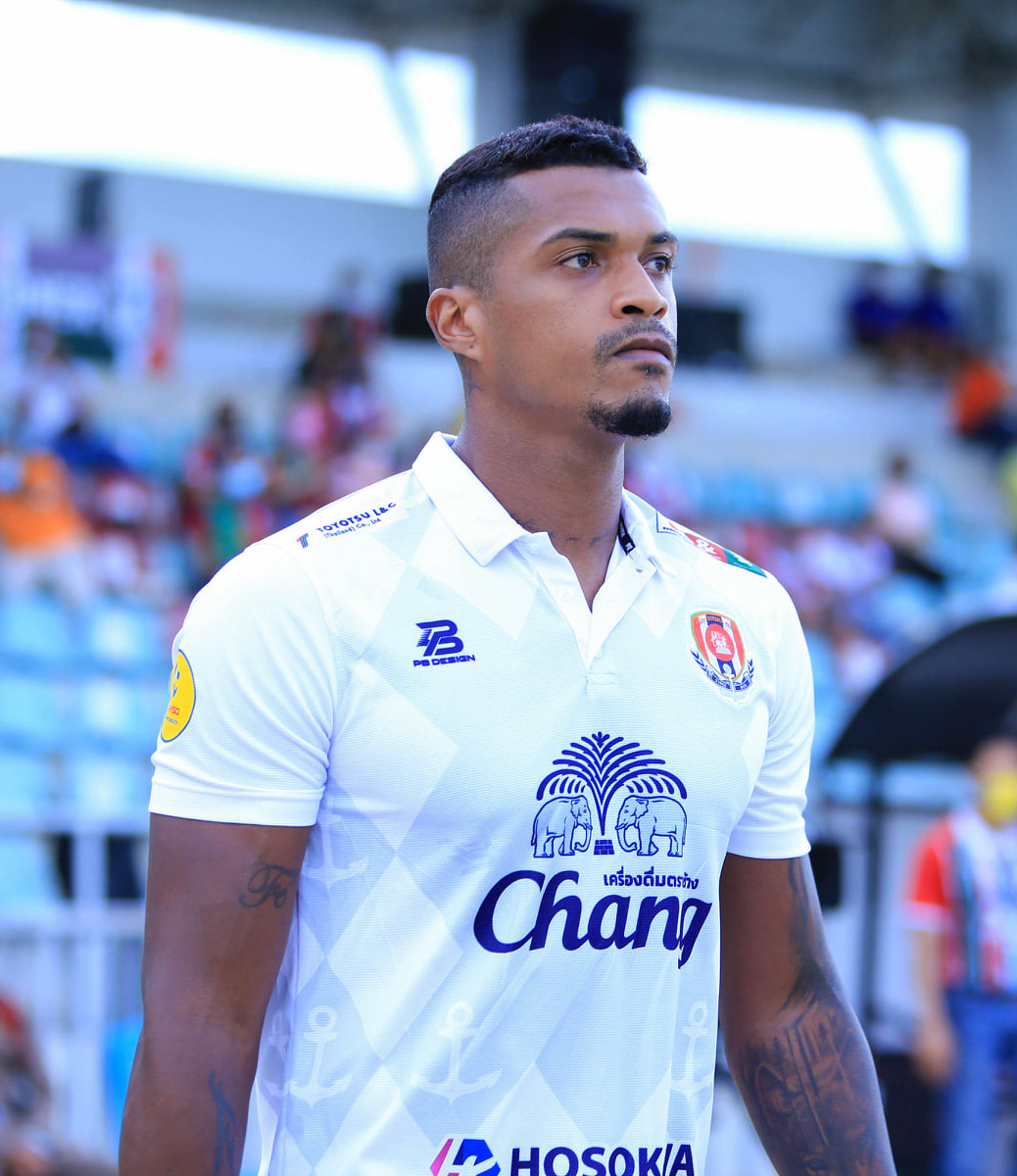
- Rosalvo playing for Navy in 2021

Personal information
- Full name: Rosalvo Cândido Rosa Júnior
- Date of birth: 12 February 1991 (age 35)
- Place of birth: Rio de Janeiro, Brazil
- Height: 1.90 m (6 ft 3 in)
- Position: Forward

Team information
- Current team: Khon Kaen United

Senior career*
Years	Team	Apps	(Gls)
2017–2018	Carqueijo		
2018–2019	Mourisquense	21	(4)
2019	Sunne	5	(1)
2019–2020	Cartaya	5	(0)
2020	Khon Kaen	3	(0)
2020	Rajpracha	14	(8)
2020–2021	Nakhon Si United		
2021	Navy	16	(1)
2022–2023	União Rondonopolis	5	(0)
2023	Kasuka	13	(15)
2023–2024	Deltras	10	(4)
2024–2026	Persijap Jepara	38	(11)
2026	→ Persikad Depok (loan)	9	(6)
2026–	Khon Kaen United	0	(0)
- * Club domestic league appearances and goals as of 9 July 2026

Rosalvo Cândido Rosa Júnior (born 12 February 1991) is a Brazilian professional footballer who plays as a forward for Thai League 2 club Khon Kaen United. He has played league football abroad in Portugal, Sweden, Spain, Thailand, Brunei, and Indonesia.

== Career ==
Starting out with clubs such as SC Carqueijo and AD Mourisquense from the district of Aveiro on the coast of Portugal, Rosalvo was brought in by IFK Sunne in August 2019 for the last five games of the ongoing Division 3 Västra Svealand season, and scored one goal in those matches. He then moved to AD Cartaya in the sixth tier of Spanish football, making five appearances for the club in southwestern Spain.

In early 2020, Rosalvo transferred to his first Thai club Khon Kaen F.C. of the Thai League 2, but moved to Rajpracha F.C. of the T3 West where he became prolific with eight goals in 14 matches total. This earned him a move to Navy F.C. of the T2 the following year where he made 17 appearances, scoring a goal against Lamphun Warriors in a 1–1 draw on 13 November 2021.

After a brief spell at União Esporte Clube of Rondonópolis where the team came second in the 2022 Mato Grosso State League, Rosalvo returned to Southeast Asia with Kasuka FC of Brunei in 2023. He scored a hat-trick in a 8–1 win over Jerudong FC on 25 June of that year. He left the club after the season ended abruptly, ending his tenure with 15 goals in 13 appearances as his now former team won the league comfortably.

Rosalvo joined Deltras of Sidoarjo, Indonesia in November 2023. He scored on his debut in a 2–1 victory over PSCS Cilacap on the 6th of the same month. At the end of July 2024, he was inaugurated as a player for the Persijap Jepara. After a brief loan spell at Persikad Depok in January 2026, Rosalvo left Persijap to return to Khon Kaen in July after last featuring for them six years ago.

== Honours ==
Kasuka FC

- Brunei Super League: 2023

Persijap Jepara

- Liga 2 Promotion play-offs: 2024–25
