= 2014 Brunei Super League =

Brunei Super League
- Season: 2014
- Champions: Indera
- Matches: 72
- Goals: 296 (4.11 per match)

The 2014 Brunei Super League is the second season of the Brunei Super League. It is organized by the National Football Association of Brunei Darussalam and sponsored by DST Group.

== Teams ==
- Indera SC
- Jerudong FC
- Kilanas FC
- LLRC FT
- Majra United FC
- MS ABDB
- MS PDB
- Najip FC
- QAF FC
- Wijaya FC

== League standings ==
Pos	Team	Pld	W	D	L	GF	GA	GD	Pts	Qualification or relegation
1	Indera SC	16	14	1	1	51	14	+37	43	2015 AFC Cup
2	MS ABDB	16	12	1	3	44	18	+26	37	
3	Najip FC	16	8	3	5	33	23	+10	27	
4	MS PDB	16	7	2	7	29	26	+3	23	
5	LLRC FT	16	6	5	5	34	35	−1	23	
6	QAF FC	16	4	5	7	31	35	−4	17	
7	Wijaya FC	16	4	2	10	25	49	−24	14	
8	Jerudong FC	16	2	6	8	24	42	−18	12	
9	Klianas FC	16	2	1	13	25	54	−29	7	
-	Majra United FC	0	0	0	0	0	0	0	0 (Note: Majra withdrew from the league at the end of May after the incident on May 13; all their results were annulled (listed between square brackets for opponents))	Withdrew

Updated to match(es) played on 13 September 2014. Source: Soccerway
Rules for classification: 1) points; 2) goal difference; 3) number of goals scored.
