= 2023 Brunei Super League =

Brunei Super League
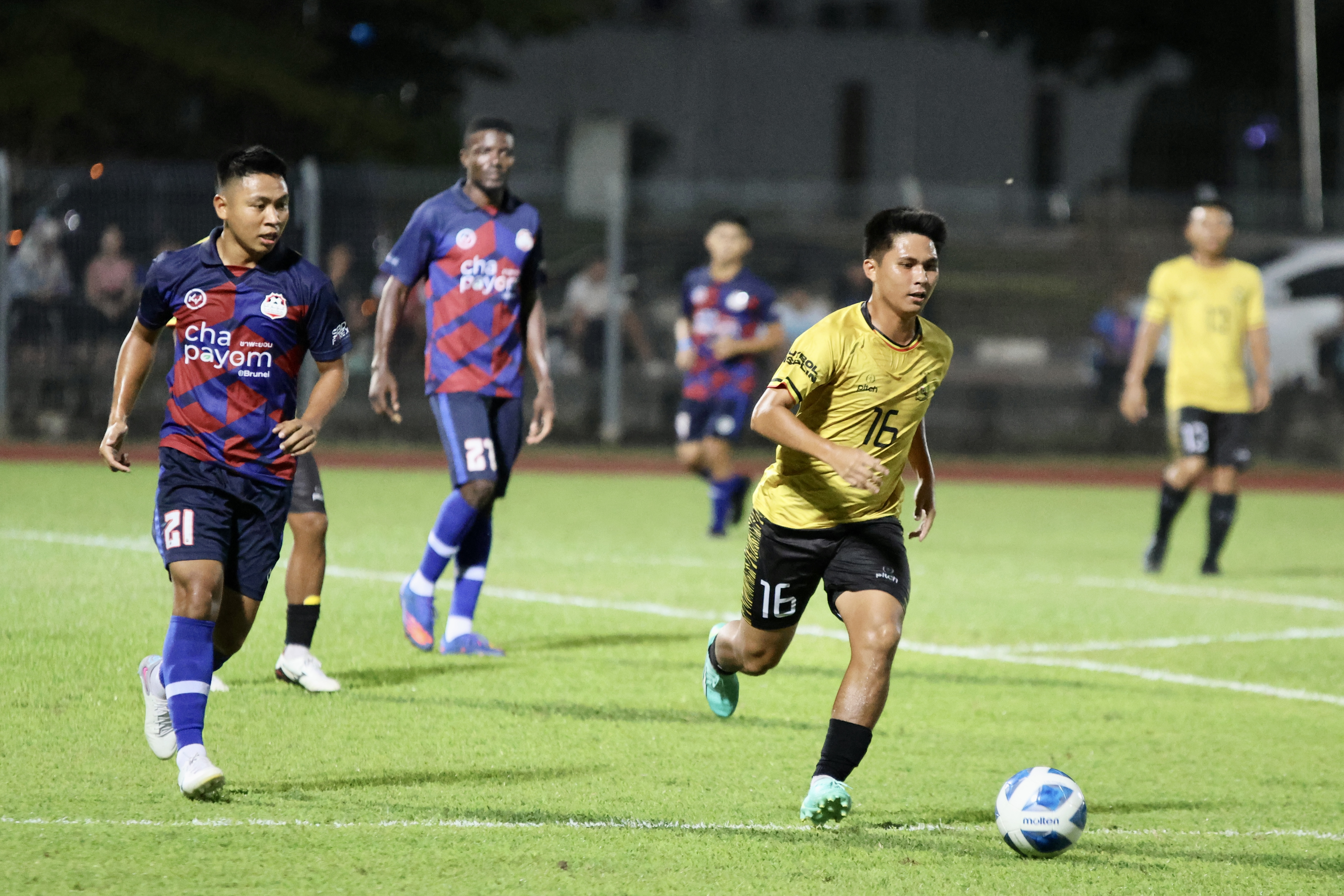
- Match between Kasuka and ABDB
- Season: 2023
- Champions: Kasuka FC (1st title)
- Matches: 126
- Goals: 503 (3.99 per match)
- Top goalscorer: (Liberia) Leon Taylor (31 goals)
- Biggest home win: Kasuka 8–1 Jerudong; AKSE Bersatu 8–1 Jerudong
- Biggest away win: Lun Bawang 0–11 Kasuka

The 2023 Brunei Super League was the ninth season of the Brunei Super League, the top football league in Brunei since its establishment in 2012. The league began in March and concluded in November, contested by 16 teams.

On 15 September 2023, the league was announced to have a premature conclusion due to insufficient funds as announced by FABD in a press release. The table on 17 November after all teams have played 16 matches became the final standing of the league.

After being unbeaten in 16 games Kasuka FC became the champions of the league.

== Teams ==
For this season, the number of teams will be restored to 16. DPMM FC will not be participating due to their imminent re-entry into the Singapore Premier League. Due to the withdrawals of representatives from the Belait and Tutong districts, AKSE Bersatu and Lun Bawang FC automatically became the two promoted sides.

Club	Head coach	Captain	Kit manufacturer	Shirt sponsor
AKSE Bersatu	(Brunei) Rosanan Samak	(Nigeria) Babatunde Abiodun	(Brunei) Pitch	HiTUNE Group
BAKES FC	(Brunei) Endy Azri Idris	(Brunei) Razi Lamit	(Brunei) Aewon	Asadel Enterprise
BSRC FC	(Brunei) Abdul Afiz Morney	(Brunei) Hazwan Akmal Zamri		Tendrill International
IKLS-MB5 FC	(Brunei) Ariffin Sulaiman	(Brunei) Kurmin Bini	(Brunei) Street Brigade Co.	WARR FX
Indera SC	(Nigeria) Mba Vitus Onyekachi	(Brunei) Amirul Hakeem Kasim	(Brunei) Aewon	Mid Valley Shopping Centre
Jerudong FC	(Brunei) Julkifli Hitam	(Brunei) Atifuddin Momin	(Germany) Adidas (Malaysia) Panzer	
Kasuka FC	(Brunei) Ali Mustafa	(Brunei) Maududi Hilmi Kasmi	(Malaysia) Kaki Jersi	Chapayom
KB FC	(Brunei) Kambri Rambli	(Brunei) Azizul Syafiee Tajul Ariffin	(Brunei) Pitch	
Kota Ranger FC	(Brunei) Zulkefly Duraman	(Brunei) Noorzaimin Zaini	(Brunei) Pitch	
Lun Bawang FC	(Brunei) Aminuddin Jumat	(Brunei) Alizanda Sitom	(Indonesia) Tactic (Germany) Adidas	Tactic Sportwear
MS ABDB	(Brunei) Yusof Matyassin	(Brunei) Saiful Ammar Adis	(Brunei) Pitch	
MS PPDB	(Brunei) Zulkhairi Salleh	(Brunei) Fazizzul Hussin	(Thailand) Cadenza (Brunei) Pitch	
Panchor Murai FC	(Brunei) Nurfadzillah Yussof	(Brunei) Army Mazhisham Muhammad	(Malaysia) Eagle	HYS Tindulang; Elyn Wedding Atelier
Rimba Star FC	(Brunei) Hassanuddin Damit	(Brunei) Esmady Brahim	(Brunei) FS Create (Indonesia) Kick Apparel	FS Create; Kick Apparel
Setia Perdana FC	(Brunei) Sofrin Serudin	(Brunei) Khairul Abdul Halim	(Brunei) Aewon	Aewon
Wijaya FC	(Brunei) Erni Hakim	(Brunei) Jamrin Johari	(Germany) Adidas	

== Foreign players ==
Club	Player 1	Player 2	Player 3	Player 4	AFC Player	Former Players
AKSE Bersatu	(Nigeria) Babatunde Abiodun	(Ivory Coast) Vouzon Junior	(Nigeria) Kelvin Momoh		(Malaysia) Malone Bian Andrew	(England) Simeon Williams
BAKES FC	(Morocco) Mohcine El Araichi				(Indonesia) Indra Kurniawan	
BSRC FC						
IKLS-MB5						
Indera SC	(Morocco) Zineddine Rafik	(Nigeria) Micheal Henry	(Liberia) Leon Sullivan Taylor	(Nigeria) George Olatunde		
Jerudong FC	(Nigeria) Auwal Kabara				(Indonesia) Yansen Effendi	(Nigeria) Mubarak Abubakar (Ghana) Daniel Asamoah
Kasuka FC	(Ghana) Samuel Kojo Abbey	(Ghana) Bismark Owusu				(Japan) Aoi Isami (Ivory Coast) Adama Coulibaly (Brazil) Rosalvo Cândido
KB FC	(Nepal) Aakash Thapa				(Nepal) Bibek Tamang	
Kota Ranger	(Nigeria) Kasali Ganiu	(Timor-Leste) Elias Mesquita	(Nigeria) Nonso Nwoke	(Nigeria) Mohammed Sa'ad		(Nigeria) Hammed Okikiola (Japan) Shun Kamino
Lun Bawang						
MS ABDB	MS ABDB (Royal Brunei Armed Forces) and MS PPDB (Royal Brunei Police Force) do not field foreigners					
MS PPDB	MS ABDB (Royal Brunei Armed Forces) and MS PPDB (Royal Brunei Police Force) do not field foreigners					
Panchor Murai						
Rimba Star	(Nigeria) Hammed Okikiola	(Canada) Alexander Weber	(Indonesia) Amir Hamzah	(Malaysia) Ridhwan Roslan	(Indonesia) Bintang Arrahim	(Ivory Coast) Christian Kouassi (Spain) Antonio Lee
Setia Perdana						
Wijaya						

== League table ==
Pos	Team	Pld	W	D	L	GF	GA	GD	Pts	Qualification or relegation
1	Kasuka (C)	16	16	0	0	88	7	+81	48	Qualification for the 2024–25 ASEAN Club Championship qualifying play-offs
2	Indera	16	13	2	1	69	9	+60	41	
3	Kota Ranger	16	13	2	1	39	10	+29	41	
4	MS ABDB	16	10	3	3	45	12	+33	33	
5	AKSE Bersatu	16	10	2	4	47	15	+32	32	
6	Kuala Belait	16	10	2	4	21	15	+6	32	
7	MS PPDB	16	10	0	6	42	18	+24	30	
8	IKLS-MB5	16	6	3	7	28	36	−8	21	Withrew Next Season
9	Wijaya	16	7	0	9	26	34	−8	21	
10	Rimba Star	16	6	0	10	28	29	−1	18	
11	Lun Bawang	16	5	1	10	17	45	−28	16	
12	Panchor Murai	16	3	1	12	14	53	−39	10	
13	BAKES	16	2	3	11	14	57	−43	9	Withrew Next Season
14	Setia Perdana	16	2	2	12	8	64	−56	8	Relegation to 2024 Brunei District League
15	BSRC	16	2	1	13	7	38	−31	7	
16	Jerudong	16	2	0	14	18	69	−51	6	

Source: FABD
Rules for classification: 1) Points; 2) Goal difference; 3) Goals scored; 4) Head-to-head result; 5) Head-to-head goal difference; 6) Head-to-head goals scored.
(C) Champions

=== Position by round ===
Team ╲ Round	1	2	3	4	5	6	7	8	9	10	11	12	13	14	15	16	Final
Kasuka	2	2	2	2	1	1	1	1	1	1	1	1	1	1	1	1	1
Indera	8	8	9	9	6	3	2	2	2	2	2	2	2	2	2	2	2
Kota Ranger	6	6	8	6	5	6	5	3	3	3	4	6	6	6	7	7	3
MS ABDB	9	11	7	4	4	5	7	6	4	5	6	5	3	3	5	5	4
AKSE	5	3	3	3	3	2	4	8	8	7	3	3	5	5	3	3	5
Kuala Belait	4	7	4	5	7	9	10	9	10	8	8	8	7	7	4	4	6
MS PPDB	15	9	12	12	9	7	6	4	5	4	5	4	4	4	6	6	7
IKLS-MB5	3	5	6	8	12	8	8	7	7	9	9	9	9	9	9	9	8
Wijaya	1	1	1	1	2	4	3	5	6	6	7	7	8	8	8	8	9
Rimba Star	12	14	15	11	8	10	9	10	9	10	10	10	10	10	10	10	10
Lun Bawang	14	16	10	15	11	13	13	13	13	11	11	11	12	11	11	11	11
Panchor Murai	7	4	5	7	10	12	11	11	12	13	13	14	11	12	12	12	12
BAKES	10	12	14	16	13	14	15	14	15	15	15	16	16	13	13	13	13
Setia Perdana	16	10	13	10	14	15	14	15	11	12	12	12	13	14	14	14	14
BSRC	11	15	11	13	16	16	16	16	16	16	16	13	14	15	15	15	15
Jerudong	13	13	16	14	15	11	12	12	14	14	14	15	15	16	16	16	16

Table Leader

Source: FABD

== Season statistics ==
=== Top scorers ===
Rank	Player	Team	Goals
1	(Liberia) Leon Sullivan Taylor	Indera	31
2	(Brunei) Adi Said	Kasuka	23
3	(Brazil) Rosalvo Cândido	Kasuka	15
4	(Ivory Coast) Vouzon Junior	AKSE	13
5	(Brunei) Nor Hidayatullah Zaini	IKLS-MB5	12
6	(Ghana) Bismark Owusu	Kasuka	11
7	(Indonesia) Amir Hamzah	Rimba Star	10
8	(Brunei) Fazizzul Hussin	PPDB	9
8	(Brunei) Hariz Danial Khallidden	ABDB	9
10	(Brunei) Abdul Azim Abdul Rasid	PPDB	8
10	(Nigeria) Babatunde Abiodun	AKSE	8
10	(Brunei) Nur Hidayat Abbas	AKSE	8
10	(Morocco) Zineddine Rafik	Indera	8

=== Hat-tricks ===
Player	For	Against	Score	Date
(Brunei) Marhazif Ahad	Wijaya	Setia Perdana	6–0	5 March 2023
(Brunei) Hazrul Mohammed	AKSE	Panchor Murai	7–1	14 March 2023
(Indonesia) Amir Hamzah	Rimba Star	IKLS-MB5	5–2	14 March 2023
(Brunei) Haziq Baihaqi Abdullah	PPDB	Panchor Murai	4–1	28 May 2023
(Ghana) Bismark Owusu	Kasuka	BAKES	8–1	28 May 2023
(Liberia) Leon Sullivan Taylor	Indera	BSRC	6–0	4 June 2023
(Brazil) Rosalvo Cândido	Kasuka	Jerudong	8–1	26 June 2023
(Brunei) Adi Said	Kasuka	Jerudong	8–1	26 June 2023
(Brunei) Abdul Azim Abdul Rasid	PPDB	Setia Perdana	6–0	26 June 2023
(Brunei) Aimmil Rahman Ramlee	Indera	Panchor Murai	10–0	2 July 2023
(Brunei) Nizamuddin Ismail	PPDB	IKLS-MB5	6–0	5 July 2023
(Nigeria) Babatunde Abiodun	AKSE	Jerudong	6–1	7 July 2023
(Liberia) Leon Sullivan Taylor	Indera	BAKES	6–0	9 July 2023
(Morocco) Zineddine Rafik	Indera	Setia Perdana	9–0	21 July 2023
(Ghana) Bismark Owusu	Kasuka	Lun Bawang	11–0	30 July 2023
(Brunei) Adi Said	Kasuka	Wijaya	8–1	2 August 2023
(Liberia) Leon Sullivan Taylor	Indera	Jerudong	10–0	6 August 2023
(Brazil) Rosalvo Cândido	Kasuka	Setia Perdana	10–0	6 August 2023
(Brunei) Nor Hidayatullah Zaini	IKLS-MB5	Setia Perdana	7–1	11 August 2023
(Ivory Coast) Vouzon Junior	AKSE	Setia Perdana	5–1	20 August 2023
(Brunei) Nur Hidayat Abbas	AKSE	Jerudong	8–1	25 August 2023
(Ivory Coast) Vouzon Junior	AKSE	Jerudong	8–1	25 August 2023
(Liberia) Leon Sullivan Taylor	Indera	BAKES	10–0	27 August 2023
(Brunei) Nur Asyraffahmi Norsamri	Kasuka	Panchor Murai	9–0	27 August 2023

== Awards ==
Award	Name	Club	Ref
Player of the Season	(Brunei) Adi Said	Kasuka FC	
Top Scorer	(Liberia) Leon Sullivan Taylor	Kasuka FC	
Best Under-21 Player	(Brunei) Haziq Naqiuddin Syamra	Kota Ranger FC	
Coach of the Season	(Brunei) Ali Mustafa	Kasuka FC	
Fair Play Award	Kasuka FC		
