= COVID-19 pandemic in Brunei =

Aspect of viral disease pandemic

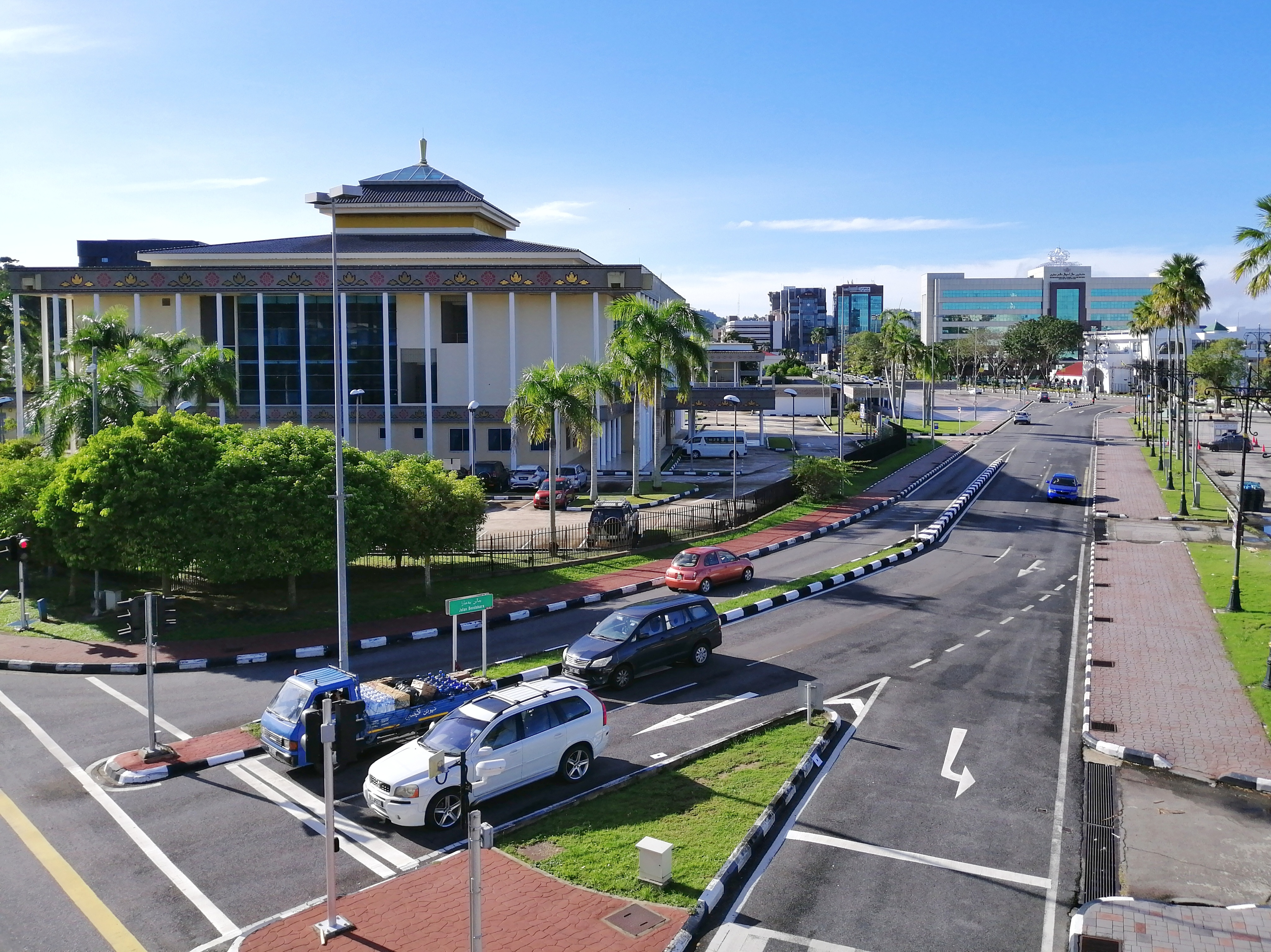
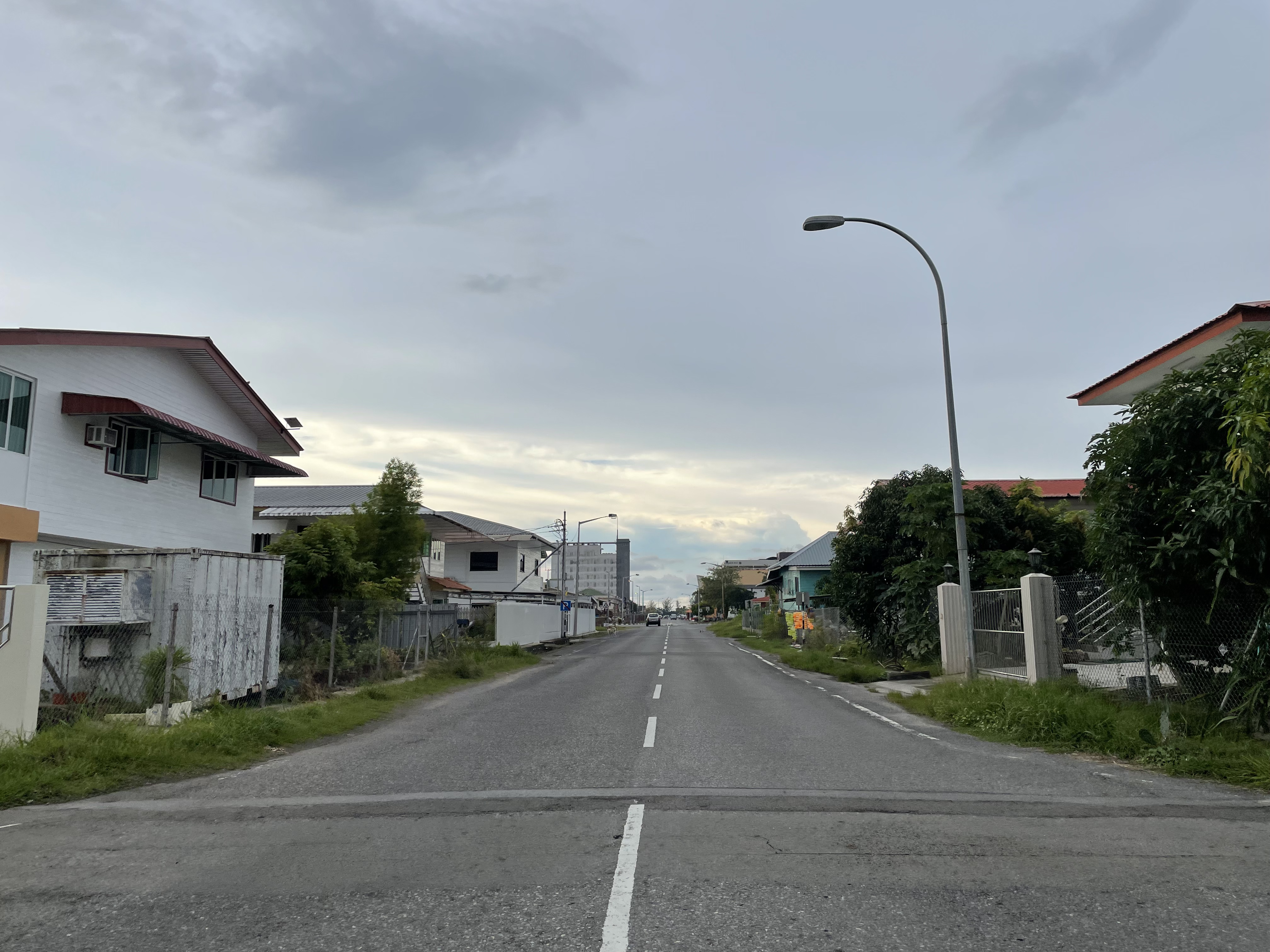
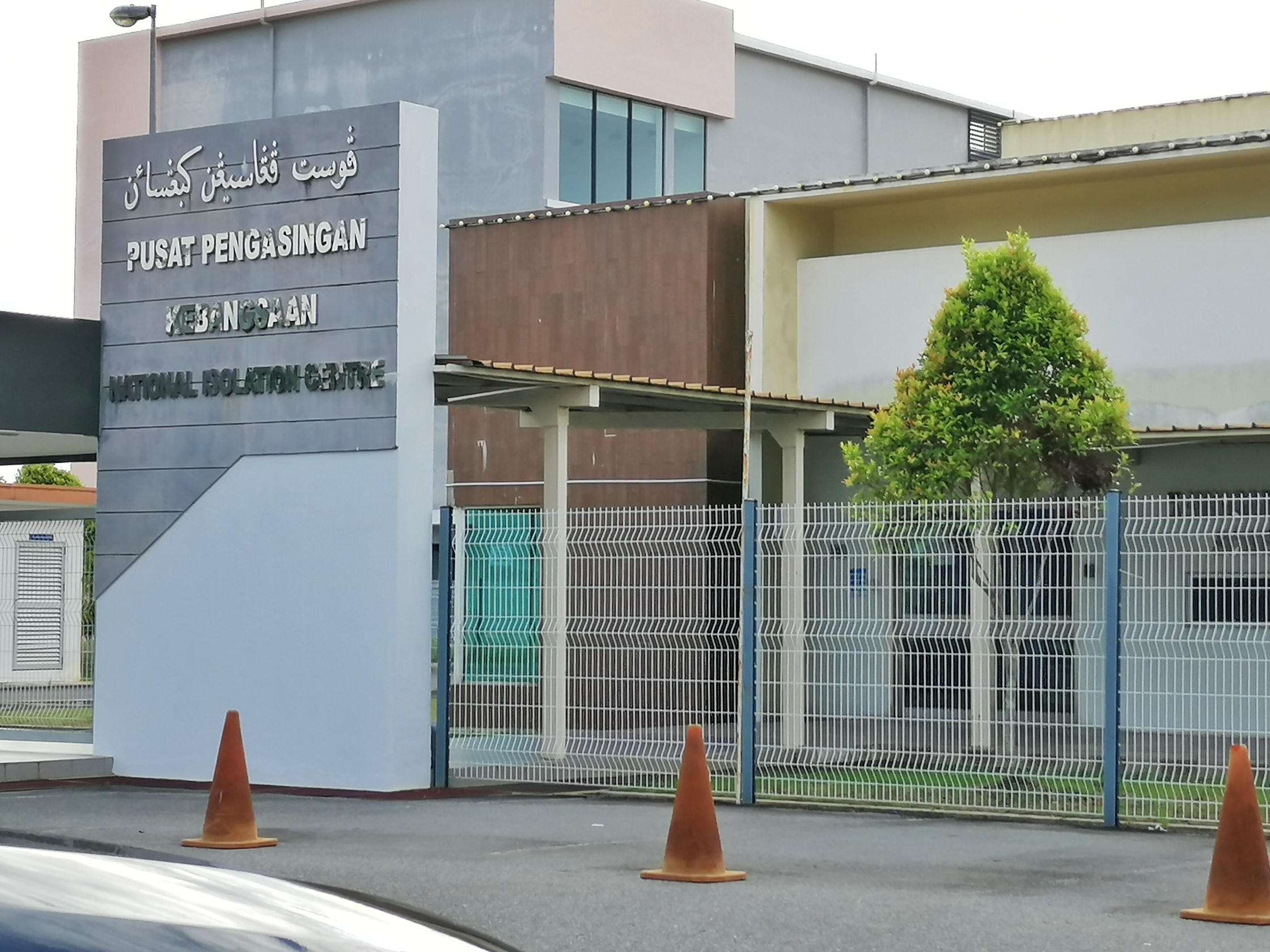
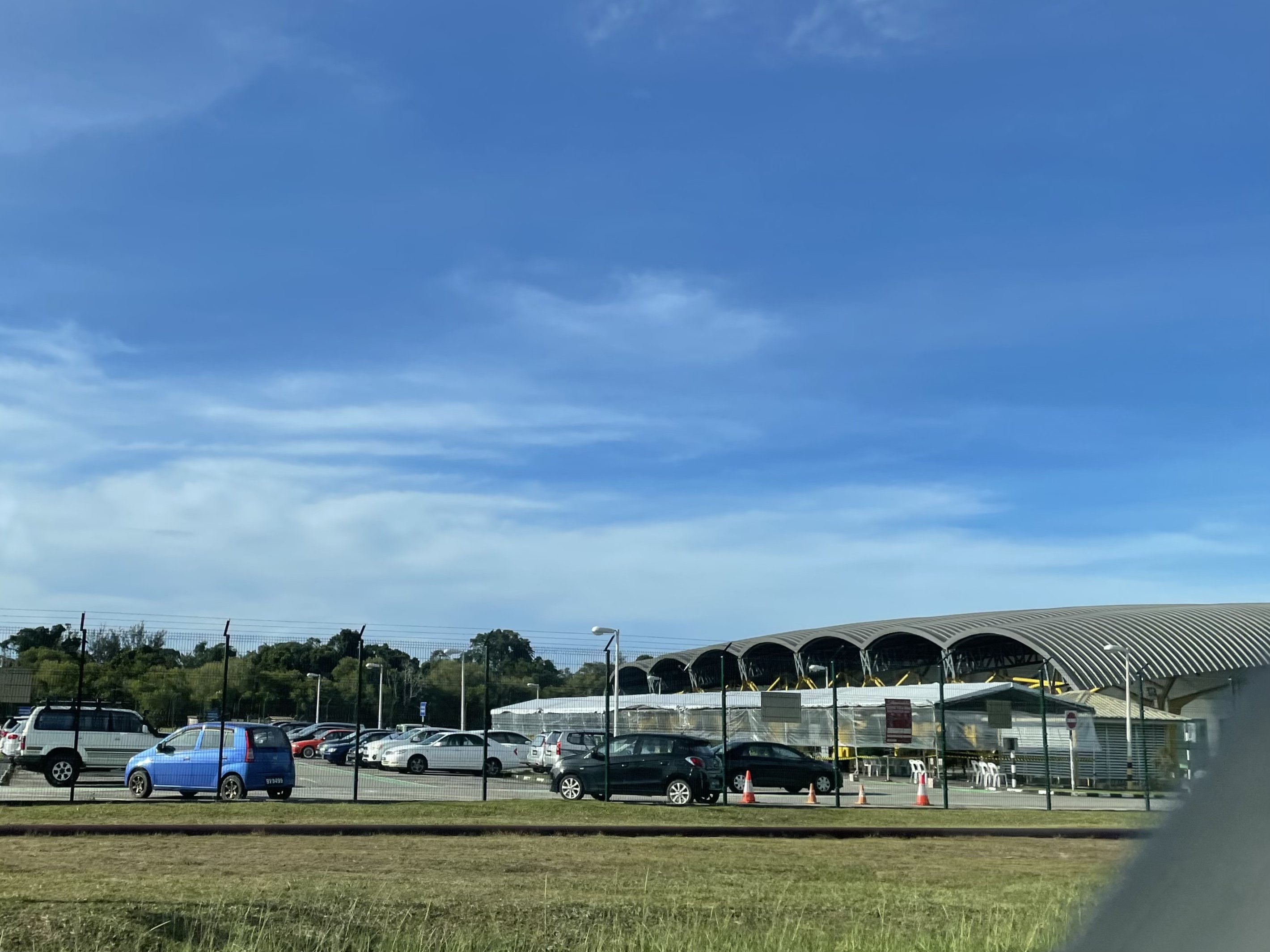
- (clockwise from top left): Near empty streets of Pusat Bandar and Seria; Nasopharyngeal swab tents at Anduki Airfield; National Isolation Centre
- Disease: COVID-19
- Pathogen: SARS-CoV-2
- Location: Brunei
- First outbreak: Wuhan, Hubei, China
- Index case: Tutong (Note: The first case was initially treated at the Raja Isteri Pengiran Anak Saleha Hospital in Bandar Seri Begawan before being moved to the National Isolation Centre in Tutong where he was when the case was first announced.)
- Arrival date: 9 March 2020 (6 years, 7 months and 24 days)
- Confirmed cases: 350,550
- Recovered: 308,552 (updated 27 June 2023)
- Deaths: 182
- Fatality rate: 0.42%

Government website
- www.healthinfo.gov.bn/covid19

The COVID-19 pandemic in Brunei was a part of the worldwide pandemic of coronavirus disease 2019 (COVID-19) caused by severe acute respiratory syndrome coronavirus 2 (SARS-CoV-2). The spread of the virus to Brunei was first identified on 9 March 2020, when its first case was confirmed in Tutong. Many early cases were linked to Jamek Mosque Sri Petaling in Kuala Lumpur, which held a large Tablighi Jamaat ijtema event at the end of February 2020. Of Brunei's first 50 cases, 45 were related to Jamek Mosque. The pandemic subsequently spread to all districts of Brunei. As of October 13, 2026, there have been 350,550 confirmed cases of COVID-19 reported in Brunei, resulting in 182 fatalities.

== Background ==
On 12 January 2020, the World Health Organization (WHO) confirmed that a novel coronavirus was the cause of a respiratory illness in a cluster of people in Wuhan City, Hubei Province, China, which was reported to the WHO on 31 December 2019. The case fatality ratio for COVID-19 has been much lower than SARS of 2003, but the transmission has been significantly greater, with a significant total death toll.

== First wave of COVID-19 ==
On 9 March 2020, the Ministry of Health (MoH) confirmed the first case of COVID-19 in Brunei, a 53-year-old man who had returned from a tabligh in Kuala Lumpur, Malaysia, on 3 March. He began experiencing symptoms on 7 March and was subsequently admitted to the National Isolation Centre in Tutong. The MoH began tracing his three travel companions and family members. By 10 March, five additional cases were reported, all of whom were close contacts of the initial patient, bringing the total to six. The following day, five more cases were confirmed, raising the total to 11, with three linked to the Kuala Lumpur gathering. On 12 March, the MoH reported 14 new cases, bringing the total to 25, with ten linked to the same event and one involving a man who had traveled to Kuala Lumpur and Cambodia. By 14 March, the number of cases had risen to 40, and by 15 March, to 50 with an additional 10 confirmed cases. The situation escalated, and on 22 March, the total reached 88. The next day, three more cases brought the total to 91, and on 24 March, a record 13 new cases were confirmed, resulting in a total of 104. By 25 March, the total was 109, and on 26 March, it increased to 114 with five recoveries reported. On 27 March, the case count reached 115, with 11 recoveries, but also marked the first death due to the virus.

On 5 May, Brunei confirmed one new COVID-19 case, raising the total number of active cases to 139. The following day, two additional related cases were detected, linked to the previous day's case. By 2 June, most schools in the country partially reopened, and the majority of classes resumed as normal. However, on 7 August, Brunei reported its first imported case after 91 days of zero positive cases; the individual was a local man who had traveled from Yemen. On 23 November, the MoH announced the detection of another COVID-19 case in Brunei. Case 149 involved a 37-year-old woman who had arrived on flight BI874 from Kuala Lumpur after transiting from India on 11 November. She was asymptomatic, and contact tracing identified three close contacts, all of whom tested negative for the virus, while results for another close contact were still pending at the time of the press release. The following day, the MoH confirmed another case, Case 150, which was a 37-year-old man who arrived on the same flight from Kuala Lumpur after transiting from Egypt on 13 November. Like the previous case, he was asymptomatic, and contact tracing revealed five close contacts, all of whom tested negative for COVID-19.

On 1 December, the MoH announced the detection of another COVID-19 case in Brunei. Case 151 involved a 26-year-old woman who arrived on flight BI874 from Kuala Lumpur after transiting from Nepal on 20 November. She was asymptomatic, and contact tracing identified two close contacts, both of whom tested negative for the virus. A week later, on 8 December, the MoH reported yet another case, Case 152, which was a 39-year-old man who arrived on the same flight from Kuala Lumpur on 27 November. This patient was also asymptomatic, and contact tracing revealed six close contacts, all of whom tested negative for COVID-19.

On 3 January 2021, the MoH announced the detection of 15 new COVID-19 cases in Brunei, all of which involved males aged 19 to 21 who had arrived on flight BI004 from London on 21 December 2020. These individuals were part of a group of 81, with Case 165 showing symptoms starting on 31 December 2020, while the others remained asymptomatic. To help Bruneians adjust to the new normal, the MoH announced some easing of restrictions on 7 March 2021, allowing gatherings of up to 1,000 attendees, an increase from the previous limit of 350. Cinemas, restaurants, daycare facilities, libraries, mosques, gyms, and swimming pools were also permitted to operate at full capacity. By March 2021, the government lifted most restrictions, confident that the COVID-19 outbreak was under control. On 21 June, Brunei received its first shipment of the Moderna COVID-19 vaccine, totalling 50,400 doses out of the 200,000 procured by the MoH.

== Second wave of COVID-19 ==
With seven domestically transmitted cases reported on 7 August 2021, Brunei experienced a sharp increase in COVID-19 infections, prompting the reinstatement of stringent regulations. By August 18, there were a record 513 confirmed cases, which prompted Sultan Hassanal Bolkiah to speak to the country and call for repentance and prayer for Brunei's safety. On 18 September, the government began widespread swabbing to identify illnesses in response to the continuous rise in cases. On 17 October, the number of confirmed cases peaked, with 504 cases recorded in a single day. Due to the prompt reintroduction of strict controls, case numbers started to decrease even if they were still higher than during the first wave.

With commitments from Australia and Japan for 100,000 doses each, it was confirmed on 18 September that AstraZeneca would be the country's default vaccination. Initially restricted to individuals aged sixty and up, AstraZeneca was incorporated into Brunei's bulk vaccination initiative. However, a vaccine shortage forced a temporary halt to the mass immunisation effort on 1 September. The MoH announced that priority for the second vaccine dose would be given to vulnerable groups, including the elderly, pregnant women, and disabled individuals, until the supply situation improves. The following day, the MoH revealed ongoing negotiations with Singapore to arrange a vaccine trade. This process is complicated, as Brunei must also seek approval from both the vaccine manufacturers and the Singaporean government. Once another 100,000 doses of Sinopharm provided by China arrived on 12 September, the program was able to begin on 16 September. Notably, Brunei had received a donation of 100,000 doses of the Moderna vaccine from Singapore earlier on 20 August.

Due mostly to vaccine shortages, by August 2021, just 30.3% of the population had gotten their first dosage of Brunei's mass immunisation campaign for both citizens and tourists. On 2 October, the MoH announced intentions to boost daily inoculations from 7,020 to 10,000 doses in response to the daily increase in COVID-19 cases. Beginning on 26 September, walk-in vaccinations were permitted in order to speed up the procedure. Teens between the ages of 12 and 17 started receiving vaccines on 9 November; by 15 November, 70% of the population had gotten their double doses, resulting in 301,503 completely immunised people. By 31 December 2021, 21.4% of Bruneians had gotten booster shots, and 93.3% of the population had received their double dosage.

The government announced a three-phase lockdown escape plan on 26 October as the number of patients started to steadily decrease from the peak on 17 October and mass vaccinations intensified. The nation launched its Transition Phase under the National COVID-19 Recovery Program on 19 November. This featured a partial reopening of the economy and additional relaxation of restrictions. All immunized individuals were permitted to resume their jobs, and dining establishments reopened. As of 30 December, there were 15,470 COVID-19 infections in Brunei, resulting in 98 fatalities. Similarly, on 23 December, Brunei reported its first case of the extremely contagious Omicron coronavirus type.

Brunei has stopped daily reporting of COVID-19 cases in the country, effective 22 June 2022.

== Distribution ==
Distribution of cumulative confirmed cases in Brunei (As of 18 September 2021)
Districts		Confirmed	Active	Recovered	Deceased
1	Brunei-Muara	9822	401	9348	31
2	Belait	3846	32	3790	24
3	Tutong	1197	38	1157	2
4	Temburong	228	16	212	0
Total		15093	487	14507	57

== Reactions ==
In late January, Brunei announced entry restrictions for people coming from China. Starting February 1, temperature screening was implemented on entry to the country. Royal Brunei Airlines reduced flights to China. In response to the COVID-19 pandemic, the Ministry of Education announced that the first school term break scheduled for 16 March 2020 would be moved forward to 11 March.

On 14 March, the Brunei Ministry of Health ordered 638 people to go into quarantine. The Ministry has also stepped up efforts to track more close contacts of positive cases.

On 15 March, the Bruneian Government barred all citizens and foreign residents from leaving as a result of the COVID-19 pandemic. The Ministry of Health has also banned mass gatherings including weddings and sporting events. In addition the National Football Association of Brunei Darussalam, the Tutong District Amateur Football Association League, and the Brunei Basketball Association suspended all matches and games.

On 16 March, the Ministry of Religious Affairs announced a one-week closure for all mosques in the country, from 17 March until 23 March, and the Friday prayers which coincided with this time were suspended. However, the adhan or Islamic prayer calls would still be conducted. The Bruneian Government also announced that the Temburong Bridge would be opened on the following day, earlier than scheduled, to ease travelling to the Temburong District exclave after the government announced outbound travel ban. Previously, commuters have to drive through the Malaysian Limbang District or take passenger ferry services. At initial opening, the bridge was opened from 6 am to 10 pm and traffic is only allowed for Brunei-registered vehicles. However, on the first day of opening, citizens were seen flocking to Temburong, taking advantage of the bridge for pleasure purposes. The government then changed the opening time of the bridge to 6 am to 6 pm as a precautionary measure to reduce the spread of COVID. On 23 May 2020 the opening hours of the bridge were extended back to their original times.
