= Robbie Servais =

Dutch footballer and manager

Personal information
- Date of birth: 8 March 1976 (age 50)
- Place of birth: Maastricht, Netherlands
- Position: Midfielder

Team information
- Current team: MVV Maastricht (assistant); MVV Maastricht (U-21 manager)

Youth career
- 1990–1997: MVV Maastricht

Senior career*
Years	Team	Apps	(Gls)
1997–2003	SV Meerssen		
2003–2005	Schijndel SBA/Euro		
2005–2006	VV Baronie		
2006–2007	Song Lam Nghe An		

Managerial career
- 2009–2010: Vissel Kobe (assistant)
- 2012–2014: Omiya Ardija (youth)
- 2015–2016: Singapore Sports School
- 2017: Singapore U-23 (assistant)
- 2018: Singapore U-19
- 2018: Australia (assistant)
- 2019: Brunei
- 2019–: MVV Maastricht (assistant)
- 2020–: MVV Maastricht (U-21 manager)
- * Club domestic league appearances and goals

Robbie Servais (born 8 March 1976) is a former Dutch footballer and current assistant manager of MVV Maastricht.

== Club career ==
Born in Maastricht, Servais was involved in the youth set-up at hometown club MVV Maastricht. Whilst studying at Maastricht University, Servais joined SV Meerssen, playing under Bert van Marwijk. Following a six-year spell at Meerssen, Servais played for Hoofdklasse clubs Schijndel SBA/Euro and VV Baronie. At the end of his career, Servais moved to Vietnam to play for Song Lam Nghe An.

== Managerial career ==
In 2018, Servais managed Singapore U19. During the 2018 FIFA World Cup, Servais was a part of former manager Bert van Marwijk's backroom staff for Australia. In May 2019, Servais was appointed manager of Brunei.

In the summer 2019, Servais was appointed assistant manager of Fuat Usta at MVV Maastricht. He also took charge of MVV's U-19 squad from the summer 2020. On 30 March 2021, Servais signed a new two-year deal with MVV, continuing as a part-time first team assistant coach and full-time U-21 manager.
