= Indera SC =

Bruneian sports club

- Full name: Indera Sports Club
- Short name: ISC
- Founded: 1970; 56 years ago, as Kilat FC
- Chairman: Mohd Yassin Safiuddin
- Head coach: Lindsay Henderson
- League: Brunei Super League
- 2025–26: 1st
Home colours	Away colours

Indera Sports Club (Malay: Kelab Sukan Indera; abbrev: ISC), formerly Kilat FC and Indera Football Association, is a multi-sports club based in Brunei, mostly known for its association football team.

== History ==
=== Early years ===
Kilat FC was founded in 1970 by nobleman Pengiran Anak Hassanuddin Al-Haj bin Pengiran Anak Safiuddin with his siblings, and was based in Kilanas. The club underwent several name changes Indera Football Association and Indera Football Club. Over the years they became an established force in the local football scene, winning district-level championships in the seventies and eighties.

=== Success in Brunei ===
In 2002, Indera became one of the teams that featured in the inaugural Proton B-League, but finished fifth in their group and failed to advance to the second stage. They accomplished this the next season, finishing in sixth place. They then made eighth place for the next three seasons, in risk of relegation to the Premier II, the second level of the Brunei league structure then. In the 2009–10 season, the team was boosted by the arrivals of Sairol Sahari, Azwan Saleh and Helmi Zambin on loan from DPMM FC, ultimately faring much better in sixth place.

In early 2010, the club management decided to change its name to Indera Sports Club to incorporate other disciplines such as futsal, badminton and netball. The football team entered the Brunei Super League as a founding member in 2012, winning the championship thanks to stellar performances by future Brunei stars such as Azwan Ali Rahman, Nurikhwan Othman and Abdul Mu'iz Sisa, with the astute signing of Hamizan Aziz Sulaiman from QAF FC the previous year also becoming a major contributing factor. They won both Super League championships in 2013 and 2014. They had their biggest win by demolishing Najip FC 20–1 in the 2013 Super League. During the 2014 Super League, Indera retained the championship, with a solitary defeat to MS ABDB their only blemish all season.

The 2015 Super League match between Indera and Tabuan Muda on 25 October was prematurely called off after a third sending off for Indera left them with just eight players on the field. The referee adjudged that Tabuan Muda be given a 3–0 win due to not enough opposition players but it was contrary to the league rules which was based on the Laws of the Game that the judgement should have been ruled when the opposition is reduced to seven players. A rematch was granted almost a month later but Tabuan Muda themselves did not adequately show up for the match, resulting in a 3–0 walkover to Indera and a fine for the Brunei national youth team. The team came in second place to MS ABDB, the football team of the Royal Brunei Armed Forces.

Despite losing their championship to MS ABDB in the Super League that year, Indera defeated them 2–0 at the Hassanal Bolkiah National Stadium at the 2015 DST Sumbangsih Cup match. Both Sam Ford and Hamizan Aziz Sulaiman scored the goals for ISC after half-time.

Indera won the 2017–18 FA Cup after Zulkhairy Razali and Asri Aspar's goals clinched it against MS PDB. They would proceed to win the following 2018 Super Cup after a 2–1 victory against MS ABDB that same year.

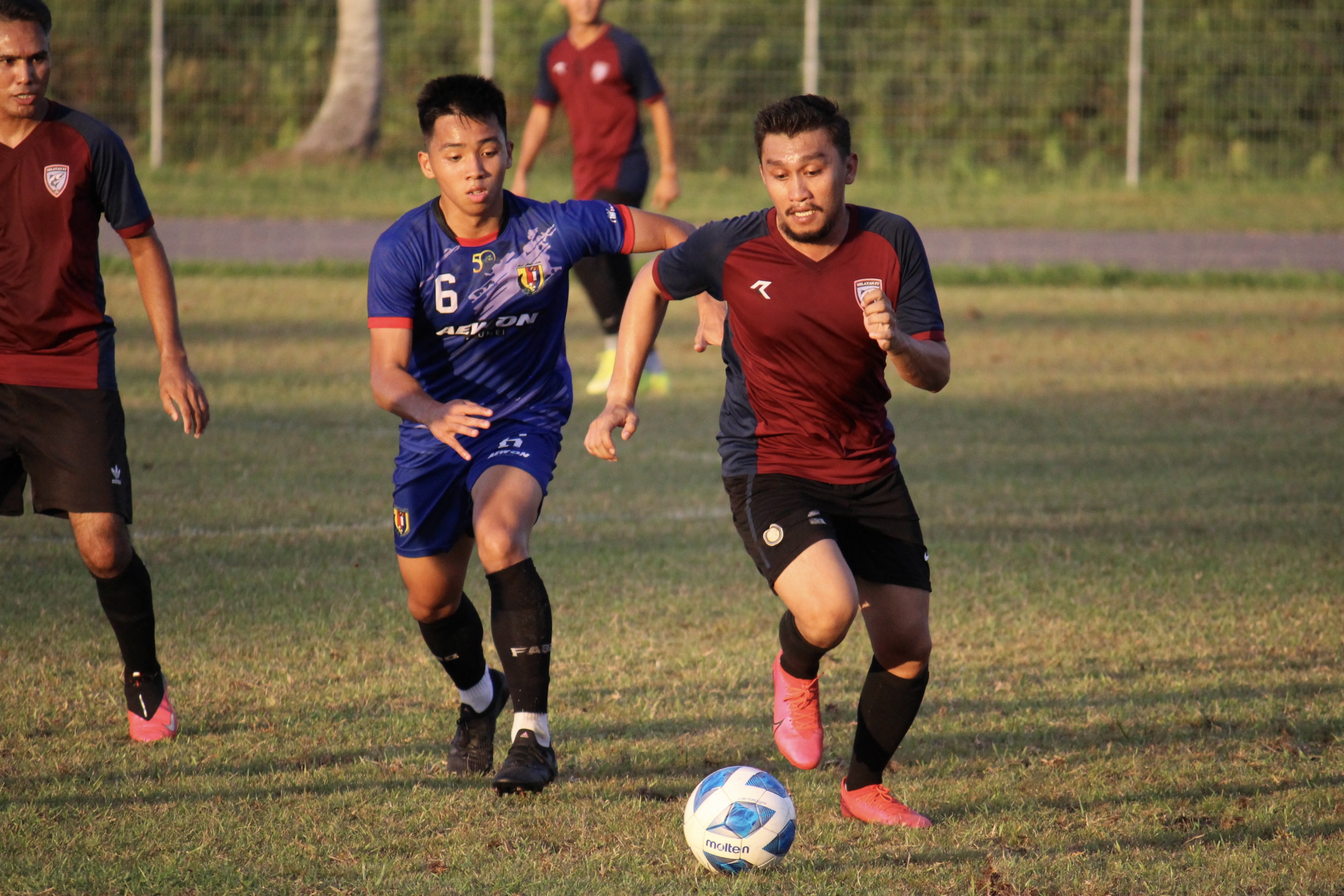
Indera's Syafiq Safiuddin during a friendly match against Nelayan FT in 2022.

=== 2020 AFC Cup ===
Indera SC made their regional competition debut at the 2020 Asian Football Confederation (AFC) Cup. On 13 December 2019, the club officially announced the signing of four foreign players prior to their second leg knockout against Yangon United. The players were Rodrigo Tosi, Marcelo Carvalho de Souza, Prince Yamoah Boafo and Tekson Tubeng. During the first leg of the play-offs, Indera was thrashed 1–6 by Yangon United at the Hassanal Bolkiah National Stadium. In the second leg, they were defeated 3–1 again. The club was sent home after an aggregated 9–1 loss.

=== Recent results ===
The club was at 7th place in the 2020 Super League when it was unexpectedly postponed and eventually cancelled due to the ongoing COVID-19 pandemic in the country, ending the tournament with only two matches completed. This would occur again prior to the 2021 Super League following to the restrictions reapplied by the Ministry of Health, and finally abandoned after orders made by the Football Association of Brunei Darussalam (FABD). That following year, the restrictions were lifted and it enabled Indera to participate in the 2022 FA Cup, the only football tournament held by the FABD for the year. ISC would only make it as far as the quarter finals after two devastating losses, 5–1 and 8–0 against DPMM FC.

In the 2023 season, Indera finished as runners-up in the league after 16 games, behind Kasuka FC. With the entry of the second team of DPMM FC starting from the 2024–25 season, Indera would finish one place lower in the standings although the acquisition of decorated midfielder Hendra Azam Idris was a highlight of their campaign.

In the 2025 Brunei FA Cup, Indera managed to advance to the finals of the competition on 18 May where they were beaten 1–0 by DPMM II.

In the 2025–26 season, Indera went toe-to-toe with defending champions Kasuka, and trailed them with only two points towards the final match of their season: a showdown to determine the championship at the Hassanal Bolkiah National Stadium on 19 April. A 3–2 victory courtesy of two goals from Akram Waqeel Bakri and a strike by Leon Sullivan Taylor meant that Indera claimed the title at the expense of their opponents who had been champions in the exact same way last campaign.

== Club crest ==
Its name having royal connotations, the colours in Indera's crest are those of the Bruneian royal family.

== Current squad ==
As of 14 September 2026

Note: Flags indicate national team as defined under FIFA eligibility rules; some limited exceptions apply. Players may hold more than one non-FIFA nationality.

No.	Pos.	Nation	Player
1	GK	CIV	Jean Daniel N'Goran
2	DF	BRU	Yazid Azmi (Vice-captain 2)
3	DF	BRU	Safwan Amaluddin Sabli
4	DF	BRU	Danial Hariz Syukrin
5	DF	BRU	Danish Aiman Sahrizul
6	MF	CMR	Alexis Ismael Effa
7	DF	BRU	Amirul Aizad Zaidi
8	MF	BRU	Hendra Azam Idris
9	MF	BRU	Amin Sisa
10	MF	BRU	Petrus Jumat
12	MF	BRU	Fuad Asy'ari Faisal
15	DF	NGR	Victor Ebele Jr.
16	DF	BRU	Abdul Aziz Hassan

No.	Pos.	Nation	Player
17	MF	BRU	Abdul Khair Basri (Captain)
18	DF	BRU	Abdul Basith Hussin
19	MF	NGR	Babatunde Abiodun
20	FW	GUI	Ibrahima Camara
21	FW	BRU	Aimmil Rahman Ramlee (Vice-captain 1)
22	GK	BRU	Ahsanuddin Dani
25	GK	BRU	Khairul Hisyam Norihwan
26	FW	BRU	Akram Waqeel Bakri
27	MF	BRU	Azim Hamidoon
29	FW	BRU	Azhari Danial Yusra
46	DF	BRU	Khalish Wa'ie Azman
47	MF	BRU	Hadi Aiman Hamizal

== Honours ==
- Brunei Super League
  - Champions (3): 2012–13, 2014, 2025–26
  - Runners-up (3): 2015, 2016, 2023
- Brunei FA Cup
  - Champions (1): 2017–18
  - Runners-up (3): 2012, 2015, 2025
- Piala Sumbangsih
  - Champions (2): 2015, 2018
  - Runners-up (3): 2014, 2016, 2017
- Brunei Pepsi Cup
  - Runners-up (1): 2005

== Continental record ==
Season	Competition	Round	Club	Home	Away	Aggregate
2020	AFC Cup	Qualifying play-off round	(Myanmar) Yangon United	1–6	3–1	2–9

== Indera Sports Club Academy ==
The Indera Sports Club Academy (ISCA) was founded as part of the club's Youth Development Programme on 28 April 2019. It is another significant step in the effective management of the ISC in inspiring a generation of players from the grassroots to the young level. According to the ISC head of Youth Development Roney Morni, the academy has attracted 100 players by 2020. The under (U)-19, U-16, U-12, U-10 and U-8 age groups are supervised and coached by 15 coaches, including four female trainers.
