= 2017–18 Brunei FA Cup =

Tournament details
- Country: Brunei

Final positions
- Champions: Indera SC

The 2017–18 Brunei FA Cup (also known as the DST FA Cup for sponsorship reasons) is the 11th edition of the Brunei FA Cup, the knockout football tournament in Brunei.

== First round ==
Team 1	Score	Team 2
5 November 2017
IKLS FC	5–0	Tunas FC
12 November 2017
Tabuan Muda 'B'	0–3	BSRC FT
19 November 2017
Panchor Mura FC	1–6	Tabuan A (U16)
DSP United	1–0	Rimba Star FC

== Second round ==
Team 1	Score	Team 2
5 January 2018
Setia Perdana	0–2	Tabuan A (U16)
7 January 2018
Lun Bawang FC	2–3	Jerudong FC
9 January 2018
Wijaya FC	5–1	BSRC FT
10 January 2018
Menglait FC	1–3	DSP United
14 January 2018
Tabuan Muda 'A'	2–4	MS ABDB
4 February 2018
Indera SC	4–1	IKLS FC
16 February 2018
MS PDB	4–1	Kota Ranger FC
17 February 2018
Najip I-Team	0–5	Kasuka FC

== Quarter-finals ==
Team 1	Score	Team 2
3 March 2018
Wijaya FC	3–4	Kasuka FC
9 March 2018
DSP United	0–3	MS ABDB
10 March 2018
Indera SC	2–0	Jerudong FC
17 March 2018
Tabuan A (U16)	1–2	MS PDB

== Semi-finals ==
Team 1	Score	Team 2
16 March 2018
Indera SC	1–0 (aet)	Kasuka FC
23 March 2018
MS PDB	1–1 (aet) (6–5 pen)	MS ABDB

== Final ==
Team 1	Score	Team 2
1 April 2018
Indera SC	2–0	MS PDB

== See also ==
- 2017–18 Brunei Super League
