= Royal Brunei Police Force Sports Council =

Bruneian police force sports club

- Majlis Sukan Pasukan Polis Diraja Brunei
- Country: Brunei Darussalam
- Allegiance: Sultan Hassanal Bolkiah
- Type: Royal Brunei Police Force multi-sport club

The Royal Brunei Police Force Sports Council (RBPFSC; Malay: Majlis Sukan Pasukan Polis Diraja Brunei), or simply MS PPDB, is the multi-sport club of the Royal Brunei Police Force (RBPF) in Brunei Darussalam.

Its football team play in the Brunei Super League (BSL).

== Football team ==
Royal Brunei Police Force Sports Council Football Team
- Full name: Majlis Sukan Pasukan Polis Diraja Brunei
- Short name: MS PPDB
- Founded: 1985; 41 years ago
- Ground: Hassanal Bolkiah Polis Gadong Stadium, Gadong, Brunei-Muara, Brunei Darussalam
- Owner: Royal Brunei Police Force
- Coach: Edy Asmady Abdul Malik
- League: Brunei Super League
- 2025–26: 4th

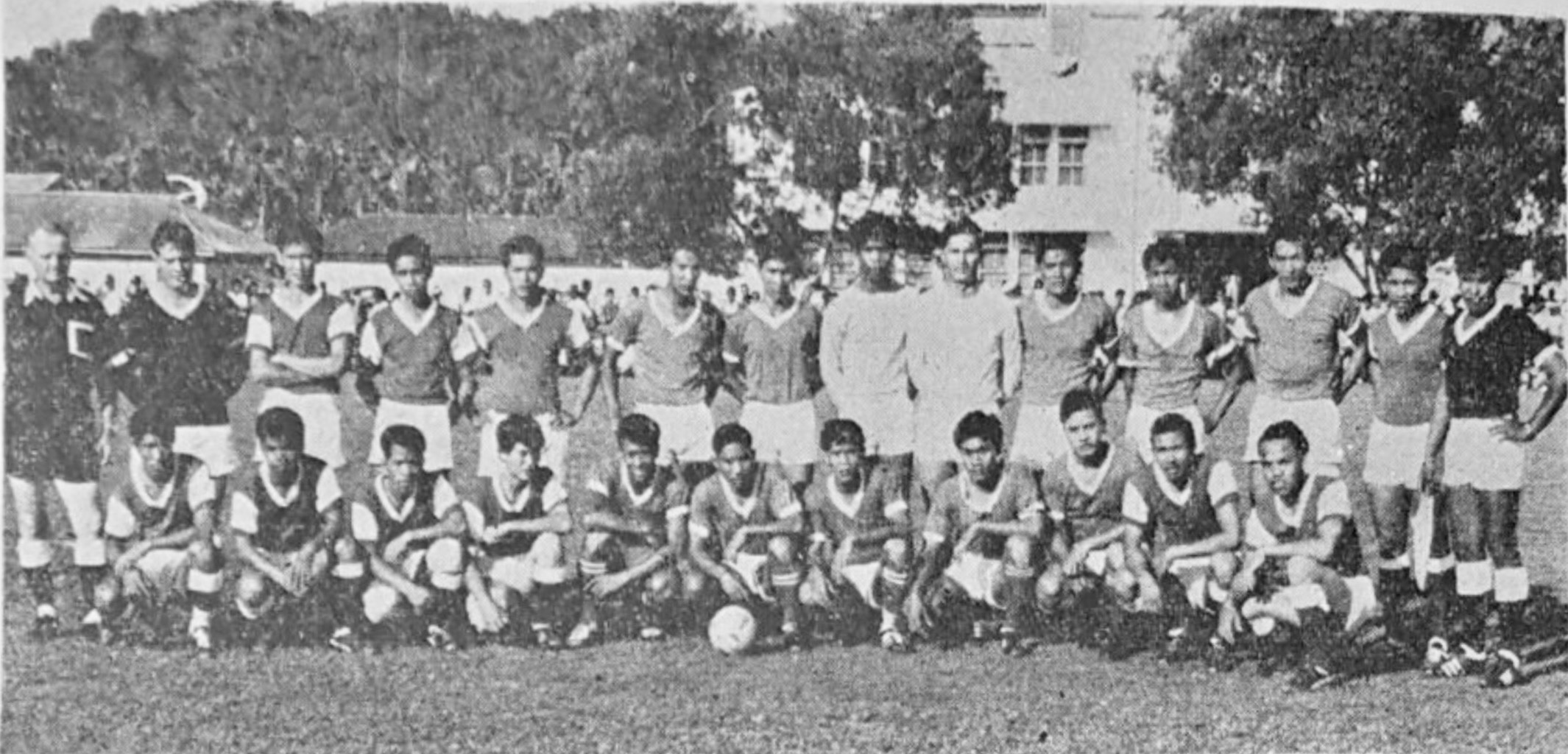
Royal Police Force football team prior to the 'A' Division Football Final, 1967

=== History ===
The Royal Brunei Police Force (RBPF) has been synonymous with the Brunei national and state league teams since the 1970s and 80s, contributing players such as 1981 Borneo Cup match-winner Zamani Ahmad, Roslan Suhaili who scored a hat-trick against Indonesia at a 1980 Summer Olympics qualifying match, as well as Zulkifli Anis who scored against the same opposition in a 1–1 draw at the 1983 SEA Games. Officially formed as an entity in 1985, they regularly competed at national competitions throughout the 1990s.

The Police Force Football Team were a founding member of the 2002 B-League. They withdrew before the 2003 season started, and it was not until 2011 that they reformed, only losing to Rimba Star FC for a qualifying spot in the 2011 Brunei Premier League II that year.

After the reformation of the football pyramid by the newly formed NFABD, MS PDB FT finished third in their group at the 2011–12 Brunei National Football League, enabling them to play in the 2012–13 Brunei Super League. The opening match of the league was the Bruneian version of the Singaporean Uniformed Derby: MS ABDB FT against MS PDB FT on 14 December and it ended 2–1 to the Army-men.

As of 2023, the team has firmly kept its top-flight status for the last eight campaigns. They have also been losing finalists of the Brunei FA Cup in 2017–18 and 2018–19.

=== Current squad ===
As of 14 September 2026

Note: Flags indicate national team as defined under FIFA eligibility rules; some limited exceptions apply. Players may hold more than one non-FIFA nationality.

No.	Pos.	Nation	Player
1	GK	BRU	Salman Sinchun
2	DF	BRU	Haziq Baihaqi Abdullah
3	DF	BRU	Zulkhairi Salleh
4	DF	BRU	Raezarizal Radimas
5	DF	BRU	Amiruddin Jamaluddin
6	DF	BRU	Asri Abdul Hakim
7	MF	BRU	Fazizzul Hussin (captain)
8	MF	BRU	Nizamuddin Ismail
9	FW	BRU	Nur Yamin Mohammad
10	FW	BRU	Nazirrudin Ismail
11	MF	BRU	Nazirul Arsat
12	FW	BRU	Rozandy Anak Bujang
13	MF	BRU	Aidil Ezwandy Anak Akit
14	FW	BRU	Alif Nazwan Muhammad

No.	Pos.	Nation	Player
15	DF	BRU	Abdul Hafiz Ahmad
17	MF	BRU	Na'im Tarif
18	MF	BRU	Abdul Wadud Ramli
19	DF	BRU	Norhanif Radzuan
21	FW	BRU	Abdul Muiz Shahrizan
23	DF	BRU	Khairul Haq Jumat
24	GK	BRU	Yusri Yussof
25	GK	BRU	Abdul Hafiz Awang Ahmad
26	MF	BRU	Syahrul Iman Abdur Rahmani
27	DF	BRU	George Alvin Anak Degat
28	MF	BRU	Sayzwan Mohammad
29	GK	BRU	Akmal Hakim Suhut
30	GK	BRU	Mu'izzuddin Ismail

== See also ==
- Royal Brunei Armed Forces Sports Council
- Sport in Brunei
- Brunei Rugby Football Union
- Ministry of Culture, Youth and Sports (Brunei)
