= Myo Hlaing Win =

Burmese footballer

U Myo Hlaing Win
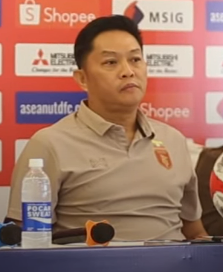
- Myo Hlaing Win in 2024

Personal information
- Full name: Myo Hlaing Win
- Date of birth: 24 May 1973 (age 53)
- Place of birth: Yangon, Myanmar
- Height: 1.68 m (5 ft 6 in)
- Position: Forward

Senior career*
Years	Team	Apps	(Gls)
1988–2007	Finance and Revenue	384	(110)
1990	ATM FA	14	(7)

International career
1989–2005	Myanmar	68	(45)

Managerial career
- 2013–2016: Nay Pyi Taw
- 2019–2023: Ayeyawady United
- 2023–2024: Shan United
- 2024–2026: Myanmar
- * Club domestic league appearances and goals

U Myo Hlaing Win (Burmese: ဦးမျိုးလှိုင်ဝင်း) is a Burmese football coach and former player who played as a forward. He was most recently the head coach of Myanmar national football team.

Hlaing Win was the top goalscorer at the 1998 AFF Championship.

== Club career ==
Player days: Finance Earned Levernew FC He is a one-club player who only played in. At the time, he was the undisputed star of the team, playing an active role in winning nine league championships.

== International career ==
During his international career he was a key contributor to the national team. Known for his pace, movement, and finishing ability, he holds the record as Myanmar's leading goalscorer at international level.

== Managerial career ==
=== Nay Pyi Taw ===
Hlaing Win was given the opportunity to coach Nay Pyi Taw in January 2013. He helped the team finish second in the 2013 Myanmar National League which also sees the team qualified to the 2014 AFC Cup. He guided the team to runners-up in the competition sitting below Hong Kong side Kitchee in the table which sees the team advance to the round of 16. However, the club was beaten 5–0 by Vietnamese club Hà Nội T&T. Myo also guided the club all the way to the 2014 MFF Cup final but fall to a 2–0 defeat to Ayeyawady United. Myo left the club at the end of the 2016 season.

=== Ayeyawady United ===
In February 2019, Hlaing Win was recruited by Ayeyawady United as their head coach. In his first season at the club, he guided the team to finish second in the 2019 season.

=== Shan United ===
On 30 January 2024, Hlaing Win was recruited by Myanmar champions Shan United as the club new head coach. During the 2024–25 ASEAN Club Championship qualifying play-offs, he helped the club to qualified to the tournament after defeating Bruneian club Kasuka 4–2 on aggregate.

=== Myanmar national team ===
After Michael Feichtenbeiner was dismissed by the Myanmar national team, Hlaing Win was appointed as Myanmar new head coach on 9 September 2024 becoming the first countrymen to lead the national team since 2019. He left the squad in July 2026.

== Career statistics ==
=== International ===
Appearances and goals by national team and year
National team	Year	Apps	Goals
Myanmar	1989	1	0
Myanmar	1990	0	0
Myanmar	1991	1	0
Myanmar	1992	1	0
Myanmar	1993	10	11
Myanmar	1994	3	0
Myanmar	1995	10	5
Myanmar	1996	10	7
Myanmar	1997	6	6
Myanmar	1998	5	6
Myanmar	1999	4	3
Myanmar	2000	10	4
Myanmar	2001	0	0
Myanmar	2002	0	0
Myanmar	2003	0	0
Myanmar	2004	5	1
Myanmar	2005	2	0
Total		68	43

=== International goals ===
Scores and results list Myanmar's goal tally first, score column indicates score after each Myanmar goal.

List of international goals scored by Myo Hlaing Win
No.	Date	Venue	Opponent	Score	Result	Competition	Ref.
1	18 April 1993	Thuwunna Stadium, Yangon, Myanmar	Macau	7–1	7–1	Friendly	
2	20 April 1993	Thuwunna Stadium, Yangon, Myanmar	Macau	3–2	3–2	Friendly	
3	9 June 1993	National Stadium, Singapore	Laos	3–0	7–1	1993 Southeast Asian Games	
4	9 June 1993	National Stadium, Singapore	Laos	5–0	7–1	1993 Southeast Asian Games	
5	9 June 1993	National Stadium, Singapore	Laos	7–0	7–1	1993 Southeast Asian Games	
6	13 June 1993	National Stadium, Singapore	Malaysia	1–0	2–1	1993 Southeast Asian Games	
7	15 June 1993	National Stadium, Singapore	Brunei	4–0	6–0	1993 Southeast Asian Games	
8	15 June 1993	National Stadium, Singapore	Brunei	6–0	6–0	1993 Southeast Asian Games	
9	20 June 1993	National Stadium, Singapore	Thailand	1–1	3–4	1993 Southeast Asian Games	
10	20 June 1993	National Stadium, Singapore	Thailand	2–3	3–4	1993 Southeast Asian Games	
11	13 December 1993	Mirpur Stadium, Dhaka, Bangladesh	Bangladesh	1–2	1–3	Friendly	
12	26 October 1995	Thuwunna Stadium, Yangon, Myanmar	Bangladesh	4–0	4–0	4-nation Tiger Trophy	
13	4 November 1995	Thuwunna Stadium, Yangon, Myanmar	Bangladesh	1–1	1–2	4-nation Tiger Trophy	
14	4 December 1995	700th Anniversary Stadium, Chiang Mai, Thailand	Philippines	3–0	4–1	1995 Southeast Asian Games	
15	6 December 1995	700th Anniversary Stadium, Chiang Mai, Thailand	Singapore	1–0	2–4	1995 Southeast Asian Games	
16	6 December 1995	700th Anniversary Stadium, Chiang Mai, Thailand	Singapore	2–4	2–4	1995 Southeast Asian Games	
17	10 December 1995	700th Anniversary Stadium, Chiang Mai, Thailand	Brunei	2–0	2–0	1995 Southeast Asian Games	
18	14 December 1995	700th Anniversary Stadium, Chiang Mai, Thailand	Vietnam	1–0	1–2	1995 Southeast Asian Games	
19	1 July 1996	Rajamangala Stadium, Bangkok, Thailand	Maldives	1–0	3–1	1996 AFC Asian Cup qualification	
20	4 July 1996	National Stadium, Singapore	Singapore	1–2	2–2	1996 AFC Asian Cup qualification	
21	9 July 1996	National Stadium, Singapore	Maldives	1–0	4–1	1996 AFC Asian Cup qualification	
22	9 July 1996	National Stadium, Singapore	Maldives	3–1	4–1	1996 AFC Asian Cup qualification	
23	9 July 1996	National Stadium, Singapore	Maldives	4–1	4–1	1996 AFC Asian Cup qualification	
24	5 September 1996	Jurong Stadium, Jurong, Singapore	Cambodia	4–0	5–0	1996 AFF Championship	
25	11 September 1996	Jurong Stadium, Jurong, Singapore	Laos	4–2	4–2	1996 AFF Championship	
26	31 August 1997	Thuwunna Stadium, Yangon, Myanmar	Bangladesh	2–2	2–2	Friendly	
27	7 October 1997	Lebak Bulus Stadium, Jakarta, Indonesia	Singapore	1–2	2–2	1997 Southeast Asian Games	
28	7 October 1997	Lebak Bulus Stadium, Jakarta, Indonesia	Singapore	2–2	2–2	1997 Southeast Asian Games	
29	9 October 1997	Lebak Bulus Stadium, Jakarta, Indonesia	Brunei	1–0	6–1	1997 Southeast Asian Games	
30	9 October 1997	Lebak Bulus Stadium, Jakarta, Indonesia	Brunei	3–0	6–1	1997 Southeast Asian Games	
31	9 October 1997	Lebak Bulus Stadium, Jakarta, Indonesia	Brunei	5–1	6–1	1997 Southeast Asian Games	
32	13 March 1998	Thuwunna Stadium, Yangon, Myanmar	Brunei	4–1	4–1	1998 AFF Championship qualification	
33	18 March 1998	Thuwunna Stadium, Yangon, Myanmar	Laos	1–0	3–0	1998 AFF Championship qualification	
34	29 August 1998	Thống Nhất Stadium, Ho Chi Minh City, Vietnam	Indonesia	1–0	2–6	1998 AFF Championship	
35	29 August 1998	Thống Nhất Stadium, Ho Chi Minh City, Vietnam	Indonesia	2–6	2–6	1998 AFF Championship	
36	31 August 1998	Thống Nhất Stadium, Ho Chi Minh City, Vietnam	Philippines	2–1	5–2	1998 AFF Championship	
37	31 August 1998	Thống Nhất Stadium, Ho Chi Minh City, Vietnam	Philippines	5–2	5–2	1998 AFF Championship	
38	1 August 1999	Berakas Sports Complex, Bandar Seri Begawan, Brunei	Philippines	1–1	4–1	1999 Southeast Asian Games	
39	1 August 1999	Berakas Sports Complex, Bandar Seri Begawan, Brunei	Philippines	2–1	4–1	1999 Southeast Asian Games	
40	1 August 1999	Berakas Sports Complex, Bandar Seri Begawan, Brunei	Philippines	4–1	4–1	1999 Southeast Asian Games	
41	5 April 2000	Dongdaemun Stadium, Seoul, South Korea	Mongolia	2–0	2–0	2000 AFC Asian Cup qualification	
42	7 April 2000	Dongdaemun Stadium, Seoul, South Korea	Laos	1–0	4–0	2000 AFC Asian Cup qualification	
43	7 April 2000	Dongdaemun Stadium, Seoul, South Korea	Laos	4–0	4–0	2000 AFC Asian Cup qualification	
44	9 August 2000	Perak Stadium, Ipoh, Malaysia	Malaysia	2–1	2–1	Friendly	
45	16 December 2004	Bukit Jalil National Stadium, Kuala Lumpur, Malaysia	Timor-Leste	3–1	3–1	2004 AFF Championship	

== Honours ==
=== Club ===
Finance and Revenue

- Myanmar Premier League (9) : 1996, 1997, 1999, 2000, 2002, 2003, 2004, 2005, 2006

=== International ===
==== Myanmar ====
- AFF Championship

- Fourth place : 2004

- SEA Games

Silver medal : 1993
- Fourth place : 1995

=== Individual ===
- AFF Championship Golden Boot : 1998 (4 goals)
- AFF Championship qualification Top Scorer : 1998 (5 goals)
- Southeast Asian Games Top Scorer : 1993 (8 goals), 1995 (5 goals)
- Southeast Asian Games 2nd Top Scorer : 1997 (5 goals)
- 4-nation Tiger Trophy Top Scorer : 1995 (4 goals)
- AFC Asian Cup qualification 2nd Top Scorer : 1996 (10 goals)

== See also ==
- List of top international men's football goalscorers by country
- List of international goals scored by Myo Hlaing Win
