= Brunei national football team results =

This page details the match results and statistics of the Brunei national football team.

== Key ==
Key to matches

- Att.=Match attendance
- (H)=Home ground
- (A)=Away ground
- (N)=Neutral ground

Key to record by opponent

- Pld=Games played
- W=Games won
- D=Games drawn
- L=Games lost
- GF=Goals for
- GA=Goals against

== Results ==
Brunei's score is shown first in each case.

No.	Date	Venue	Opponents	Score	Competition	Brunei scorers	Att.	Ref.
1	22 May 1972	National Stadium, Bangkok (N)	Malaysia	0–8	1972 AFC Asian Cup qualification		—	
2	24 May 1972	National Stadium, Bangkok (N)	Thailand	0–10	1972 AFC Asian Cup qualification		—	
3	28 May 1972	National Stadium, Bangkok (N)	Indonesia	0–9	1972 AFC Asian Cup qualification		—	
4	15 June 1975	Government Stadium, Hong Kong (N)	Singapore	0–6	1976 AFC Asian Cup qualification		—	
5	17 June 1975	Government Stadium, Hong Kong (N)	China	1–10	1976 AFC Asian Cup qualification	Rosli	—	
6	19 June 1975	Government Stadium, Hong Kong (N)	Hong Kong	0–3	1976 AFC Asian Cup qualification		—	
7	20 November 1977	Stadium Merdeka, Kuala Lumpur (N)	Philippines	1–4	1977 Southeast Asian Games	Unknown	—	
8	22 November 1977	Stadium Merdeka, Kuala Lumpur (N)	Indonesia	0–4	1977 Southeast Asian Games		—	
9	23 November 1977	Stadium Merdeka, Kuala Lumpur (N)	Malaysia	0–7	1977 Southeast Asian Games		—	
10	21 March 1980	Stadium Merdeka, Kuala Lumpur (N)	Philippines	2–0	1980 Summer Olympics qualification	Ismail, Zulkifli	—	
11	24 March 1980	Stadium Merdeka, Kuala Lumpur (N)	Indonesia	3–2	1980 Summer Olympics qualification	Roslan (3)	—	
12	27 March 1980	Stadium Merdeka, Kuala Lumpur (N)	Malaysia	1–3	1980 Summer Olympics qualification	Zulkifli	—	
13	31 March 1980	Stadium Merdeka, Kuala Lumpur (N)	South Korea	0–3	1980 Summer Olympics qualification		—	
14	2 April 1980	Stadium Merdeka, Kuala Lumpur (N)	Japan	1–2	1980 Summer Olympics qualification	Ismail	—	
15	20 November 1980	National Stadium, Bangkok (N)	Singapore	0–3	1980 King's Cup		—	
16	5 October 1982	National Stadium, Singapore (N)	South Korea	1–4	1982 Merlion Cup	Zainuddin	—	
17	7 October 1982	National Stadium, Singapore (N)	Singapore	0–7	1982 Merlion Cup		—	
18	10 October 1982	National Stadium, Singapore (N)	Malaysia	0–4	1982 Merlion Cup		—	
19	29 May 1983	National Stadium, Singapore (N)	Burma	2–1	1983 Southeast Asian Games	Sahari, Majidi	—	
20	31 May 1983	National Stadium, Singapore (N)	Thailand	1–2	1983 Southeast Asian Games	Majidi	—	
21	2 June 1983	National Stadium, Singapore (N)	Indonesia	1–1	1983 Southeast Asian Games	Arifin	—	
22	4 June 1983	National Stadium, Singapore (N)	Singapore	0–4	1983 Southeast Asian Games		—	
23	5 June 1983	National Stadium, Singapore (N)	Malaysia	0–5	1983 Southeast Asian Games		—	
24	7 December 1983	National Stadium, Singapore (N)	Singapore	0–4	1983 Merlion Cup		—	
25	9 December 1983	National Stadium, Singapore (N)	Indonesia	1–0	1983 Merlion Cup	Majidi	—	
26	6 March 1984	Hassanal Bolkiah National Stadium, Bandar Seri Begawan (H)	Japan	1–7	Friendly	Unknown	—	
27	17 February 1985	Canidrome, Macau (A)	Macau	0–2	1986 FIFA World Cup qualification		495	
28	23 February 1985	Government Stadium, Hong Kong (A)	Hong Kong	0–8	1986 FIFA World Cup qualification		12,401	
29	26 February 1985	Estádio Campo Desportivo, Macau (A)	China	0–8	1986 FIFA World Cup qualification		960	
30	1 May 1985	Government Stadium, Hong Kong (H)	China	0–4	1986 FIFA World Cup qualification		2,019	
31	24 March 1985	Hassanal Bolkiah National Stadium, Bandar Seri Begawan (H)	Philippines	4–1	1985 Brunei Merdeka Games	Japar, Sahari, Own goal, Zainuddin	—	
32	6 April 1985	Hassanal Bolkiah National Stadium, Bandar Seri Begawan (H)	Hong Kong	1–5	1986 FIFA World Cup qualification	Zainuddin	—	
33	13 April 1985	Hassanal Bolkiah National Stadium, Bandar Seri Begawan (H)	Macau	1–2	1986 FIFA World Cup qualification	Ahmed	—	
34	13 October 1985	National Stadium, Singapore (N)	Malaysia	0–4	1985 Merlion Cup		—	
35	16 October 1985	National Stadium, Singapore (N)	Singapore	1–2	1985 Merlion Cup	Razali	—	
36	11 December 1985	National Stadium, Bangkok (N)	Indonesia	1–1	1985 Southeast Asian Games	Unknown	—	
37	13 December 1985	National Stadium, Bangkok (N)	Singapore	0–3	1985 Southeast Asian Games		—	
38	10 September 1987	Senayan Stadium, Jakarta (N)	Thailand	1–3	1987 Southeast Asian Games	Jamhari	—	
39	12 September 1987	Senayan Stadium, Jakarta (N)	Indonesia	0–2	1987 Southeast Asian Games		—	
40	21 August 1989	Cheras Stadium, Kuala Lumpur (N)	Indonesia	0–6	1989 Southeast Asian Games		—	
41	23 August 1989	Cheras Stadium, Kuala Lumpur (N)	Malaysia	1–2	1989 Southeast Asian Games	Zainuddin	—	
42	25 August 1989	Cheras Stadium, Kuala Lumpur (N)	Philippines	2–0	1989 Southeast Asian Games	Unknown	—	
43	6 May 1991	Iloilo Sports Complex, Iloilo City (A)	Philippines	1–2	1991 Philippines International Cup	Momin	5,000	
44	12 May 1991	Iloilo Sports Complex, Iloilo City (A)	Philippines	0–0	Friendly		20,000	
45	15 May 1993	Paglaum Sports Complex, Bacolod (A)	Philippines	0–1	1993 Philippines International Cup		—	
46	17 May 1993	Paglaum Sports Complex, Bacolod (A)	Philippines	1–0	1993 Philippines International Cup	Said	—	
47	7 June 1993	National Stadium, Singapore (N)	Laos	2–3	1993 Southeast Asian Games	Said, Zaini	—	
48	9 June 1993	National Stadium, Singapore (N)	Malaysia	1–3	1993 Southeast Asian Games	Said	—	
49	11 June 1993	National Stadium, Singapore (N)	Thailand	2–5	1993 Southeast Asian Games	Momin, Rosanan	—	
50	15 June 1993	National Stadium, Singapore (N)	Myanmar	0–6	1993 Southeast Asian Games		—	
51	4 December 1995	Lamphun (N)	Singapore	2–2	1995 Southeast Asian Games	Suni, Said	—	
52	8 December 1995	Lamphun (N)	Laos	0–3	1995 Southeast Asian Games		—	
53	10 December 1995	Lamphun (N)	Myanmar	0–2	1995 Southeast Asian Games		—	
54	12 December 1995	Lamphun (N)	Philippines	0–1	1995 Southeast Asian Games		—	
55	4 September 1996	National Stadium, Singapore (N)	Singapore	0–3	1996 AFF Championship		8,400	
56	6 September 1996	National Stadium, Singapore (N)	Thailand	0–6	1996 AFF Championship		8,000	
57	8 September 1996	National Stadium, Singapore (N)	Philippines	1–0	1996 AFF Championship	Irwan	3,000	
58	10 September 1996	National Stadium, Singapore (N)	Malaysia	0–6	1996 AFF Championship		20,000	
59	5 October 1997	Lebak Bulus Stadium, Jakarta (N)	Cambodia	0–4	1997 Southeast Asian Games		—	
60	7 October 1997	Lebak Bulus Stadium, Jakarta (N)	Thailand	0–6	1997 Southeast Asian Games		—	
61	9 October 1997	Lebak Bulus Stadium, Jakarta (N)	Myanmar	1–6	1997 Southeast Asian Games	Said	—	
62	12 October 1997	Lebak Bulus Stadium, Jakarta (N)	Singapore	0–1	1997 Southeast Asian Games		—	
63	14 March 1998	Thuwunna Stadium, Yangon (N)	Myanmar	1–4	1998 AFF Championship qualification	Unknown	—	
64	16 March 1998	Thuwunna Stadium, Yangon (N)	Laos	1–2	1998 AFF Championship qualification	Suni	—	
65	2 August 1999	Berakas Sports Complex, Bandar Seri Begawan (N)	Cambodia	3–3	1999 Southeast Asian Games	Said (2), Sallehuddin	5,000	
66	4 August 1999	Berakas Sports Complex, Bandar Seri Begawan (N)	Singapore	1–3	1999 Southeast Asian Games	Rosaidi	—	
67	6 August 1999	Berakas Sports Complex, Bandar Seri Begawan (N)	Malaysia	0–2	1999 Southeast Asian Games		3,000	
68	9 August 1999	Berakas Sports Complex, Bandar Seri Begawan (N)	Indonesia	0–3	1999 Southeast Asian Games		—	
69	13 February 2000	Estádio Campo Desportivo, Macau (N)	Macau	0–1	2000 AFC Asian Cup qualification		—	
70	16 February 2000	Estádio Campo Desportivo, Macau (N)	Japan	0–9	2000 AFC Asian Cup qualification		—	
71	20 February 2000	Estádio Campo Desportivo, Macau (N)	Singapore	0–1	2000 AFC Asian Cup qualification		—	
72	7 April 2001	Hassanal Bolkiah National Stadium, Bandar Seri Begawan (H)	Yemen	0–5	2002 FIFA World Cup qualification		6,000	
73	14 April 2001	Hassanal Bolkiah National Stadium, Bandar Seri Begawan (H)	United Arab Emirates	0–12	2002 FIFA World Cup qualification		1,000	
74	27 April 2001	Althawra Sports City Stadium, Sanaa (A)	Yemen	0–1	2002 FIFA World Cup qualification		30,000	
75	4 May 2001	Khalifa bin Zayed Stadium, Al Ain (A)	United Arab Emirates	0–4	2002 FIFA World Cup qualification		7,000	
76	12 May 2001	Hassanal Bolkiah National Stadium, Bandar Seri Begawan (H)	India	0–1	2002 FIFA World Cup qualification		4,000	
77	20 May 2001	Bangalore Football Stadium, Bangalore (A)	India	0–5	2002 FIFA World Cup qualification		7,000	
78	21 March 2003	National Football Stadium, Malé (N)	Maldives	1–1	2004 AFC Asian Cup qualification	Fadlin	—	
79	23 March 2003	National Football Stadium, Malé (N)	Myanmar	0–5	2004 AFC Asian Cup qualification		—	
80	2 April 2006	M. A. Aziz Stadium, Chittagong (N)	Sri Lanka	0–1	2006 AFC Challenge Cup		2,000	
81	4 April 2006	M. A. Aziz Stadium, Chittagong (N)	Nepal	2–1	2006 AFC Challenge Cup	Adie, Riwandi	2,500	
82	6 April 2006	M. A. Aziz Stadium, Chittagong (N)	Bhutan	0–0	2006 AFC Challenge Cup		2,000	
83	12 November 2006	Panaad Stadium, Bacolod (N)	Timor-Leste	3–2	2007 AFF Championship qualification	Adie, Mardi (2)	—	
84	16 November 2006	Panaad Stadium, Bacolod (N)	Cambodia	1–1	2007 AFF Championship qualification	Hardi	—	
85	18 November 2006	Panaad Stadium, Bacolod (N)	Laos	1–4	2007 AFF Championship qualification	Riwandi	—	
86	20 November 2006	Panaad Stadium, Bacolod (N)	Philippines	1–4	2007 AFF Championship qualification	Ramlee	—	
87	13 May 2008	Barotac Nuevo Plaza Field, Barotac Nuevo (N)	Philippines	0–1	2008 AFC Challenge Cup qualification		3,500	
88	15 May 2008	Barotac Nuevo Plaza Field, Barotac Nuevo (N)	Bhutan	1–1	2008 AFC Challenge Cup qualification	Khayrun	4,000	
89	17 May 2008	Barotac Nuevo Plaza Field, Barotac Nuevo (N)	Tajikistan	0–4	2008 AFC Challenge Cup qualification		450	
90	19 October 2008	Phnom Penh Olympic Stadium, Phnom Penh (N)	Philippines	1–1	2008 AFF Championship qualification	Shah Razen	—	
91	21 October 2008	Phnom Penh Olympic Stadium, Phnom Penh (N)	Timor-Leste	4–1	2008 AFF Championship qualification	Shah Razen (2), Azwan S., Sallehuddin	—	
92	23 October 2008	Phnom Penh Olympic Stadium, Phnom Penh (N)	Laos	2–3	2008 AFF Championship qualification	Hardi, Abu Bakar	—	
93	25 October 2008	Phnom Penh Olympic Stadium, Phnom Penh (N)	Cambodia	1–2	2008 AFF Championship qualification	Hardi	—	
94	4 April 2009	Sugathadasa Stadium, Colombo (N)	Sri Lanka	1–5	2010 AFC Challenge Cup qualification	Kamarul	700	
95	6 April 2009	Sugathadasa Stadium, Colombo (N)	Pakistan	0–6	2010 AFC Challenge Cup qualification		200	
96	8 April 2009	Sugathadasa Stadium, Colombo (N)	Chinese Taipei	0–5	2010 AFC Challenge Cup qualification		1,000	
97	26 September 2012	Hassanal Bolkiah National Stadium, Bandar Seri Begawan (H)	Indonesia	0–5	Friendly		—	
98	5 October 2012	Thuwunna Stadium, Yangon (N)	Myanmar	0–1	2012 AFF Championship qualification		7,000	
99	9 October 2012	Thuwunna Stadium, Yangon (N)	Cambodia	3–2	2012 AFF Championship qualification	Aminuddin, Helmi, Azwan S.	—	
100	11 October 2012	Thuwunna Stadium, Yangon (N)	Laos	1–3	2012 AFF Championship qualification	Rosmin	—	
101	13 October 2012	Thuwunna Stadium, Yangon (N)	Timor-Leste	2–1	2012 AFF Championship qualification	Adi, Azwan A.	—	
102	12 October 2014	New Laos National Stadium, Vientiane (N)	Timor-Leste	2–4	2014 AFF Championship qualification	Adi, Fakharrazi	—	
103	14 October 2014	New Laos National Stadium, Vientiane (N)	Laos	2–4	2014 AFF Championship qualification	Fakharrazi, Shah Razen	—	
104	16 October 2014	New Laos National Stadium, Vientiane (N)	Myanmar	1–3	2014 AFF Championship qualification	Adi	—	
105	20 October 2014	New Laos National Stadium, Vientiane (N)	Cambodia	0–1	2014 AFF Championship qualification		—	
106	12 March 2015	National Stadium, Kaohsiung (A)	Chinese Taipei	1–0	2018 FIFA World Cup qualification	Adi	6,273	
107	17 March 2015	Hassanal Bolkiah National Stadium, Bandar Seri Begawan (H)	Chinese Taipei	0–2	2018 FIFA World Cup qualification		18,000	
108	6 June 2015	Jurong West Stadium, Singapore (A)	Singapore	1–5	Friendly	Abdul Mu'iz	—	
109	3 November 2015	Phnom Penh Olympic Stadium, Phnom Penh (A)	Cambodia	1–6	Friendly	Abdul Azizi	—	
110	15 October 2016	Phnom Penh Olympic Stadium, Phnom Penh (N)	Timor-Leste	2–1	2016 AFF Championship qualification	Adi, Shafie	45,000	
111	18 October 2016	Phnom Penh Olympic Stadium, Phnom Penh (N)	Cambodia	0–3	2016 AFF Championship qualification		45,000	
112	21 October 2016	RSN Stadium, Phnom Penh (N)	Laos	3–4	2016 AFF Championship qualification	Adi, Faiq, Razimie	200	
113	2 November 2016	Sarawak State Stadium, Kuching (N)	Timor-Leste	4–0	2016 AFC Solidarity Cup	Azwan A. (2), Shah Razen, Adi	100	
114	8 November 2016	Sarawak State Stadium, Kuching (N)	Nepal	0–3	2016 AFC Solidarity Cup		210	
115	12 November 2016	Sarawak State Stadium, Kuching (N)	Macau	1–1 (a.e.t.) (3–4p)	2016 AFC Solidarity Cup	Shah Razen	331	
116	14 November 2016	Sarawak State Stadium, Kuching (N)	Laos	2–3	2016 AFC Solidarity Cup	Shah Razen (2)	257	
117	1 September 2018	Kuala Lumpur Stadium, Kuala Lumpur (A)	Timor-Leste	1–3	2018 AFF Championship qualification	Azwan A.	261	
118	8 September 2018	Hassanal Bolkiah National Stadium, Bandar Seri Begawan (H)	Timor-Leste	1–0	2018 AFF Championship qualification	Najib	2,345	
119	6 June 2019	MFF Football Centre, Ulaanbaatar (A)	Mongolia	0–2	2022 FIFA World Cup qualification		1,685	
120	11 June 2019	Hassanal Bolkiah National Stadium, Bandar Seri Begawan (H)	Mongolia	2–1	2022 FIFA World Cup qualification	Razimie (2)	17,210	
121	27 March 2022	New Laos National Stadium, Vientiane (A)	Laos	2–3	Friendly	Azwan, Hakeme	5,215	
122	27 May 2022	Bukit Jalil National Stadium, Kuala Lumpur (A)	Malaysia	0–4	Friendly		—	
123	21 September 2022	Track & Field Sports Complex, Bandar Seri Begawan (H)	Maldives	0–3	Friendly		453	
124	27 September 2022	Track & Field Sports Complex, Bandar Seri Begawan (H)	Laos	1–0	Friendly	Nazirrudin	450	
125	5 November 2022	Track & Field Sports Complex, Bandar Seri Begawan (H)	Timor-Leste	6–2	2022 AFF Championship qualification	Abdul, Razimie, Azwan, Wafi	600	
126	8 November 2022	Track & Field Sports Complex, Bandar Seri Begawan (A)	Timor-Leste	0–1	2022 AFF Championship qualification		1,207	
127	20 December 2022	Kuala Lumpur Stadium, Kuala Lumpur (H)	Thailand	0–5	2022 AFF Championship		480	
128	23 December 2022	Rizal Memorial Stadium, Manila (A)	Philippines	1–5	2022 AFF Championship	Razimie	1,650	
129	26 December 2022	Kuala Lumpur Stadium, Kuala Lumpur (H)	Indonesia	0–7	2022 AFF Championship		5,439	
130	29 December 2022	Morodok Techo National Stadium, Phnom Penh (A)	Cambodia	1–5	2022 AFF Championship	Ikhwan	6,169	
131	11 September 2023	Hong Kong Stadium, Hong Kong (A)	Hong Kong	0–10	Friendly		6,097	
132	12 October 2023	Gelora Bung Karno Stadium, Jakarta (A)	Indonesia	0–6	2026 FIFA World Cup qualification		23,318	
133	17 October 2023	Hassanal Bolkiah National Stadium, Bandar Seri Begawan (H)	Indonesia	0–6	2026 FIFA World Cup qualification		17,281	
134	22 March 2024	King Abdullah Sports City Reserve Stadium, Jeddah (A)	Bermuda	0–2	2024 FIFA Series			
135	26 March 2024	King Abdullah Sports City Reserve Stadium, Jeddah (A)	Vanuatu	3–2	2024 FIFA Series	Syafiq Safiuddin, Ikhwan, Hakeme		
136	8 June 2024	Hassanal Bolkiah National Stadium, Bandar Seri Begawan (H)	Sri Lanka	1–0	Friendly	Azwan A.	500	
137	11 June 2024	Hassanal Bolkiah National Stadium, Bandar Seri Begawan (A)	Sri Lanka	1–0	Friendly	Azwan A.	800	
138	6 September 2024	Hassanal Bolkiah National Stadium, Bandar Seri Begawan (H)	Macau	3–0	2027 AFC Asian Cup qualification – play-off round	Hakeme, Nazry, Hariz H.	3,794	
139	10 September 2024	Estádio Campo Desportivo, Macau (A)	Macau	1–0	2027 AFC Asian Cup qualification – play-off round	Azwan A.	1,368	
140	8 October 2024	Hassanal Bolkiah National Stadium, Bandar Seri Begawan (H)	Timor-Leste	0–1	2024 ASEAN Championship qualification		3,115	
141	15 October 2024	Chonburi Stadium, Chonburi (A)	Timor-Leste	0–0	2024 ASEAN Championship qualification			
142	15 November 2024	Krasnodar Stadium, Krasnodar (A)	Russia	0–11	Friendly		26,865	
143	25 March 2025	Saoud bin Abdulrahman Stadium, Doha (A)	Lebanon	0–5	2027 AFC Asian Cup qualification		282	
144	5 June 2025	Alpine Training Camp, Bangkok (N)	Sri Lanka	0–1	Friendly			
145	10 June 2025	Hassanal Bolkiah National Stadium, Bandar Seri Begawan (H)	Bhutan	2–1	2027 AFC Asian Cup qualification	Nazirrudin	3,158	
146	9 October 2025	Hassanal Bolkiah National Stadium, Bandar Seri Begawan (H)	Yemen	0–2	2027 AFC Asian Cup qualification		1,539	
147	14 October 2025	Jaber Al-Ahmad International Stadium, Kuwait City (A)	Yemen	0–9	2027 AFC Asian Cup qualification		755	
148	18 November 2025	Hassanal Bolkiah National Stadium, Bandar Seri Begawan (H)	Lebanon	0–3	2027 AFC Asian Cup qualification			
149	31 March 2026	Indira Gandhi Athletic Stadium, Guwahati (A)	Bhutan	1–2	2027 AFC Asian Cup qualification	Hakeme	549	
150	2 June 2026	Hassanal Bolkiah National Stadium, Bandar Seri Begawan (H)	Timor-Leste	0–3	2026 ASEAN Championship qualification		2,186	
151	9 June 2026	Kuala Lumpur Stadium, Kuala Lumpur (A)	Timor-Leste	1–3	2026 ASEAN Championship qualification	Azwan A.	250	
152	24 September 2026	Mong Kok Stadium, Hong Kong (N)	Laos	1–3	2026 FIFA ASEAN Challenge Cup	Haziq N.		
153	30 September 2026	Kai Tak Stadium, Hong Kong (N)	Hong Kong	0–2	2026 FIFA ASEAN Challenge Cup		20,116	
154	14 November 2026	Sisaket Provincial Stadium, Thailand (N)	Thailand	0–6	2026 King's Cup		14,319	
154	17 November 2026	Sisaket Provincial Stadium, Thailand (N)	Oman	0–7	2026 King's Cup		2,659	

Notes

1. A: China played their home match against Brunei during qualifying for the 1986 FIFA World Cup in Macau.
2. B: Brunei played their home match against China during qualifying for the 1986 FIFA World Cup in Hong Kong.
3. C: Timor-Leste played their home match during qualifying for the 2018 AFF Championship in Kuala Lumpur, Malaysia.
4. D: Brunei played their home matches during the 2022 AFF Championship in Kuala Lumpur, Malaysia.
5. E: Brunei were the designated away side.
6. F: Timor-Leste played their home match during qualifying for the 2024 ASEAN Championship in Chonburi, Thailand.
7. G: Lebanon played their home match during qualifying for the 2027 AFC Asian Cup in Doha, Qatar.
8. H: Yemen played their home match during qualifying for the 2027 AFC Asian Cup in Kuwait City, Kuwait.
9. I: Bhutan played their home match during qualifying for the 2027 AFC Asian Cup in Guwahati, India.
10. J: Timor-Leste played their home match during qualifying for the 2026 ASEAN Championship in Kuala Lumpur, Malaysia.

== Record by opponent ==
Team	Pld	W	D	L	GF	GA	GD	WPCT
Bermuda	1	0	0	1	0	2	−2	0.00
Bhutan	5	1	2	2	5	6	−1	20.00
Cambodia	9	1	2	6	10	27	−17	11.11
China	3	0	0	3	1	22	−21	0.00
Chinese Taipei	3	1	0	2	1	7	−6	33.33
Timor-Leste	13	7	1	5	25	19	+6	53.85
Hong Kong	6	0	0	6	1	30	−29	0.00
India	2	0	0	2	0	6	−6	0.00
Indonesia	13	2	2	9	6	52	−46	15.38
Japan	3	0	0	3	2	18	−16	0.00
Laos	13	1	0	12	19	38	−19	7.69
Lebanon	3	0	0	3	0	11	−11	0.00
Macau	6	2	1	3	6	6	0	33.33
Malaysia	11	0	0	11	3	48	−45	0.00
Maldives	2	0	1	1	1	4	−3	0.00
Mongolia	2	1	0	1	2	3	−1	50.00
Myanmar (Note: Includes results as Burma.)	8	1	0	7	5	28	−23	12.50
Nepal	2	1	0	1	2	4	−2	50.00
Pakistan	1	0	0	1	0	6	−6	0.00
Philippines	14	5	2	7	15	20	−5	35.71
Russia	1	0	0	1	0	11	−11	0.00
Singapore	13	0	1	12	5	44	−39	0.00
South Korea	2	0	0	2	1	7	−6	0.00
Sri Lanka	6	3	0	3	4	7	−3	50.00
Tajikistan	1	0	0	1	0	4	−4	0.00
Thailand	8	0	0	8	4	43	−39	0.00
Oman	1	0	0	1	0	7	−7	0.00
United Arab Emirates	2	0	0	2	0	16	−16	0.00
Vanuatu	1	1	0	0	3	2	+1	100.00
Yemen	4	0	0	4	0	17	−17	0.00
Total	159	27	12	120	121	515	−394	16.98

Source: Results
