= Suni Mat Jerah =

Bruneian footballer

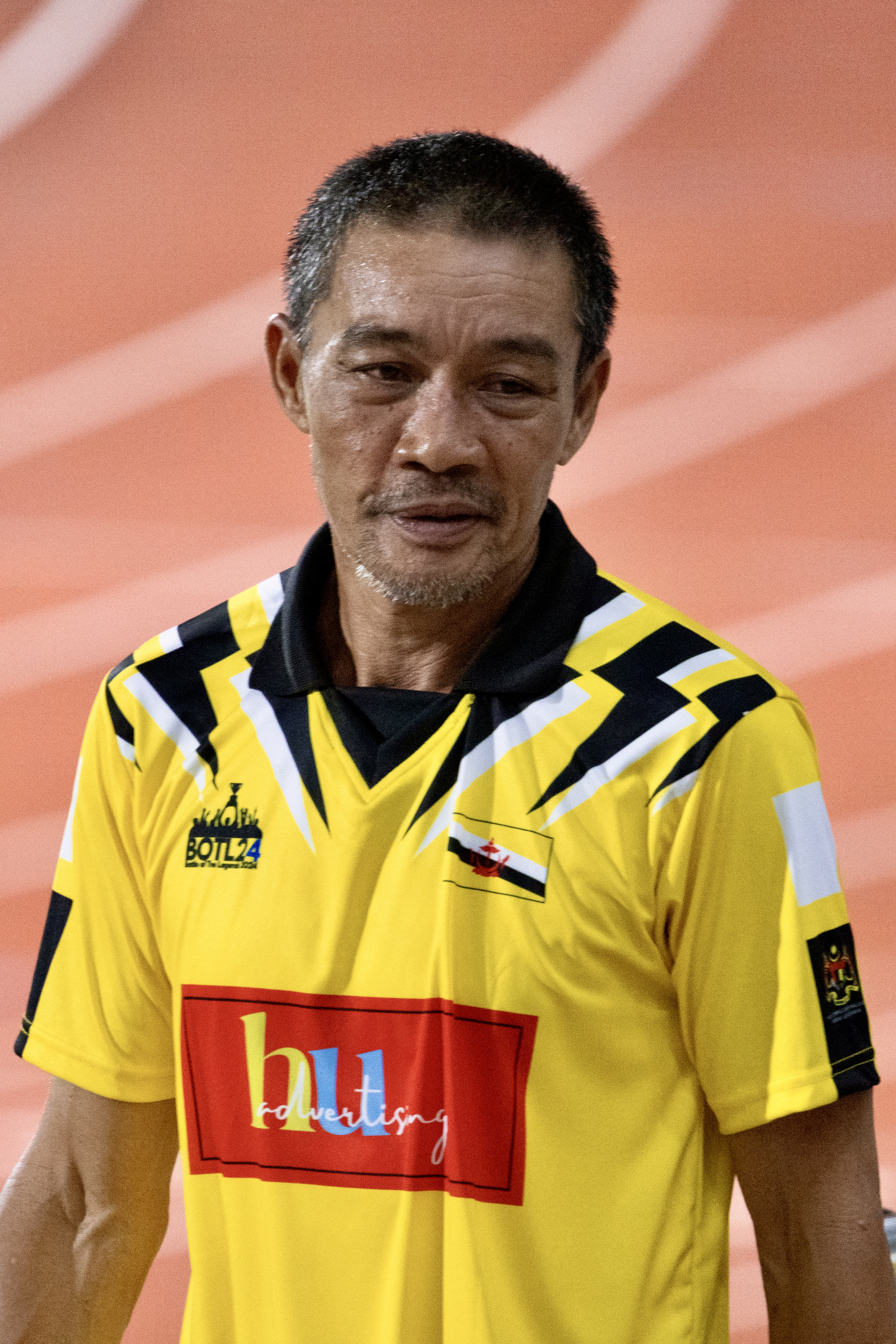
- Suni in 2024

Personal information
- Full name: Suni bin Mat Jerah
- Date of birth: 4 May 1968 (age 58)
- Place of birth: Brunei
- Position: Striker

Senior career*
Years	Team	Apps	(Gls)
1995–2000	Brunei		
2001–2008	Wijaya FC		
2012	Perda FC		

International career^{‡}
1995–2001	Brunei	13+	(2+)
- * Club domestic league appearances and goals as of 11 March 2016 ‡ National team caps and goals as of 13 June 2023

Suni bin Mat Jerah (born 4 May 1968) is a Bruneian former footballer who played as a striker. He played for the Brunei national team and most notably the Bruneian representative team that competed in the Malaysian leagues in the late nineties, and was part of the 1999 Malaysia Cup-winning squad.

== Club career ==
Suni first played with Brunei in the Liga Semi-Pro Malaysia in 1995, forming a lethal strike partnership with experienced striker Rosanan Samak. His M-League career came to a climax in 1999 when Brunei beat Sarawak FA 2–1 in the final of the Malaysia Cup, although he did not take the field. After Brunei were relegated from Premier 1 the next season, he chose to leave the team for Wijaya FC in the domestic league.

Now revered as a legend, Suni brought success to Wijaya with the Brunei FA Cup in 2002 and the B-League championship in 2003. In his last season as a Wijaya player, he scored a last-minute winner against Majra FC to put his team into the final of the 2008 Brunei FA Cup. He would be let down in his last game by a solitary MS ABDB goal in the final.

Suni came out of retirement to captain Perda FC for the 2012 Brunei National Football League (precursor to the Brunei Super League), but his side finished seventh in the 8-team group stage.

== International career ==
Suni debuted at the 1995 SEA Games held in Thailand, scoring a goal against Singapore on 4 December. Brunei would lose all of their matches after this valiant 2–2 draw.

The following year, Suni started four games in as many matches at the inaugural 1996 AFF Championship held in September, claiming victory against the Philippines in a 1–0 win. He also scored a goal against Laos in the 1998 AFF Championship qualification group game where Brunei failed to qualify with two losses.

Suni played for Brunei at the 2000 AFC Asian Cup qualifying round, a disastrous campaign which included a heavy 9–0 defeat by Japan. His last outings for the national team were at the 2002 World Cup qualifying first round for AFC, playing the full ninety minutes in Brunei's record heaviest defeat, a 0–12 drubbing by the United Arab Emirates.

== Honours ==
Brunei M-League Team

- Malaysia Cup: 1999

Wijaya FC

- Brunei FA Cup: 2002
- B-League: 2003
