= Ali Mustafa (footballer) =

Bruneian footballer and coach

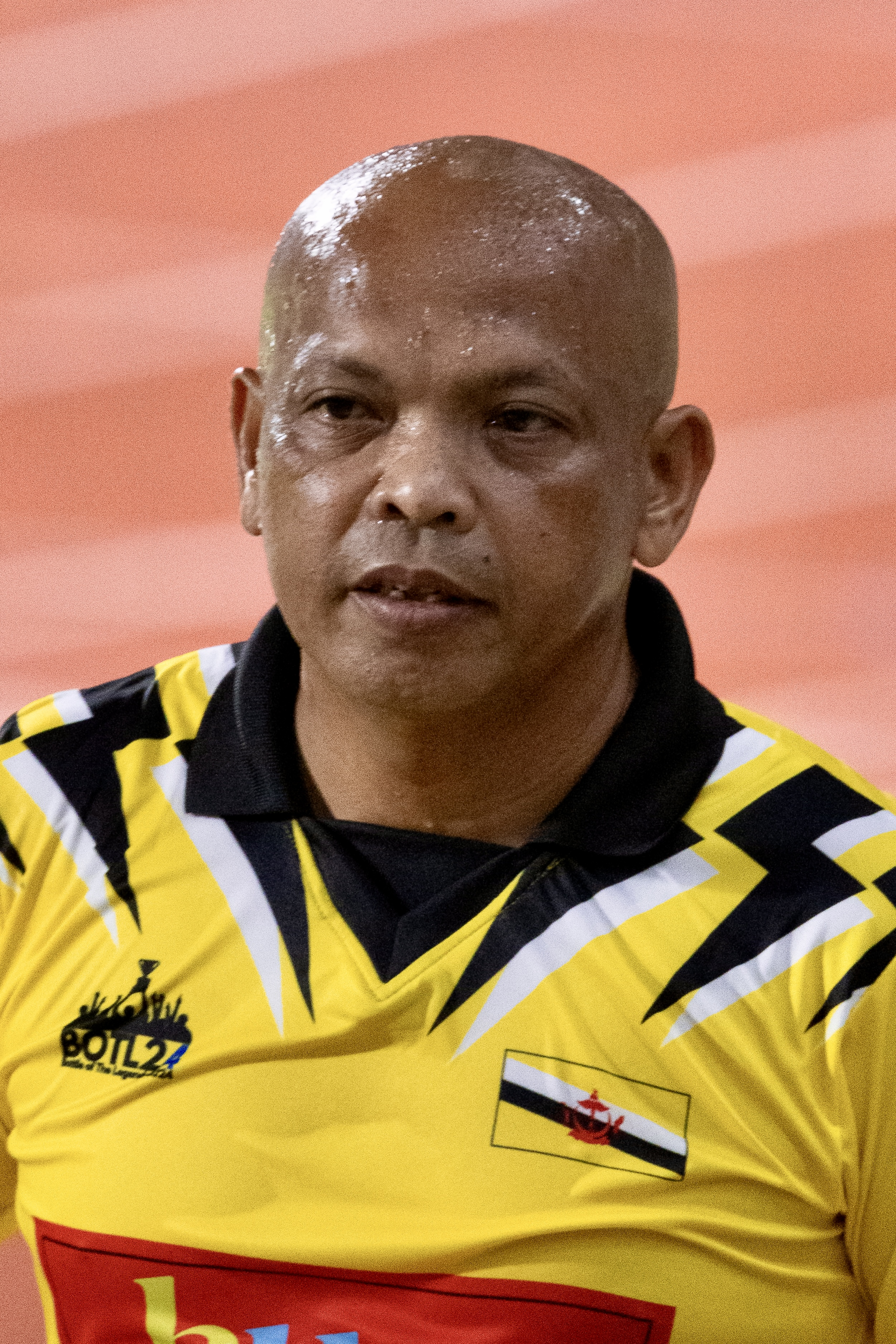
- Ali Mustafa in 2024

Personal information
- Full name: Muhammad Ali bin Haji Mustafa
- Date of birth: 24 May 1976 (age 50)
- Place of birth: Bandar Seri Begawan, Brunei

Team information
- Current team: Brunei U17 (Head coach)

Senior career*
Years	Team	Apps	(Gls)
1994–1999	Brunei		

International career
- Brunei

Managerial career
- 2003: Wijaya
- 2004–2014: QAF
- 2006: Brunei
- 2009: Brunei
- 2015: Brunei U15
- 2016: Brunei U17
- 2016–2017: Brunei (assistant)
- 2018–2023: Kasuka
- 2020: Brunei (caretaker)
- 2024–: Brunei U17
- 2025–2026: Brunei (assistant)
- 2026: Brunei
- * Club domestic league appearances and goals

Ali Mustafa is a Bruneian former national football player who is currently head coach of the Brunei U17.

== Playing career ==
Ali was a midfielder for the Bruneian representative team than played in the Malaysian leagues in the mid-90s. He served as backup to the likes of Said Abdullah, Rosli Liman and Rosaidi Kamis.

== Coaching career ==
After earning his coaching badges, Ali became head coach of Wijaya in 2003, then QAF in 2004. His tenure lasted more than a decade until his team left the Brunei Super League in 2015, but not before lifting three straight titles from 2005-06 to 2009-10. He subsequently found work with Brunei's governing body of football, NFABD, as the coach of the national under-15s in 2015.

For the 2016 season, Ali coached the Tabuan U17 team in the Brunei Premier League. They replaced the Tabuan U18s led by Kwon Oh-son which became Tabuan U21 in the Brunei Super League. He became assistant coach to Mike Wong in the full national team after the completion of the Premier League season.

In 2020, he was re-appointed as head coach of the Brunei national team, while still coaching Kasuka FC at club level. He finished his club-level assignment after winning the 2023 Brunei Super League.

In June 2026, Ali was appointed as head coach of the Brunei national team, after previously assisting Fábio Maciel on his interim spell with the Wasps.

== International career ==
As was practice for Brunei's football association to send a club side for international tournaments at the time, due to QAF winning the domestic title in 2006 and 2010 Ali was appointed head coach of the Brunei national football team for the two AFC Challenge Cup campaigns of 2006 and 2009. (Brunei sent DPMM for games held in 2008 but the club declined in 2009 due to the hectic S.League schedule.) He only managed one win in 6 matches for the Wasps.

== Personal life ==
His son Khairul Alimin is a football player who plays for Wijaya FC.
