= List of international goals scored by Myo Hlaing Win =

Myo Hlaing Win is a former Burmese professional footballer who represented the Myanmar national football team in 68 international matches, scoring 45 goals which are listed below. He played as a forward.

== Goals ==
Scores and results list Myanmar's goal tally first, score column indicates the score after each Myanmar goal.

List of international goals scored by Myo Hlaing Win
No.	Date	Venue	Opponent	Score	Result	Competition	Ref.
1	18 April 1993	Thuwunna Stadium, Yangon, Myanmar	Macau	7–1	7–1	Friendly	
2	20 April 1993	Thuwunna Stadium, Yangon, Myanmar	Macau	3–2	3–2	Friendly	
3	9 June 1993	National Stadium, Singapore	Laos	3–0	7–1	1993 Southeast Asian Games	
4	9 June 1993	National Stadium, Singapore	Laos	5–0	7–1	1993 Southeast Asian Games	
5	9 June 1993	National Stadium, Singapore	Laos	7–0	7–1	1993 Southeast Asian Games	
6	13 June 1993	National Stadium, Singapore	Malaysia	1–0	2–1	1993 Southeast Asian Games	
7	15 June 1993	National Stadium, Singapore	Brunei	4–0	6–0	1993 Southeast Asian Games	
8	15 June 1993	National Stadium, Singapore	Brunei	6–0	6–0	1993 Southeast Asian Games	
9	20 June 1993	National Stadium, Singapore	Thailand	1–1	3–4	1993 Southeast Asian Games	
10	20 June 1993	National Stadium, Singapore	Thailand	2–3	3–4	1993 Southeast Asian Games	
11	13 December 1993	Mirpur Stadium, Dhaka, Bangladesh	Bangladesh	1–2	1–3	Friendly	
12	26 October 1995	Thuwunna Stadium, Yangon, Myanmar	Bangladesh	4–0	4–0	4-nation Tiger Trophy	
13	4 November 1995	Thuwunna Stadium, Yangon, Myanmar	Bangladesh	1–1	1–2	4-nation Tiger Trophy	
14	4 December 1995	700th Anniversary Stadium, Chiang Mai, Thailand	Philippines	3–0	4–1	1995 Southeast Asian Games	
15	6 December 1995	700th Anniversary Stadium, Chiang Mai, Thailand	Singapore	1–0	2–4	1995 Southeast Asian Games	
16	6 December 1995	700th Anniversary Stadium, Chiang Mai, Thailand	Singapore	2–4	2–4	1995 Southeast Asian Games	
17	10 December 1995	700th Anniversary Stadium, Chiang Mai, Thailand	Brunei	2–0	2–0	1995 Southeast Asian Games	
18	14 December 1995	700th Anniversary Stadium, Chiang Mai, Thailand	Vietnam	1–0	1–2	1995 Southeast Asian Games	
19	1 July 1996	Rajamangala Stadium, Bangkok, Thailand	Maldives	1–0	3–1	1996 AFC Asian Cup qualification	
20	4 July 1996	National Stadium, Singapore	Singapore	1–2	2–2	1996 AFC Asian Cup qualification	
21	9 July 1996	National Stadium, Singapore	Maldives	1–0	4–1	1996 AFC Asian Cup qualification	
22	9 July 1996	National Stadium, Singapore	Maldives	3–1	4–1	1996 AFC Asian Cup qualification	
23	9 July 1996	National Stadium, Singapore	Maldives	4–1	4–1	1996 AFC Asian Cup qualification	
24	5 September 1996	Jurong Stadium, Jurong, Singapore	Cambodia	4–0	5–0	1996 AFF Championship	
25	11 September 1996	Jurong Stadium, Jurong, Singapore	Laos	4–2	4–2	1996 AFF Championship	
26	31 August 1997	Thuwunna Stadium, Yangon, Myanmar	Bangladesh	2–2	2–2	Friendly	
27	7 October 1997	Lebak Bulus Stadium, Jakarta, Indonesia	Singapore	1–2	2–2	1997 Southeast Asian Games	
28	7 October 1997	Lebak Bulus Stadium, Jakarta, Indonesia	Singapore	2–2	2–2	1997 Southeast Asian Games	
29	9 October 1997	Lebak Bulus Stadium, Jakarta, Indonesia	Brunei	1–0	6–1	1997 Southeast Asian Games	
30	9 October 1997	Lebak Bulus Stadium, Jakarta, Indonesia	Brunei	3–0	6–1	1997 Southeast Asian Games	
31	9 October 1997	Lebak Bulus Stadium, Jakarta, Indonesia	Brunei	5–1	6–1	1997 Southeast Asian Games	
32	13 March 1998	Thuwunna Stadium, Yangon, Myanmar	Brunei	4–1	4–1	1998 AFF Championship qualification	
33	18 March 1998	Thuwunna Stadium, Yangon, Myanmar	Laos	1–0	3–0	1998 AFF Championship qualification	
34	29 August 1998	Thống Nhất Stadium, Ho Chi Minh City, Vietnam	Indonesia	1–0	2–6	1998 AFF Championship	
35	29 August 1998	Thống Nhất Stadium, Ho Chi Minh City, Vietnam	Indonesia	2–6	2–6	1998 AFF Championship	
36	31 August 1998	Thống Nhất Stadium, Ho Chi Minh City, Vietnam	Philippines	2–1	5–2	1998 AFF Championship	
37	31 August 1998	Thống Nhất Stadium, Ho Chi Minh City, Vietnam	Philippines	5–2	5–2	1998 AFF Championship	
38	1 August 1999	Berakas Sports Complex, Bandar Seri Begawan, Brunei	Philippines	1–1	4–1	1999 Southeast Asian Games	
39	1 August 1999	Berakas Sports Complex, Bandar Seri Begawan, Brunei	Philippines	2–1	4–1	1999 Southeast Asian Games	
40	1 August 1999	Berakas Sports Complex, Bandar Seri Begawan, Brunei	Philippines	4–1	4–1	1999 Southeast Asian Games	
41	5 April 2000	Dongdaemun Stadium, Seoul, South Korea	Mongolia	2–0	2–0	2000 AFC Asian Cup qualification	
42	7 April 2000	Dongdaemun Stadium, Seoul, South Korea	Laos	1–0	4–0	2000 AFC Asian Cup qualification	
43	7 April 2000	Dongdaemun Stadium, Seoul, South Korea	Laos	4–0	4–0	2000 AFC Asian Cup qualification	
44	9 August 2000	Perak Stadium, Ipoh, Malaysia	Malaysia	2–1	2–1	Friendly	
45	16 December 2004	Bukit Jalil National Stadium, Kuala Lumpur, Malaysia	Timor-Leste	3–1	3–1	2004 AFF Championship	
