= Finance and Revenue F.C. =

Myanmar Lion မြန်မာခြင်္သေ့
- Full name: Myanmar Lion Football Club
- Founded: 1924; 102 years ago (as Rangoon Customs)
- Ground: Aung San Stadium
- Capacity: 40,000
- Owner: Ministry of Finance and Revenue of Myanmar
- Manager: Zaw Zaw Myo
- League: MNL-2
Home colours	Away colours

Finance and Revenue Football Club (often shortened as F&R FC), also known as Mountain Lion FC, and formerly as Rangoon Customs, is a Burmese professional football club operated by the Ministry of Finance and Revenue of Myanmar. They won a total of 17 Burma First Division championships prior to 1996, and 9 Myanmar Premier League championships between 1996 and 2008. The club completed its dominance by winning the Myanmar Premier League Cup 2009.

F&R's long presence in top division has come to an end in April 2009 as the country's first ever professional league, the Myanmar National League, does not include any clubs run by government ministries. In April 2009, the club released 17 of its players to the MNL, for a transfer fee of 9.7 million kyats.

== Honours ==
=== Domestic ===
- Rangoon League Championship
  - : 1980–81, 1981–82, 1983–84
- Myanmar Premier League
  - (9): 1996, 1997, 1999, 2000, 2002, 2003, 2004, 2005, 2006

=== International ===
- (India) IFA Shield
  - Champions (1): 2004
  - Runners-up (1): 1929 (as Rangoon Customs)
