= 2008 Myanmar Premier League =

Myanmar Premier League
- Season: 2008

Statistics of the Myanmar Premier League in the 2008 season.

== Overview ==
Kanbawza won the championship.

== Teams ==
- Finance and Revenue
- Ministry of Commerce
- Transport
- Ministry of Energy
- YC Development Committee
- Kanbawza
- Construction
- Home Affairs
- Forestry
- Defence
- Myanmar Railway
- A&I
- Royal Eleven
- Army

== See also ==
- 2000 Myanmar Premier League
- 2003 Myanmar Premier League
- 2004 Myanmar Premier League
- 2005 Myanmar Premier League
- 2006 Myanmar Premier League
- 2007 Myanmar Premier League
