= Zainuddin Kassim =

Bruneian footballer

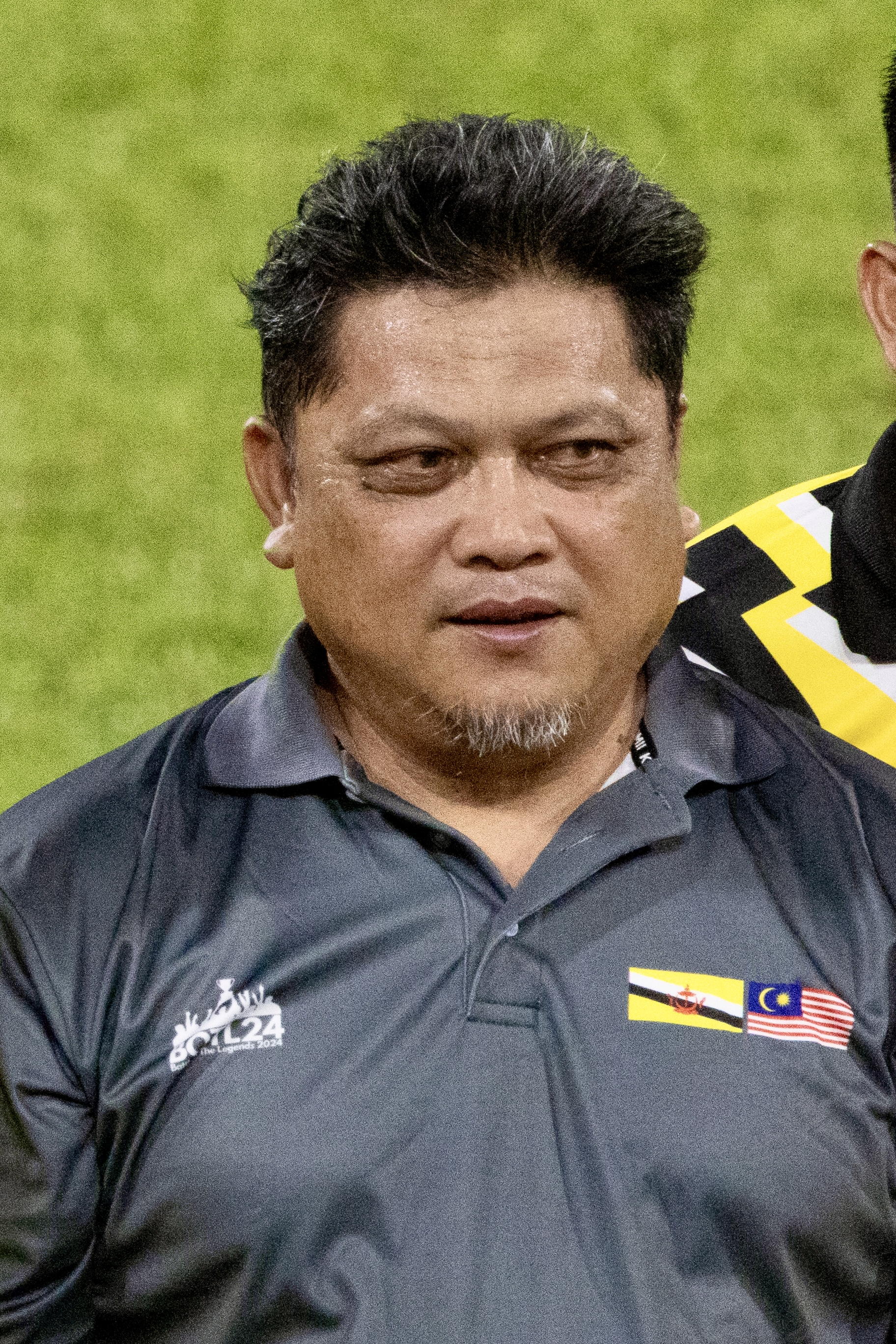
- Zainuddin in 2024

Personal information
- Full name: Haji Zainuddin bin Haji Kassim
- Date of birth: 1 November 1965 (age 60)
- Place of birth: Brunei
- Position: Striker

Senior career*
Years	Team	Apps	(Gls)
- Brunei

International career^{‡}
	Brunei	?	(3+)

Managerial career
- 1988: Brunei (player-coach)
- 2001: Brunei
- 2004: Brunei
- 2008–2011: AM Gunners
- 2011: Brunei U19
- 2013: Brunei U23 (assistant coach)
- 2020: Brunei (assistant coach)
- * Club domestic league appearances and goals as of 25 August 2015 ‡ National team caps and goals as of 25 August 2015

Haji Zainuddin bin Haji Kassim is a Bruneian former national football player and current coach.

Zainuddin played as a striker for the Bruneian representative team in the Malaysia league in the 80s and 90s. He made several appearances for the national side, and scored a goal in a 1986 World Cup qualifier against Hong Kong.

Zainuddin became a football coach afterwards. After a coaching stint for Brunei's M-League side while still registered as a player in 1988, he took charge of the national team for 6 games at the 2002 World Cup qualifying. He then turned to club football in 2008 with AM Gunners, coaching them until 2011 when the season was aborted abruptly. He was appointed Brunei Under-19 head coach in 2011, followed by being Brunei Under-23 assistant coach in 2013.

In 2020, he was appointed assistant coach of the Brunei national football team headed by Ali Hj Mustafa.
