= Oscar Amaro =

Brazilian footballer and manager (1945–2019)

Personal information
- Full name: Oscar Amaro de Silva
- Date of birth: 17 March 1945
- Place of birth: Jaguarão, Brazil
- Date of death: 30 August 2019 (aged 74)
- Place of death: Mooca, São Paulo, Brazil
- Position: Defender

Senior career*
Years	Team	Apps	(Gls)
1962–?	Grêmio		
1969–1974	Juventus		
- Rio Preto
- Portuguesa Santista
?–1979	Taubaté		

Managerial career
- 1979: Taubaté
- 1985: Brunei
- Radium
- Bragantino
- Paulista
- Anapolina
- União Barbarense
- 1998: Taquaritinga
- * Club domestic league appearances and goals

Oscar Amaro de Silva (17 March 1945 – 30 August 2019) was a Brazilian football player and manager.

== Playing career ==
Amaro was born in Jaguarão, A defender, he began playing football with Grêmio Foot-Ball Porto Alegrense where he would win the Campeonato Gaúcho. After playing for other clubs in the Rio Grande do Sul State championship, he joined Clube Atlético Juventus in 1969. After 1974, Amaro played for other clubs in São Paulo State before finishing his playing career with Esporte Clube Taubaté in 1979, but not before winning the Campeonato Paulista Série A2.

== Coaching career ==
Amaro was appointed Brunei national team coach in January 1985 on a two-year contract, Amaro was to be given a yearly salary equal to $77400, with the Brunei government covering it. Postponing his arrival in Brunei to celebrate Christmas and New Year with his family, the Brazilian trainer was the third foreigner to ever coach the country's national selection, endowing the nation's Football Association with a sense of optimism.

He led the Wasps in their 1985 Merlion Cup campaign.

He holds a Physical Education degree.
