= 2000 Myanmar Premier League =

Myanmar Premier League
- Season: 2000

The 2000 Myanmar Premier League season had 12 teams competing.

== Results ==
Pos	Team	Pld	W	D	L	GF–GA	Pts
1	Ministry of Finance and Revenue	11	11	0	0	41-9	33
2	Ministry of Home Affairs	11	6	3	2	26-16	21
3	Army	11	6	3	2	36-28	21
4	Ministry of Energy	11	6	1	4	26-24	19
5	Ministry of Defence	11	5	1	5	29-23	16
6	Ministry of Forestry	11	4	3	4	17-15	15
7	Royal FC	11	4	2	5	13-15	14
8	Ministry of Construction	11	3	5	3	24-26	14
9	Yangon City Development Committee	11	3	3	5	23-27	12
10	Ministry of Commerce	11	3	1	7	18-22	10
11	Ministry of Agriculture and Irrigation	11	2	1	8	17-42	7
12	Ministry of Railways	11	1	1	9	15-38	4

== See also ==
- 2003 Myanmar Premier League
- 2004 Myanmar Premier League
- 2005 Myanmar Premier League
- 2006 Myanmar Premier League
- 2007 Myanmar Premier League
- 2008 Myanmar Premier League
