= 2005 Myanmar Premier League =

Myanmar Premier League
- Season: 2005

The 2005 Myanmar Premier League season had 16 teams in competition. Finance and Revenue FC won the championship.

== Results ==
Pos	Team					GF–GA	diff
1	Finance and Revenue FC	15	15	0	0	64-10	45
2	Comn	15	11	3	1	47-11	36
3	Forestry	15	10	2	3	27-15	32
4	Transport	15	9	3	3	22-12	30
5	YC Development Committee	15	8	3	4	43-26	27
6	Defence	15	8	2	5	25-20	26
7	Construction	15	8	2	5	33-31	26
8	Banner	15	7	3	5	23-20	24
9	MAPT	15	7	2	6	25-23	23
10	Energy	15	6	3	6	31-22	21
11	Home Affairs	15	3	6	6	23-31	15
12	Kanbawza FC	15	4	1	10	15-17	13
13	Agriculture	15	3	1	11	22-44	10
14	Army (A)	15	2	3	10	18-48	9
15	Malikha	15	2	1	12	9-49	7
16	Padamya Naga (Ruby Dragon)						

== See also ==
- 2000 Myanmar Premier League
- 2003 Myanmar Premier League
- 2004 Myanmar Premier League
- 2006 Myanmar Premier League
- 2007 Myanmar Premier League
- 2008 Myanmar Premier League
