= Mike Wong Mun Heng =

Singaporean association football manager (born 1965)

Mike Wong
Personal information
- Full name: Mike Wong Mun Heng
- Date of birth: 3 October 1965 (age 61)
- Place of birth: Singapore

Managerial career
- Years: Team
- 2009–2012: Geylang United
- 2012: Singapore U-22
- 2014–2016: Brunei
- 2017–2018: Laos (technical director)
- 2017: Laos

Mike Wong Mun Heng is a Singaporean association football manager who was the head coach of Laos from June 2017 to August 2017.

== Managerial career ==
Wong managed Geylang United from January 2009 until March 2012. Wong was also in charge of the Singapore under-22 side which participated at the 2013 AFC U-22 Championship qualifiers.

Wong is appointed as technical director of Brunei national football team in October 2013 and as head coach of the national team in December 2014 making him the first Singaporean to lead a senior national team other than Singapore in a FIFA World Cup qualifiers.

In June 2017, Wong was appointed as the technical director of Laos national team while coaching them.

Wong was most recently the coach of the ACS (Independent) football team. He has notably led the A Division Boys to their first ever third runners-up finish in the 2026 National School Games.

== Statistics ==
=== Managerial ===
As of 27 September 2018

Team	from	to	Record				
Team	from	to	Games	Wins	Draws	Losses	Win %
(Singapore) Geylang United	March 2009	March 2012	?	?	?	?	?
Singapore U-22	2012		5	2	1	2	40.00
Brunei	December 2014	October 2016	11	2	0	9	18.18
Laos	June 2017	August 2017	6	1	0	5	16.67
Total			?	?	?	?	?
