= 2006 Myanmar Premier League =

Myanmar Premier League
- Season: 2006

The 2006 Myanmar Premier League season saw 16 teams in competition. Finance and Revenue FC won the championship.

== Results ==
Pos	Team					GF–GA	diff
1	Finance and Revenue FC	15	13	1	1	46- 4	40
2	Ministry of Commerce	15	10	4	1	40-12	34
3	Ministry of Energy	15	9	4	2	25-14	31
4	Transport	15	8	5	2	30-12	29
5	Banner	15	8	3	4	29-15	27
6	YC Development Committee	15	6	4	5	15-13	22
7	Kanbawza FC	15	6	4	5	15-17	22
8	Construction	15	6	3	6	12-12	21
9	A&I	15	6	1	8	13-27	19
10	Home Affairs	15	5	3	7	19-26	18
11	Forestry	15	5	2	8	21-21	17
12	Soon Ye	15	4	5	6	18-24	17
13	Defence	15	3	5	7	12-20	14
14	MAPT (Municipal)	15	3	5	7	13-27	14
15	Ministry of Rail Transportation	15	3	1	11	17-41	10
16	Army (A)	15	0	0	15	2-42	0

== See also ==
- 2000 Myanmar Premier League
- 2003 Myanmar Premier League
- 2004 Myanmar Premier League
- 2005 Myanmar Premier League
- 2007 Myanmar Premier League
- 2008 Myanmar Premier League
