= Myanmar Premier League =

- Founded: 1996
- Folded: 2009
- Country: Myanmar
- Confederation: AFC
- Number of clubs: 16
- Level on pyramid: 1
- Domestic cup: Myanmar Premier League Cup
- Last champions: Finance and Revenue
- Most championships: Finance and Revenue (11)

The Myanmar Premier League (since 2005 simply Myanmar League) was the top division of football in Myanmar from 1996 to 2009. The league consisted of Yangon-based football clubs, mostly run by various government ministries. The league was an attempt to reform the Burma First Division. Nonetheless, the Yangon-based league never gained traction and has been replaced by the Myanmar National League, the country's first ever professional league since March 2009. Finance and Revenue was the most successful club in the history of the MPL, winning 9 out of 13 championships.

== Winners ==
The winners are:

- 1996: Finance and Revenue
- 1997: Finance and Revenue
- 1998: Yangon City Development Committee
- 1999: Finance and Revenue
- 2000: Finance and Revenue
- 2001: Commerce
- 2002: Finance and Revenue
- 2003: Finance and Revenue
- 2004: Finance and Revenue
- 2005: Finance and Revenue
- 2006: Finance and Revenue
- 2007: Finance and Revenue
- 2008: Finance and Revenue
- 2009: Commerce

== See also ==
- Football in Burma
- Myanmar Football Federation
- Myanmar national football team
