= Football at the 1985 Brunei Merdeka Games =

Tournament details
- Host country: Brunei
- Dates: 24 March – 31 March
- Teams: 6

Final positions
- Champions: Singapore XI (1st title)
- Runners-up: Brunei

Tournament statistics
- Matches played: 9
- Goals scored: 28 (3.11 per match)

The football tournament at the 1985 Brunei Merdeka Games was held from June 24 to 31 in Bandar Seri Begawan, Brunei.

== Teams ==
The standard of the teams is not clear. Brunei and Philippines were probably the full national teams. Singapore is unlikely to have been the national team. Malaysia, Indonesia, and Thailand were definitely not (their full national teams were playing in World Cup qualifiers during this period). Indonesia was represented by a selection from the Perserikatan league.

== Group stage ==
=== Group A ===
Team	Pld	W	D	L	GF	GA	GD	Pts
Singapore XI	2	1	1	0	5	1	+4	3
Brunei	2	1	1	0	5	2	+3	3
Philippines	2	0	0	2	1	8	−7	0

24.03.1985

Brunei	4 – 1	Philippines

Bandar Seri Begawan

25.03.1985

Singapore XI	4 – 0	Philippines

Bandar Seri Begawan

26.03.1985

Brunei	1 – 1	Singapore XI

Bandar Seri Begawan

=== Group B ===
Team	Pld	W	D	L	GF	GA	GD	Pts
Malaysia XI	2	2	0	0	4	1	+3	4
Indonesia XI	2	1	0	1	2	2	0	2
Thailand XI	2	0	0	2	4	1	−3	0

25.03.1985

Malaysia XI	2 – 1	Thailand XI

Bandar Seri Begawan

26.03.1985

Malaysia XI	2 – 0	Indonesia XI

Bandar Seri Begawan

27.03.1985

Indonesia XI	2 – 0	Thailand XI

Bandar Seri Begawan

== Knockout stage ==
=== Semi-finals ===
29.03.1985

Brunei	4 – 2	Malaysia XI

Bandar Seri Begawan

29.03.1985

Singapore XI	2 – 0	Indonesia XI

Bandar Seri Begawan

=== Bronze medal match ===
Bronze medal match unknown (if any).

=== Gold medal match ===
31.03.1985

Brunei	1 – 1	Singapore XI
Penalties
	1 – 3

Bandar Seri Begawan
