= 2003 Myanmar Premier League =

Myanmar Premier League
- Season: 2003

The 2003 Myanmar Premier League season had 14 teams in competition. Finance and Revenue FC was the winning team.

== Results ==
Pos	Team					GF–GA	diff	Outcome
1	Finance and Revenue FC	13	11	1	1	49- 7	34	
2	Commerce and Trade	13	11	1	1	29-11	34	
3	Municipal	13	8	1	4	31-15	25	
4	Energy	13	8	1	4	26-13	25	
5	Banner	13	6	4	3	28-18	22	
6	Defense	13	7	1	5	35-27	22	
7	Transport	13	6	3	4	23-21	21	
8	Home Affair	13	6	1	6	26-30	19	
9	Ruby Dragon	13	4	1	8	21-36	13	
10	Construction	13	3	3	7	13-19	12	
11	Agriculture	13	3	2	8	23-37	11	
12	Forestry	13	3	2	8	20-34	11	
13	Army	13	3	1	9	12-36	10	Relegated
14	Electricity	13	1	0	12	11-42	3	Relegated

== See also ==
- 2000 Myanmar Premier League
- 2004 Myanmar Premier League
- 2005 Myanmar Premier League
- 2006 Myanmar Premier League
- 2007 Myanmar Premier League
- 2008 Myanmar Premier League
