= 2004 Myanmar Premier League =

Myanmar Premier League
- Season: 2004

The 2004 Myanmar Premier League season saw 16 teams in competition. Custom FC won the championship.

== Results ==
Pos	Team					GF–GA	diff	Outcome
1	Custom	15	13	1	1	58-10	40	
2	Energy	15	11	3	1	34-12	36	
3	Trade	15	10	4	1	37-10	34	
4	Defense	15	10	2	3	36-22	32	
5	Municipal	15	9	2	4	38-20	29	
6	Transport	15	9	2	4	28-20	29	
7	Construction	15	8	3	4	26-23	27	
8	Forestry	15	7	2	6	23-18	23	
9	Home Affair	15	6	1	8	22-25	19	
10	Army(A)	15	4	4	7	14-24	16	
11	Banner	15	4	3	8	18-22	15	
12	Agriculture	15	4	1	10	29-42	13	
13	Ruby Dragon	15	3	2	10	14-32	11	
14	Malikha	15	3	2	10	10-35	11	
15	Electricity	15	1	1	13	18-47	4	Relegated
16	Mine	15	1	1	13	8-51	4	Relegated

== See also ==
- 2000 Myanmar Premier League
- 2003 Myanmar Premier League
- 2005 Myanmar Premier League
- 2006 Myanmar Premier League
- 2007 Myanmar Premier League
- 2008 Myanmar Premier League
