= 1998 AFF Championship qualification =

Tournament details
- Host country: Myanmar; Singapore
- Dates: 14–28 March 1998
- Teams: 6
- Venues: 2 (in 2 host cities)

Tournament statistics
- Matches played: 6
- Goals scored: 17 (2.83 per match)

The 1998 AFF Championship qualification phase was co-hosted by Myanmar and Singapore from 14 to 18 March 1998 and 24 to 28 March 1998 respectively. There are three teams per group and the top two teams of each group qualify for the final tournament.

== Venues ==
Yangon	Singapore
Thuwunna Stadium	Jurong Stadium
Capacity: 50,000	Capacity: 30,000

== Qualification ==
=== Qualification Group A ===
Matches played in Myanmar.

Team	Pld	W	D	L	GF	GA	GD	Pts
Myanmar	2	2	0	0	7	1	+6	6
Laos	2	1	0	1	2	4	−2	3
Brunei	2	0	0	2	2	6	−4	0

14 March 1998

Myanmar	4–1	Brunei
Myo Myint Htwe; Myo Hlaing Win; Aung Khine; Tun Tun Soe	Report

Thuwunna Stadium, Yangon

16 March 1998

Laos	2–1	Brunei

Thuwunna Stadium, Yangon

18 March 1998

Myanmar	3–0	Laos
Myo Hlaing Win; Tun Tun Soe	Report

Thuwunna Stadium, Yangon

=== Qualification Group B ===
Matches played in Singapore.

Team	Pld	W	D	L	GF	GA	GD	Pts
Singapore	2	2	0	0	4	0	+4	6
Philippines	2	0	1	1	1	2	−1	1
Cambodia	2	0	1	1	1	4	−3	1

24 March 1998

Singapore	1–0	Philippines
Khairon 12'	Report

Jurong Stadium, Singapore
Attendance: 4,000

26 March 1998

Cambodia	1–1	Philippines
28'	Report	Fegidero 86'

Jurong Stadium, Singapore

28 March 1998

Singapore	3–0	Cambodia

Jurong Stadium, Singapore

== Qualified teams ==
Teams who finished top two in the two groups qualified for the main tournament.

Team	Main tournament standing
Myanmar	5th/Group Stage
Singapore	Champions
Laos	7th/Group Stage
Philippines	8th/Group Stage
