= Said Abdullah =

Bruneian footballer

Personal information
- Full name: Mohammad Sadiy bin Abdullah Tujoh
- Date of birth: 20 September 1966 (age 60)
- Place of birth: Brunei
- Positions: Attacking midfielder; forward

Senior career*
Years	Team	Apps	(Gls)
1993–1999	Brunei		

International career^{‡}
1993–2001	Brunei	13+	(5+)
- * Club domestic league appearances and goals as of 17 April 2017 ‡ National team caps and goals as of 28 April 2021

Mohammad Sadiy bin Abdullah Tujoh (born 20 September 1966), better known as Said Abdullah, is a Bruneian former footballer who played as a second striker or in an advanced midfield role. One of the stars of Bruneian football in the mid-nineties playing for the Brunei national representative team in the Malaysian league, he was a member of the 1999 Malaysia Cup winning side, deemed as Brunei's greatest footballing feat.

Although his given name is Sadiy, it is often mistaken for Saidy or more frequently Said, which would become his default name in publications during his playing years.

== National career ==
Said began playing for the Wasps in 1993 under English coach Mick Lyons. Perennial minnows at first (Brunei finished in last place in the inaugural 1994 Liga Perdana), Brunei improved on their league finish towards the end of the century, finishing an all-time high of third place in 1998.

Said was part of the Brunei squad in 1999 to win the Malaysia Cup. It was to be his final year with the M-League team as he immediately retired from the team along with six other players.

== International career ==
Said regularly played for the Brunei national football team at the Southeast Asian Games of the nineties, scoring six (known) goals. He scored twice in two defeats at the group stage of the 17th SEA Games held in Singapore in 1993, against Laos and Malaysia. Two years later in Indonesia, Said scored Brunei's solitary goal of the 19th SEA Games against Myanmar in a 1–6 defeat.

When Brunei hosted the SEA Games in 1999, Said scored twice in Brunei's opening group stage match against Cambodia in a 3–3 draw. The point gained at the Berakas Sports Complex would ultimately be Brunei's only one for the tournament.

Sadiy was a surprise inclusion for Brunei's 2002 World Cup qualifying campaign in early 2001, two years after his retirement from the national team. He played in all six games where Brunei remained winless and goalless, suffering a record 0–12 loss at the hands of the United Arab Emirates. Brunei would not play another World Cup qualifier until 2015.

== Honours ==
Brunei M-League team

- Malaysia Cup: 1999

== Personal life ==
Sadiy is a firefighter off the pitch, with the rank of Deputy Station Officer of Sungai Liang Fire Station. He is currently active in veteran football, winning three VFA Sumbangsih Cups with Al-Idrus FC Veterans.
