= Brunei national football team =

Men's football team

Brunei Darussalam
- Nickname: Tebuan (The Wasps)
- Association: Football Association of Brunei Darussalam (FABD)
- Confederation: AFC (Asia)
- Sub-confederation: AFF (Southeast Asia)
- Head coach: Helme Panjang
- Captain: Azwan Ali Rahman
- Most caps: Azwan Saleh (36)
- Top scorer: Azwan Ali Rahman (9)
- Home stadium: Hassanal Bolkiah National Stadium
- FIFA code: BRU

FIFA ranking
- Current: 196 ▼2 (7 October 2026)
- Highest: 140 (December 1992)
- Lowest: 203 (October 2012)

First international
- Malaysia 8–0 Brunei (Bangkok, Thailand; 22 May 1971)

Biggest win
- Brunei 4–0 Timor-Leste (Kuching, Malaysia; 2 November 2016); Brunei 6–2 Timor-Leste (Bandar Seri Begawan, Brunei; 5 November 2022)

Biggest defeat
- Brunei 0–12 United Arab Emirates (Bandar Seri Begawan, Brunei; 14 April 2001)

AFC Challenge Cup
- Appearances: 1 (first in 2006)
- Best result: Group stage (2006)

AFC Solidarity Cup
- Appearances: 1 (first in 2016)
- Best result: Fourth place (2016)

AFF Championship
- Appearances: 2 (first in 1996)
- Best result: Group stage (1996, 2022)

ASEAN Challenge Cup
- Appearances: 1 (first in 2026)
- Best result: Group stage (2026)
- Website: the-fabd.com

The Brunei national football team (Malay: Pasukan bola sepak kebangsaan Brunei; recognised as Brunei Darussalam by FIFA), nicknamed Tebuan (The Wasps), is the national team of Brunei, controlled by the Football Association of Brunei Darussalam. The team was founded in 1959 and joined FIFA in 1969. In the past, they have also frequently featured in the Malaysian league and cup competitions as one of the state representative sides.

The Brunei State Football Amateur Association was formed on 15 March 1956. In 1993, the word "Amateur" was dropped, and they were known as the Brunei Football Association. Brunei's experience of international football has been more or less restricted to regional Asian competitions, such as the Southeast Asian Games and the AFF Championship. So far, Brunei has entered the FIFA World Cup qualifiers only five times, in 1986, 2002, 2018, 2022, and 2026. On these occasions, they did not qualify for the competition. They have made eight appearances in the AFC Asian Cup qualifiers, entering the third round for the first time via the play-off round in 2024.

== History ==
=== Early days ===
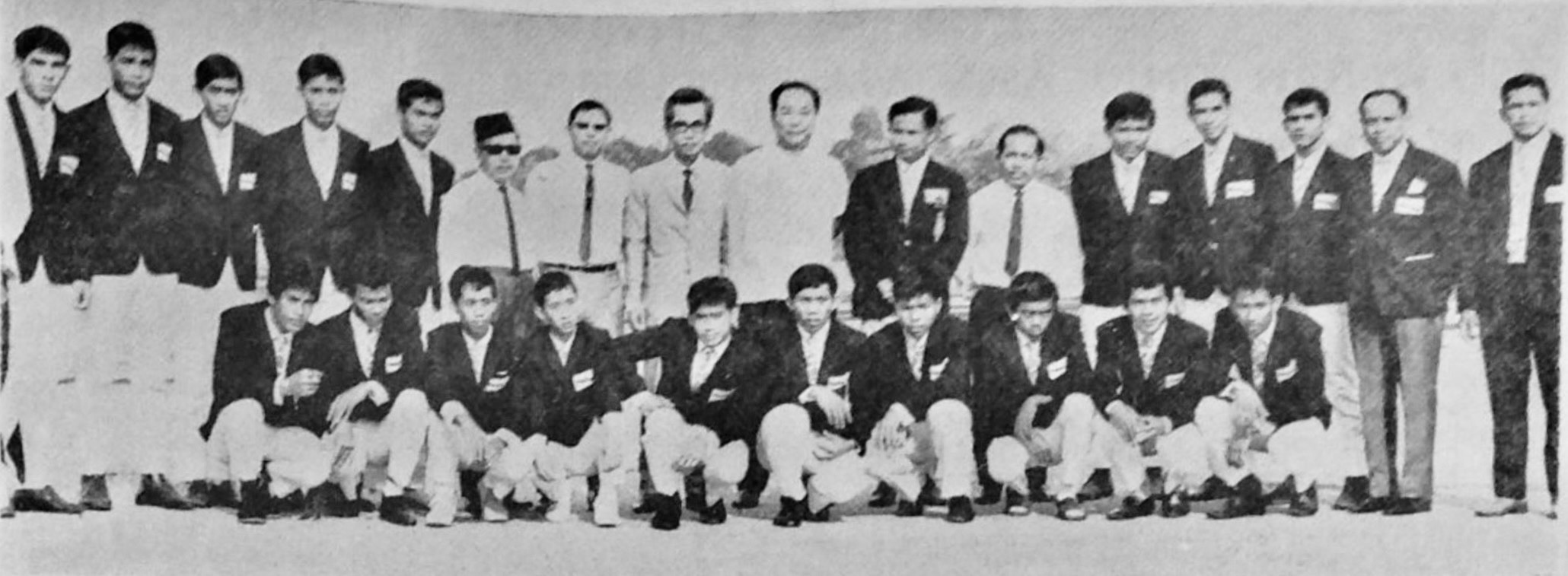
Brunei national football team of 18 players and 4 officers posed for a photo together with Pengiran Yusuf at Berakas Airport in 1970

The national team's first appearance took place during the 1972 AFC Asian Cup qualification, where they were unable to qualify after all three heavy defeats. The following two championships (1976 and 1977) were no different from the first, with their first and second victory during the 1980 Summer Olympics. In 1979, Brunei entered a team to compete in the professional Malaysian league and despite competing against Malaysian clubs, Brunei had previously never made an impact. However, in 1999, they shocked everyone by lifting the Malaysia Cup.

Brunei became the runners-up of the Brunei Merdeka Games trophy in 1985. Since then, team was not able to qualify into or win any major tournaments. Coming the closest was the 1993 Philippines International Cup, where they came in third position after a 1–0 victory against the Philippines. Brunei was then invited for the inaugural 2006 AFC Challenge Cup held in Bangladesh being grouped with Sri Lanka, Bhutan and Nepal. Brunei narrowly lost to Sri Lanka 1–0 before bouncing back from their defeat in the second match winning against Nepal 2–1 however with them needing the win in the last fixture, Brunei ended up in a goalless draw crashing out from the cup splitting the same points as Nepal but on goal differences.

=== Suspension ===
In September 2009, the Brunei Football Association (BAFA) was suspended due to governmental interference in its affairs, which started with a decision by the Brunei authorities to dissolve BAFA and to replace it with a new federation in December 2008. The suspension was applied with immediate effect and meant that the Brunei club DPMM were no longer permitted to play in the Singapore S.League until it was resolved. DPMM has confirmed to Football Association of Singapore (FAS) that they are unable to finish their S.League season because of the issue with its association. FIFA rejected FAS's final request on 17 October 2009 to permit DPMM to compete in the current S.League season while BAFA's suspension persisted.

On 19 March 2010, the FIFA Executive Committee agreed to submit to the next FIFA Congress the expulsion of the association if the BAFA has not been reinstated by then, after noting that no major progress had been made since the BAFA was suspended in September 2009. FIFA warned that unless BAFA came to FIFA's Congress on 9 and 10 June in South Africa having met the conditions for reinstatement it would be expelled. Brunei were re-instated on 31 May 2011 and the National Football Association of Brunei Darussalam (NFABD) was formed that same year.

=== Reform ===
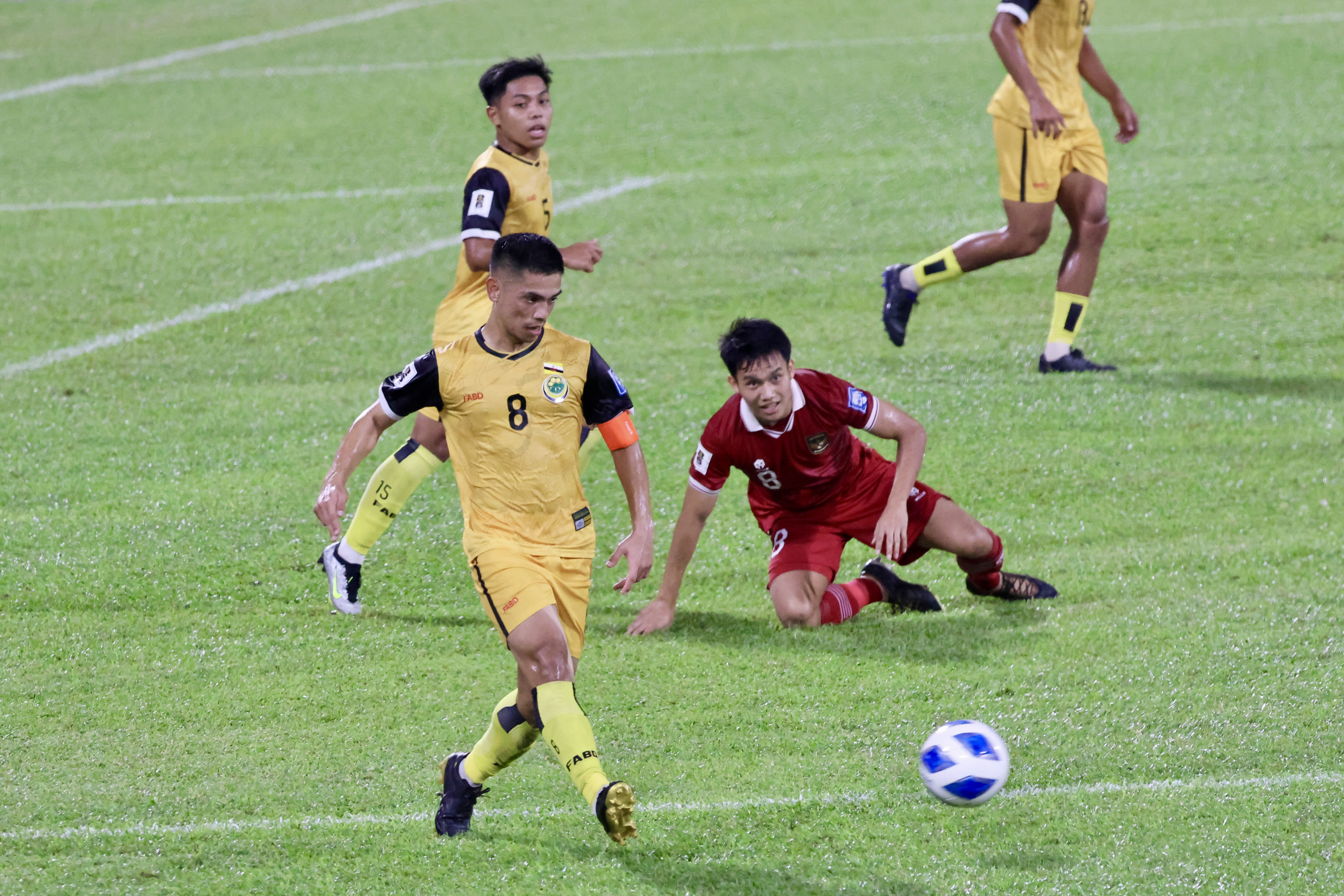
Brunei captain, Hendra Azam playing against Indonesia during the first round of the 2026 FIFA World Cup Qualification

Upon returning to the football action, the Wasps were unable to qualify for both the 2012 and 2014 AFF Championship following several losses. Brunei was again defeated 2–1 in aggregate against the Chinese Taipei during the 2018 FIFA World Cup Qualification in March 2015. The wasps failed to qualify for the 2016 AFF Championship after suffering defeats from Cambodia and Laos. Brunei was then invited to the 2016 AFC Solidarity Cup where they finished in fourth place after losing 3–2 to Laos. Despite the disappointment, Shah Razen Said from the Bruneian side managed to become the tournament's top scorer, finishing with a total of 4 goals.

Timor-Leste defeated Brunei in the second leg 2018 AFF Championship qualifying match at the Hassanal Bolkiah National Stadium on 8 September 2018, securing their spot in the 2018 AFF Championship final round group action for the first time in 14 years. Despite having a two-goal advantage from the first leg, Timor-Leste fell 1–0 but still advanced with a 3–2 aggregate score. Brunei defeated Mongolia 2–1 on 11 June 2019, but were unable to advance to the next stage of the preliminary joint qualification for the 2022 FIFA World Cup and the 2023 AFC Asian Cup.

=== Return to the AFF Championship ===
Under new coach Mario Rivera, Brunei managed to qualify to the 2022 AFF Championship for the first time in 26 years since its inaugural edition in 1996, by defeating Timor-Leste 6–3 on aggregate. The Wasps were grouped with Thailand, Indonesia, Philippines and Cambodia. They finished the group stage without gaining a single point, conceding at least 5 goals in every game with Razimie Ramlli scoring against the Philippines and Nur Ikhwan Othman scoring against Cambodia.

On 17 October 2023, Brunei returned to the Hassanal Bolkiah National Stadium after four years since their last match against Mongolia in 2019 for their fixture against Indonesia in the first round of the 2026 FIFA World Cup qualification. The Wasps were beaten 0–12 on aggregate, knocking them out of the qualification in the first round.

=== 2024 win streak ===
In 2024, FIFA invited Brunei to the 2024 FIFA Series held in March in Jeddah, Saudi Arabia where they would face their first ever opponents outside of their confederation. On 22 March, Brunei faced off against CONCACAF opponent Bermuda but conceded two late goals, losing 2–0. Four days later, Brunei came against Vanuatu and won the match 3–2, when three minutes into stoppage time Hakeme Yazid Said's direct free kick sealed the victory against their opponents from Oceania.

Later in June of that year, Brunei invited the Sri Lanka national team to two friendly matches in the country in conjunction with the FIFA calendar. Headed by interim coach Rui Capela Batista, Brunei extended their winning form to three which is the first time in their history after captain Azwan Ali Rahman scored the only goal in both games held at the Hassanal Bolkiah National Stadium on 8 and 11 June respectively.

The following September, Brunei registered two wins against Macau with an aggregate of 4–0 during the 2027 AFC Asian Cup qualification play-off round to further stretch the streak to five games and thus gaining their spot at the third qualification round of the 2027 AFC Asian Cup qualification. The following month, they failed to qualify for the 2024 ASEAN Championship, losing to Timor-Leste 0–1 on aggregate. A friendly in Russia organised by the Russian Football Union was then held in November and resulted in a 11–0 heavy defeat, with the squad marred by an indiscipline scandal that led to several suspensions meted out to offending players.

Brunei finished their 2027 AFC Asian Cup qualification behind Lebanon, Yemen and Bhutan with three points in six games. In June, they failed to qualify for the 2026 ASEAN Championship, losing to Timor-Leste 6–1 on aggregate.

== Team image ==
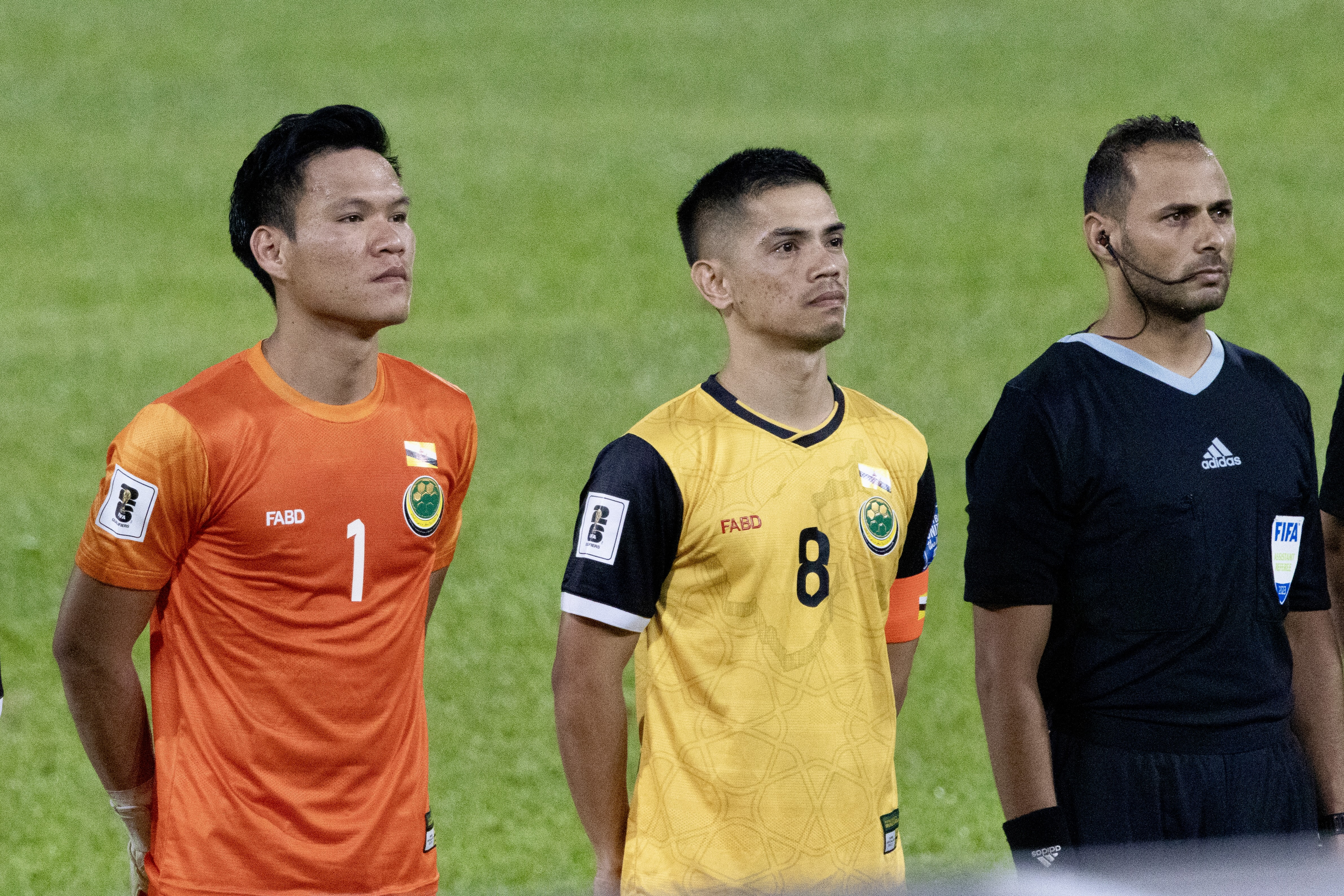
Goalkeeper (left) and home kits (right) of Brunei in 2023

=== Kit ===
Brunei had initially worn a predominantly yellow pattern as their home kit adorned with white or black since their inception in 1956 to represent the colours of their flags.

=== Home stadium ===
Brunei's home stadium is the Hassanal Bolkiah National Stadium in Bandar Seri Begawan. The stadium capacity is 28,000. From 2021 to 2022, Brunei used the Track and Field Sports Complex as an alternative stadium as their main stadium were undergoing renovation works. However, as the Track and Field Sports Complex does not meet the required standards, Brunei chose the Kuala Lumpur Stadium in Malaysia as their home ground for their 2022 AFF Championship matches.

Brunei national football team home stadiums
Image	Stadium	Capacity	Location	Last match
	Hassanal Bolkiah National Stadium	28,000	Bandar Seri Begawan	v Lebanon (18 November 2025; 2027 AFC Asian Cup qualification)
	Track & Field Sports Complex	1,700	Bandar Seri Begawan	v (Malaysia) Sabah FC (6 September 2023; Unofficial friendly)

== Results and fixtures ==
The following is a list of match results in the last 12 months, as well as any future matches that have been scheduled.

Win Draw Loss Fixture

=== 2026 ===
31 March 2027 AFC Asian Cup qualification	Bhutan	2–1	Brunei	Guwahati, India
18:00 UTC+5:30	Gyeltshen 39', 45+2'	Report; Report (AFC)	Hakeme 29'	Stadium: Indira Gandhi Athletic Stadium; Attendance: 549; Referee: Venkatesh Ramachandran (India)

2 June 2026 ASEAN Championship qualification	Brunei	0–3	Timor-Leste	Bandar Seri Begawan, Brunei
20:15 UTC+8		Report	Rangel 27'; Zenivio 43' (pen.); Oatnasio 90+2'	Stadium: Hassanal Bolkiah National Stadium; Attendance: 2,186; Referee: Ahmad A'Qashah (Singapore)

9 June 2026 ASEAN Championship qualification	Timor-Leste	3–1	Brunei	Kuala Lumpur, Malaysia
17:00 UTC+8	Cruz 55'; Osorio 62'; Oatnasio 80'	Report	Azwan 43'	Stadium: Kuala Lumpur Stadium; Attendance: 250; Referee: Sivakorn Pu-Udom (Thailand)

24 September 2026 FIFA ASEAN Challenge Cup Group A	Laos	3–1	Brunei	Kowloon, Hong Kong
17:00 UTC+8	Bounkong 4' (pen.); Singsavang 24'; Chernvanglien 67'	Report	Haziq N. 45+1'	Stadium: Mong Kok Stadium; Referee: Wong Wai Lun (Hong Kong)

30 September 2026 FIFA ASEAN Challenge Cup Group A	Hong Kong	2–0	Brunei	Kowloon, Hong Kong
20:00 UTC+8	Chan Siu Kwan 60'; Orr 90+1'	Report		Stadium: Kai Tak Stadium; Referee: Abdullo Davlatov (Tajikistan)

14 November 2026 King's Cup	Thailand	6–0	Brunei	Sisaket, Thailand
19:30 UTC+7	Ishyra 3' (o.g.); Yotsakorn 60', 74', 80'; Weidersjö 51'; Anan 67'	Report		Stadium: Sisaket Provincial Stadium; Attendance: 14,319; Referee: Koki Nagamine (Japan)

17 November 2026 King's Cup	Oman	7–0	Brunei	Sisaket, Thailand
16:00 UTC+7	Al-Ghafri 19'; Al-Balushi 28', 45+3', 63'; Al-Aghbari 34', 54'; Danial Hariz 90+2' (o.g.)	Report		Stadium: Sisaket Provincial Stadium; Attendance: 2,659; Referee: Alongkorn Khonwai (Thailand)

== Coaching staff ==
Position	Name
Technical Director	(Brazil) Fabio Maciel
Head coach	(Brunei) Helme Panjang
Team manager	(Brunei) Ah Chua Bangau
Assistant coach	(Brunei) Rosmin Kamis
Goalkeeping coach	(Brunei) Omar Nur Aqammaddin Sallehuddin
Kitman	(Brunei) Roney Morni
Media officer	(Brunei) Khairi Zuhair

=== Coaching history ===
Caretaker coaches are listed in italics.

- (Singapore) John Then (1959–71)
- (Brunei) Abdul Karim Pukul & (Brunei) Ibrahim Yahya (1971)
- (Scotland) Duncan McDowell (1976–81)
- (Brunei) Ibrahim Damit (1982)
- (Brunei) Idris Damit (1983)
- (Uruguay) Danny Bergara (1984)
- (Brazil) Oscar Amaro de Silva (1985–86)
- (Brunei) Dayem Ali (1987)
- (Brunei) Zainuddin Kassim (1988)
- (Brunei) Dayem Ali (1989)
- (Singapore) Hussein Aljunied (1990–93)
- (England) Mick Lyons (1993–95)
- (Australia) Bobby McLachlan (1995)
- (England) David Booth (1996–98)
- (England) Mick Jones (1998–01)
- (Brunei) Zainuddin Kassim (2001)
- (England) Mick Lyons (2002)
- (Morocco) Karim Bencherifa (2003–04)
- (Bosnia and Herzegovina) Amir Alagić (2005)
- (Croatia) Ranko Buketa (2005)
- (Brunei) Ali Mustafa (2006)
- (South Korea) Kwon Oh-son (2008)
- (Croatia) Vjeran Simunić (2008–09)
- (Brunei) Ali Mustafa (2009–11)
- (Brunei) Dayem Ali (2011)
- (South Korea) Kwon Oh-son (2012–13)
- (Croatia) Vjeran Simunić (2013–14)
- (Scotland) Steve Kean (2014)
- (Singapore) Mike Wong (2014–16)
- (South Korea) Kwon Oh-son (2016)
- (Singapore) Stephen Ng (2017)
- (South Korea) Kwon Oh-son (2018)
- (Netherlands) Robbie Servais (2019)
- (England) Paul Smalley (2019–20)
- (Brunei) Ali Mustafa (2020)
- (Malaysia) K. Rajagobal (2020–22)
- (Brunei) Rosanan Samak (2022)
- (Spain) Mario Rivera (2022–24)
- (Portugal) Rui Capela (2024)
- (Scotland) Jamie McAllister (2024)
- (Brazil) Vinícius Eutrópio (2024–25)
- (Brazil) Fábio Maciel (2025–26)
- (Brunei) Ali Mustafa (2026)
- (Brunei) Helme Panjang (2026–)

== Players ==
=== Current squad ===
The following 18 players are called up for the 2026 King's Cup held in Sisaket, Thailand from 14 to 17 November.

Information correct as of 17 November 2026, after the match against Oman.

No.	Pos.	Player	Date of birth (age)	Caps	Goals	Club
18	GK	Ishyra Asmin Jabidi	9 July 1998 (age 28)	5	0	(Football Association of Brunei Darussalam) DPMM
20	GK	Jefri Syafiq Ishak	21 May 2002 (age 24)	1	0	(Football Association of Brunei Darussalam) DPMM II
2	DF	Azri Danial Yusra	25 August 2008 (age 18)	2	0	(Football Association of Brunei Darussalam) DPMM II
3	DF	Danial Hariz Shukrin	23 March 2004 (age 22)	2	0	(Football Association of Brunei Darussalam) Indera
4	DF	Azrin Danial Yusra	11 February 2006 (age 20)	4	0	(Football Association of Brunei Darussalam) DPMM II
6	DF	Syafiq Safiuddin Abdul Shariff	16 July 2002 (age 24)	11	1	(Football Association of Brunei Darussalam) DPMM
21	DF	Nazry Aiman Azaman	1 July 2004 (age 22)	17	1	(Football Association of Brunei Darussalam) DPMM
22	DF	Martin Haddy Khallidden	21 April 1998 (age 28)	6	0	(Football Association of Brunei Darussalam) DPMM
5	MF	Wafiq Danish Hasimulabdillah	13 January 2005 (age 21)	2	0	(Football Association of Brunei Darussalam) Kasuka
11	MF	Haziq Naqiuddin Syamra	26 May 2004 (age 22)	10	1	(Football Association of Brunei Darussalam) DPMM II
13	MF	Hanif Farhan Azman	2 November 2000 (age 26)	19	0	(Football Association of Brunei Darussalam) MS ABDB
14	MF	Haziq Kasyful Azim Hasimulabdillah	24 December 1998 (age 27)	20	0	(Football Association of Brunei Darussalam) Kasuka
15	MF	Adi Shukry Salleh	25 September 2000 (age 26)	2	0	(Football Association of Brunei Darussalam) MS ABDB
16	MF	Abdul Hariz Herman	24 September 2000 (age 26)	23	1	(Football Association of Brunei Darussalam) DPMM
17	MF	Faturrahman Embran	22 August 1999 (age 27)	15	0	(Football Association of Brunei Darussalam) DPMM II
19	MF	Hadif Aiman Adanan	19 October 2001 (age 25)	2	0	(Football Association of Brunei Darussalam) MS ABDB
9	FW	Hariz Danial Khallidden	1 November 1996 (age 30)	22	0	(Football Association of Brunei Darussalam) MS ABDB
10	FW	Sahfiq Hidayat Sahrizam	8 September 2002 (age 24)	2	0	(Football Association of Brunei Darussalam) DPMM II

=== Recent call-ups ===
The following players have also been called up to the Brunei squad in the last twelve months.

Pos.	Player	Date of birth (age)	Caps	Goals	Club	Latest call-up
GK	Haimie Abdullah Nyaring	31 May 1998 (age 28)	34	0	(Brunei) DPMM	2026 FIFA ASEAN Challenge Cup
GK	Khairul Hisyam Norihwan	7 August 2004 (age 22)	0	0	(Brunei) Indera	2026 FIFA ASEAN Challenge Cup^{PRE}
GK	Abdul Azeez Elyas	9 August 1998 (age 28)	0	0	(Brunei) DPMM II	v. Bhutan; 31 March 2026
GK	Ahsanuddin Dani	13 March 1994 (age 32)	0	0	(Brunei) Indera	v. Bhutan; 31 March 2026^{PRE}
DF	Nurikhwan Othman	15 January 1993 (age 33)	29	2	(Brunei) DPMM	2026 FIFA ASEAN Challenge Cup
DF	Wafi Aminuddin	20 August 2000 (age 26)	20	1	(Brunei) Kasuka	2026 FIFA ASEAN Challenge Cup
DF	Azhari Danial Yusra	30 June 2003 (age 23)	0	0	(Brunei) Indera	2026 FIFA ASEAN Challenge Cup
DF	Hanif Hamir	22 February 1997 (age 29)	29	0	(Brunei) DPMM	2026 FIFA ASEAN Challenge Cup
DF	Yura Indera Putera Yunos	25 March 1996 (age 30)	28	0	(Brunei) DPMM	2026 FIFA ASEAN Challenge Cup^{PRE}
DF	Hibatur Rahman Mohamad	1 January 2000 (age 26)	4	0	(Brunei) MS ABDB	2026 FIFA ASEAN Challenge Cup^{PRE}
DF	Amirul Aizad Zaidi	29 July 2002 (age 24)	0	0	(Brunei) Indera	2026 FIFA ASEAN Challenge Cup^{PRE}
DF	Afi Aminuddin	9 October 1991 (age 35)	24	0	(Brunei) Kasuka	2026 ASEAN Championship qualification
DF	Abdul Mu'iz Sisa	20 April 1991 (age 35)	22	1	(Brunei) Kasuka	2026 ASEAN Championship qualification
MF	Azwan Ali Rahman (captain)	11 January 1992 (age 34)	34	9	(Brunei) DPMM	2026 FIFA ASEAN Challenge Cup
MF	Hanif Aiman Adanan	4 March 2000 (age 26)	2	0	(Brunei) Kasuka	2026 FIFA ASEAN Challenge Cup
MF	Alinur Rashimy Jufri	12 June 2000 (age 26)	18	0	(Brunei) Kasuka	2026 FIFA ASEAN Challenge Cup
MF	Nur Asyraffahmi Norsamri	4 May 2000 (age 26)	14	0	(Brunei) Kasuka	2026 FIFA ASEAN Challenge Cup^{PRE}
MF	Aimmil Rahman Ramlee	9 April 1995 (age 31)	0	0	(Brunei) Indera	2026 FIFA ASEAN Challenge Cup^{PRE}
MF	Faris Fadillah Saiful Bahari	1 January 2008 (age 18)	0	0	(Brunei) DPMM II	2026 FIFA ASEAN Challenge Cup^{PRE}
MF	Syafiq Hilmi Shahrom	3 April 2006 (age 20)	0	0	(Brunei) Kasuka	2026 FIFA ASEAN Challenge Cup^{PRE}
MF	Amin Sisa	2 January 1998 (age 28)	5	0	(Brunei) Indera	v. Bhutan; 31 March 2026
MF	Khairil Shahme Suhaimi	16 April 1993 (age 33)	25	0	(Brunei) Kasuka	v. Bhutan; 31 March 2026^{PRE}
FW	Nazirrudin Ismail	27 December 1998 (age 27)	28	2	(Brunei) MS PPDB	2026 FIFA ASEAN Challenge Cup
FW	Hakeme Yazid Said	8 February 2003 (age 23)	27	4	(Brunei) DPMM	2026 FIFA ASEAN Challenge Cup
FW	Ali Munawwar Abdul Rahman	30 June 2004 (age 22)	2	0	(Brunei) MS ABDB	2026 FIFA ASEAN Challenge Cup
FW	Arshyad Taqiuddin Abdul Rahim		0	0	(Brunei) Kasuka U19	2026 FIFA ASEAN Challenge Cup^{PRE}
FW	Abdul Azim Abdul Rasid	24 April 1996 (age 30)	2	0	(Brunei) DPMM II	2026 ASEAN Championship qualification
FW	Adi Said	15 October 1990 (age 36)	30	7	(Brunei) Kasuka	2026 ASEAN Championship qualification
Notes: STD = On standby; PRE = Preliminary squad; INJ = Injured; RET = Retired from international duty

== Player records ==
As of 30 September 2026
Players in bold are still active with Brunei.

=== Most appearances ===
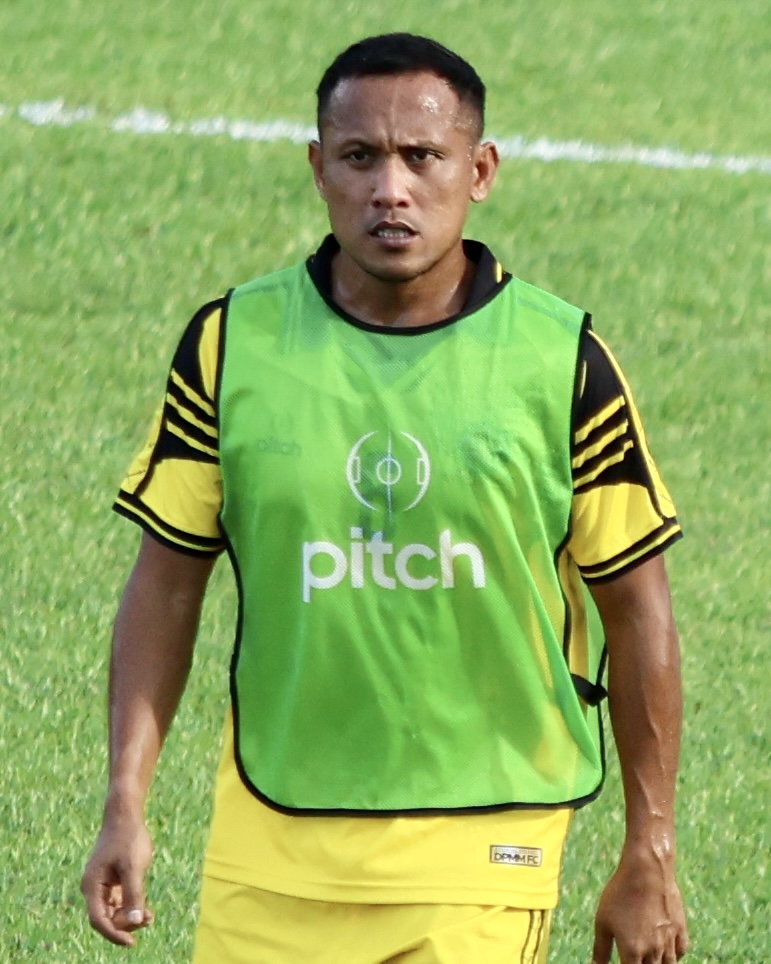
Azwan Saleh is Brunei's most capped player with 36 appearances.

Rank	Name	Caps	Goals	Career
1	Azwan Saleh	36	3	2006–2025
2	**Azwan Ali Rahman**	34	9	2012–present
2	**Haimie Abdullah Nyaring**	34	0	2016–present
4	**Adi Said**	30	7	2012–present
4	Najib Tarif	30	1	2008–2024
6	**Hanif Hamir**	29	0	2009–present
6	**Nurikhwan Othman**	29	0	2012–present
8	**Nazirrudin Ismail**	28	2	2022–present
8	**Yura Indera Putera Yunos**	28	0	2012–present
10	**Hakeme Yazid Said**	27	4	2022–present

=== Top goalscorers ===
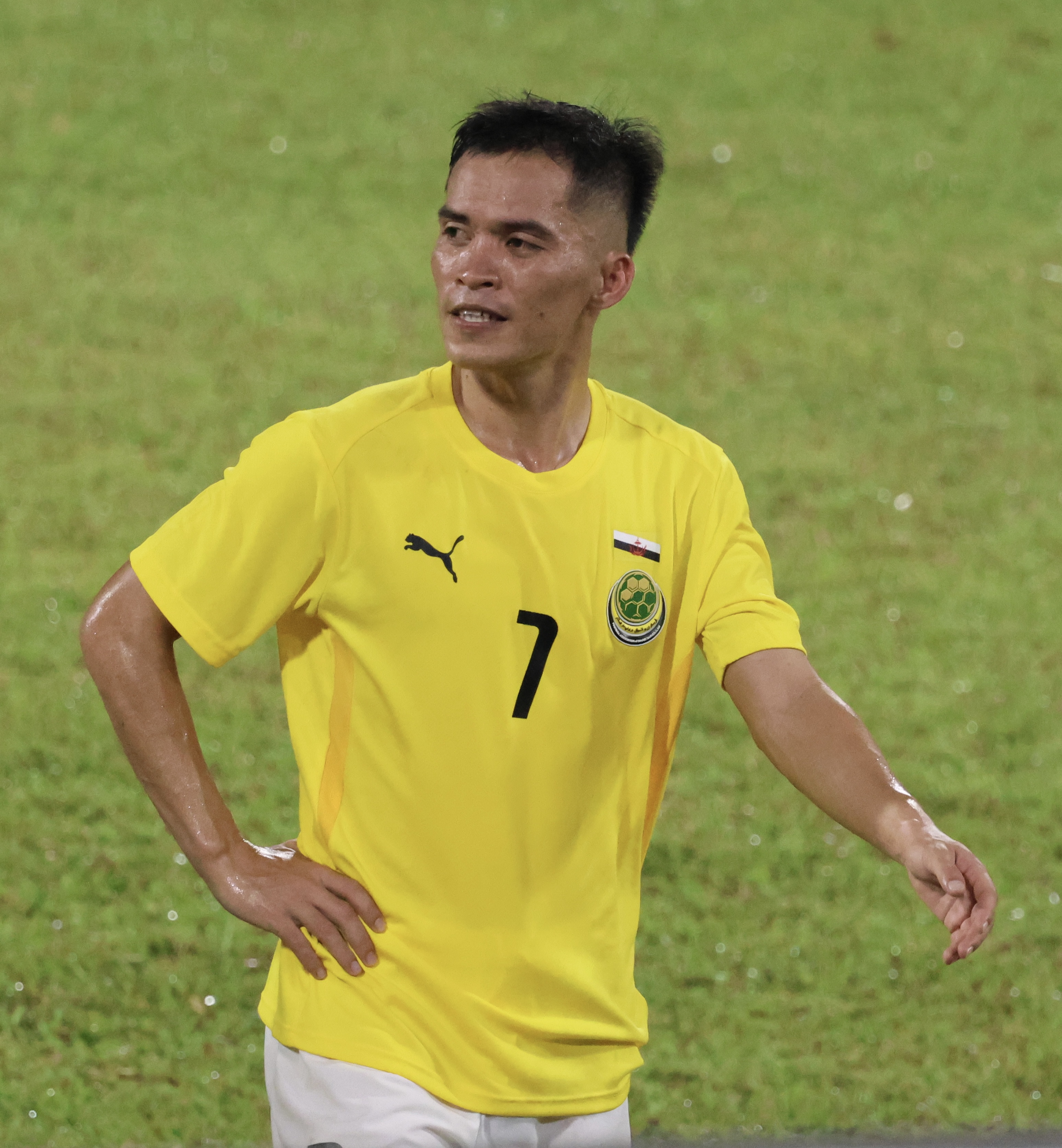
Azwan Ali Rahman is Brunei's all-time top scorer with 9 goals.

Rank	Name	Goals	Caps	Ratio	Career
1	**Azwan Ali Rahman**	9	34	0.26	2012–present
2	Shah Razen Said	8	24	0.33	2008–2019
3	**Adi Said**	7	30	0.23	2012–present
4	Razimie Ramlli	6	20	0.3	2016–2024
5	Said Abdullah	5	14	0.36	1993–2001
6	**Hakeme Yazid Said**	4	27	0.15	2022–present
7	Jamhari Lani	3	9	0.33	1985–1987
7	Adie Arsham Salleh	3	10	0.3	2006–2009
7	Hardi Bujang	3	12	0.25	2006–2008
7	Zainuddin Kassim	3	16	0.19	1982–1989
7	Abdul Azizi Ali Rahman	3	19	0.16	2015–2023
7	Azwan Saleh	3	36	0.08	2006–present

== Competition records ==
=== FIFA World Cup ===
FIFA World Cup									Qualification					
Year	Round	Position	Pld	W	D	L	F	A	Pld	W	D	L	F	A
(Uruguay) 1930 to (Brazil) 1950	Part of United Kingdom								Part of United Kingdom					
(Switzerland) 1954 to (Mexico) 1970	Not a FIFA member								Not a FIFA member					
(West Germany) 1974 to (Spain) 1982	Did not enter								Did not enter					
(Mexico) 1986	Did not qualify								6	0	0	6	2	29
(Italy) 1990 to (France) 1998	Did not enter								Did not enter					
(South Korea) (Japan) 2002	Did not qualify								6	0	0	6	0	28
(Germany) 2006 and (South Africa) 2010	Did not enter								Did not enter					
(Brazil) 2014	Suspended								Suspended					
(Russia) 2018	Did not qualify								2	1	0	1	1	2
(Qatar) 2022	Did not qualify								2	1	0	1	2	3
(Canada) (Mexico) (United States) 2026	Did not qualify								2	0	0	2	0	12
(Morocco) (Portugal) (Spain) 2030	To be determined								To be determined					
(Saudi Arabia) 2034	To be determined								To be determined					
Total		0/5							18	2	0	16	5	74

=== AFC Asian Cup ===
AFC Asian Cup record									AFC Asian Cup qualification					
Year	Result	Position	Pld	W	D*	L	GF	GA	Pld	W	D	L	GF	GA
(Hong Kong) 1956	Did not enter								Did not enter					
(South Korea) 1960	Did not enter								Did not enter					
(Israel) 1964	Did not enter								Did not enter					
(Iran) 1968	Did not enter								Did not enter					
(Thailand) 1972	Did not qualify								3	0	0	3	0	27
(Iran) 1976	Did not qualify								3	0	0	3	1	19
(Kuwait) 1980	Withdrew								Withdrew					
(Singapore) 1984	Withdrew								Withdrew					
(Qatar) 1988	Did not enter								Did not enter					
(Japan) 1992	Did not enter								Did not enter					
(United Arab Emirates) 1996	Did not enter								Did not enter					
(Lebanon) 2000	Did not qualify								3	0	0	3	0	11
(China) 2004	Did not qualify								2	0	1	1	1	6
(Indonesia) (Malaysia) (Thailand) (Vietnam) 2007	Did not enter								Did not enter					
(Qatar) 2011	Did not qualify								AFC Challenge Cup					
(Australia) 2015	Withdrew								Withdrew					
(United Arab Emirates) 2019	Did not qualify								2	1	0	1	1	2
(Qatar) 2023	Did not qualify								2	1	0	1	2	3
(Saudi Arabia) 2027	Did not qualify								10	3	0	7	7	34
Total	–	0/18	−	−	−	−	−	−	25	4	1	20	11	102

=== Asian Games ===
Asian Games Record
Year	Result	M	W	D	L	GF	GA
1951–1998	Did not enter						
2002–present	See Brunei national under-23 football team						
Total	0/13	—					

=== AFC Challenge Cup ===
AFC Challenge Cup
Year	Round	GP	W	D	L	GF	GA
(Bangladesh) 2006	Group stage	3	1	1	1	2	2
(India) 2008	Did not qualify						
(Sri Lanka) 2010	Did not qualify						
(Nepal) 2012	Suspended						
(Maldives) 2014	Withdrew						
Total	Best: Group stage	3	1	1	1	2	2

=== AFC Solidarity Cup ===
AFC Solidarity Cup
Year	Result	GP	W	D	L	GF	GA
(Malaysia) 2016	Fourth place	4	1	1	2	7	7
Total	Best: Fourth place	4	1	1	2	7	7

=== ASEAN Championship ===
This competition was formerly known as the Tiger Cup and afterwards the AFF Championship

ASEAN Championship record									Qualification record					
Year	Round	Position	Pld	W	D	L	GF	GA	Pld	W	D	L	GF	GA
(Singapore) 1996	Group stage	8th	4	1	0	3	1	15	No qualification					
(Vietnam) 1998	Did not qualify								2	0	0	2	2	6
(Thailand) 2000	Withdrew								Withdrew					
(Indonesia) (Singapore) 2002	Did not enter								Did not enter					
(Malaysia) (Vietnam) 2004	Did not enter								Did not enter					
(Singapore) (Thailand) 2007	Did not qualify								4	1	1	2	6	11
(Indonesia) (Thailand) 2008	Did not qualify								4	1	1	2	8	7
(Indonesia) (Vietnam) 2010	Suspended								Suspended					
(Malaysia) (Thailand) 2012	Did not qualify								4	2	0	2	6	7
(Singapore) (Vietnam) 2014	Did not qualify								4	0	0	4	5	12
(Myanmar) (Philippines) 2016	Did not qualify								3	1	0	2	5	8
(ASEAN) 2018	Did not qualify								2	1	0	1	2	3
(Singapore) 2020	Withdrew								Withdrew					
(ASEAN) 2022	Group stage	10th	4	0	0	4	2	22	2	1	0	1	6	3
(ASEAN) 2024	Did not qualify								2	0	1	1	0	1
(ASEAN) 2026	Did not qualify								2	0	0	2	1	6
Total	Group stage	2/16	8	1	0	7	3	37	30	7	3	20	41	67

=== FIFA ASEAN Challenge Cup ===
FIFA ASEAN Challenge Cup record
Year	Round	GP	W	D	L	GF	GA
(Hong Kong) 2026	Group Stage	2	0	0	2	1	5
Total	Best: Group stage	2	0	0	2	1	5

== Head-to-head record ==
Team	Pld	W	D	L	GF	GA	GD	WPCT
Bermuda	1	0	0	1	0	2	−2	0.00
Bhutan	5	1	2	2	5	6	−1	20.00
Cambodia	9	1	2	6	10	27	−17	11.11
China	3	0	0	3	1	22	−21	0.00
Chinese Taipei	3	1	0	2	1	7	−6	33.33
Timor-Leste	13	7	1	5	25	19	+6	53.85
Hong Kong	6	0	0	6	1	30	−29	0.00
India	2	0	0	2	0	6	−6	0.00
Indonesia	13	2	2	9	6	52	−46	15.38
Japan	3	0	0	3	2	18	−16	0.00
Laos	13	1	0	12	19	38	−19	7.69
Lebanon	3	0	0	3	0	11	−11	0.00
Macau	6	2	1	3	6	6	0	33.33
Malaysia	11	0	0	11	3	48	−45	0.00
Maldives	2	0	1	1	1	4	−3	0.00
Mongolia	2	1	0	1	2	3	−1	50.00
Myanmar (Note: Includes results as Burma.)	8	1	0	7	5	28	−23	12.50
Nepal	2	1	0	1	2	4	−2	50.00
Pakistan	1	0	0	1	0	6	−6	0.00
Philippines	14	5	2	7	15	20	−5	35.71
Russia	1	0	0	1	0	11	−11	0.00
Singapore	13	0	1	12	5	44	−39	0.00
South Korea	2	0	0	2	1	7	−6	0.00
Sri Lanka	6	3	0	3	4	7	−3	50.00
Tajikistan	1	0	0	1	0	4	−4	0.00
Thailand	8	0	0	8	4	43	−39	0.00
United Arab Emirates	2	0	0	2	0	16	−16	0.00
Vanuatu	1	1	0	0	3	2	+1	100.00
Yemen	4	0	0	4	0	17	−17	0.00
Total	158	27	12	119	121	508	−387	17.09

Source: Results

== Honours ==
=== Friendly ===
- Borneo Cup (3): 1968, 1981, 1987

=== Awards ===
- ASEAN Championship Fair Play Award (1): 1996
