= Health in Brunei =

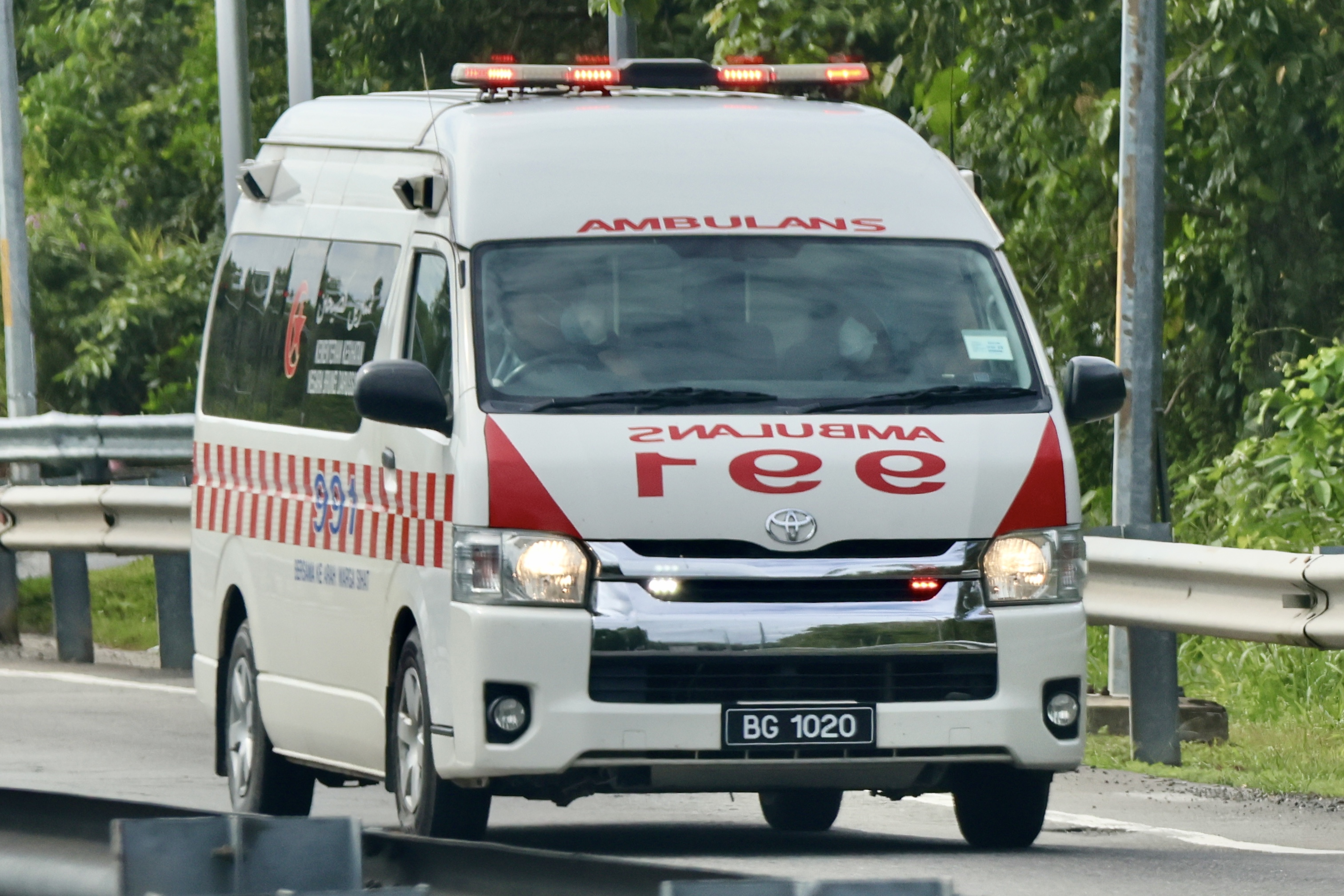
Ambulance responding to an emergency in 2023.

Brunei's healthcare system is managed by the Brunei Ministry of Health and funded by the General Treasury. It consists of around 15 health centers, ten clinics and 22 maternal facilities, considered to be of reasonable standard. There are also two private hospitals. Cardiovascular disease, cancer, and diabetes are the leading cause of death in the country, with life expectancy around 75 years, a vast improvement from 1961. Brunei's human development index (HDI) improved from 0.81 in 2002 to 0.83 in 2021, expanding at an average annual rate of 0.14%. According to the UN's Human Development Report 2020, the HDI for girls in the country is greater than for boys, though there are not enough statistics in Brunei to break down HDI by socioeconomic classes. Brunei is the second country in Southeast Asia after Singapore to be rated 47th out of 189 nations on the UN HDI 2019 and has maintained its position in the Very High Human Development category. Being a culturally taboo subject, the rate of suicide has not been investigated.

== Mortality rates ==
Brunei's adult mortality rate in 2020 was 38.33 deaths for per 100 people. Brunei's adult mortality rate rose at an average yearly rate of 2.86% from 30.04 deaths per 100 inhabitants in 1975 to 38.33 deaths per 100 inhabitants in 2020. The death rate grew by 0.1 fatalities per 1,000 people (+2.07 percent) as of 2020. The death rate thus reached its peak during the observed period at 4.97 deaths per 1,000 people. Notably, the death rate has been rising over the past few years. The annual number of deaths in a particular population expressed as a percentage of 1,000 persons is known as the crude death rate. The rate of natural increase can be calculated when combined with the crude birth rate.

The disability-adjusted life years (DALYs) for 2016 are shown in the following figure. These DALYs combine the years of healthy life lost due to disability (YLD) and years of life lost due to early mortality (YLL). In 2016, Brunei had an overall disease burden of 87.5 DALYs per 1000 people, of which 58% were caused by premature mortality and 42% by non-fatal health effects. 80% of the illnesses burden was attributable to non-communicable diseases, which is close to the percentage in high-income nations (85%). The most prevalent NCDs (15) were cancer (12.6%) and cardiovascular disorders (20.4%).

== Life expectancy at birth ==
Brunei has a 76-year life expectancy at birth in 2020, compared to 63.13 years in 1971, expanding at an average annual rate of 0.38%. The life expectancy at birth in 2020 was around 77.26 years for women and approximately 74.86 years for men. According to data from 2021, life expectancy at birth was 74.640 years. From the prior figure of 74.790 Year for 2020, this shows a drop. From December 1990 to December 2021, there were 32 observations, and the Life Expectancy at Birth data was updated yearly. The data peaked in 2011 at 74.860 Year and fell to a record low in 1990 at 71.660 Year.

== Death rate ==
2019 saw a 9.0% rise in deaths overall 1,757 compared to 2018 of 1,612. The percentage of deaths contributing to the top causes of death in 2019 is shown in the graph below. Heart disease (15.7%), cerebrovascular disorders (9.2%), diabetes mellitus (9.8%), and cancer (19%) were the top killers in Brunei. More than 50% of all deaths were caused by four non-communicable diseases (NCDs).

=== COVID-19 deaths ===
Brunei reported a total of 143 COVID-19-related deaths as of 27 November 2022. In the last two weeks, Brunei recorded 9,060 new COVID-19 cases, a 16% rise from the preceding 14 days. has five patients who are currently receiving care in the intensive care unit (ICU), with a 5.8% ICU usage rate. Six further COVID-19 deaths have been reported in the last 14 days. In the two weeks prior, there was one death reported. The fatality rate for all cases is 0.05%.

== Child health ==
Brunei has seen an increase in the number of cases referred to the Child Development Centre (CDC) over the past ten years, from 2010 (400 cases) to 2020 (766 cases), as of 14 March 2021. In contrast, there were 218 cases of autism documented in 2020 as opposed to 36 in 2011. Early in March of that year, the CDC identified 38 new instances of autism.

== Maternal health ==
The maternal mortality ratio measures how many women per 100,000 live births pass away from pregnancy-related reasons while they are pregnant or within 42 days following delivery. Utilizing data on the ratio of maternal fatalities among non-AIDS deaths among women aged 15 to 49, fertility, birth attendants, and good documentation practice, the statistics are evaluated using a regression model.

== Epidemiology ==
As of 2019, there were 8,290 occurrences of gastroenteritis, followed by 4,261 cases of chickenpox. Gastroenteritis is highly contagious, and since September 2014, authorities have become more alert of an outbreak of viral gastroenteritis. Notifiable sexually transmitted infection (STI) cases have dropped from 454 cases in 2017 to 391 cases in 2018 and then to 221 cases in 2019; these figures come from the Ministry of Health and are not publicly available.

=== Non-communicable diseases ===
Non-communicable diseases (NCD), such as cardiovascular diseases and diabetes, are the leading cause of death in the country. The overall life expectancy for Bruneians in 2018 was 75 years, which was a 20-year increase from 1961. Brunei has made very modest progress. 15.2% of adult men and 18.2% of adult women who are at least 18 years old are obese. The obesity prevalence in the country is greater than the regional average, which is 10.3% for women and 7.5% for men. When looking at adult women (9.9% afflicted), the nation is on course to meet the target for diabetes, but when looking at adult men (9.9% affected), they are off course to meet the target.

At 7.5% of the population, Brunei has the highest obesity prevalence rate in ASEAN countries and one of the highest obesity rates in Asia. Studies conducted by the Ministry of Health (Brunei) found that around 30% of school-aged children in Brunei are overweight, and 20% are obese. Diabetes is the third-highest cause of death in Brunei after cancer and heart disease. The global obesity epidemic is becoming worse and could soon overtake HIV/AIDS as the most prevalent non-communicable disease. From 12% in 1997 to 27.2% in 2011, the Ministry of Health National Hospitals in Brunei have shown a sharp increase in the prevalence of obesity. Despite this, they established the RIPAS Hospital's Obesity Clinic in 2006 with the goal of offering a thorough, all-encompassing, interdisciplinary approach to weight management, nutrition, and metabolism that promotes both good mental and physical health.

In 2019, trachea, bronchus, and lung cancer, rectum and anus cancers, liver and intrahepatic bile duct cancers, prostate cancers, and non-Hodgkin's lymphoma were the top five causes of cancer mortality in men. Breast cancer, rectum and anus cancer, liver and intrahepatic bile duct cancer, trachea, bronchus, and lung cancer, as well as cervix uteri cancer, were the top five causes of cancer fatalities in females.

== Healthcare ==
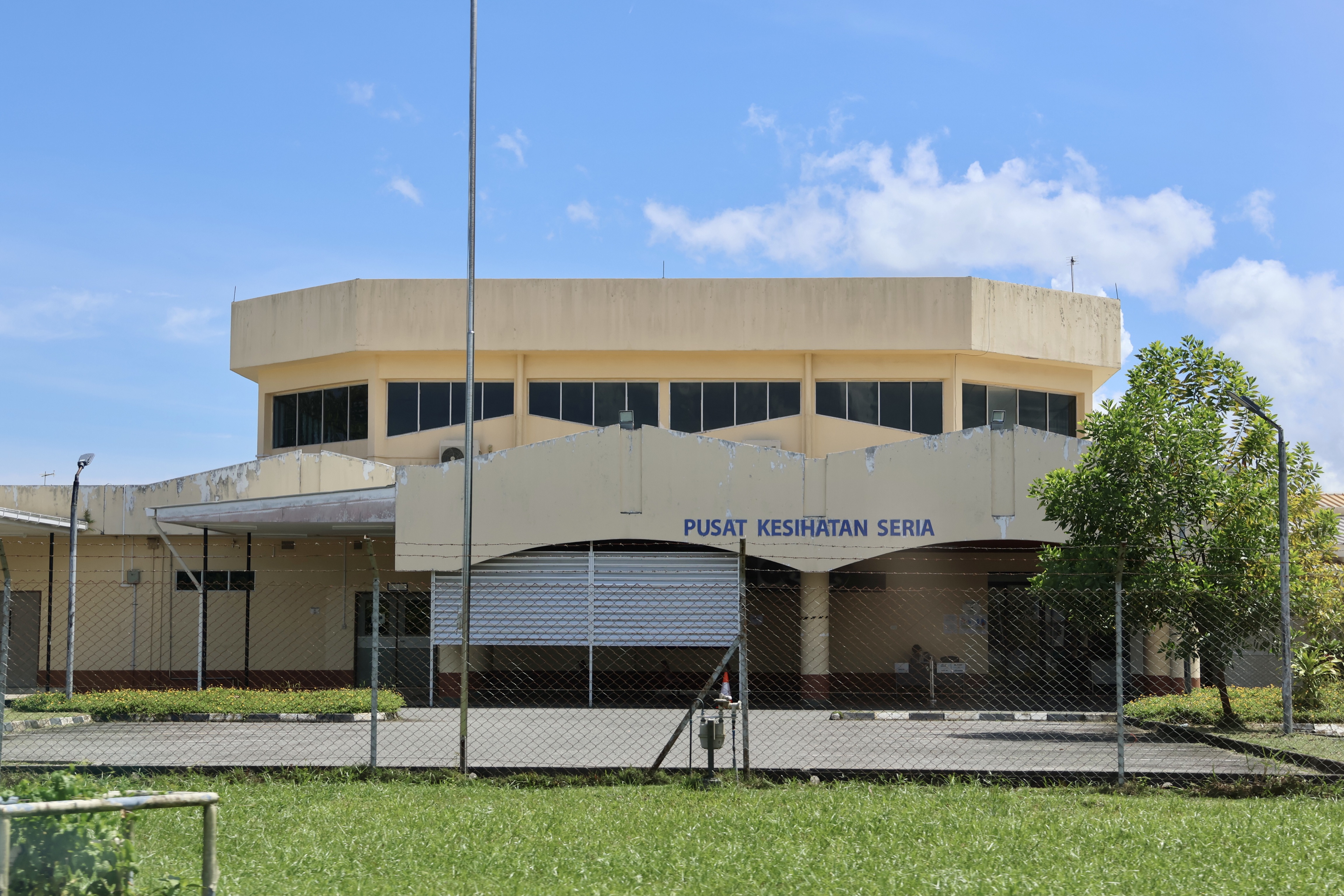
Seria Health Centre

There are four government hospitals in Brunei, one in each district. The largest is Raja Isteri Pengiran Anak Saleha Hospital (RIPAS) hospital, which had 1260 beds and has 257 doctors as of 2005 and is situated in the country's capital Bandar Seri Begawan. There are two private medical centers: Gleneagles JPMC Sdn Bhd. and Jerudong Park Medical Centre. As of 2011, the country had a ratio of 2.8 hospital beds per 1000 people. There are also 16 health centers and 10 health clinics, and a health center run by Brunei Shell Petroleum is located in Panaga. The Health Promotion Centre opened in November 2008 and serves to educate the public on the importance of having a healthy lifestyle.

Healthcare in Brunei is charged at B$1 per consultation for citizens and is free for anyone under 12 years old. The government covers the cost of sending citizens overseas to access treatments and facilities not available in the country. In 2011–2012, 327 patients were treated this way in Malaysia and Singapore at a cost of $12 million.

There are currently no medical schools in Brunei. Citizens wanting to study to become doctors must attend university overseas. However, the Institute of Medicines has been introduced at the Universiti Brunei Darussalam, and a new building has been built for the faculty. The construction of the building with research lab facilities was completed in 2009. There has been a School of Nursing since 1951. Fifty-eight nurse managers were appointed in RIPAS to improve service and provide better medical care. In December 2008, the nursing college merged with the Institute of Medicines at the University Brunei Darussalam to produce more nurses and midwives. It is now called the PAPRSB (Pengiran Anak Puteri Rashidah Sa'datul Bolkiah) Institute of Health Sciences.

The country has a low prevalence of HIV/AIDS, recording 0.1% prevalence in the population, and numerous AIDS awareness campaigns are currently being held.

== Vaccination ==
As of 27 November 2022, 78.8% of the populace has completed the third dose of the national COVID-19 vaccination program.

== See also ==
- List of hospitals in Brunei
