= Pengiran Muda Mahkota Pengiran Muda Haji Al-Muhtadee Billah Hospital =

Hospital in Tutong, Brunei

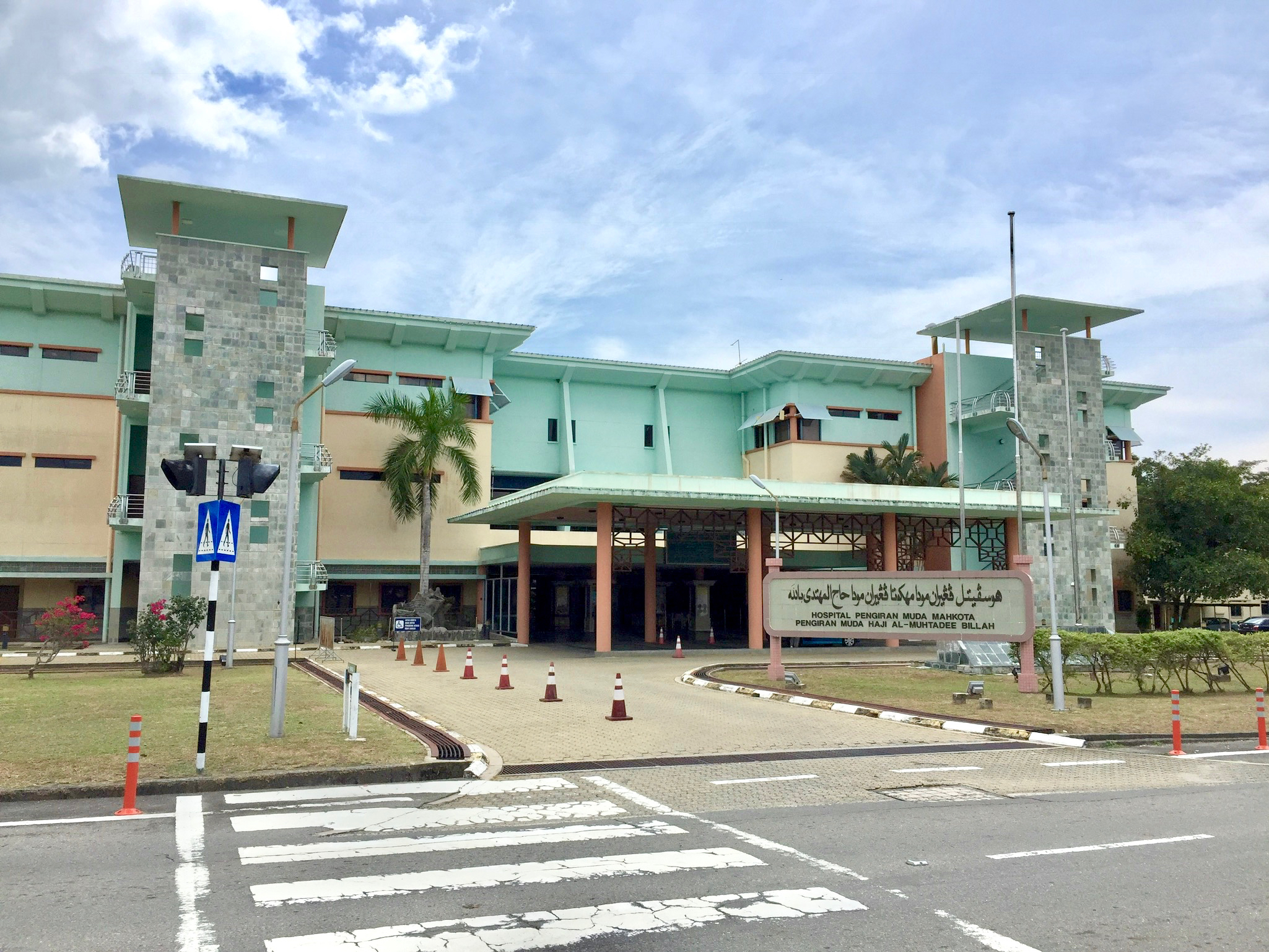
- The hospital in 2018

Geography
- Location: Jalan Sungai Basong, Bukit Bendera, Tutong, Brunei
- Coordinates: 4.817355°N 114.663680°E

Organisation
- Care system: Public
- Type: General
- Religious affiliation: Sunni Islam

Services
- Emergency department: Yes
- Beds: 138

History
- Constructed: 23 April 1994; 32 years ago
- Founded: 24 July 1997; 28 years ago

Links
- Lists: Hospitals in Brunei

Pengiran Muda Mahkota Pengiran Muda Haji Al-Muhtadee Billah Hospital (PMMPMHAMB Hospital; Malay: Hospital Pengiran Muda Mankota Pengiran Muda Haji Al-Muhtadee Billah) is the district hospital serving Tutong District, Brunei. Located in Bukit Bendera, near the district town of Tutong, the hospital was opened in 1997 and has a capacity of 138 beds. Recognised for its role in medical education, the hospital has been accredited as a teaching hospital by Pengiran Anak Puteri Rashidah Sa'adatul Bolkiah Institute of Health Sciences, the medical school under Universiti Brunei Darussalam.

== History ==
Medical and healthcare services in the Tutong District began in 1932 with the establishment of a clinic in a government house at Bukit Bendera, Tutong Town. The clinic, which had six beds, a dispensary, a storeroom, and an outpatient section, initially employed only one medical assistant and one attendant. When village visits started in 1934, additional staff, including dressers, were assigned to the clinic.

During the Japanese occupation of Brunei from 1941 to 1945, part of the clinic, including the dispensary, was severely damaged by bombing. After funding was approved, the clinic was demolished and rebuilt with a wooden structure and stone pillars, using a government class F twin-house design. By 1949, village visit services expanded, and ambulance services were introduced along the Brunei–Muara and Tutong roads. In 1953, a medical officer from Brunei Town (now Bandar Seri Begawan) was assigned to the clinic on a rotating basis, visiting once a week. By 1966, Dr. Singh and his wife were assigned full-time for three years, after which medical officer services were provided bi-weekly.

In 1972, the Tutong District's medical services advanced with the completion of a hospital that had 20 patient beds and provided services such as an operating theatre, delivery room, X-ray, dental unit, outpatient clinic, and laboratory. The maternity and child healthcare clinic, along with the outpatient department, began operations on 11 December 1972. By 1973, work on equipping the outpatient department continued, and the hospital had recorded 11,727 outpatient visits. The development of medical staff was also significant, with two medical doctors and one dentist serving in 1978.

By 1992, the number of doctors at the hospital had increased to four, with two dentists, and by 1996, there were five medical officers. The number of permanent staff also grew year on year, from over 150 in 1978 to 213 in 1992, and 270 by 1996. To replace the old facility, the government of Brunei constructed a new hospital in the Tutong District, named Pengiran Muda Mahkota Pengiran Muda Haji Al-Muhtadee Billah Hospital in honour of Prince Al-Muhtadee Billah's proclamation as crown prince. The hospital is located between Jalan Sungai Basong and Jalan Sungai Besar in Bukit Bendera, Tutong Town, adjacent to the old hospital.

The construction of the new hospital was part of the 6th National Development Plan (RKN 6) from 1991 to 1995, with a B$32 million budget. Its aim was to meet the district's medical needs and provide more comfortable, efficient care for both patients and staff. The foundation stone was laid on 23 April 1994 by Johar Noordin, minister of health, and full construction began in September 1994, completing in September 1996. The key handover ceremony took place on 26 June 1997, with the three-storey hospital began operations on 24 July 1997. The site of the old hospital was transformed into a car park.

The hospital was officially opened on 11 August 1998 as part of the celebrations for the crown prince's proclamation ceremony. Prince Al-Muhtadee Billah officiated at the event, with Prince Mohamed Bolkiah, Prince Sufri Bolkiah, Prince Abdul Azim, and Prince Abdul Malik also in attendance. During the ceremony, Prince Al-Muhtadee Billah planted a tree, signed the opening plaque, and later toured the hospital’s various sections after viewing an exhibition showcasing local developments.

Adjacent to the hospital, the National Isolation Centre was officially opened in the town on 3 December 2012. In order to accommodate COVID-19 patients, the hospital in Tutong temporarily moved and reduced some services starting on 12 March 2020. The tuberculosis, women's, men's, and paediatric wards, along with allied health services and some clinics, were moved to RIPAS Hospital in Bandar Seri Begawan and Suri Seri Begawan Hospital in Belait, while blood sample and specimen services were relocated to the Pekan Tutong Health Centre, and emergency, laboratory, radiology, and pharmacy services remained at the hospital. Later on 14 August 2021, the NIC reached full capacity in just one day.

To celebrate its silver jubilee, the hospital hosted a beach run on 19 November 2023 at Seri Kenangan Beach, with 250 participants across various categories, alongside a family camping event for hospital staff. On 10 August 2024, the Ministry of Health marked the 26th anniversary of the hospital's establishment in Tutong District at the hospital's Surau As-Salam.

== Facilities ==
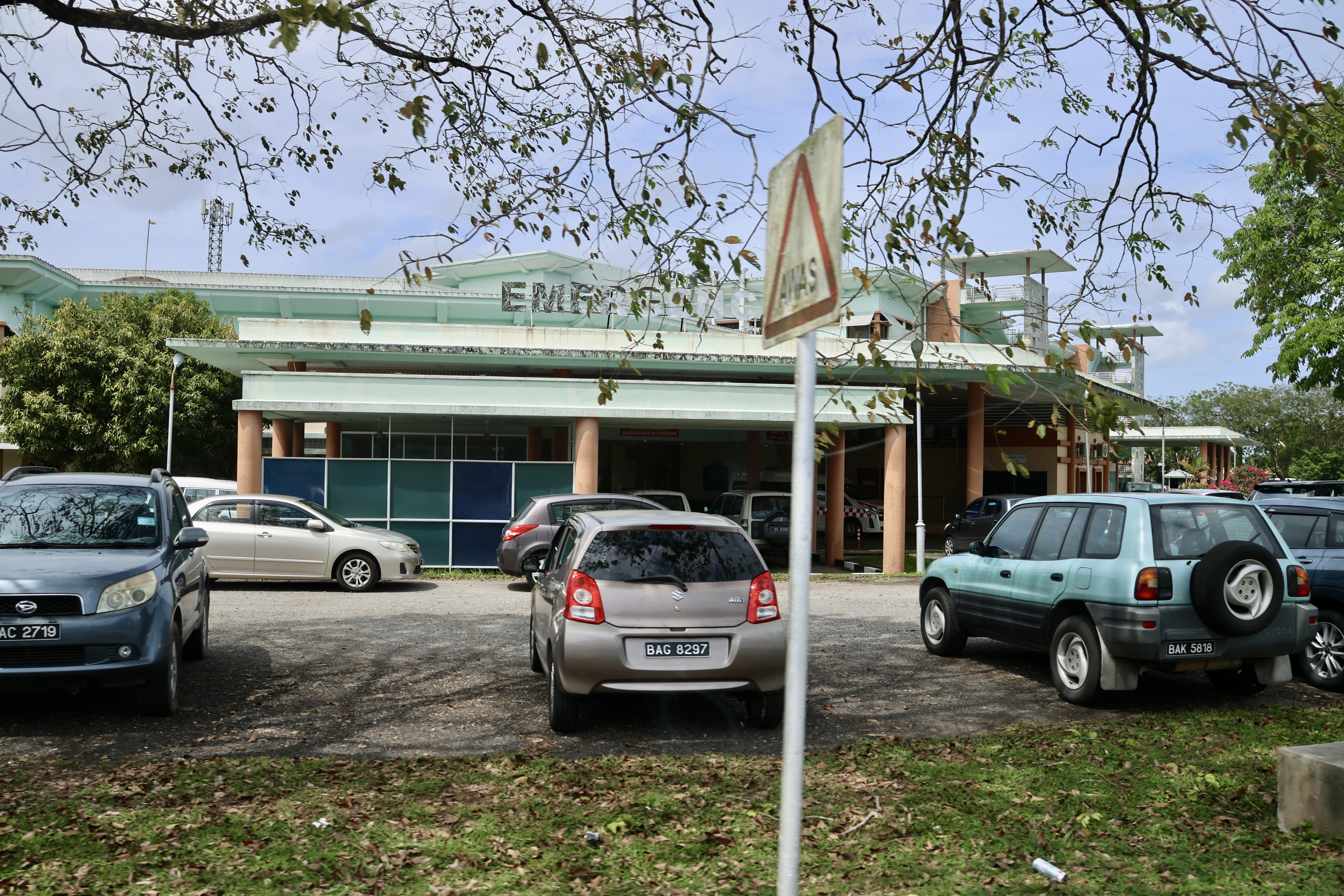
The emergency section in 2024

The hospital has 139 patient beds, distributed across various wards including paediatric, women's medical, men's medical, surgical, maternity, gynaecology, and observation in the accident and emergency department. Additional services include an outpatient clinic, x-ray department, pharmacy, medical laboratory, dental clinic, specialist clinics (such as eye clinic), delivery room, operating theatre, rehabilitation department, medical records department, and occupational therapy department. The administration division manages the coordination of all hospital services and is also responsible for staff matters and hospital correspondence.

In addition to being equipped with the latest modern technology, the hospital has over 16 doctors, including one medical specialist and four senior medical officers, along with skilled staff to ensure high-quality and effective care. These doctors are assigned full-time duties in outpatient services, accident and emergency, internal medicine, obstetrics and gynaecology, pediatrics, and dentistry.

== See also ==
- List of healthcare facilities in Brunei
