= PJSC =

PJSC may refer to:

- Public joint stock company (Russia), a company structure in post-Soviet states
- Joint-stock company, a type of business entity
- Pantai Jerudong Specialist Centre, a specialist hospital in Brunei
