= Seri Begawan =

Seri Begawan may refer to:

- Bandar Seri Begawan, capital of Brunei
- Paduka Seri Begawan Sultan, a title of Omar Ali Saifuddien III, former sultan of Brunei after whom Bandar Seri Begawan was named
- Paduka Seri Begawan Sultan Science College, a school in Brunei
- Seri Begawan Religious Teachers University College, a university in Brunei
- Suri Seri Begawan Hospital, government hospital in Kuala Belait, Belait District, Brunei
