= List of healthcare facilities in Brunei =

This is a list of healthcare facilities in Brunei. This list includes government and private hospitals, as well as community health centres in the country.

Name	Funding	Type	Location	District
Raja Isteri Pengiran Anak Saleha Hospital	Government	General	Bandar Seri Begawan	Brunei-Muara
Suri Seri Begawan Hospital	Government	General	Kuala Belait	Belait
Pengiran Muda Mahkota Pengiran Muda Haji Al-Muhtadee Billah Hospital	Government	General	Tutong	Tutong
Pengiran Isteri Hajjah Mariam Hospital	Government	General	Bangar	Temburong
Pengkalan Batu Health Centre	Government	Health centre	Limau Manis	Brunei-Muara
Silver Jubilee Health Centre	Government	Health centre	Sengkurong	Brunei-Muara
Golden Jubilee Health Centre	Government	Health centre	Bunut	Brunei-Muara
Pengiran Anak Puteri Hajah Rashidah Sa'adatul Bolkiah Health Centre	Government	Health centre	Sungai Kebun	Brunei-Muara
Pengiran Anak Puteri Hajah Muta-Wakillah Hayatul Bolkiah Health Centre	Government	Health centre	Rimba	Brunei-Muara
Berakas Health Centre	Government	Health centre	Lambak Kanan	Brunei-Muara
Muara Health Centre	Government	Health centre	Muara	Brunei-Muara
Kuala Belait Health Centre	Government	Health centre	Kuala Belait	Belait
Seria Health Centre	Government	Health centre	Seria	Belait
Sungai Liang Health Centre	Government	Health centre	Sungai Liang	Belait
Pekan Tutong Health Centre	Government	Health centre	Tutong	Tutong
Telisai Health Centre	Government	Health centre	Telisai	Tutong
Sungai Kelugos Health Centre	Government	Health centre	Sungai Kelugos	Tutong
Lamunin Health Centre	Government	Health centre	Lamunin	Tutong
Bangar Health Centre	Government	Health centre	Bangar	Temburong
Jerudong Park Medical Centre	Private	General	Jerudong	Brunei-Muara
Gleneagles JPMC	Private	Specialist	Jerudong	Brunei-Muara
Pantai Jerudong Specialist Centre	Private	Specialist	Jerudong	Brunei-Muara
Panaga Health Centre	Private	General	Panaga	Belait
