= The Empire Brunei =

Hotel in Jerudong, Brunei

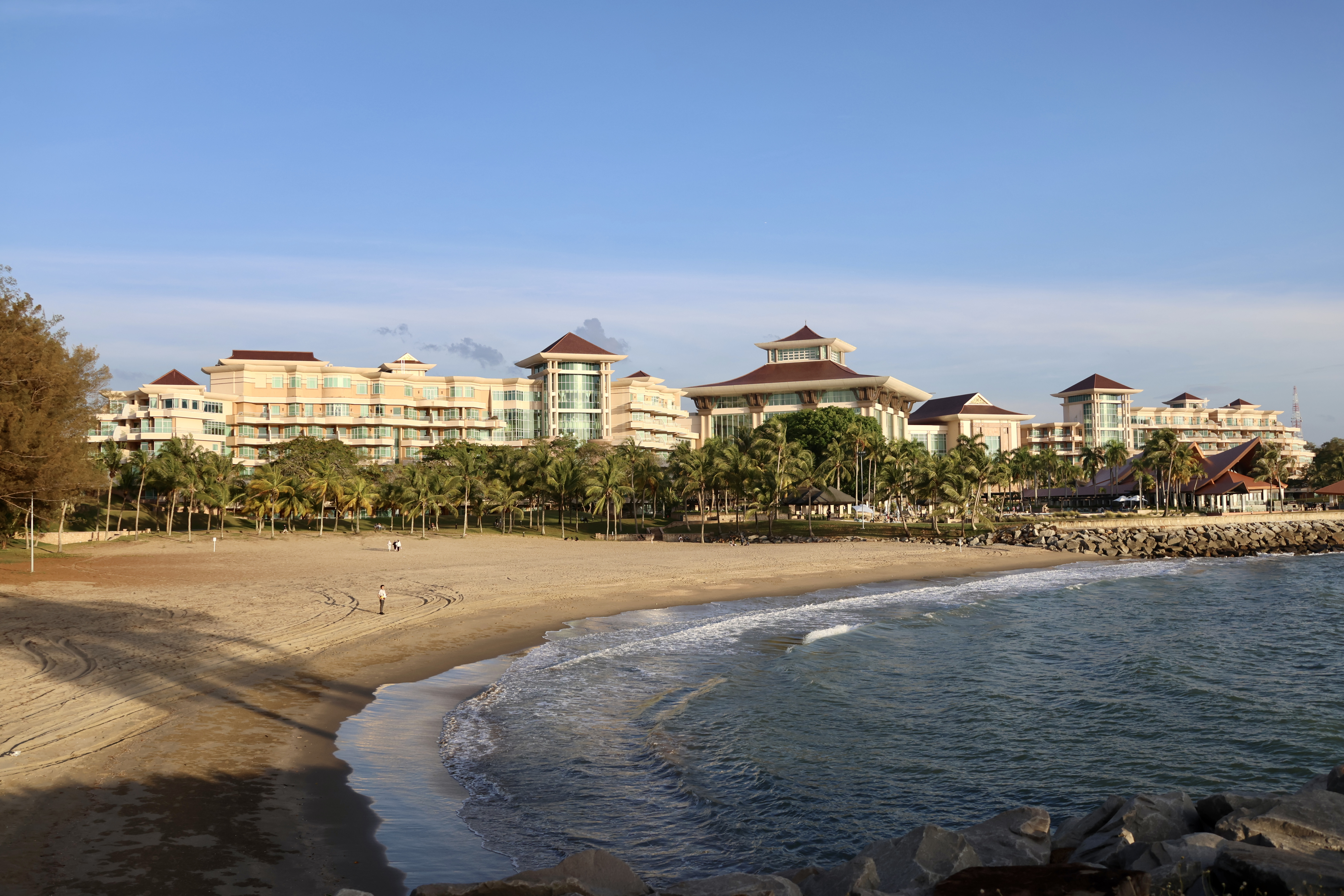
- The Empire Brunei in 2023
- Former names: The Empire Hotel & Country Club

General information
- Status: Completed
- Type: Luxury hotel
- Location: Jerudong, BG3122, Brunei
- Coordinates: 4°58′00″N 114°51′11″E
- Construction started: 1994; 32 years ago
- Completed: 2000; 26 years ago
- Opened: 16 October 2000; 26 years ago
- Cost: US$1.1 billion
- Owner: Brunei Investment Agency

Technical details
- Grounds: 180 hectares (440 acres)

Design and construction
- Architecture firm: McKerrell Lynch
- Other designers: Jack Nicklaus

Other information
- Number of rooms: 532

Website
- theempirebrunei.com

The Empire Brunei is a luxury hotel located in Kampong Jerudong, Brunei, in the Brunei–Muara District. It is near the near the capital, Bandar Seri Begawan. Originally funded by Prince Jefri Bolkiah and completed in 2000, the hotel encountered financial difficulties that resulted in government investment and a transfer of ownership. Relaunched in 2019 with updated branding, the hotel offers a range of accommodations, including the "Emperor Suite". The hotel has won awards, including for its golf course, and has hosted a number of ASEAN events.

== History ==
In the 1990s, Prince Jefri Bolkiah financed the construction of a hotel valued at approximately US$1.1 billion. The financial strain on state resources led the government to invest in what was initially intended as a private enterprise. Construction commenced in 1994 and spanned six years, involving 220 architects and designers from the Australian firm McKerrell Lynch. Initially owned by Amedeo Development Corporation, and led by the Prince, ownership was transferred to the Brunei Investment Agency following Amedeo's collapse in 1998.

The hotel was formerly known as the Jerudong Park Hotel. The Empire Hotel and Country Club, developed over a period of six years with the collaboration of approximately 300 designers, technologists, and artisans, officially opened on 16 October 2000. The opening of the hotel was scheduled to precede the November APEC Brunei Darussalam 2000 meeting, to help address a lack of hotel space in Bandar Seri Begawan.

On 30 October 2019, the hotel was rebranded as The Empire Brunei to mark its 19th anniversary. The rebranding, managed by & SMITH, maintained the original name "The Empire" while adding "Brunei" to emphasise its location. The updated logo incorporates the national flower, bunga simpur, surrounded by lilies and employs a gold and teal colour scheme to represent the sea and woods.

== Design and features ==
The hotel is situated on a 180-hectare (445-acre) beachfront property overlooking the South China Sea. It offers both rooms and conference facilities. It has been considered a "six-star" hotel.

Recreational facilities include an 18-hole Jack Nicklaus–designed golf course, other sports facilities, two private beaches, restaurants, and a three-screen movie theatre. The "Emperor Suite", the hotel's most expensive accommodation, spans 665 or 675 square metres (7,160 or 7,270 sq ft) of the seventh floor, and includes features such as a private dining area, swimming pool, grand piano, sauna, Jacuzzi, private elevator access, and a movie theatre. The suite is often reserved for high-profile guests. Its first guest was United States President Bill Clinton who stayed there during the APEC Brunei Darussalam 2000 meeting. Other former guests include the then-Prince Charles.

The sultan's 1521 welcoming of Ferdinand Magellan and his crew from the Bruneian coast is shown in a mural at the hotel.

== Events ==
The 25th ASEAN Summit was held at the Empire Hotel on 18 March 2015, in the hotel's largest conference room.

A meeting of the ASEAN Socio-Cultural Community was hosted at the hotel by the Ministry of Culture, Youth and Sports from 28 to 29 May 2024. In August 2024 the hotel hosted an ASEAN Cooperation on Civil Service Matters (ACCSM) meeting.

The hotel's golf course hosted the Brunei Open.

== Awards ==
The Empire Hotel has been recognised and awarded the following:

- Brunei's Leading Hotel (2004–2017; 2020–2024)
- Asia Pacific's Best Golf Resort (2010–2011)
- World's Leading Hotel Suite (2003–2005)
- Asia's Leading Golf Resort (2004–2005)
- Asia's Leading Resort (2003–2004)

== Gallery ==
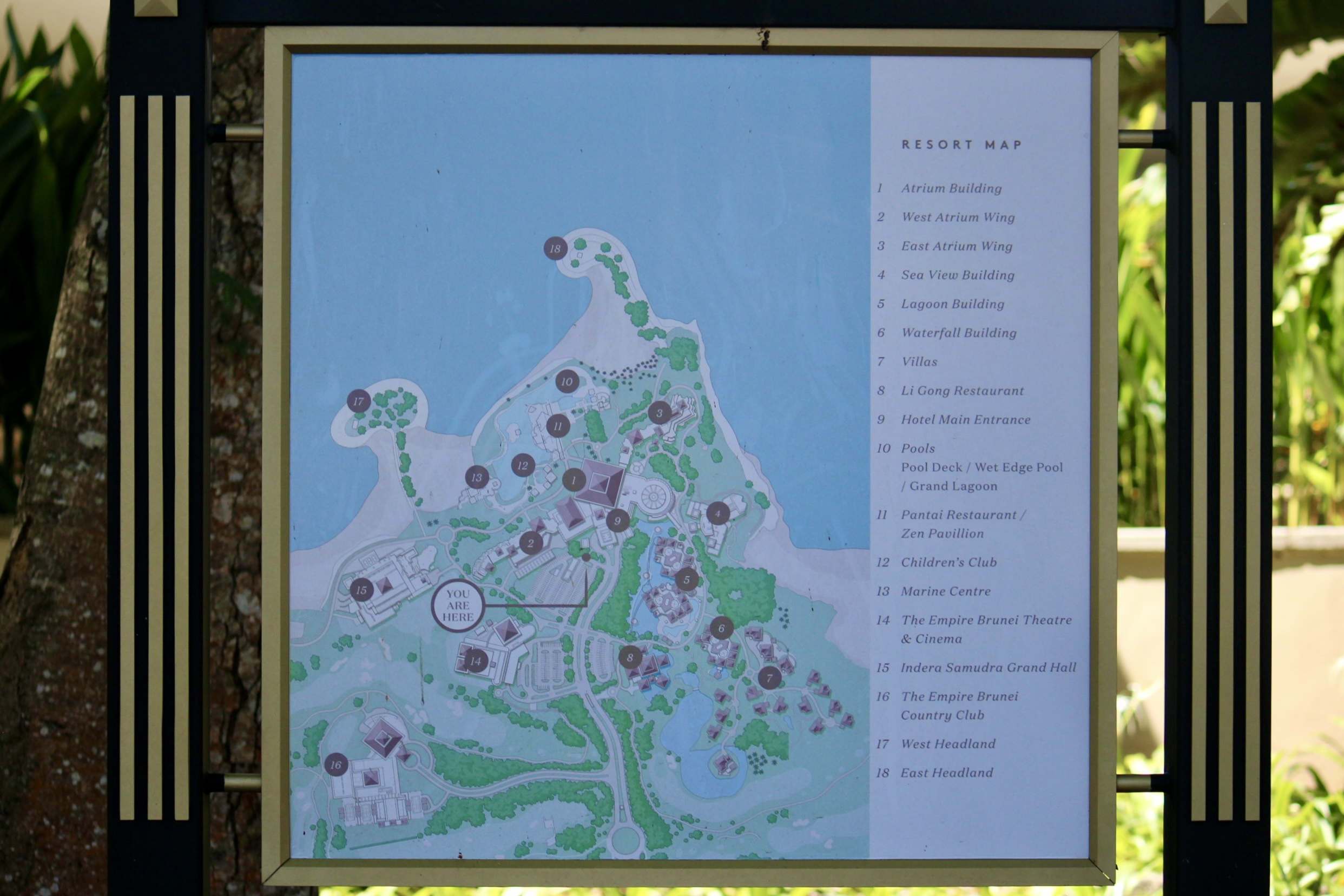
Map of the hotel complex

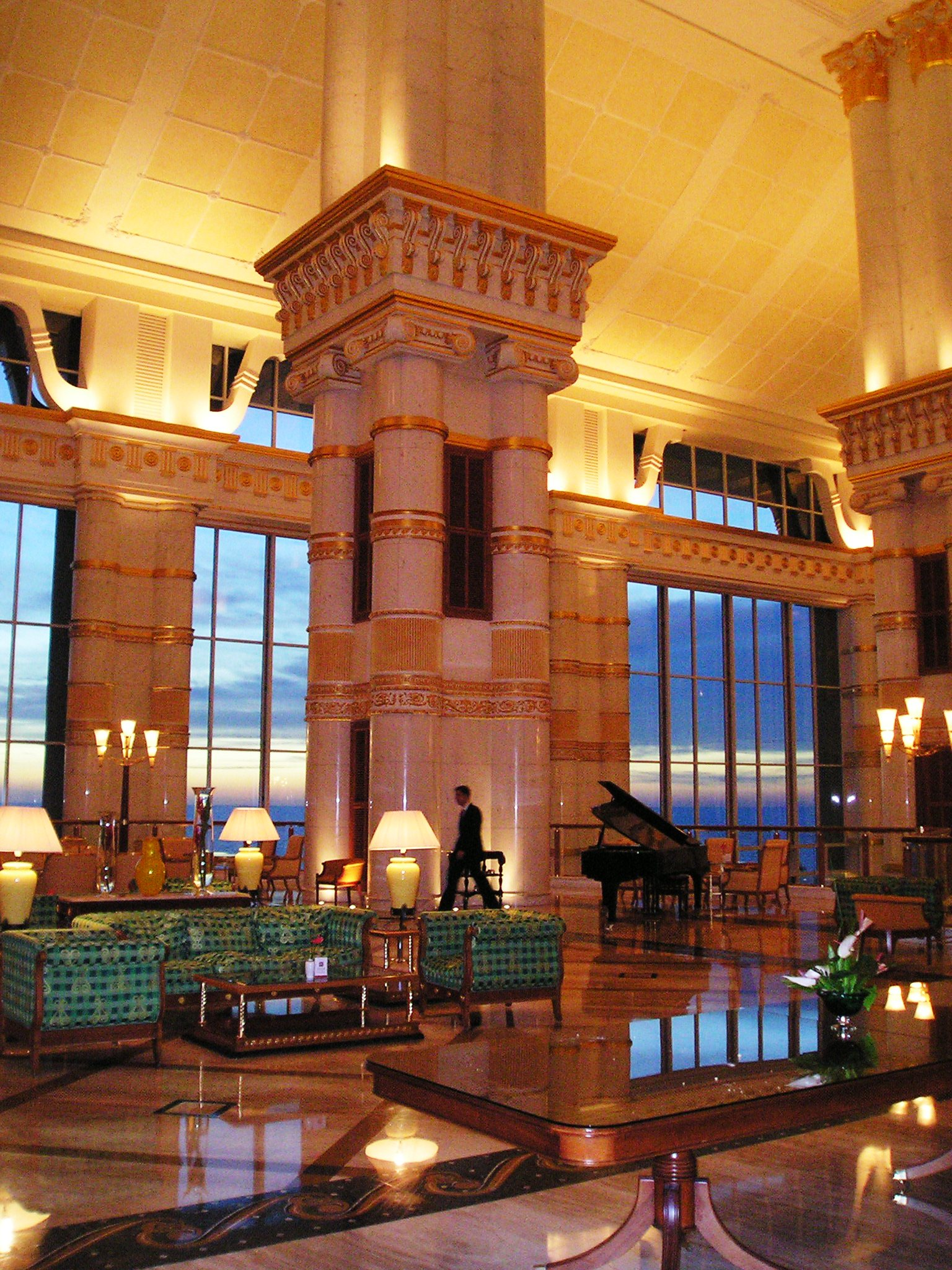
The atrium at dusk

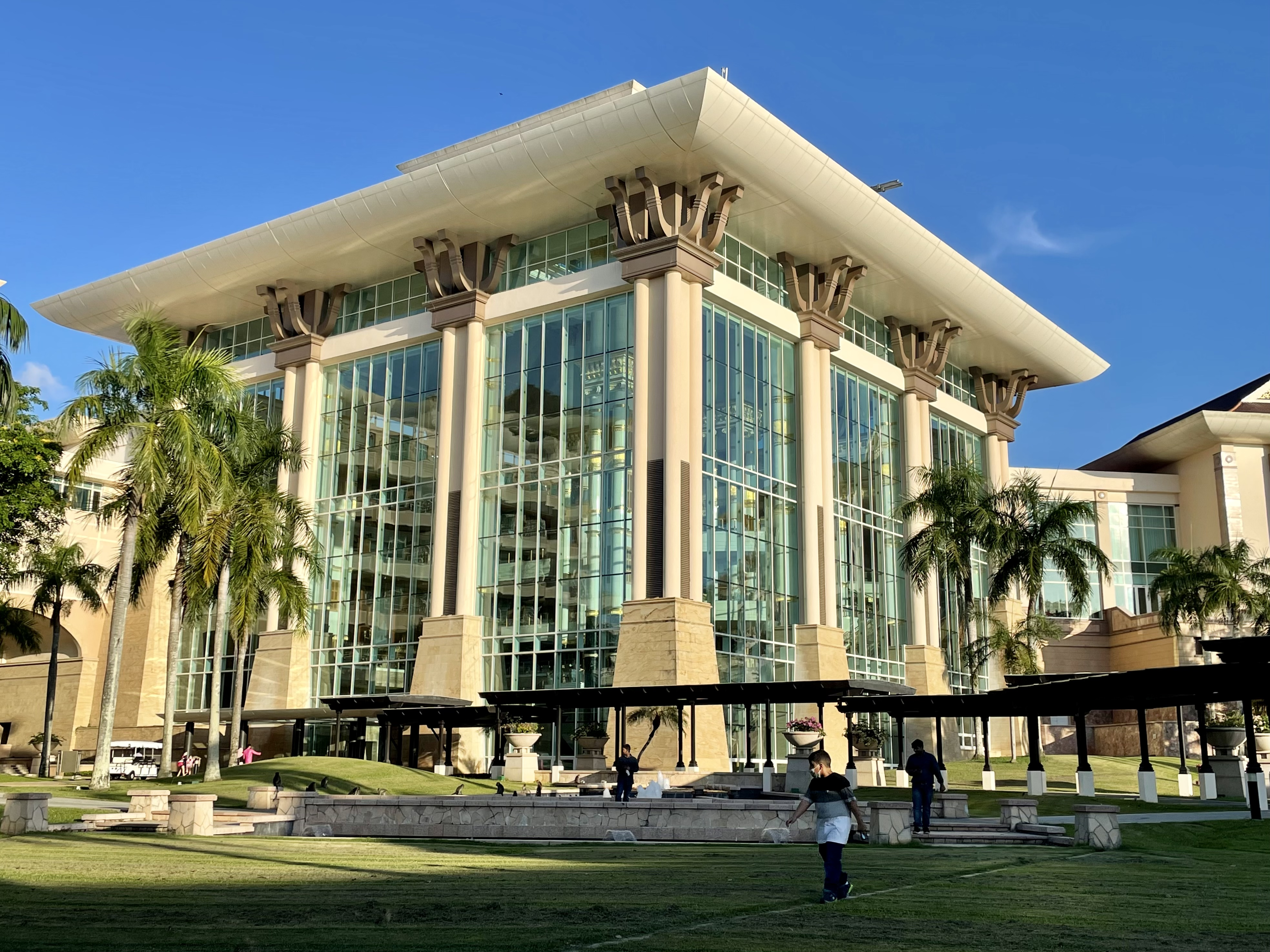
The atrium's exterior

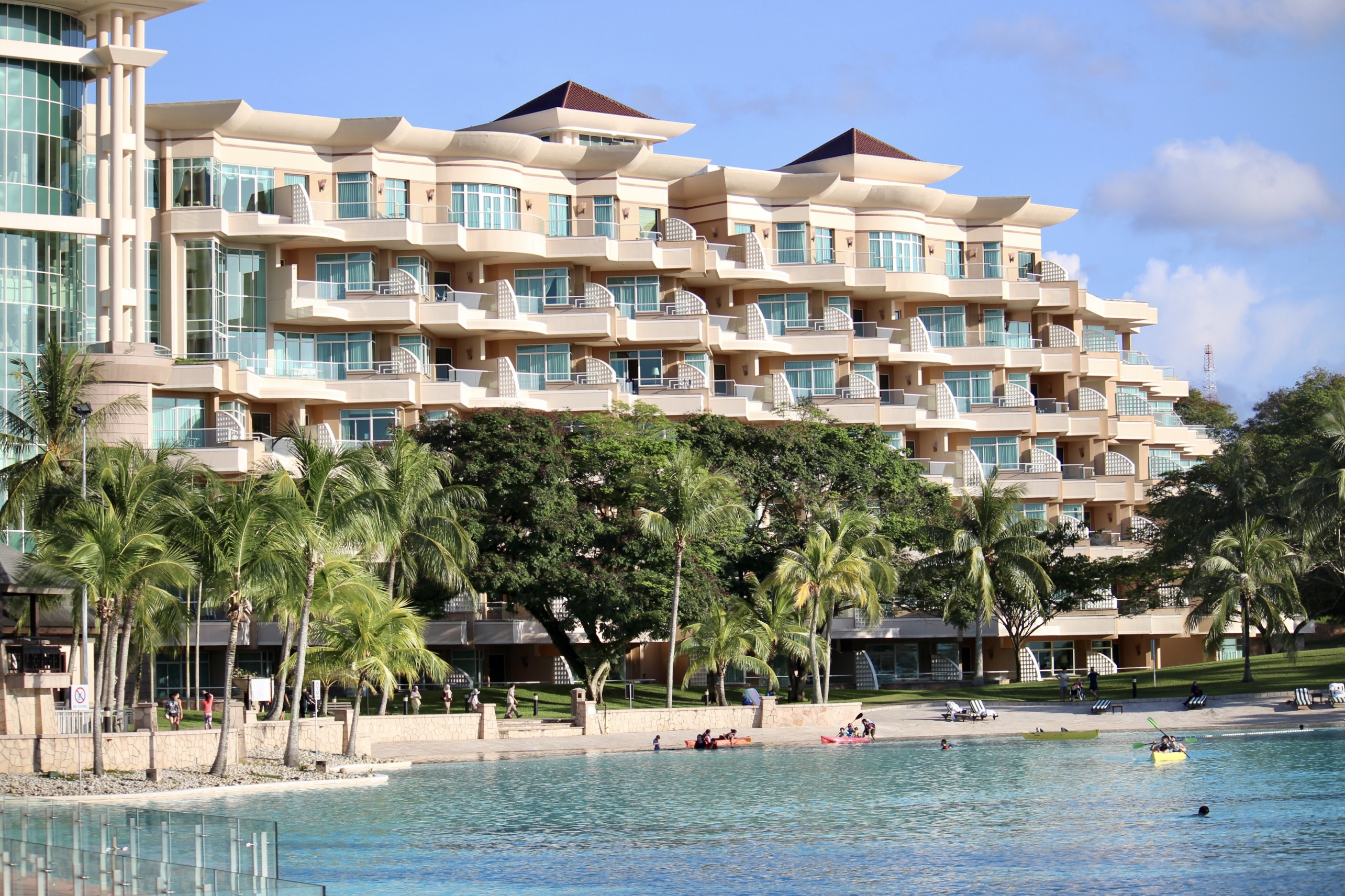
The west atrium wing

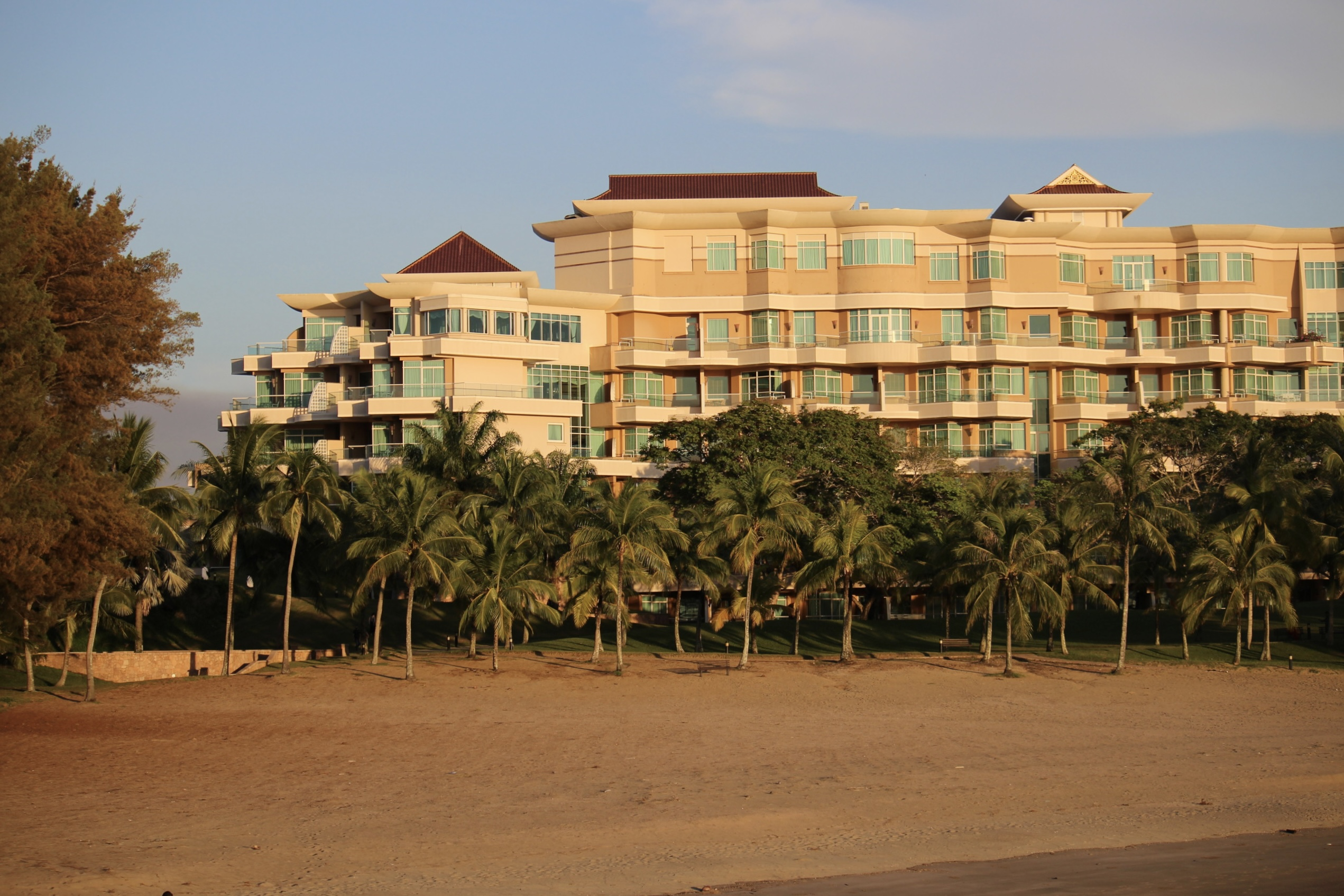
The right atrium wing

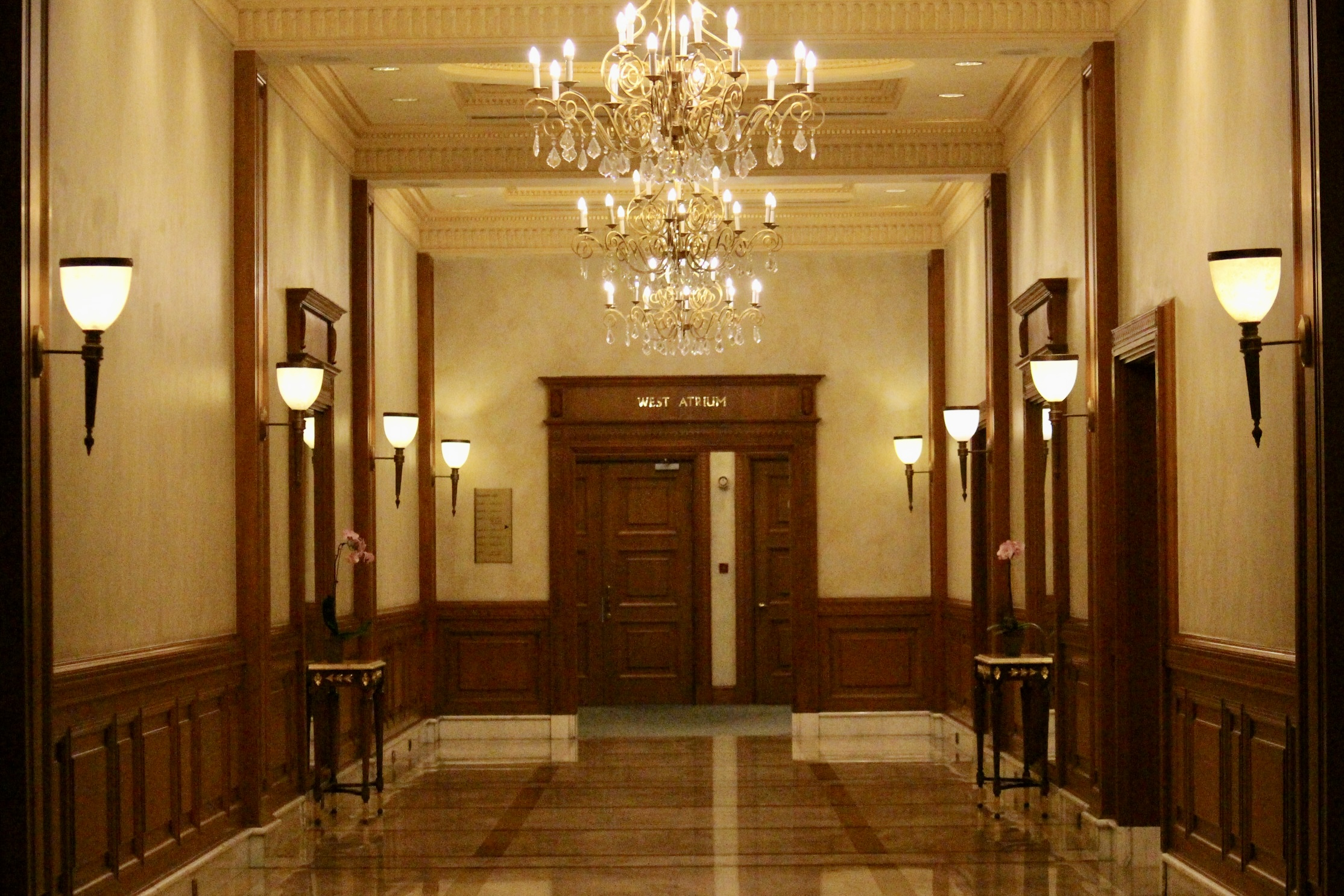
Corridor to the West atrium wing

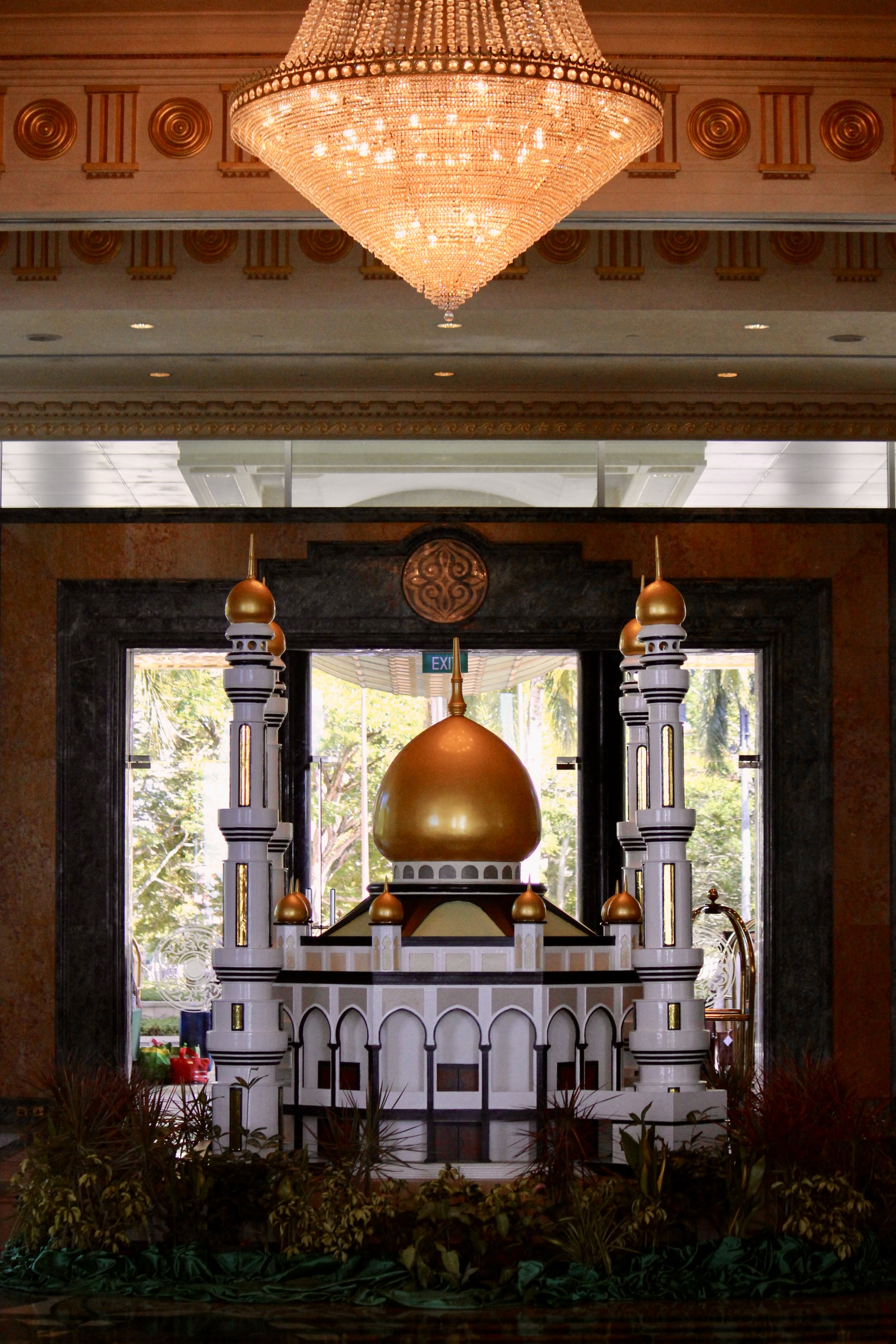
A mosque model in-front of the main entrance

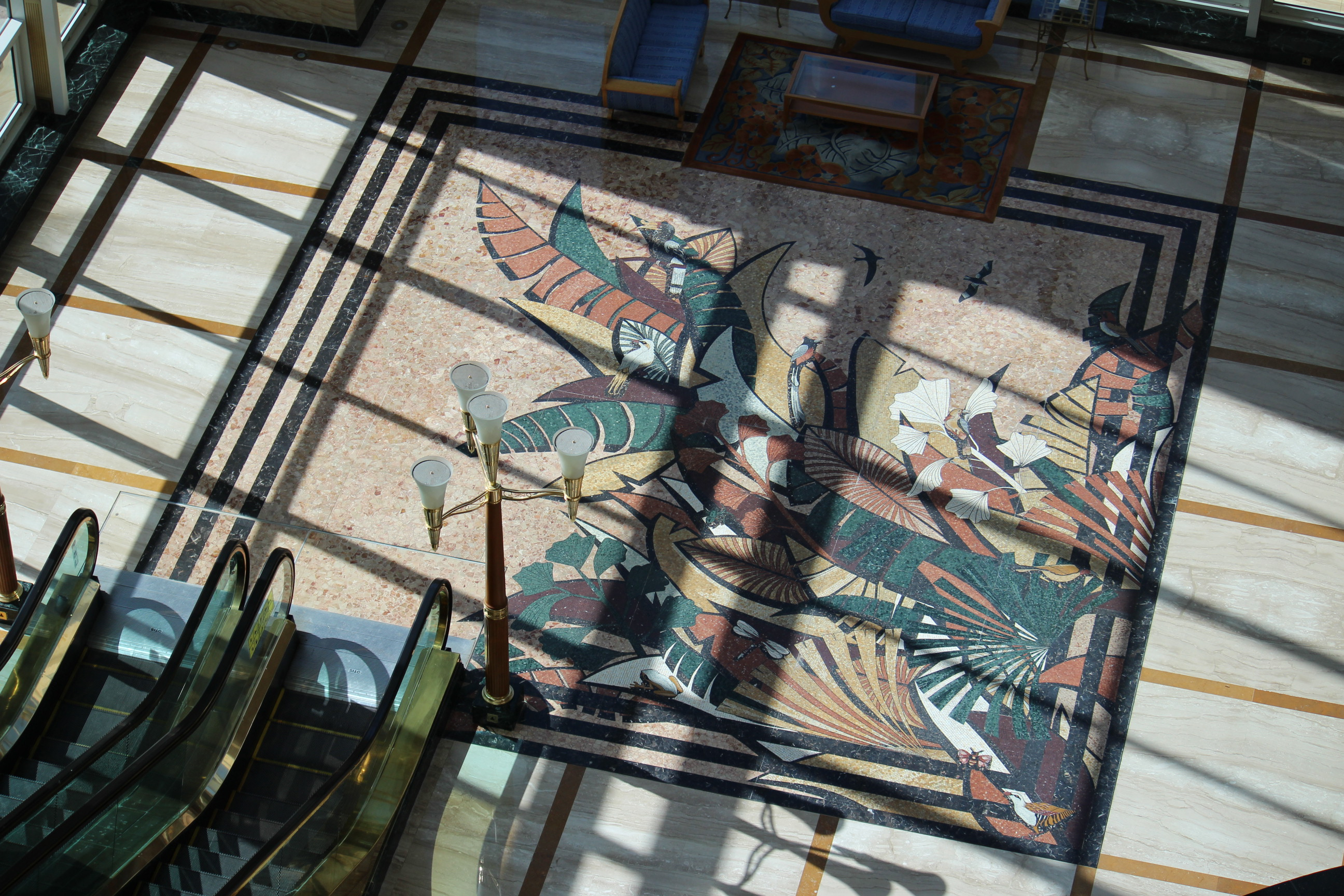
The atrium's mosaic tiles
