= Pantai Jerudong Specialist Centre =

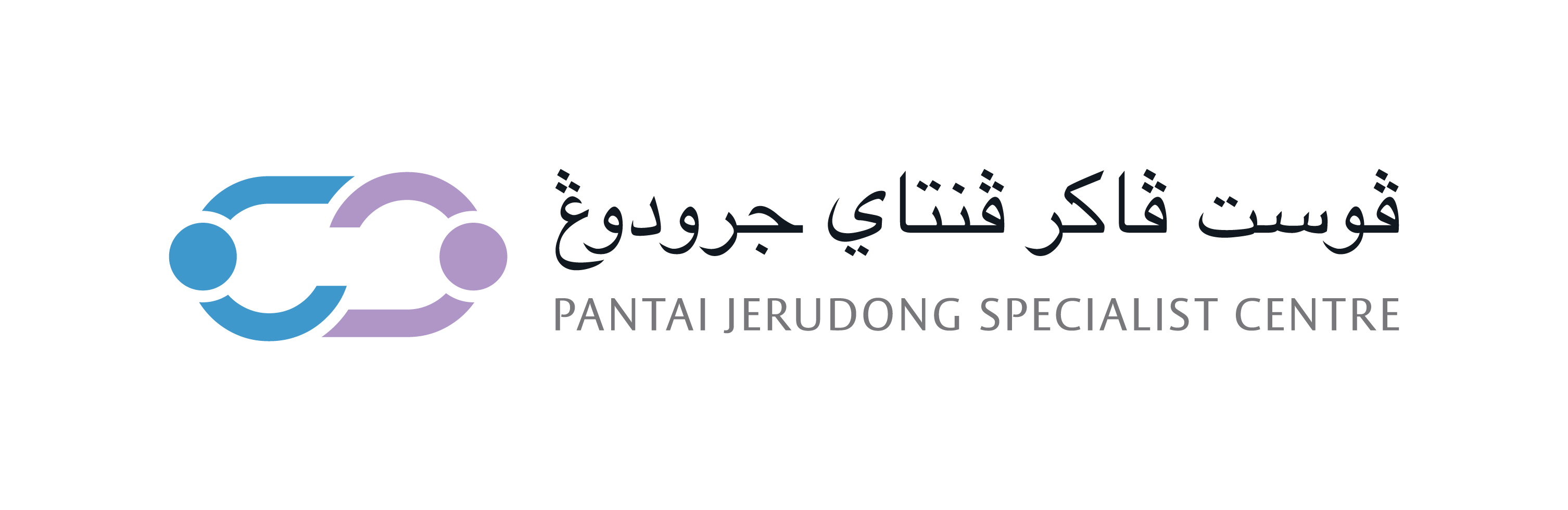

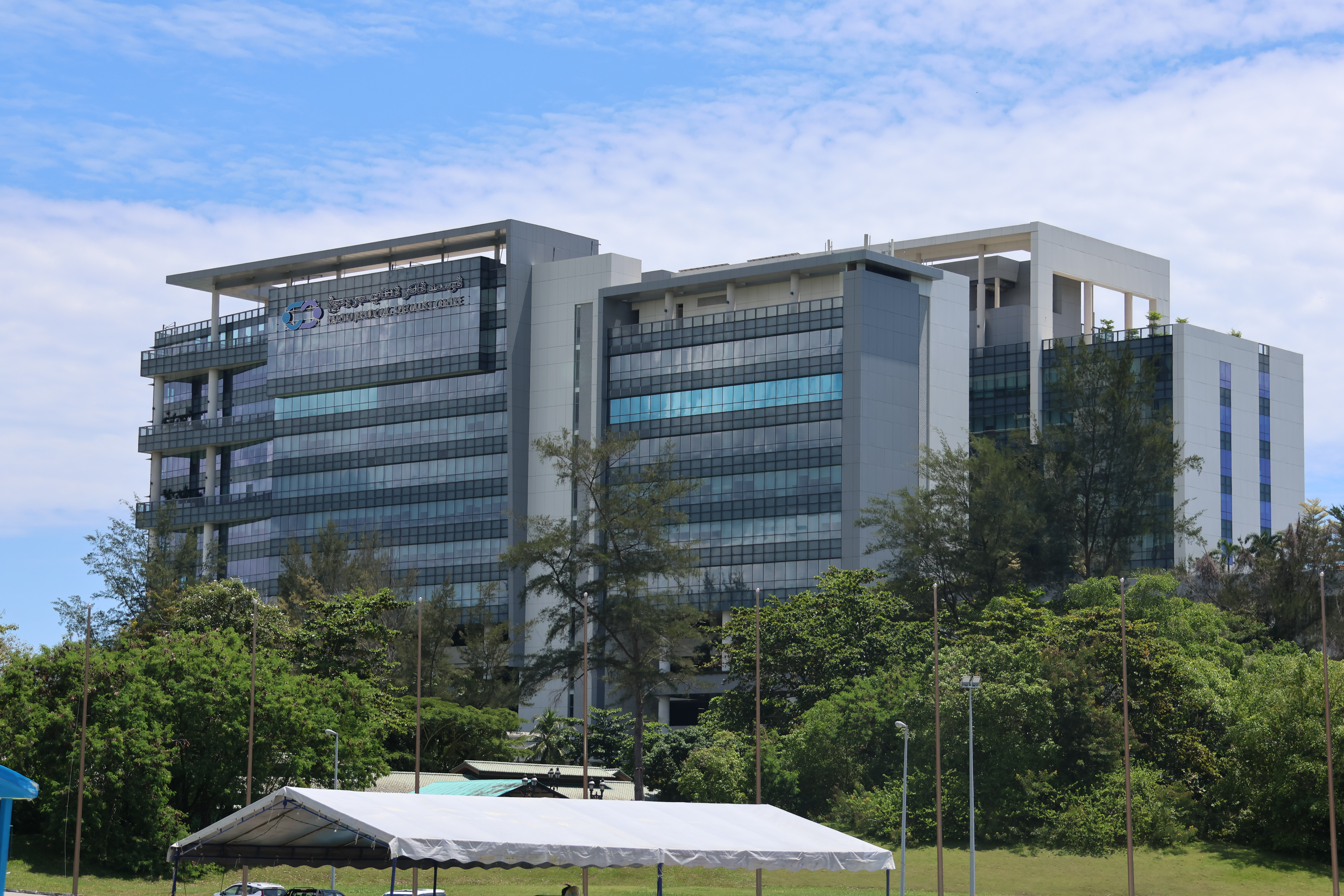
- The hospital in 2023

Geography
- Location: Jerudong, Brunei-Muara, Brunei Darussalam
- Coordinates: 4°57′00″N 114°49′53″E

Organisation
- Care system: private
- Type: specialist
- Affiliated university: Institute of Brunei Technical Education

Pantai Jerudong Specialist Centre (Malay: Pusat Pakar Pantai Jerudong - PJSC), is a private hospital located in Jerudong, Brunei-Muara District, in Brunei Darussalam.

== Location ==
The hospital is located north of Jerudong Park, situated on the right of Jerudong Park Medical Centre. PJSC is also located at the coast overlooking the South China Sea, and the west of the BRIDEX International Conference Centre.

== History ==
It houses The Brunei Cancer Centre (TBCC), a medical centre in the country for treating cancer-related cases, and the Brunei Neuroscience Stroke and Rehabilitation Centre (BNSRC), a medical centre for stroke rehabilitation and other neurological cases. Both centres were completed in 2017.

On 22 June 2019, Institute of Brunei Technical Education (IBTE) signed a Memorandum of Understanding (MoU) with the hospital. Baiduri Bank collaborated with PJSC to host a cancer awareness workshop in the bank's headquarters.

== See also ==
- List of healthcare facilities in Brunei
