= Suri Seri Begawan Hospital =

Hospital in Kuala Belait

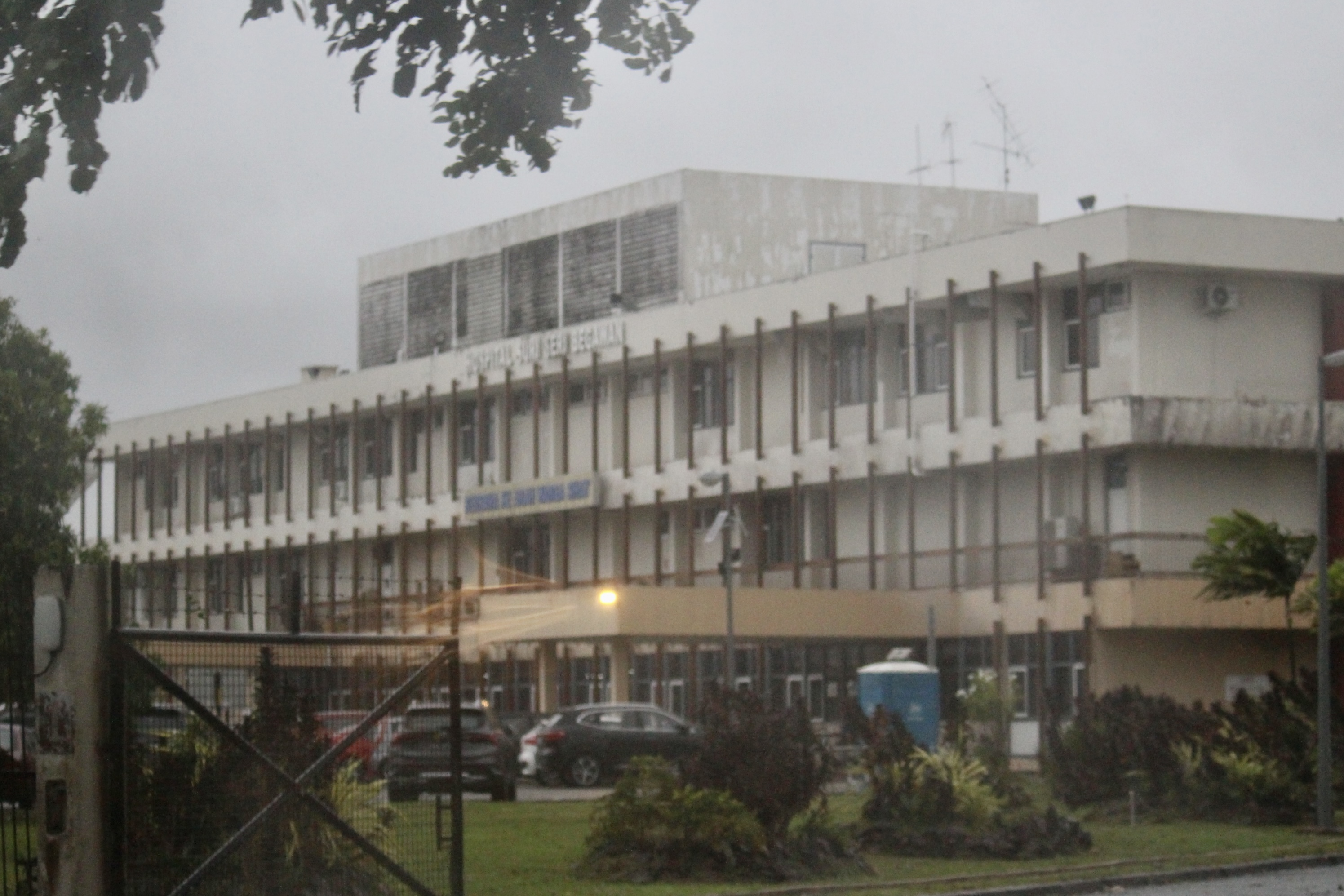
- The hospital in 2022

Geography
- Location: Jalan Bunga Raya, Kuala Belait, Belait, Brunei
- Coordinates: 4°35′00.4″N 114°11′55.6″E

Organisation
- Care system: Public
- Type: General
- Religious affiliation: Sunni Islam

Services
- Emergency department: Yes
- Beds: 222

Helipads
- Helipad: No

History
- Founded: 3 October 1972; 53 years ago

Links
- Lists: Hospitals in Brunei

Suri Seri Begawan Hospital (Note: The hospital is simply referred to as Kuala Belait Hospital.) (SSB Hospital or SSBH; Malay: Hospital Suri Seri Begawan) is a public hospital located in Kuala Belait, the main town of Belait District, Brunei. As the second largest hospital in the country, it offers a range of secondary healthcare services and various medical specialties to meet the healthcare needs of the local population.

== History ==
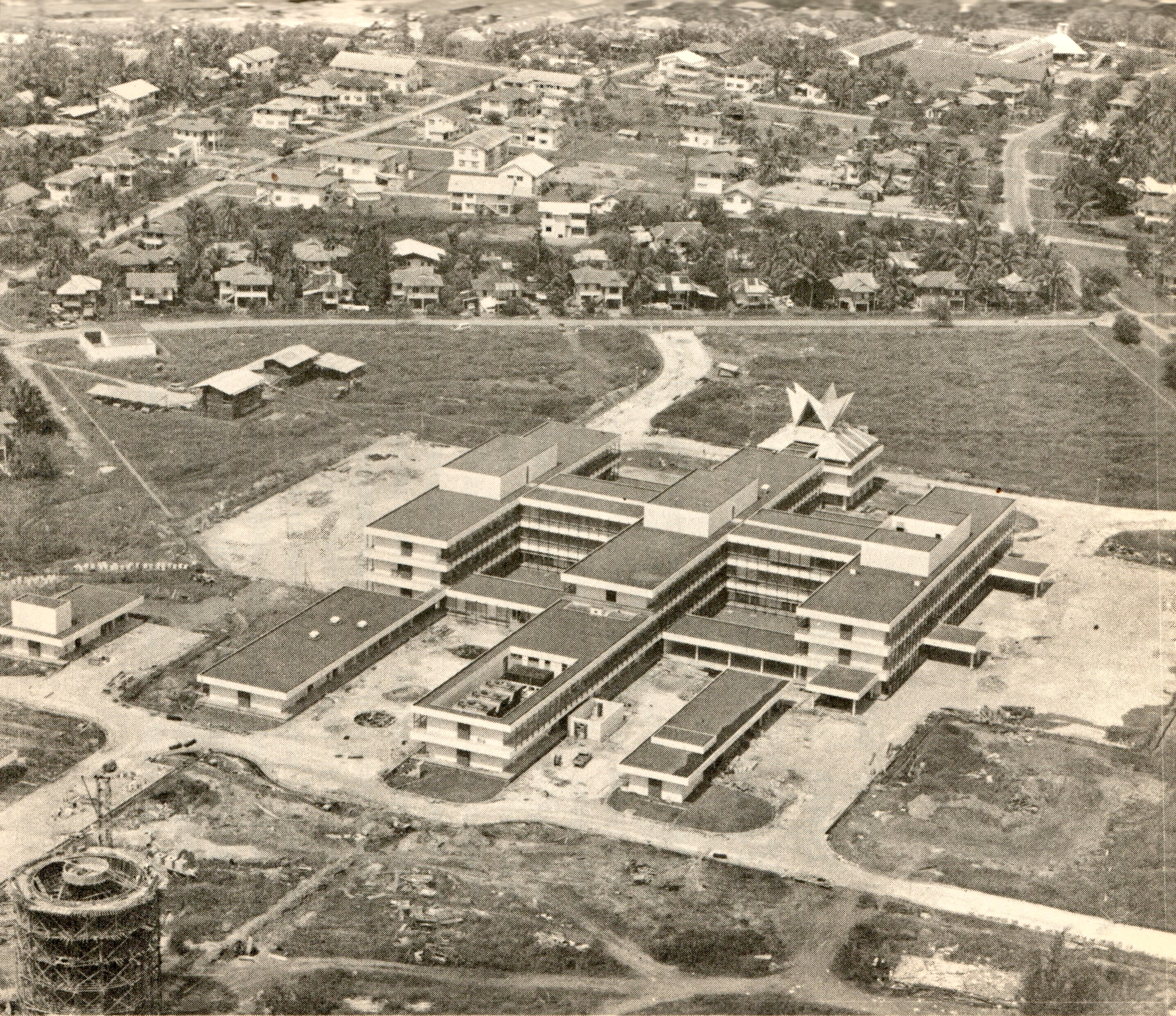
Aerial photograph of SSB Hospital under construction in c. 1972

SSB Hospital was officially opened on 3 October 1972 as Brunei's first dedicated healthcare facility, initially operating with a capacity of 185 beds. Named in honour of Sultan Hassanal Bolkiah's mother, Paduka Seri Suri Begawan Raja Pengiran Anak Damit, the hospital featured modern facilities, including a large operating room complex, two theatre suites, and a casualty theatre, with a dedicated operating room for the Eye Department. By 1977, the hospital had seen an influx of clinical specialists, marking the beginning of its long history of service and expansion to meet the growing healthcare needs of the community.

In 1995, the hospital underwent a major expansion, with the construction of a Rehabilitation Building and a Multi-Purpose Hall, alongside the addition of operating theatres, wards, and clinics. This development was a significant milestone in enhancing both infrastructure and patient care. In 2000, the hospital underwent repairs and renovation. The demand for dialysis services led to the completion of a Dialysis Centre in April 2000, followed by further expansion in 2009. In 2003, the hospital's capacity was further increased with the construction of the Women and Children's block, bringing the total number of beds to 222.

Continuing its development, the Psychiatric Ward was renovated in 2012. The following year, the hospital established a Learning and Development Centre to support medical education and training. In the same year, the implementation of the Brunei Health Information Management System (Bru-HIMS) significantly enhanced the efficiency of medical information management.

In 2020, the hospital expanded its psychiatric services with the official opening of the Day Centre Building for Psychiatric Services. Looking ahead, under the 11th National Development Plan (RKN 11), a new block for the Accident and Emergency Unit is being constructed, which will feature isolation rooms for infectious diseases and HAZMAT incidents. Additionally, the RKN 12 outlines plans for a new Surgical Building and a Rehabilitation Centre for adults and children, ensuring the hospital continues to meet the evolving healthcare needs of Brunei’s population.

The golden jubilee celebration of SSB Hospital, marking five decades of dedicated healthcare services, was led by Minister of Health Isham Jaafar. The event reflected on the hospital's transformation since its establishment, highlighting its current capacity of 222 beds and 621 staff members, alongside significant advancements in infrastructure, medical services, and healthcare delivery. In line with Wawasan Brunei 2035, the minister commended the hospital's progress in expanding clinical and diagnostic services and encouraged continued efforts to enhance healthcare quality. The festivities featured a tribute to blood donors, an awards ceremony recognising outstanding contributions, and the premiere of a staff testimonial video. A cake-cutting ceremony and a tour of service booths concluded the event. Additionally, a series of activities are planned to extend the celebration, including a Family Carnival Day, blood donation campaigns, health screenings, a Khatam Al-Quran ceremony, and a sports competition in 2023.

Minister of Health presided over the opening of a new Potacabin Day Centre for psychiatric patients at the SSB Hospital, which replaced the old facility. While the Ministry of Health promotes public participation in mental health awareness campaigns, such as a charity run to create a therapeutic garden for psychiatric patients, the hospital seeks to improve patient care through educational, rehabilitation, and therapeutic programs.

== Facilities and services ==
As of 2022, the SSB Hospital has 13 wards with a total capacity of 222 beds. Its services include anaesthesia, internal medicine, general surgery, paediatrics, obstetrics and gynaecology, emergency care, ophthalmology, orthopaedics, otorhinolaryngology, dialysis, endoscopy, dentistry, psychiatry, radiology, laboratory, pharmacy, and various specialist clinics.

== Issues ==
Sultan Hassanal Bolkiah expressed concerns about the shortage of doctors and medical supplies during a working visit to SSB Hospital on 6 July 2010. The Sultan was briefed on the hospital's 10-year expansion plans (2010–2020) by the CEO, which included proposals for new facilities such as an updated intensive care unit, expanded accident and emergency services, and a surgical block. To ensure the hospital could provide effective healthcare to the people of Belait District and alleviate the pressure on RIPAS Hospital, the plans also called for increased staffing, medical supplies, and equipment. With more than 700 employees, 325 of whom are medical professionals, the hospital saw a significant number of patients in the previous year, including 26,211 cases at the Accident and Emergency Section and 6,230 patients overall.

On 30 December 2023, heavy rain and unpredictable weather caused flooding in several areas of Belait District, including SSB Hospital, leading to the temporary closure of multiple clinical services. Several specialised clinics were impacted, and patients with scheduled appointments were informed of delays, while urgent cases were directed to designated areas. Visitors were restricted from entering the hospital until cleaning was completed. Similarly, flash flooding in August 2024 led to the temporary closure of 15 clinics for maintenance and cleaning, with the Ministry of Health ensuring that affected patient appointments would be rescheduled to minimise disruption.

== See also ==
- List of healthcare facilities in Brunei
