= Kampong Jerudong =

Village in Brunei

Kampong Jerudong Kampung Jerudong
- Village
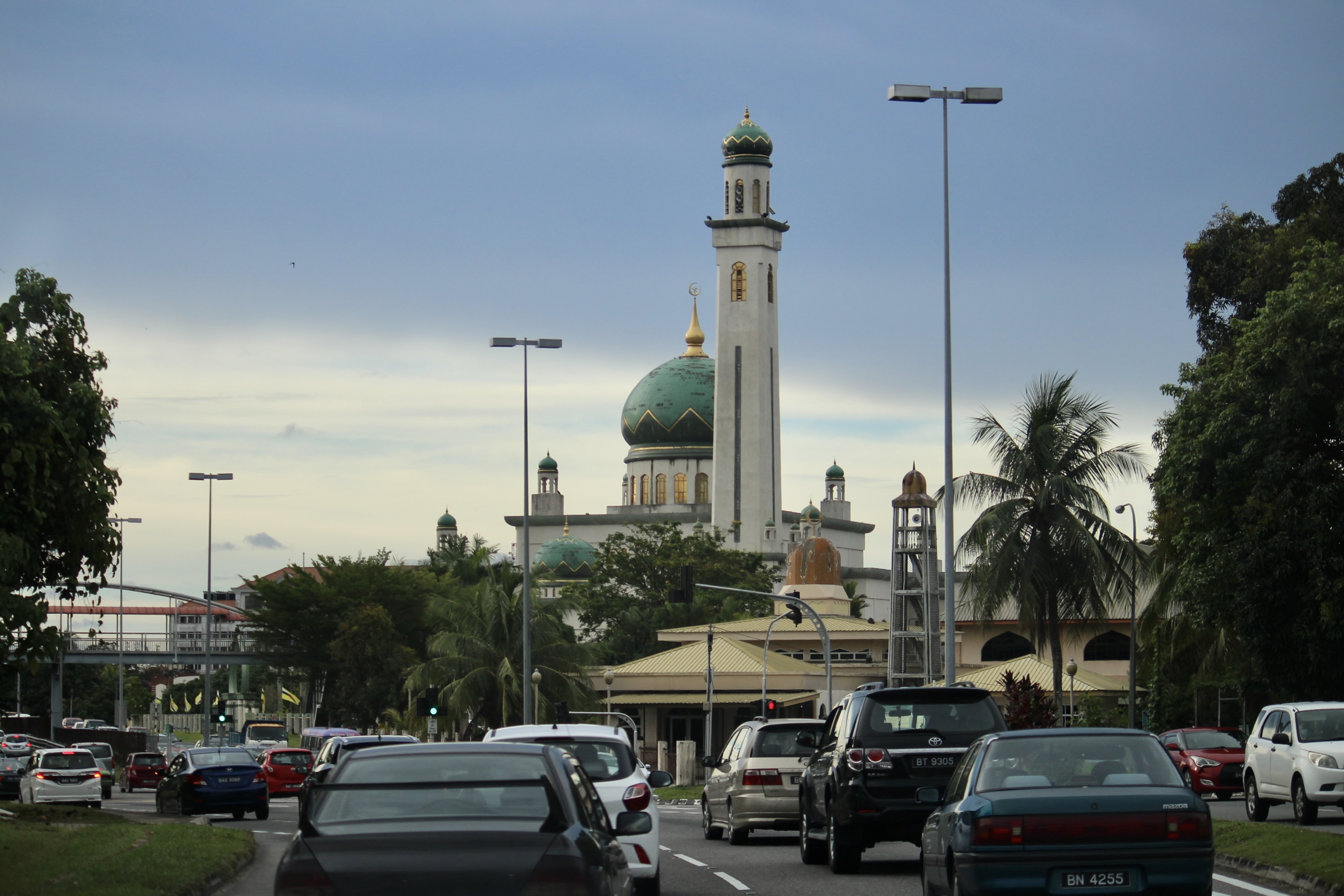
- Jalan Jerudong with the Al-Ameerah Al-Hajjah Maryam Mosque in the background

- Location in Brunei
- Coordinates: 4°56′14″N 114°50′31″E
- Country: Brunei
- District: Brunei–Muara
- Mukim: Sengkurong

Government
  - Village head: Mohammad Nazmi Fa'iz

Area
  - Total: 32.97 km^{2} (12.73 sq mi)

Population (2016)
  - Total: 3,856
  - Density: 117.0/km^{2} (302.9/sq mi)
- Time zone: UTC+8 (BNT)
- Postcode: BG3122

Kampong Jerudong is a village in Mukim Sengkurong, Brunei–Muara District, Brunei, about 21 kilometres (13 mi) from the capital Bandar Seri Begawan. The population was 3,856 in 2016. It is one of the settlements within Mukim Sengkurong. It is of historical interest as it is considered the starting point for the Kedayan community and where they first introduced rice cultivation. There are various stories about the origins of the Kedayan people, with some suggesting they came from Java. According to one account, Sultan Bolkiah brought the Kedayan to teach rice cultivation to his people, and they first settled in Kampong Pasir, Jerudong.

== Etymology ==
The name Kampong Jerudong is said to have originated from a folktale about two fishermen who were fishing in the Sungai Si Anggus river. Aya was the woman's name, and Dong was the man's. Aya inquired of Dong while he was fishing as to his residence. "Tu... jauh, Dong", Dong responded. This phrase led to the location being known as "Jerudong" throughout time. This is comparable to the origin of the term "Brunei", which was taken from the words "Baru-nah", pronounced by the Sakai people upon discovering a new settlement that they had been looking for.

Another version of the story, shared by the ketua kampong (village head) of Jerudong, Haji Mohd. Rais, recounts that the village did not have an official name until a man and a woman, both from different places, met there. The woman was grazing her pet buffalo when a man arrived and asked about the village's name. Upon learning that the village was unnamed, they decided to name it together. The man suggested that the woman add to his word, starting with "Ja," to which she added "Dong". From this, the village was named "Jadong", and over time, the name evolved into "Jerudong". The woman, who kept repeating the word, even named her buffalo "Jaudong".

== History ==
There had been oil exploration attempts being conducted in Jerudong in the past. In 1914, five shallow wells were drilled but abandoned in the following year due to geological issues. Nevertheless, drilling was renewed in 1940, and subsequently in 1955, by the then British Malayan Petroleum Company, resulting in the six wells being spudded. However, the wells yielded negligible results.

== Administration ==
In the past, Kampong Jerudong lacked a designated village head to oversee the settlement. Rather, the village's oldest inhabitant took on a leadership role, and the other residents obeyed the laws and regulations that this elder established. In addition, this elder oversaw all communal rituals and festivities. But when disagreements about who owned what property began to emerge, some people claimed land they didn't actually own, the government chose to formally designate a Ketua Kampung to settle these issues. Haji Ali bin Saban was Kampong Jerudong's first appointed village head. He served in that capacity until the Japanese occupation of Brunei. Following his term, Haji Jais bin Haji Ali, his son, took over as the village head and held the position for thirty years.

A total of 23 small villages included in Kampong Jerudong, namely Kampong Angor, Kampung Kampong Limau, Kampong Pancuran, Kampong Sungai Penipahan, Kampong Pulau Kubu, Kampong Pulau Mamut, Kampong Peninjau, Kampong Bukit Bunga, Kampong Bukit Kaboh, Kampong Bukit Seniwasa, Kampong Telaga Tabam, Kampong Temiang Lada, Kampong Kepayas Akar, Kampong Luahan, Kampong Mejawa, Kampong Durian Selangan, Kampong Tandueh Besar, Kampong Tandueh Kecil, Kampong Merasak, Kampong Menunggul, Kampong Siacang, Kampong Lampaki and Kampong Siandang. They are among the villages encompassed by Mukim Sengkurong.

== Economy ==
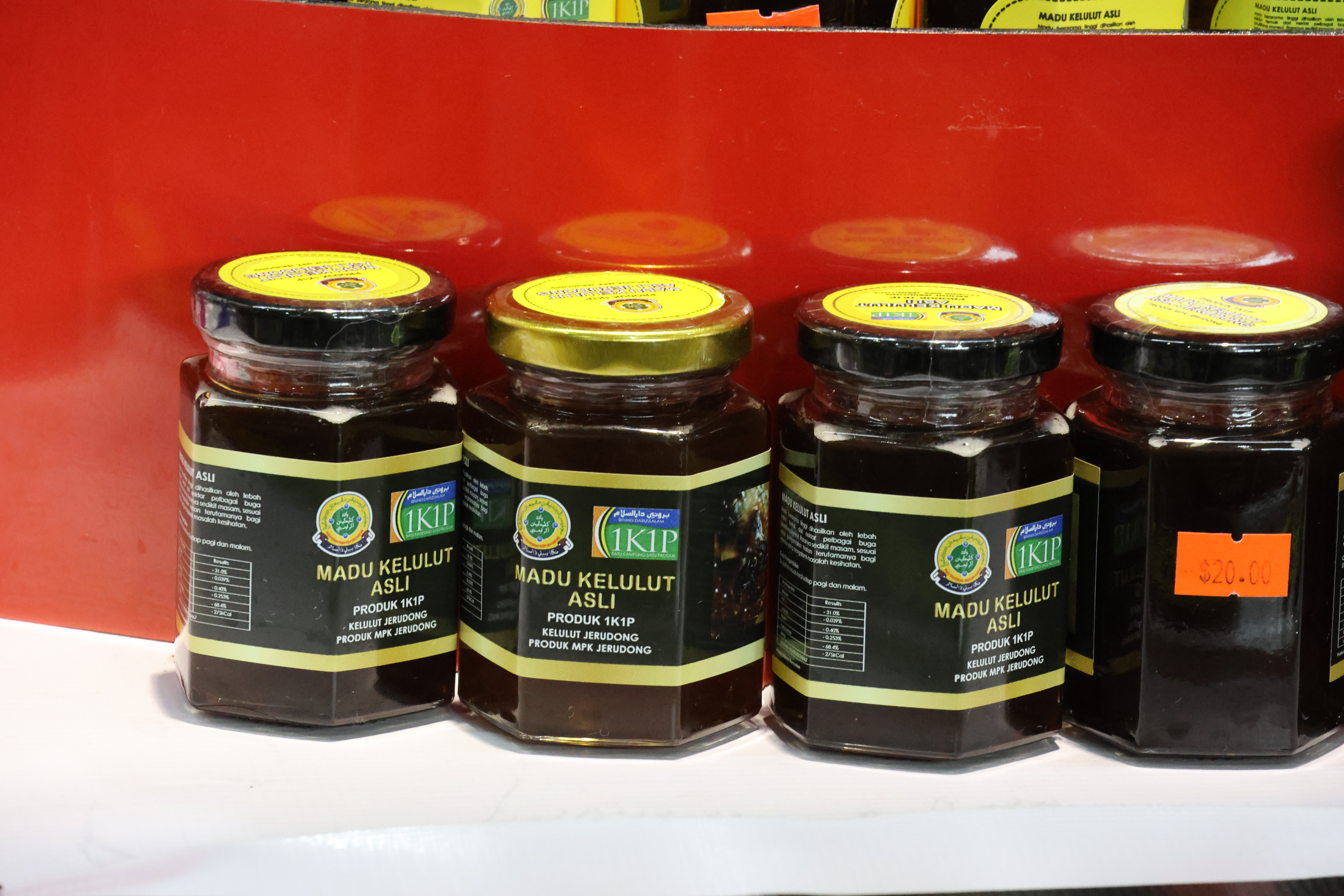
Locally produced sweet honey on display

The economy of Jerudong is based on a mixture of retail, service and hospitality. Jerudong has a number of grocery stores, restaurants and other types of shops which mainly cater the livelihood of the residents. It also has a fish market: Jerudong Market (Pasar Jerudong) is located close to Jerudong Beach, whereby the fish and other marine produce sold in the market are mainly catches by the fishermen going to the sea from this beach. The Jerudong Market is one of the two largest markets in the country, supported by the Minister of Home Affairs.

== Transportation ==
Kampong Jerudong is served by three major highways: the Muara–Tutong Highway, Jalan Jerudong, and the Jerudong–Tungku Highway. The Muara–Tutong Highway runs through Jerudong, connecting its northeastern and western points, while Jalan Jerudong spans the village in a north-south direction, terminating at Jerudong Beach in the north. These two roads are linked by an interchange and are also connected indirectly through a road that passes through Jerudong Park, leading to another interchange on the highway and terminating at a traffic light junction on Jalan Jerudong. Additionally, the western end of the Jerudong–Tungku Highway meets another traffic light junction on Jalan Jerudong at its eastern end.

== Infrastructure ==
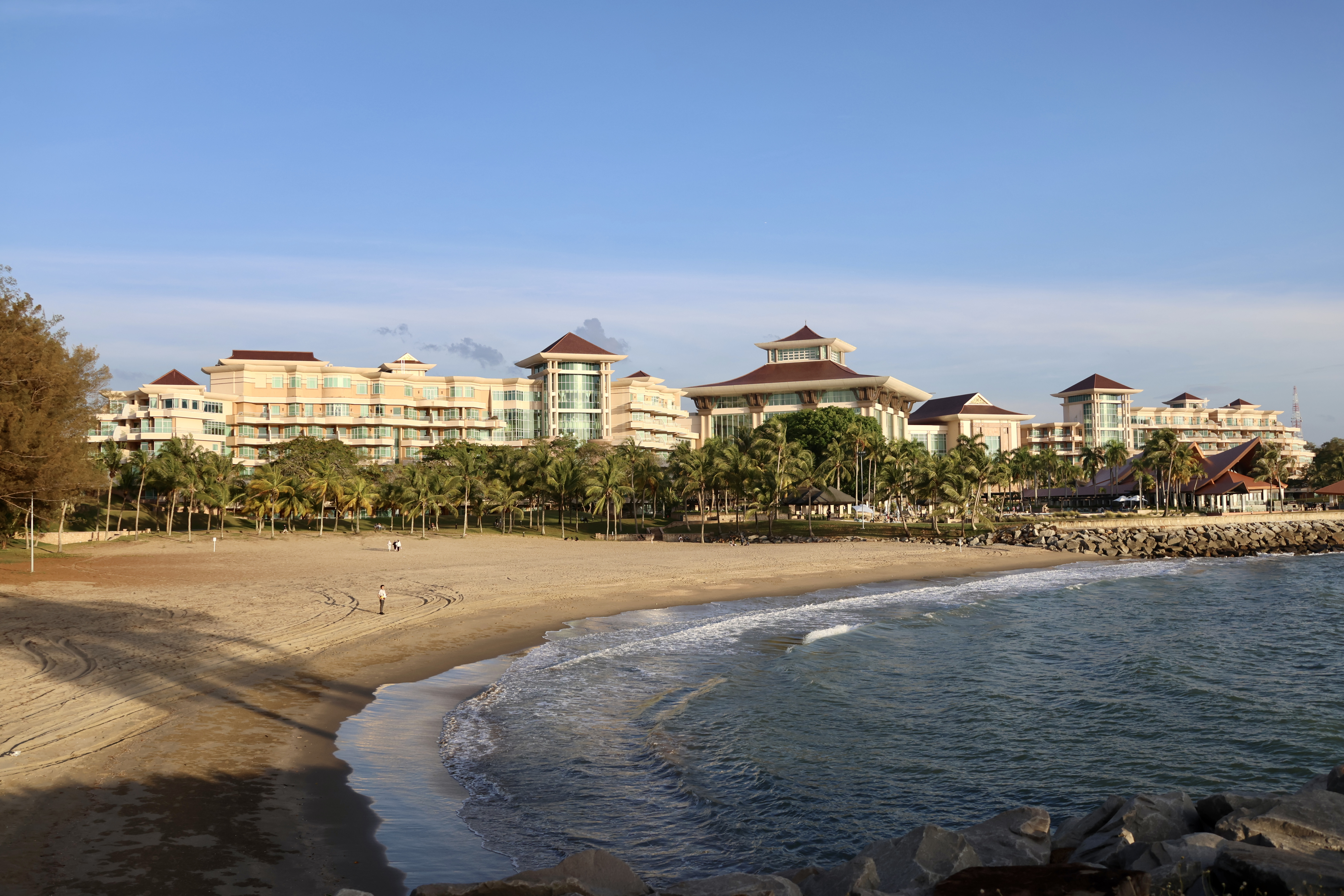
The Empire Brunei

Around 1951, road construction began in Kampong Jerudong, but it could not be fully utilised that year due to various issues. It took three years before residents could use it comfortably. Before the arrival of the Japanese forces, the villagers relied on candles for light at night. During the Japanese occupation of Brunei, gas lamps were introduced for use by the villagers. It wasn't until after the 1962 Brunei revolt that Kampong Jerudong began receiving electrical supply.

Bukit Shahbandar Forest Recreation Park features hiking trails and facilities for running and recreation, making it a popular destination for outdoor enthusiasts. Among the several hotels in Jerudong, the most notable is The Empire Brunei, a luxury 5-star beach resort that opened in 2000. Jerudong is also home to the BRIDEX International Conference Centre, which has hosted the Brunei Darussalam International Defence Exhibition, a biennial event showcasing arms and defence technology. Additionally, the village houses the consulates of Russia and Benin, as well as Istana Nurul Izzah, the residence of Mariam Abdul Aziz's family.

=== Education ===
According to accounts, before a school was established in Kampong Jerudong, residents who wished to study had to temporarily leave their families to attend school in the city. They could only return home during school holidays. At that time, the distance from the village to the city was considerable, and the main mode of transportation was riding water buffalo. The first school in Jerudong, named Jerudong Malay School, opened on 3 August 1957. The school later became the Jerudong Primary School is the village primary school, whereas Jerudong Religious School is the village school for the country's Islamic religious primary education.

=== Health ===
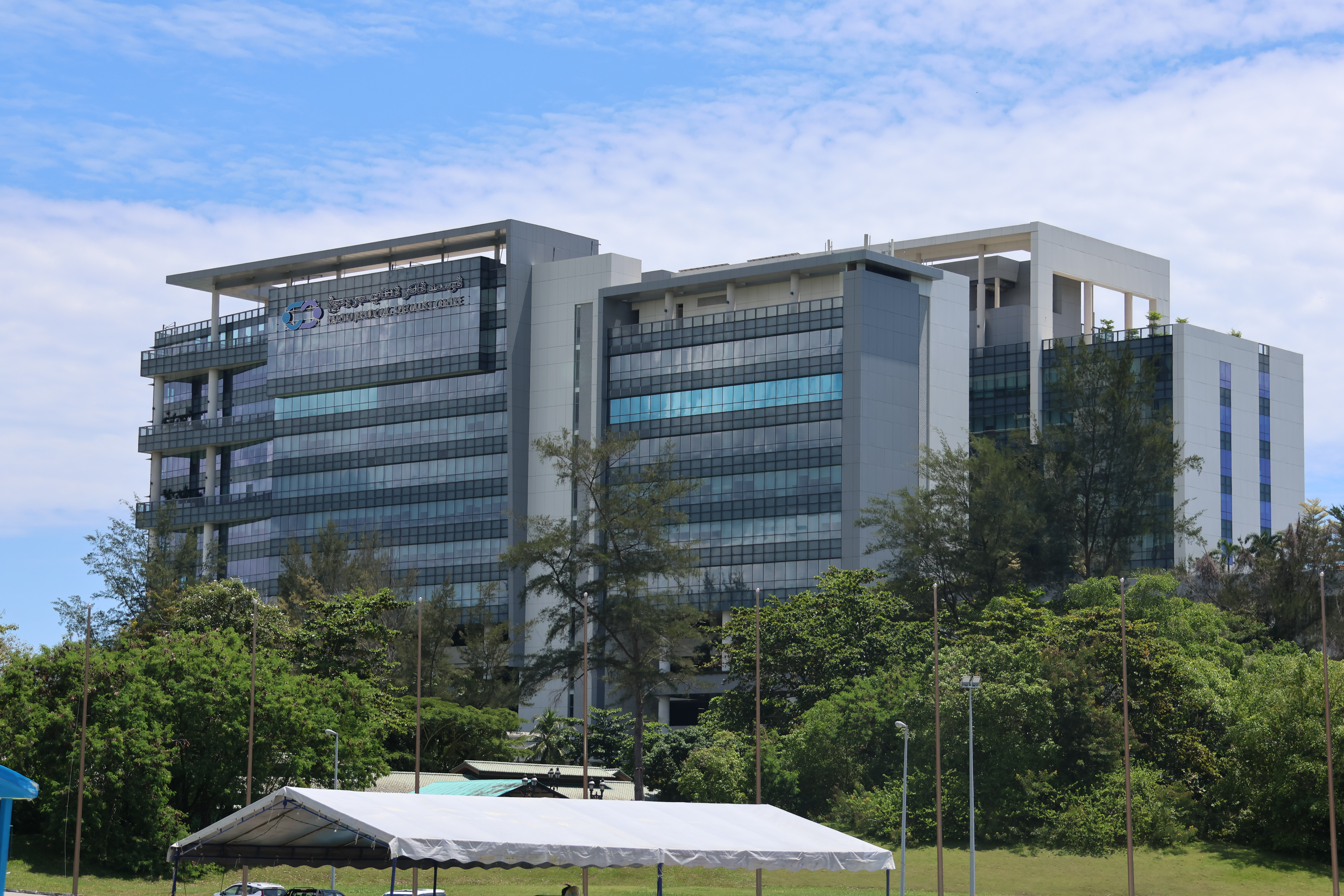
Pantai Jerudong Specialist Centre

Several prestigious medical facilities can be found in Jerudong, such as the Jerudong Park Medical Centre (JPMC), which is home to the specialty heart surgery clinic Gleneagles JPMC. The Brunei Cancer Centre (TBCC) and the Brunei Neuroscience Stroke and Rehabilitation Centre (BNSRC) are both housed inside the Pantai Jerudong Specialist Centre (PJSC), adding to the region's overall healthcare environment and offering vital medical services to the population.

The Ministry of Health (MoH) and EVYD Technology have announced the official opening of the Intelligence Hub at the MoH, located at the EVYD Campus in Jerudong. The hub brings together the Epidemic Intelligence and Response Unit (under the Disease Control Division), which serves as a surveillance centre to monitor the spread of diseases nationwide, the Climate Change Adaptation and Resilience Unit, and the Digital Health Unit.

=== Recreation ===
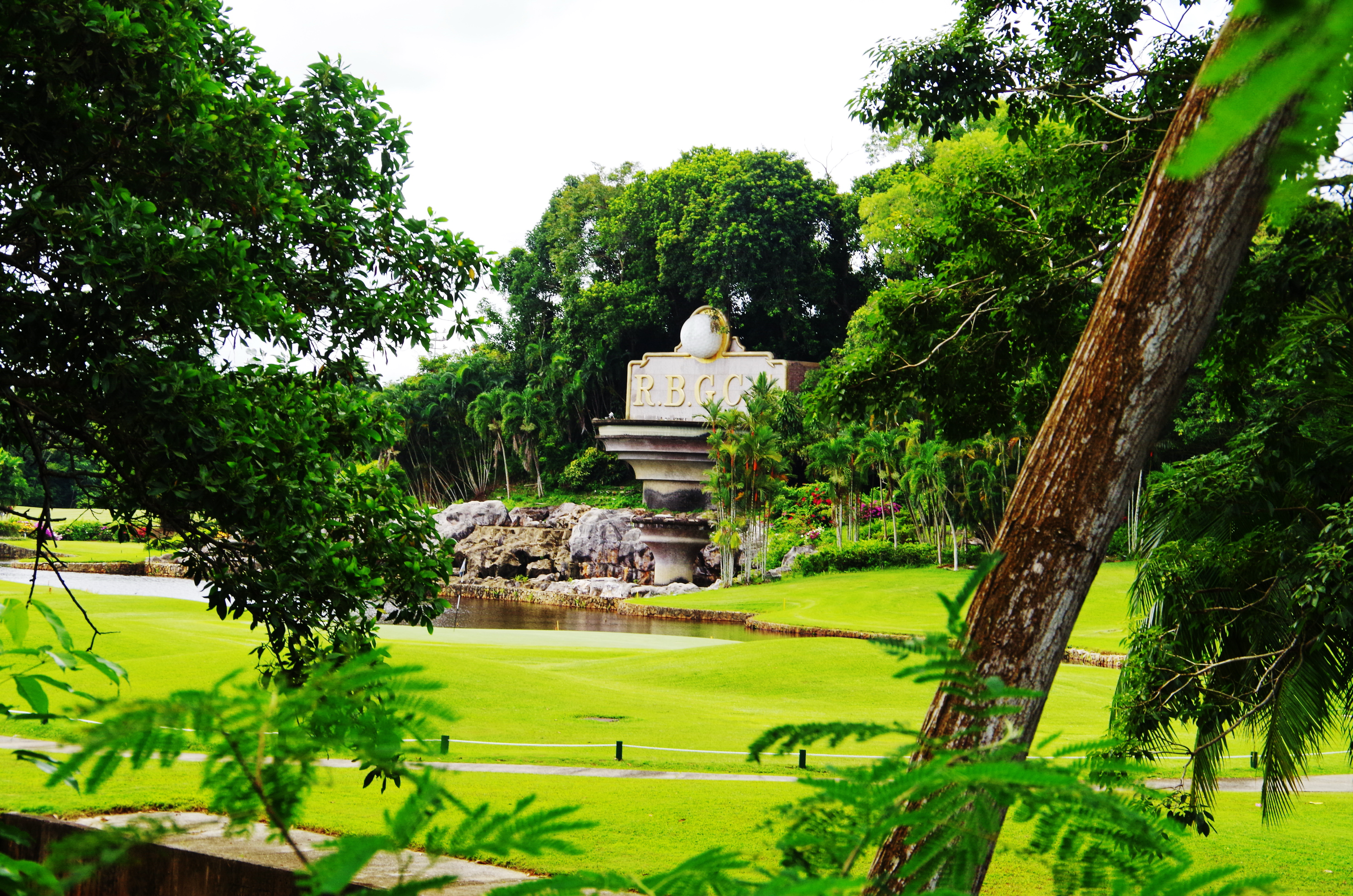
Royal Golf & Country Club fountain

Jerudong Park, the country's only amusement park, was opened in 1994. It used to offer free admission, which claimed to be the first amusement park in the world to do so. The park fell into disuse for several years but it was eventually revamped and relaunched in 2014. At present, Jerudong Park features several rides as well as a water park, musical fountain, food court and an indoor amphitheatre for events; the Jerudong Park Amphitheater once hosted concerts by Michael Jackson and Whitney Houston in 1996.

=== Religion ===
Pengiran Muda Hashim officiated the opening of the Kampong Jerudong Mosque on 14 August 1959, representing the sultan of Brunei. The existing mosque had grown too tiny and run-down to house the increasing number of worshipers, so a second mosque was constructed there in 1973. The Chief Kadi of Brunei, Abdul Hamid Bakal, gave the new mosque its ceremonial opening. The government, which provided half of the financing for its development, worked in tandem with the village's citizens to create it. Adjacent to the second mosque was constructed a third one in order to accommodate the growing congregation. Waqf (endowment) from Pengiran Isteri Hajjah Mariam binti Haji Abdul Aziz was used to build this mosque. On Friday, 28 January 1999, Sultan Hassanal Bolkiah gave it the formal opening. The mosque, named Al-Ameerah Al-Hajjah Maryam, can accommodate 2,000 worshippers.

== Notable people ==
- Pengiran Bahrin (born 1946), magistrate and politician
- Yakub Abu Bakar (1947–2007), minister and politician
