= Raja Isteri Pengiran Anak Saleha Hospital =

Hospital in Bandar Seri Begawan

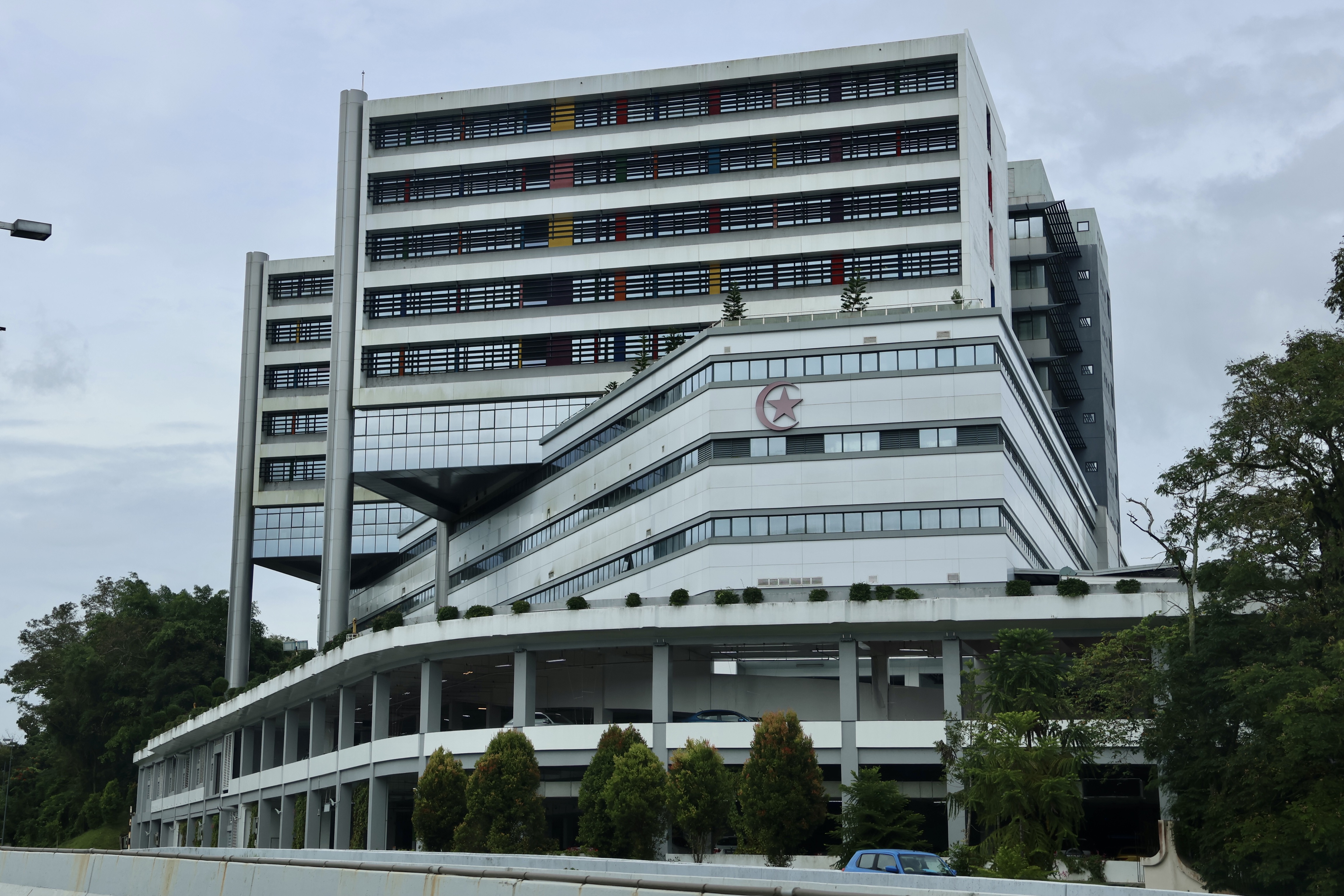
- The Women and Children's Centre block seen from the Sultan Hassanal Bolkiah Highway in December 2022

Geography
- Location: Jalan Putera Al-Muhtadee Billah, Bandar Seri Begawan, Brunei–Muara, Brunei
- Coordinates: 4°53′31″N 114°55′55″E

Organisation
- Care system: Public
- Type: General
- Religious affiliation: Sunni Islam

Services
- Emergency department: Yes
- Beds: 1,260

Helipads
- Helipad: Yes

History
- Founded: 28 August 1984; 41 years ago

Links
- Lists: Hospitals in Brunei

Raja Isteri Pengiran Anak Saleha Hospital (RIPAS Hospital; Malay: Hospital Raja Isteri Pengiran Anak Saleh) stands as the country's primary healthcare institution. Located in Kampong Kiulap, the hospital offers views of both the capital, Bandar Seri Begawan, and the Brunei River. Funded by the government and administered under the Ministry of Health (MoH), RIPAS Hospital was officially opened on 28 August 1984. The hospital accommodates 1,260 beds and has 257 doctors.

== Location ==
Raja Isteri Pengiran Anak Saleha Hospital is situated on a 17-hectare (42-acre) site located 0.8 kilometres (0.50 miles) from the city centre of Bandar Seri Begawan, the capital of Brunei. The site is also located close to the bank of the Kedayan River, which provides water transport access to the populaces of Kampong Ayer on the Brunei River.

== History ==
RIPAS Hospital, named after Raja Isteri Queen Saleha, was formally inaugurated on 28 August 1984, the same year Brunei attained independence. The B$162 million facility replaced the overcrowded Rumah Sakit Besar, which was unable to meet the growing medical and health needs of the nation. Since its inception, RIPAS Hospital has played a pivotal role in providing healthcare services to the public.

In October 2002, the Clinical Psychology Unit was established. As part of the 10th National Development Plan (RKN 10), RIPAS Hospital underwent considerable upgrades, including the construction of the Women and Children's Centre and the development of new roads to alleviate traffic congestion. These expansions increased the hospital's capacity, particularly with a 45% increase in the children's ward beds and a 51% increase in the maternity ward, ensuring better facilities to accommodate the growing patient demand.

The B$69 million Women and Children's Centre at RIPAS Hospital, completed as part of the earlier RKN 9, was officially inaugurated in December 2014. This 11-story building is dedicated to services for women and children and was formally launched in 2015. In addition to the Women and Children's Centre, RIPAS Hospital's Accident and Emergency Department has undergone significant expansion since 2015, increasing both space and equipment to improve service delivery.

Further renovations and expansions began in November 2016, with a focus on enhancing the Acute Medical Unit and Emergency Department. These improvements included adding a day care center, increasing bed capacity, and expanding treatment areas to reduce wait times and improve patient care. Looking ahead, RIPAS Hospital plans to construct a new 500-bed block and modernise its 40-year-old facility as part of a broader infrastructural development. These initiatives, along with the establishment of new health facilities and a national reference laboratory, are supported by significant funding from the Ministry of Health's proposed 2024–2025 budget, which also prioritises the use of digital technology to enhance healthcare delivery.

== Facilities and units ==
RIPAS Hospital is a comprehensive healthcare facility consisting of seven main blocks, each serving a crucial function in delivering a wide range of medical services. These include the Women and Children's Centre block, the Transport Complex, which is equipped with a helipad and jetty facilities, the Sports Complex, the Outpatients and State Lab block, the Ward blocks, the Specialist Clinics block, and the Plant and Engineering block. The hospital offers over 15 therapeutic specialties, such as medical services, surgical services, accident and emergency care, obstetrics and gynaecology, neurosurgery, and orthopaedics. Each year, RIPAS Hospital records 314,092 outpatient visits and 28,198 inpatient admissions, with a bed occupancy rate of 72%.

The Accident and Emergency Department is organised into three primary areas: the urgent (red) zone, the non-urgent (green) zone, and the resuscitation (yellow) zone. Following a restoration and expansion project, additional equipment was introduced to enhance these areas, and an emergency ward specifically for children was established in 2015. To further improve patient care, the Day Care Unit was set up in September 2016. This unit, which includes 12 beds and two reclining chairs, helps to streamline patient assessment and reduce unnecessary admissions by offering a one-stop centre for those undergoing major surgeries.

The Clinical Psychology Unit, founded in October 2002, has been instrumental in supporting a variety of medical disciplines, extending its services beyond psychiatry. The unit primarily focuses on behaviour therapy and cognitive-behavioural treatment. Although the psychiatry department has been in operation since 1985, psychotherapy services have evolved more slowly, with medical treatments typically taking precedence over psychological approaches.

=== Women and Children's Centre block ===
The 11-storey Women and Children's Centre block at RIPAS Hospital was built to enhance healthcare services for women and children by bringing essential services such as obstetrics, gynaecology, and paediatric care under one roof. This facility houses specialised units, including a paediatric clinic, obstetrics and gynaecology clinic, children's oncology ward, neonatal intensive care unit, special care baby unit, paediatric intensive care unit, general paediatric ward, and a specialised gynaecological ward. In addition, the block features 13 delivery suites, two operating rooms, a postnatal ward, seminar rooms, and a pharmacy. To accommodate staff and the public, the block also includes prayer rooms, a cafeteria, and basement parking with three convenient drop-off points. Shuttle bus services provide easy transportation to and from the Women and Children's Centre block and RIPAS Hospital's Outpatient Department.

== Training ==
Since 1982, a number of RIPAS Hospital's specialised training departments have received accreditation from the UK's Royal College of Physicians and Royal College of Surgeons. The Royal College of Paediatrics and Child Health Clinic has also granted the facility accreditation for basic specialty medical training. By obtaining accreditation from Queensland University Hospital as a teaching hospital in 2000, RIPAS Hospital further enhanced its qualifications.

== Criticisms and issues ==
During Sultan Hassanal Bolkiah's visit to RIPAS Hospital on 20 October 2010, several critical issues were brought to light, particularly the hospital's capacity and its reliance on foreign staff. Both inpatient and outpatient numbers have surged significantly; daily inpatient attendance increased from 351 to 398, while daily outpatient attendance rose from 819 in 2004 to 1,151 in 2009. Despite improvements in treatment time, the hospital has reached full capacity, suggesting the need for expansion or better resource management. Staffing issues were also highlighted, with only 35% of the 316 doctors at RIPAS Hospital being locals, and the remaining 65% comprised expatriates. To address this, the government introduced incentives such as a salary of up to $18,000 for physicians and efforts to encourage local doctors to specialize. However, the hospital's continued dependence on foreign workers underscores the challenge of training and retaining indigenous healthcare professionals.

In 2023, a customer service survey conducted by Epipeople Management and Consultant revealed several complaints from patients regarding their experiences at RIPAS Hospital. Patients cited rude staff, difficulties in receiving assistance, and staff being distracted by their mobile phones. Specific incidents included a gynaecologist using a smartphone flashlight during an examination and unhelpful registration counter employees. Other concerns raised were the mistreatment of foreign workers and language barriers. On a positive note, nurses were praised for their professionalism, empathy, and ability to care for vulnerable patients. The survey recommended improving staff approachability and installing information counters to better guide patients.

In a further indication of ongoing challenges, Sultan Hassanal Bolkiah acknowledged several issues with the healthcare system during an impromptu visit to the MoH on 25 May 2024. Among the complaints were long wait times for follow-up appointments and emergency care, the unavailability of medications after extended waiting periods, inadequate parking spaces, and instances of substandard patient care. Vulnerable populations, such as the elderly and expectant mothers, were reported to have received impolite treatment, and patients who were outside the correct catchment area were turned away. Additionally, health centers were criticized for providing unclear information, further compounding frustrations among patients. These ongoing issues reflect the need for improvements in both infrastructure and patient service at RIPAS Hospital.

== Gallery ==
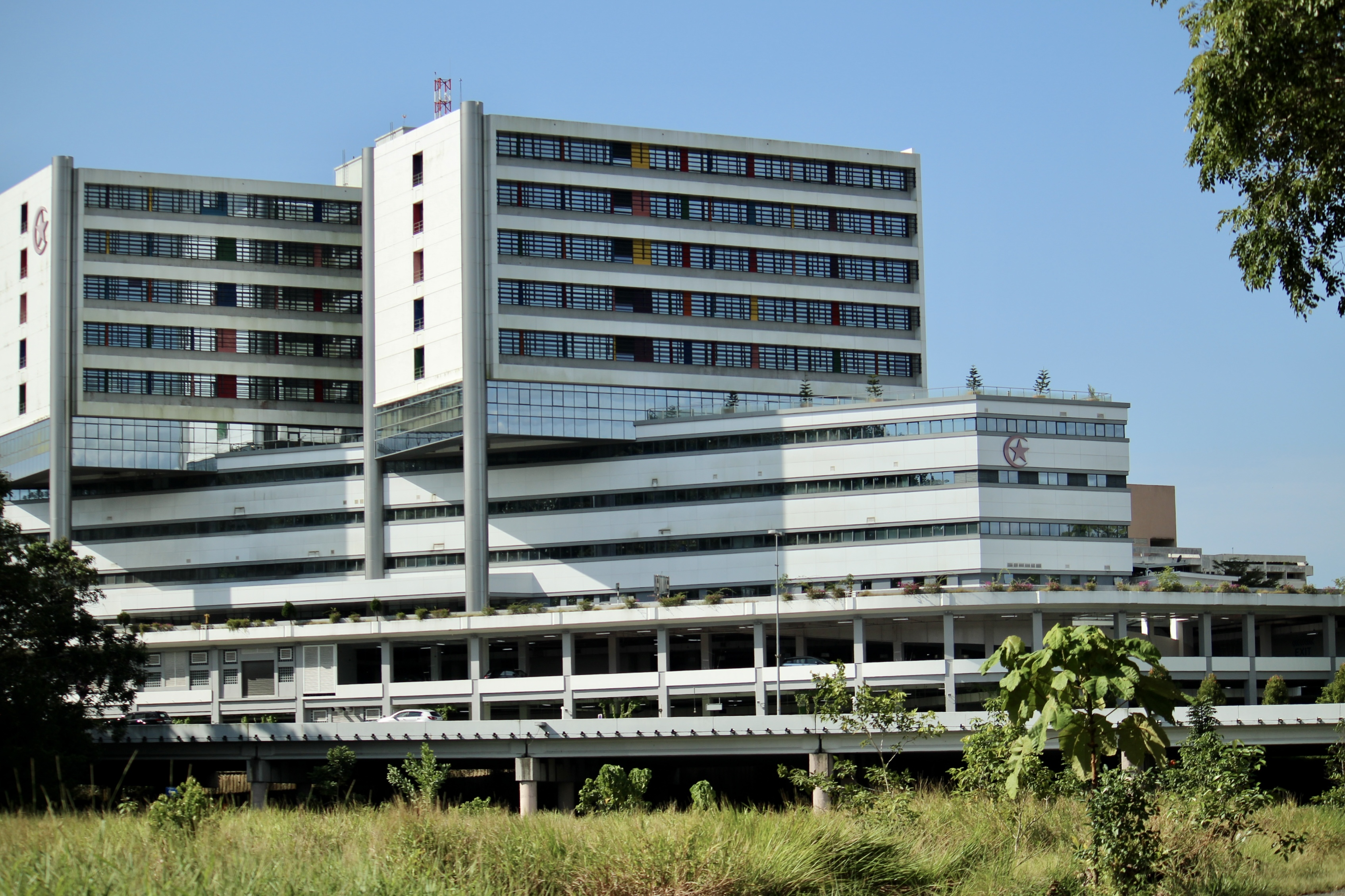
The Women and Children's Centre block at ground view from Batu Satu

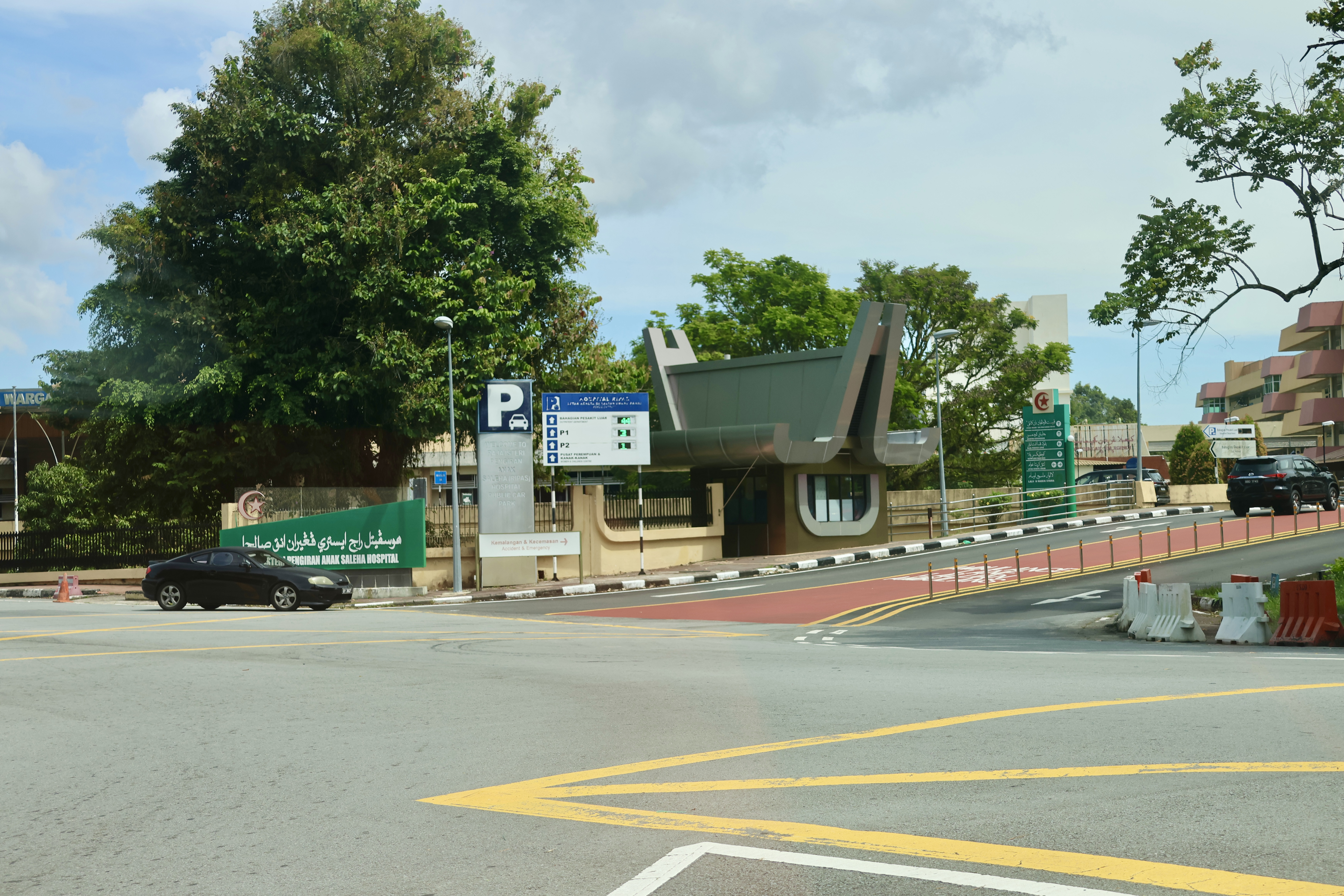
Main entrance to RIPAS Hospital

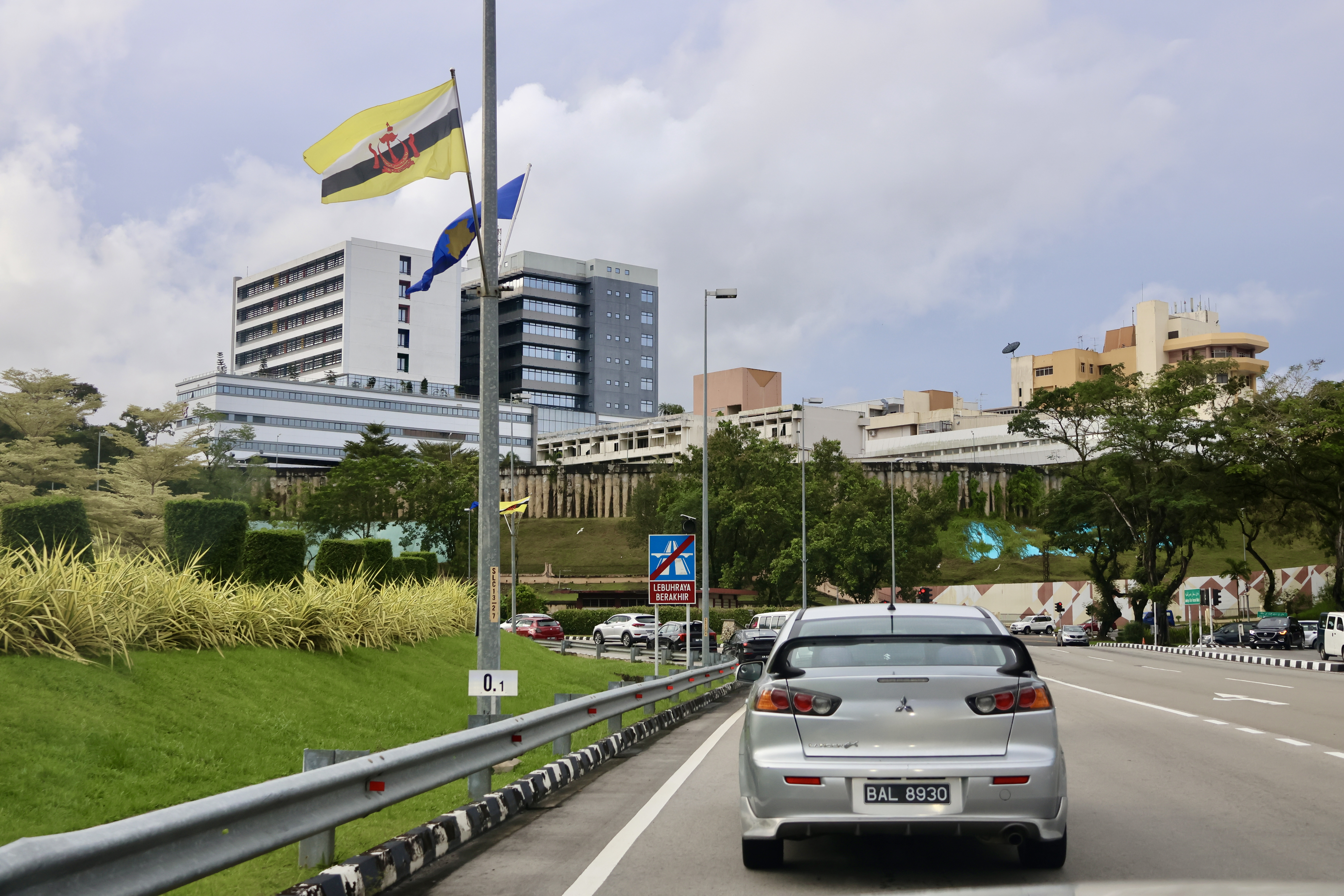
View of RIPAS Hospital from the Sultan Hassanal Bolkiah Highway

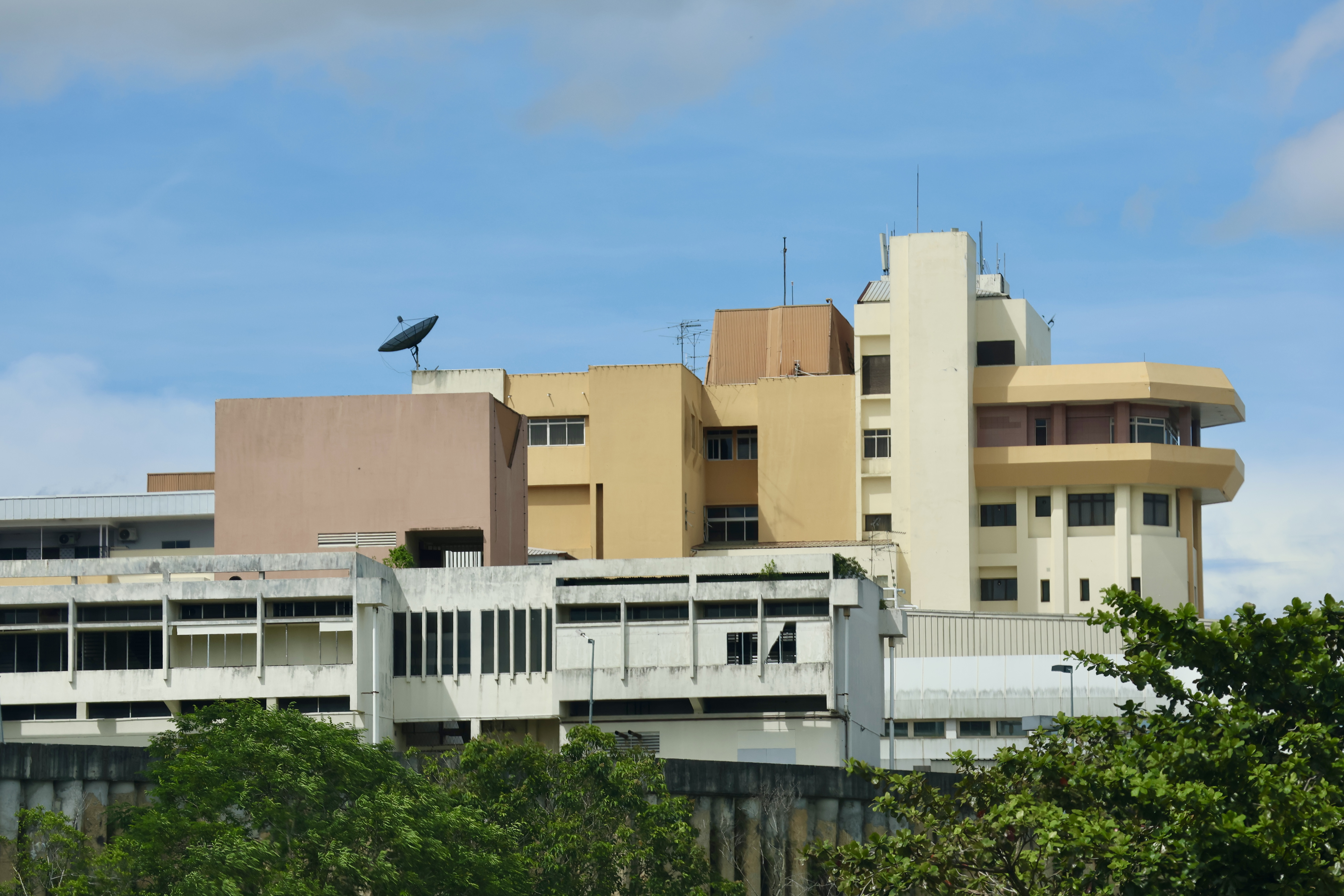
The older blocks of RIPAS Hospital

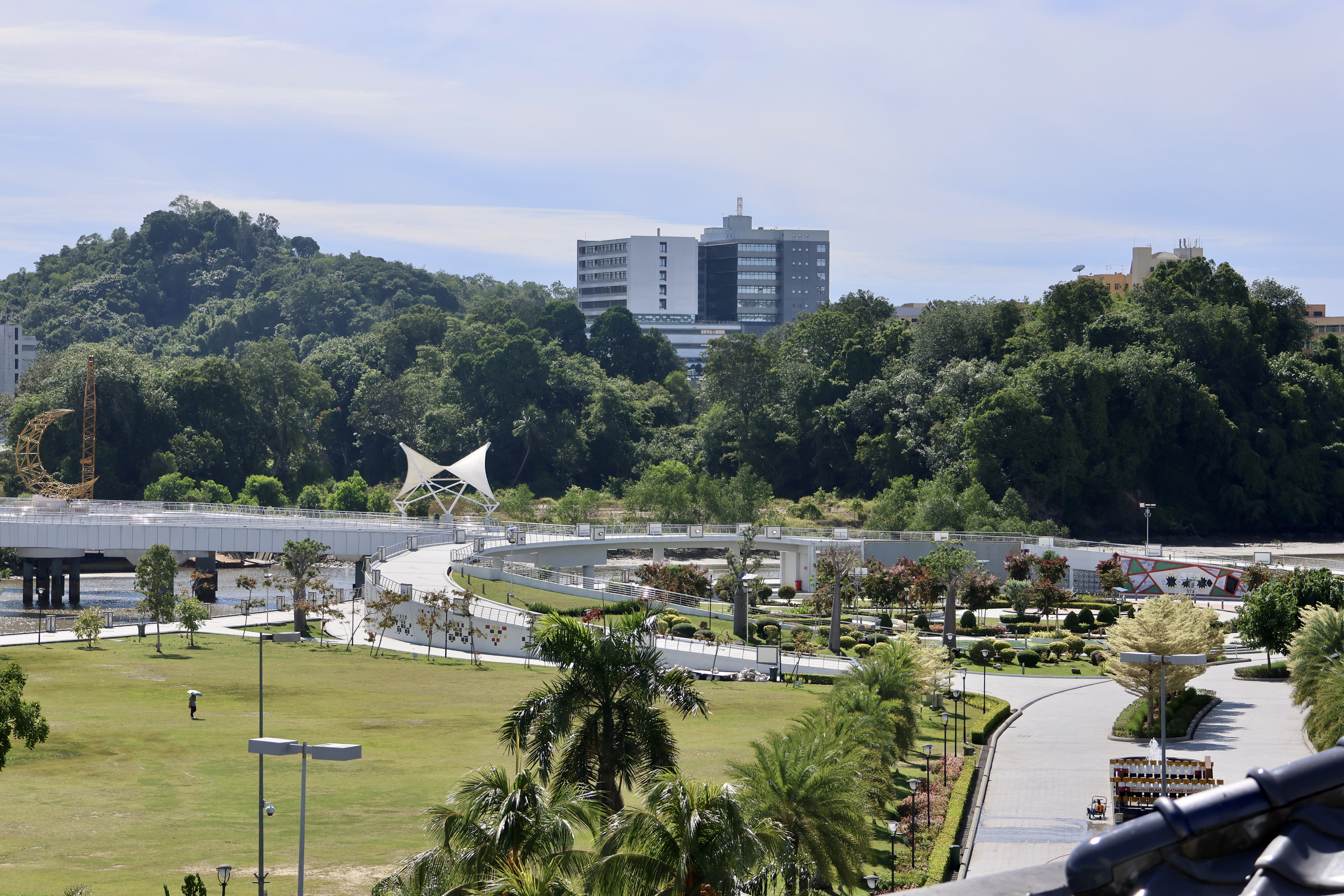
RIPAS Hospital seen from the Taman Mahkota Jubli Emas

== See also ==
- List of healthcare facilities in Brunei
