= Jerudong Park Medical Centre =

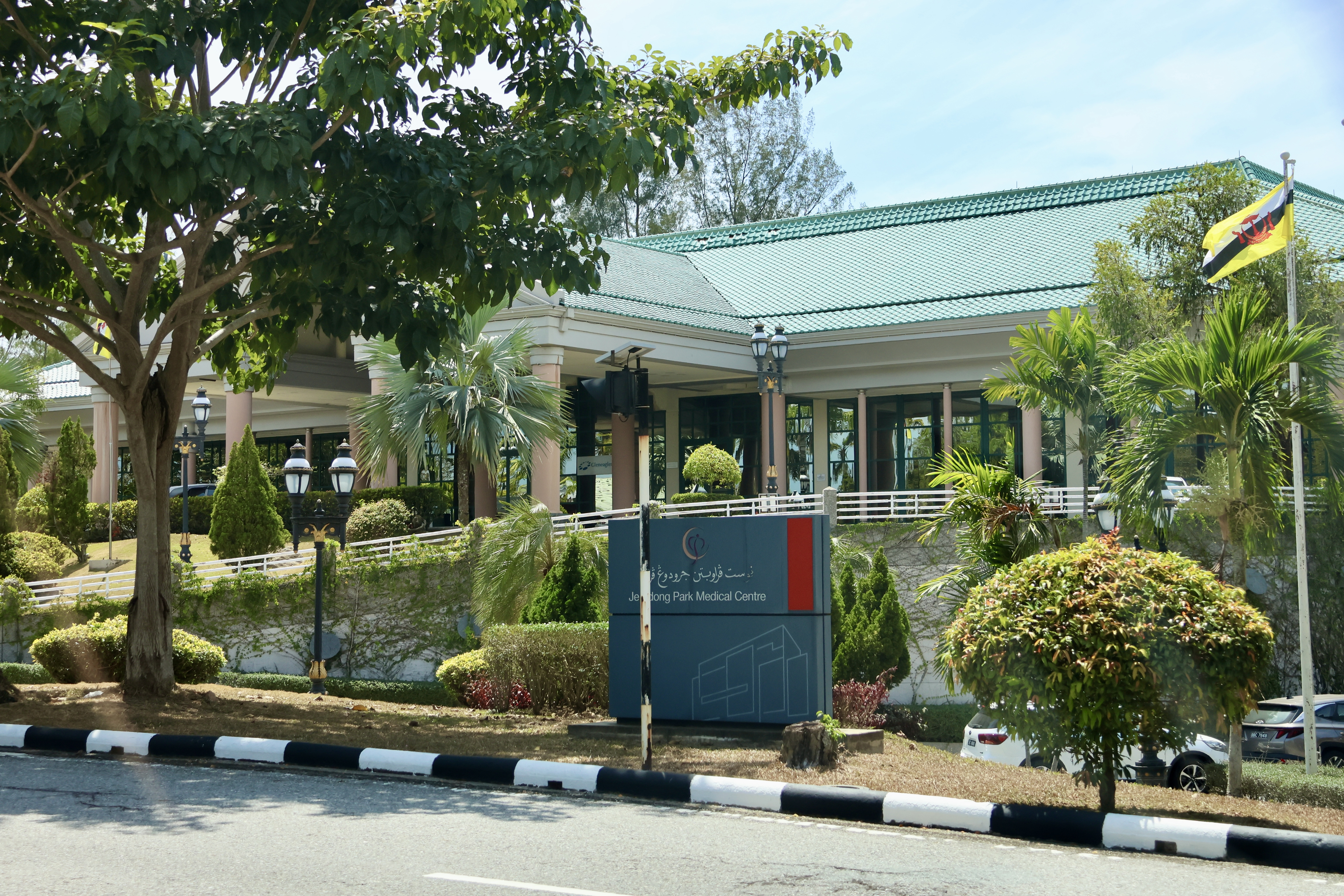
- Jerudong Park Medical Centre in 2024

Geography
- Location: Jerudong, Brunei-Muara, Brunei Darussalam
- Coordinates: 4°56′57″N 114°49′51″E

Organisation
- Care system: private
- Type: specialist

History
- Founded: 15 July 2002

Links
- Website: www.jpmc.com.bn

Jerudong Park Medical Centre (Malay: Pusat Perubatan Jerudong Park - JPMC), is a private hospital in Brunei-Muara District, Brunei Darussalam, which mainly provides specialised healthcare services. It is located in Jerudong, some 20 kilometres (12 miles) from Bandar Seri Begawan. The hospital also houses Gleneagles JPMC.

== Location ==
Jerudong Park Medical Centre is situated not far from Jerudong Park, a well-known family recreational centre and amusement park in Brunei.

== Services ==
Jerudong Park Medical Centre primarily provides specialised outpatient and inpatient clinical services, among them dermatology, gastroenterology, histopathology, nephrology, occupational health, psychology, dental, obstetrics and gynaecology, and paediatrics. Surgical services are also available for cases such as of the ear, nose and throat (ENT); implantology; ophthalmology; plastic and reconstructive; orthopaedics; general, paediatrics and laparoscopic, and urology. There are also auxiliary services such as laboratory, diagnostic imaging and radiology.

=== Gleneagles JPMC ===
Gleneagles JPMC is a dedicated centre within the hospital which provides healthcare services to cardiac patients. The centre was established on 15 July 2002; 23 years ago, and began operational on 8 August 2002. Its establishment is a joint venture between the Government of Brunei Darussalam and Parkway Pantai Limited, a regional private healthcare groups based in Singapore. The latter owns and handles the operation of Gleneagles JPMC.

== Accreditation ==
Jerudong Park Medical Centre is accredited by the Joint Commission International since 2004.

== See also ==
- List of healthcare facilities in Brunei
