= 2019 DPMM FC season =

19th season in existence of DPMM FC

DPMM FC
2019 season
- Chairman: HRH Prince Al-Muhtadee Billah
- Head coach: (England) Adrian Pennock
- Stadium: Hassanal Bolkiah National Stadium
Home colours	Away colours	Third colours

The 2019 season will be DPMM FC's 8th consecutive season in the top flight of Singapore football and in the Singapore Premier League. Along with the SGPL, the club will also compete in the Singapore Cup.

The club has also entered a domestic team to compete in the 2018–19 Brunei Premier League. DPMM became Brunei Premier League champions on 26 February.

On 15 September 2019, Brunei DPMM FC became champions of the 2019 Singapore Premier League with two games to spare after a 4–4 draw between Geylang International and Hougang United meant that DPMM's lead at the top of the table cannot be surpassed.

== Squad ==
=== S.League squad ===
No.	Name	Nationality	Date of birth (age)	Previous club	Contract Start	Contract end
Goalkeepers
1	Haimie Anak Nyaring	(Brunei)	31 May 1998 (age 28)	(Brunei) Indera SC	2018	2019
12	Ishyra Asmin Jabidi	(Brunei)	9 July 1998 (age 28)	(Brunei) Kasuka FC	2018	2019
25	Wardun Yussof	(Brunei)	14 September 1981 (age 45)	(Brunei) Majra FC	2006	2019
Defenders
2	Wafi Aminuddin	(Brunei)	20 September 2000 (age 26)	(Brunei) Tabuan Muda	2019	2019
3	Abdul Mu'iz Sisa	(Brunei)	20 April 1991 (age 35)	(Brunei) Indera SC	2016	2019
4	Fakharrazi Hassan	(Brunei)	15 July 1989 (age 37)	(Brunei) MS ABDB	2018	2019
5	Charlie Clough	(England)	4 September 1990 (age 36)	(England) Sutton United	2019	2019
11	Najib Tarif	(Brunei)	5 February 1988 (age 38)	(Brunei) Indera SC	2012	2019
13	Suhaimi Anak Sulau	(Brunei)	3 March 1996 (age 30)	(Brunei) Indera SC	2018	2019
14	Helmi Zambin	(Brunei)	30 March 1987 (age 39)	(Brunei) Indera SC	2009	2019
15	Hazwan Hamzah	(Brunei)	9 September 1991 (age 35)	(Brunei) Indera SC	2019	2019
23	Yura Indera Putera Yunos	(Brunei)	25 March 1996 (age 30)	(Brunei) Majra FC	2015	2019
24	Hanif Hamir	(Brunei)	22 February 1997 (age 29)	(Brunei) Tabuan Muda	2017	2019
Midfielders
6	Azwan Saleh	(Brunei)	1 June 1988 (age 38)	(Brunei) Indera SC	2006	2019
7	Azwan Ali Rahman	(Brunei)	11 January 1992 (age 34)	(Brunei) Indera SC	2013	2019
8	Hendra Azam Idris	(Brunei)	10 August 1988 (age 38)	(Brunei) QAF FC	2012	2019
16	Azim Izamuddin Suhaimi	(Brunei)	20 May 1997 (age 29)	(Brunei) Tabuan Muda	2016	2019
19	Nur Ikhwan Othman	(Brunei)	15 January 1993 (age 33)	(Brunei) Indera SC	2016	2019
20	Blake Ricciuto	(Australia) (Uruguay) (Italy)	2 September 1992 (age 34)	(Australia) Rockdale City Suns FC	2019	2019
Strikers
9	Abdul Azizi Ali Rahman	(Brunei)	17 January 1987 (age 39)	(Brunei) MS ABDB	2018	2019
10	Andrey Varankow	(Belarus)	8 February 1989 (age 37)	(Belarus) FC Gorodeya	2019	2019
17	Hakeme Yazid Said	(Brunei)	8 February 2003 (age 23)	Youth	2019	2019
18	Razimie Ramlli	(Brunei)	6 August 1990 (age 36)	(Brunei) MS ABDB	2019	2019
21	Adi Said	(Brunei)	15 October 1990 (age 35)	(Malaysia) UiTM FC	2019	2019
22	Shah Razen Said	(Brunei)	14 December 1985 (age 40)	(Brunei) Wijaya FC	2005	2019
Players who left during season
17	Shafie Effendy	(Brunei)	4 August 1995 (age 31)	(Brunei) Indera SC	2018	2019
21	Abdul Aziz Tamit	(Brunei)	7 September 1989 (age 37)	(Brunei) Kasuka FC	2018	2019

== Coaching staff ==
Position	Name	Ref.
Head Coach	(England) Adrian Pennock	
Assistant Coach	(Brunei) Moksen Mohammad	
Goalkeeping Coach	(Brunei) Zainol Ariffin Jumaat	
Fitness Coach	(England) Lindsay Davis	
Team Manager	(Brunei) Mohammad Ali bin Hj Momin	
Physiotherapist	(Brunei) Faisal Hashim & Masri Tahir	
Kitman	(Brunei) Kasim Amit	

== Transfers ==
=== Pre-Season transfers ===
==== In ====
Position	Player	Transferred from	Ref
Coach	(England) Adrian Pennock	Free Agent	
DF	(England) Charlie Clough	(England) Sutton United F.C.	
DF	(Brunei) Hazwan Hamzah	(Brunei) Indera SC	
DF	(Brunei) Wafi Aminuddin	(Brunei) Tabuan Muda	
MF	(Australia) (Uruguay) (Italy) Blake Ricciuto	(Australia) Rockdale City Suns FC	
FW	(Brunei) Razimie Ramlli	(Brunei) MS ABDB	
FW	(Belarus) Andrey Varankow	(Belarus) FC Gorodeya	

==== Out ====
Position	Player	Transferred To	Ref
Coach	(Brazil) Rene Weber	End of Contract	
DF	(Brunei) Reduan Petara	(Brunei) Kasuka FC	
DF	(Northern Ireland) Brian McLean	(Scotland) Dumbarton	
MF	(Brunei) Abdul Hariz Herman	(Brunei) Kasuka FC	
MF	(Iran) Mojtaba Esmaeilzadeh		
FW	(Ukraine) Volodymyr Pryyomov	(Belarus) Vitebsk	
FW	(Brunei) Adi Said	(Malaysia) UiTM F.C.	

==== Trial ====
Position	Player	Club	Ref
MF	(Brunei) Asnawi Syazni Abdul Aziz	(Brunei) Wijaya FC	
MF	(Brazil) Gérson Magrão	(Brazil) América MG	

=== Mid-season transfer ===
==== In ====
Position	Player	Transferred from	Ref
FW	(Brunei) Adi Said	(Malaysia) UiTM FC	
DF	(Brunei) Hakeme Yazid Said	Promoted from youth team	

==== Out ====
Position	Player	Transferred from	Ref
DF	(Brunei) Abdul Aziz Tamit		
MF	(Brunei) Shafie Effendy		

== Friendly ==
Win Draw Loss

29 January Pre-Season Friendly	Ayutthaya United (Thailand)	1–0	(Brunei) DPMM FC	Ayutthaya, Thailand
	Neto 65'	Report		Stadium: Ayutthaya Province Stadium, Ayutthaya

31 January Pre-Season Friendly	Thai Honda (Thailand)	3–0	(Brunei) DPMM FC	Bangkok, Thailand
		Report		Stadium: 72 Anniversary Stadium, Min Buri

2 February Pre-Season Friendly	MOF Customs United (Thailand)	A–A (Note: Only first-half was played which finished 0-0.)	(Brunei) DPMM FC	Samut Prakan, Thailand
				Stadium: Lad Krabang 54 Stadium, Bang Phli

4 February Pre-Season Friendly	DPMM FC	v	Deno FC	Jerudong, Brunei
20:00				Stadium: Jerudong Park Mini Stadium, Jerudong

12 February Pre-Season Friendly	DPMM FC	8–1	Kasuka FC	Jerudong, Brunei
		Report		Stadium: Jerudong Park Mini Stadium, Jerudong

19 February Pre-Season Friendly	DPMM FC	1–1	MS ABDB	Jerudong, Brunei
16:30				Stadium: Jerudong Park Mini Stadium, Jerudong

17 April Mid-Season Friendly	DPMM FC	1–2	MS ABDB	Jerudong, Brunei
				Stadium: Jerudong Park Mini Stadium, Jerudong

== Team statistics ==
=== Appearances and goals ===
As of 7 August 2019

No.	Pos.	Player	Sleague		Singapore Cup		Total	
No.	Pos.	Player	Apps.	Goals	Apps.	Goals	Apps.	Goals
1	GK	(Brunei) Haimie Anak Nyaring	1	0	2	0	3	0
2	DF	(Brunei) Wafi Aminuddin	2+1	0	0	0	3	0
3	DF	(Brunei) Abdul Mu'iz Sisa	9+3	0	2+1	0	15	0
4	DF	(Brunei) Fakharrazi Hassan	10+2	1	1	0	13	1
5	DF	(England) Charlie Clough	23	2	5	1	28	3
6	MF	(Brunei) Azwan Saleh	2+7	0	2+1	1	12	1
7	MF	(Brunei) Azwan Ali Rahman	17+2	3	3+1	2	23	5
8	MF	(Brunei) Hendra Azam Idris	18+3	2	4	0	25	2
9	FW	(Brunei) Abdul Azizi Ali Rahman	19+1	6	3	1	23	7
10	FW	(Belarus) Andrei Varankou	21+1	21	4+2	4	28	25
11	DF	(Brunei) Najib Tarif	17+2	0	2+2	0	23	0
12	GK	(Brunei) Ishyra Asmin Jabidi	0	0	0	0	0	0
13	DF	(Brunei) Suhaimi Anak Sulau	0+6	0	4+2	0	12	0
14	DF	(Brunei) Helmi Zambin	13+3	0	4	0	20	0
15	DF	(Brunei) Hazwan Hamzah	6+5	0	3+2	0	16	0
16	MF	(Brunei) Azim Izamuddin Suhaimi	0	0	0	0	0	0
17	FW	(Brunei) Hakeme Yazid Said	2	1	0	0	2	1
18	FW	(Brunei) Razimie Ramlli	2+18	3	2+2	1	24	4
19	MF	(Brunei) Nur Ikhwan Othman	19+1	0	3	0	23	0
20	MF	(Australia) Blake Ricciuto	23	9	5+1	0	29	9
21	FW	(Brunei) Adi Said	5+4	4	3+1	0	13	4
22	FW	(Brunei) Shah Razen Said	9+6	0	2	0	17	0
23	DF	(Brunei) Yura Indera Putera Yunos	16	0	3	0	19	0
24	DF	(Brunei) Hanif Hamir	8	0	4	0	12	0
25	GK	(Brunei) Wardun Yussof	22	0	3	0	25	0
Players who have played this season but had left the club or on loan to other club
17	MF	(Brunei) Shafie Effendy	0	0	0	0	0	0
21	DF	(Brunei) Abdul Aziz Tamit	0	0	0	0	0	0

== Competitions ==
=== Overview ===
Competition	Record							
Competition	P	W	D	L	GF	GA	GD	Win %
Singapore Premier League	24	15	5	4	51	25	+26	62.50
Singapore Cup	6	3	2	1	10	8	+2	50.00
Total	30	18	7	5	61	33	+28	60.00

=== Singapore Premier League ===
Win Draw Loss

3 March 2019 1	Home United (Singapore)	0–1	(Brunei) DPMM FC	Bishan Stadium
	Qaiyyim (yellow card) 35'; Hafiz (yellow card) 93'	Report	Varankow 21'; Ricciuto (yellow card) 93'	Referee: Ahmad A'Qashah

9 March 2019 2	DPMM FC (Brunei)	3–0	(Singapore) Geylang International	Hassanal Bolkiah National Stadium
	Ricciuto 22' (yellow card) 40'; Varankou 88' (pen.); Razimie 90'; Fakharrazi (yellow card) 17'	Report	Ifwat (yellow card) 42'; Jufri (yellow card) 64'; Noor Ariff (yellow card) 88'; Teh (yellow card) 90'	Referee: Y.Sathyakumar

15 March 2019 3	Albirex Niigata (S) (Singapore)	0–0	(Brunei) DPMM FC	Jurong East Stadium
	Sasahara (yellow card) 90+1'	Report	Azwan Ali (yellow card) 24'; Hendra (yellow card) 38'; Najib (yellow card) 38' (yellow-red card) 53'; Clough (yellow card) 68'	Referee: Farhan Mohamed

7 April 2019 4	DPMM FC (Brunei)	2–1	(Singapore) Tampines Rovers	Hassanal Bolkiah National Stadium
	Varankow 45'; Azwan A. 60'; Yura (yellow card) 21'; Razimie (yellow card) 82'; Hendra (yellow card) 90'	Report	Khairul 84'; Zulfadhmi (yellow card) 19'; Yasir (yellow card) 54'	Referee: Nathan Chan

13 April 2019 5	Balestier Khalsa (Singapore)	1–7	(Brunei) DPMM FC	Bishan Stadium
	Vrebac 79'; Goh (yellow card) 53'; Lee (yellow card) 63'; Sufianto (yellow card) 70'	Report	Varankou 14', 39', 59', 71' (pen.), 83'; Ricciuto 27', 31' (yellow card) 84'; Azizi (yellow card) 49'; Nurikhwan (yellow card) 53'	Referee: Muhammad Taqi

20 April 2019 6	DPMM FC (Brunei)	4–2	(Singapore) Warriors FC	Hassanal Bolkiah National Stadium
	Azwan A. 1'; Varankou 43' (pen.), 90'; Ricciuto 82'; Clough (yellow card) 63'	Report	Quak 52'; Sahil 68'	Referee: Lim Liang Yi

24 April 2019 7	DPMM FC (Brunei)	0–0	(Singapore) Young Lions FC	Hassanal Bolkiah National Stadium
	Varankou (yellow card) 32'; Helmi (yellow card) 90+3'	Report	Syed Akmal (yellow card) 39'; Nur Luqman (yellow card) 47'; Haiqal (yellow card) 62'; Mahler (yellow card) 83'; Zulqarnaen (yellow card) 85'	Referee: Farhan Mohamed

28 April 2019 8	DPMM FC (Brunei)	3–2	(Singapore) Hougang United	Hassanal Bolkiah National Stadium
	Ricciuto 20'; Varankou 65' (pen.); Hendra 90+4'; Clough (yellow card) 88'	Report	Plazibat 53', 55' (pen.); Vestering (yellow card) 33'; Hafiz (yellow card) 62'; Muhaimin (yellow card) 90+2'	Referee: Juherman Zaiton

4 May 2019 9	DPMM FC (Brunei)	2–0	(Singapore) Home United	Hassanal Bolkiah National Stadium
	Azizi 19'; Varankou 86'; Fakharrazi (yellow card) 54'; Nurikhwan (yellow card) 66'; Hendra (yellow card) 68'; Azwan A. (red card) 90'	Report	Hami (yellow card) 39'; Aqhari (yellow card) 74'	Referee: Farhan Mohamed

11 May 2019 10	Geylang International (Singapore)	1–3	(Brunei) DPMM FC	Our Tampines Hub
	Amy Recha 79'; Firdaus (yellow card) 15'; Danish (yellow card) 37' van Huizen (yellow card) 47'; Jufri (yellow card) 64'; Umar (yellow card) 90+5'	Report	Ricciuto 13'; Varankou 16', 36'; Nurikhwan (yellow card) 35'; Clough (yellow card) 74'; Azizi (red card) 90+4'	Referee: G. Letchman

24 May 2019 11	Albirex Niigata (S) (Singapore)	0–0	(Brunei) DPMM FC	Jurong East Stadium
		Report	Yura (yellow card) 70'	Referee: Juherman Zaiton

22 June 2019 12	Tampines Rovers (Singapore)	3–1	(Brunei) DPMM FC	Our Tampines Hub
	Megumi 26', 70'; Webb 40' (yellow card) 81'	Report	Razimie 27'; Azwan A. (yellow card) 43'; Yura (yellow card) 57' (yellow-red card) 64'	Referee: Jansen Foo

28 June 2019 13	DPMM FC (Brunei)	2–1	(Singapore) Balestier Khalsa	Hassanal Bolkiah National Stadium
	Azizi 5'; Ricciuto 52'	Report	Žužul 47' (yellow card) 59'; Sufianto (yellow card) 11'; Ahmad Syahir (yellow card) 39'	Referee: Lim Liang Yi

6 July 2019 14	Warriors FC (Singapore)	3–3	(Brunei) DPMM FC	Jurong East Stadium
	Quak 12', 65' (pen.); Béhé (penalty missed); Sahil 77'; Ifat (yellow card) 27'; Tajeli (yellow card) 53'; Poh (yellow card) 69'	Report	Azizi 29'; Azwan A. 38'; Ricciuto (yellow card) 25' (goal) 55'; Nurikhwan (red card) 62'	Referee: Farhan Mohamed

13 July 2019 15	Young Lions FC (Singapore)	0–1	(Brunei) DPMM FC	Jalan Besar Stadium
	Zharfan (yellow card) 11'; Zulqarnaen (yellow card) 15'	Report	Azizi 11' (yellow card) 11'	Referee: G. Letchman

19 July 2019 16	Hougang United (Singapore)	3–1	(Brunei) DPMM FC	Jalan Besar Stadium
	Faris 6' (pen.); Zulfahmi 32'; Nazrul 78'; Afiq (yellow card) 53'		Ricciuto 45+3'; Azwan A. (yellow card) 26'; Hazwan (yellow card) 32'; Clough (yellow card) 71'	Referee: Nathan Chan

27 July 2019 17	Home United (Singapore)	1–0	(Brunei) DPMM FC	Bishan Stadium
	Arshad 79'; Hafiz (yellow card) 90+1'	Report	Helmi (yellow card) 67'; Azwan A. (yellow card) 81'; Hendra (yellow card) 87'	Referee: Muhammad Taqi

2 August 2019 18	DPMM FC (Brunei)	3–0	(Singapore) Geylang International	Hassanal Bolkiah National Stadium
	Hakeme 47'; Hendra 53'; Adi 85'; Ricciuto (yellow card) 49'; Azizi (yellow card) 90'	Report	Ichikawa (yellow card) 81'	Referee: Syahir Ahmadi

10 September 2019 19 (Rescheduled)	DPMM FC (Brunei)	2–0	(Singapore) Albirex Niigata (S)	Hassanal Bolkiah National Stadium
	Razimie 67'; Adi 77'	Report

18 September 2019 20 (Rescheduled)	DPMM FC (Brunei)	0–1	(Singapore) Tampines Rovers	Hassanal Bolkiah National Stadium
			Webb 16'	Referee: Nathan Chan

1 September 2019 21	Balestier Khalsa (Singapore)	1–4	(Brunei) DPMM FC	Bishan Stadium
	Hazzuwan 44'	Report	Clough 3'; Varankou 13', 90+1'; Azizi 69'	Referee: Lim Liang Yi

14 September 2019 22	DPMM FC (Brunei)	3–0	(Singapore) Warriors FC	Hassanal Bolkiah National Stadium
	Varankou 31', 49', 67'	Report		Referee: Muhammad Zulfiqar

7 August 2019 23 (Rescheduled)	Young Lions FC (Singapore)	1–1	(Brunei) DPMM FC	Jalan Besar Stadium
	Naqiuddin 85'	Report	Clough 7'; Fakharrazi (yellow card) 42'; Yura (yellow card) 45' (yellow-red card) 71'	Referee: Lim Liang Yi

29 September 2019 24 (Rescheduled)	DPMM FC (Brunei)	5–4	(Singapore) Hougang United	Hassanal Bolkiah National Stadium
	Varankou 7', 37'; Adi 60', 82'; Fakharrazi 88'	Report	Shahfiq 56', 63', 72' (pen.); Fazrul 90+5'	Referee: Muhammad Taqi

Pos	Team	Pld	W	D	L	GF	GA	GD	Pts	Qualification or relegation
1	DPMM (Note: The two foreign clubs – Albirex Niigata (S) and DPMM – as well as the Football Association of Singapore (FAS) under-21 team, Young Lions, are ineligible for any AFC competition spots.) (C)	24	15	5	4	51	25	+26	50	
2	Tampines Rovers	24	12	8	4	52	29	+23	44	Qualification for AFC Champions League preliminary round 1
3	Hougang United	24	13	4	7	58	45	+13	43	Qualification for AFC Cup group stage
4	Albirex Niigata (S)	24	12	5	7	36	25	+11	41	
5	Geylang International	24	10	3	11	41	48	−7	33	

Source: Singapore Premier League
Rules for classification: 1) points; 2) goal difference; 3) number of goals scored; 4) number of wins
(C) Champions

=== Singapore Cup ===
Win Draw Loss

25 September 2019 Match 1	DPMM FC (Brunei)	1–1	(Singapore) Geylang International	Jalan Besar Stadium
	Varankou 90+3'	Report	Shawal 38'	Referee: Syahir Ahmadi

19 October 2019 Match 2	DPMM FC (Brunei)	1-0	(Singapore) Hougang United	Jalan Besar Stadium
	Varankou 82'	Report		Referee: Jansen Foo

23 October 2019 Match 3	Albirex Niigata (S) (Singapore)	0–1	(Brunei) DPMM FC	Jurong East Stadium
			Azwan A. 12'	Referee: Muhammad Zulfiqar

==== Semi-final ====
26 October 2019 SF Leg 1	Warriors FC (Singapore)	0–1	(Brunei) DPMM FC	Jurong East Stadium
			Azwan A. 41'	Referee: Ahmad A'Qashah

30 October 2019 SF Leg 2	DPMM FC (Brunei)	4–5 (a.e.t.) (5–5 agg.) (2–4 p)	(Singapore) Warriors FC	Jalan Besar Stadium
	Abdul Azizi 1'; Varankou 35', 60'; Razimie 98'		Behe 12' (pen.); Khairul Nizam 29'; Sahil 62', 101'; Quak 90+1'	Referee: Juherman Zaiton
	Penalties
	Varankou (penalty scored); Azwan A. (penalty missed); Ricciuto (penalty scored); Clough (penalty missed)		Khairul Nizam (penalty scored); Fukuda (penalty scored); Sahil (penalty scored); Tajeli (penalty scored)

Warriors FC won 4-2 on penalty after 5-5 aggregate.

==== 3rd/4th place ====
3 November 2019 3rd/4th place	Geylang International (Singapore)	2-2 (12–11 p)	(Brunei) DPMM FC	Jalan Besar Stadium
	Ifwat 75'; Fareez 85' (pen.)		Azwan S. 19'; Clough 90+5'	Referee: G. Letchman
	Penalties
	Maguire (penalty scored); Teh (penalty scored); Noor Ariff (penalty scored); Fareez (penalty scored); Harith (penalty scored); Aplin (penalty scored); Umar (penalty scored); Ichikawa (penalty scored); Ifwat Ismail (penalty scored); Shahrin (penalty scored); Zainol (penalty scored); Maguire (penalty scored)		Varankou (penalty scored); Adi (penalty scored); Ricciuto (penalty scored); Najib (penalty scored); Azwan A. (penalty scored); Helmi (penalty scored); Suhaimi (penalty scored); Hazwan (penalty scored); Yura (penalty scored); Clough (penalty scored); Haimie (penalty scored); Varankou (penalty missed)
