= 2021 DPMM FC season =

21st season in existence of DPMM FC

DPMM FC
2021 season
- Chairman: HRH Prince Al-Muhtadee Billah
- Head coach: (England) Adrian Pennock
- Stadium: Hassanal Bolkiah National Stadium
Home colours	Away colours

The 2021 season is DPMM FC's first season to compete in the Brunei Super League since 2005.

Pitch.BN will be their new kit manufacturer from 2021.

== Squad ==
=== Brunei Super League squad ===
No.	Name	Nationality	Date of birth (age)	Previous club	Contract start	Contract end
Goalkeepers
1	Emerson José da Conceição	(Brazil)	3 August 1982 (age 44)	(Brazil) Londrina Esporte Clube	2020	2021
12	Haimie Anak Nyaring	(Brunei)	31 May 1998 (age 28)	(Brunei) Indera SC	2018	2021
25	Wardun Yussof	(Brunei)	14 September 1981 (age 45)	(Brunei) Majra FC	2006	2021
Defenders
2	Wafi Aminuddin ^{U23}	(Brunei)	20 September 2000 (age 26)	(Brunei) Tabuan Muda	2019	2021
3	Abdul Mu'iz Sisa	(Brunei)	20 April 1991 (age 35)	(Brunei) Indera SC	2016	2021
5	Charlie Clough	(England)	4 September 1990 (age 36)	(England) Sutton United	2019	2021
13	Hanif Hamir	(Brunei)	22 February 1997 (age 29)	(Brunei) Tabuan Muda	2018	2021
14	Helmi Zambin	(Brunei)	30 March 1987 (age 39)	(Brunei) Indera SC	2009	2021
15	Hazwan Hamzah	(Brunei)	9 September 1991 (age 35)	(Brunei) Indera SC	2019	2021
20	Fakharrazi Hassan	(Brunei)	15 July 1989 (age 37)	Brunei DPMM II	2018	2021
21	Abdul Aziz Tamit	(Brunei)	7 September 1989 (age 37)	(Brunei) Kasuka FC	2018	2021
23	Yura Indera Putera Yunos	(Brunei)	25 March 1996 (age 30)	(Brunei) Majra FC	2015	2021
Midfielders
4	Hanif Farhan Azman ^{U23}	(Brunei)	2 November 2000 (age 25)	Youth	2020	2021
6	Azwan Saleh	(Brunei)	1 June 1988 (age 38)	(Brunei) Indera SC	2006	2021
7	Azwan Ali Rahman	(Brunei)	11 January 1992 (age 34)	(Brunei) Indera SC	2013	2021
8	Hendra Azam Idris	(Brunei)	10 August 1988 (age 38)	(Brunei) QAF FC	2012	2021
11	Najib Tarif	(Brunei)	5 February 1988 (age 38)	(Brunei) Indera SC	2012	2021
16	Nur Asyraffahmi Norsamri	(Brunei)	4 May 2000 (age 26)	(Brunei) Kota Ranger FC	2021	2021
19	Nur Ikhwan Othman	(Brunei)	15 January 1993 (age 33)	(Brunei) Indera SC	2016	2020
Strikers
9	Abdul Azizi Ali Rahman	(Brunei)	17 January 1987 (age 39)	(Brunei) MS ABDB	2018	2021
10	Andrey Varankow	(Belarus)	8 February 1989 (age 37)	(Belarus) FC Gorodeya	2019	2021
17	Hakeme Yazid Said ^{U23}	(Brunei)	8 February 2003 (age 23)	Youth	2019	2021
18	Razimie Ramlli	(Brunei)	6 August 1990 (age 36)	(Brunei) MS ABDB	2019	2021
22	Shah Razen Said	(Brunei)	14 December 1985 (age 40)	(Brunei) Wijaya FC	2005	2021
Players who left during season

== Coaching staff ==
Position	Name	Ref.
Head Coach	(England) Adrian Pennock	
Assistant Coach	(Brunei) Moksen Mohammad	
Goalkeeping Coach	(Brazil) Jorge Barbosa Ferreira	
Fitness Coach	(England) Jason Moriarty	
Team Manager	(Brunei) Mohammad Ali bin Hj Momin	
Physiotherapist	(Brunei) Faisal Hashim	
Kitman	(Brunei) Kassim Amit	

== Transfers ==
=== Pre-Season transfers ===
==== In ====
Position	Player	Transferred from	Ref
GK	(Brunei) Haimie Anak Nyaring	Free Agent	
DF	(Brunei) Fakharrazi Hassan	(Brunei) DPMM FC II	Promoted
DF	(Brunei) Hanif Hamir	Free Agent	
MF	(Brunei) Nur Asyraffahmi Norsamri	(Brunei) Kota Ranger FC	

==== Out ====
Position	Player	Transferred To	Ref
GK	(Brunei) Azriel Arman	(Brunei) MS ABDB	
DF	(Brunei) Suhaimi Anak Sulau	(Brunei) Hoist FT	

=== Mid-season transfer ===
==== In ====
Position	Player	Transferred from	Ref

==== Out ====
Position	Player	Transferred from	Ref

== Friendly ==
Win Draw Loss

== Team statistics ==
=== Appearances and goals ===
As of 2 August 2021

No.	Pos.	Player	Brunei Super League		FA Cup		Total	
No.	Pos.	Player	Apps.	Goals	Apps.	Goals	Apps.	Goals
1	GK	(Brazil) Emerson	3	0	0	0	3	0
2	DF	(Brunei) Wafi Aminuddin	2	0	0	0	2	0
3	DF	(Brunei) Abdul Mu'iz Sisa	1+1	0	0	0	2	0
4	MF	(Brunei) Hanif Farhan Azman	4+1	3	0	0	5	3
5	DF	(England) Charlie Clough	5	8	0	0	5	8
6	MF	(Brunei) Azwan Saleh	1+1	1	0	0	2	1
7	MF	(Brunei) Azwan Ali Rahman	5	5	0	0	5	5
8	MF	(Brunei) Hendra Azam Idris	5	0	0	0	5	0
9	FW	(Brunei) Abdul Azizi Ali Rahman	2	0	0	0	2	0
10	FW	(Belarus) Andrey Varankow	6	22	0	0	6	22
11	MF	(Brunei) Najib Tarif	5	1	0	0	5	1
12	GK	(Brunei) Haimie Anak Nyaring	2	0	0	0	2	0
13	DF	(Brunei) Hanif Hamir	2	0	0	0	2	0
14	DF	(Brunei) Helmi Zambin	2	0	0	0	2	0
15	DF	(Brunei) Hazwan Hamzah	2	0	0	0	2	0
16	MF	(Brunei) Nur Asyraffahmi Norsamri	1+5	2	0	0	6	2
17	FW	(Brunei) Hakeme Yazid Said	2+2	3	0	0	4	3
18	FW	(Brunei) Razimie Ramlli	1+2	3	0	0	3	3
19	MF	(Brunei) Nur Ikhwan Othman	3	1	0	0	3	1
20	DF	(Brunei) Fakharrazi Hassan	4	1	0	0	4	1
21	DF	(Brunei) Abdul Aziz Tamit	1+2	0	0	0	3	0
22	FW	(Brunei) Shah Razen Said	2+3	5	0	0	5	5
23	DF	(Brunei) Yura Indera Putera Yunos	4+1	0	0	0	5	0
25	GK	(Brunei) Wardun Yussof	1	0	0	0	1	0
Players who have played this season but had left the club or on loan to other club

== Competitions ==
=== Overview ===
Competition	Record							
Competition	P	W	D	L	GF	GA	GD	Win %

=== Brunei Super League ===
Win Draw Loss

27 June 2021 1	DPMM FC	16–1	BAKES FC	Jerudong
	Clough 2', 11', 39', 57', 72'; Varankou 4', 32', 44'; Nurikhwan 13'; Azwan A. 14', 37', 90'; Razimie 46', 70', 80'; Hakeme 82'	Report	Abdul Rahim 56'	Stadium: Jerudong Park Mini Stadium

4 July 2021 2	DPMM FC	15–0	Rimba Star FC	Jerudong
	Varankou 4', 35', 38', 45'; Fakharrazi 15'; Azwan A. 23'; Hanif Farhan 30' o.g. 31'; Clough 37'; Hakeme 61'; Shah Razen 65', 79', 87'; Azwan S. 85'; Najib 89'	Report		Stadium: Jerudong Park Mini Stadium

11 July 2021 3	DPMM FC	13–0	BSRC FC	Jerudong
	Varankou 1', 10', 22', 32', 58', 59', 83'; Shahrazen 18', 46'; Azwan A. 44'; Clough 80'; Asyraffahmi 87', 89'	Report		Stadium: Jerudong Park Mini Stadium

18 July 2021 4	DPMM FC	2–0	Indera SC	Jerudong
	Varankou 13' (pen.); Hanif Farhan 59'	Report		Stadium: Jerudong Park Mini Stadium

25 July 2021 5	DPMM FC	8–0	Wijaya FC	Jerudong
	Varankou 10', 12', 15', 16', 41', 56'; Clough 18'; Hakeme 28'	Report		Stadium: Jerudong Park Mini Stadium

1 August 2021 6	DPMM FC	2–0	Kasuka FC	Jerudong
	Hanif Farhan 16'; Varankou 40' (pen.)	Report		Stadium: Jerudong Park Mini Stadium

8 August 2021 7	DPMM FC	v	Kota Ranger FC	Jerudong
				Stadium: Jerudong Park Mini Stadium

15 August 2021 8	DPMM FC	v	Panchor Murai FC	Jerudong
				Stadium: Jerudong Park Mini Stadium

22 August 2021 9	DPMM FC	v	Setia Perdana FC	Jerudong
				Stadium: Jerudong Park Mini Stadium

12 September 2021 10	DPMM FC	v	Jerudong FC	Jerudong
				Stadium: Jerudong Park Mini Stadium

19 September 2021 11	DPMM FC	v	IKLS-MB5 FC	Jerudong
				Stadium: Jerudong Park Mini Stadium

26 September 2021 12	DPMM FC	v	MS ABDB	Jerudong
				Stadium: Jerudong Park Mini Stadium

3 October 2021 13	DPMM FC	v	MS PPDB	Jerudong
				Stadium: Jerudong Park Mini Stadium

17 October 2021 14	DPMM FC	v	KB FC	Jerudong
				Stadium: Jerudong Park Mini Stadium

Pos	Team	Pld	W	D	L	GF	GA	GD	Pts	Qualification or relegation
1	DPMM	6	6	0	0	56	1	+55	18	Qualification for AFC Cup play-off round
2	Kota Ranger	6	6	0	0	35	4	+31	18	
3	Indera	7	5	1	1	27	2	+25	16	
4	Kasuka	6	5	0	1	31	3	+28	15	
5	MS PPDB	6	4	0	2	14	9	+5	12	

Updated to match(es) played on 2 August 2021. Source: FABD
Rules for classification: 1) Points; 2) Goal difference; 3) Goals scored; 4) No. of wins; 5) Head-to-head; 6) Fair play record

=== Brunei FA Cup ===
Win Draw Loss

== See also ==
- 2017 DPMM FC season
- 2018 DPMM FC season
- 2019 DPMM FC season
- 2020 DPMM FC season
- 2021 DPMM FC season
