= Andrey Varankow =

Belarusian footballer

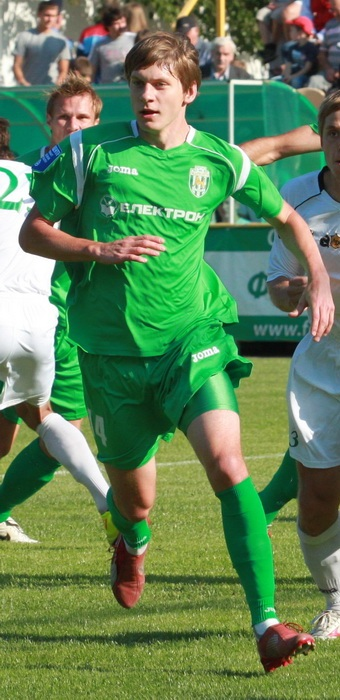
- Varankow playing for Karpaty Lviv in 2011

Personal information
- Full name: Andrey Nikolayevich Varankow
- Date of birth: 8 February 1989 (age 37)
- Place of birth: Mazyr, Belarusian SSR, Soviet Union
- Height: 1.85 m (6 ft 1 in)
- Position: Forward

Youth career
- 2005–2006: Slavia Mozyr

Senior career*
Years	Team	Apps	(Gls)
2007–2013	Dynamo Kyiv	0	(0)
2007–2009	→ Dynamo-2 Kyiv	65	(10)
2009	→ Obolon Kyiv (loan)	14	(5)
2010–2011	→ Kryvbas Kryvyi Rih (loan)	34	(11)
2011	→ Karpaty Lviv (loan)	5	(0)
2012	→ Neman Grodno (loan)	12	(2)
2012–2013	→ Metalurh Zaporizhya (loan)	9	(0)
2013	→ Dynamo-2 Kyiv	4	(3)
2014–2016	Slavia Mozyr	59	(13)
2017–2018	Gorodeya	39	(4)
2019–2023	DPMM	49	(55)
2023–2025	DMedia Minsk	4	(0)

International career^{‡}
2008–2011	Belarus U21	20	(6)
2012	Belarus Olympic	7	(1)
2007–2011	Belarus	9	(0)
- * Club domestic league appearances and goals as of 12 December 2023 ‡ National team caps and goals as of 26 April 2017

Andrey Varankow (Belarusian: Андрэй Мікалаевіч Варанкоў; born 8 February 1989), also spelled Andrey Voronkov, is a retired Belarusian professional footballer who plays as a forward.

== Club career ==
Varankow was on the books of Ukrainian powerhouses Dynamo Kyiv in the first six years of his career, going frequently out on loan while starring for his country at youth and full international levels. He severed ties with Dynamo in 2013 and returned to Belarus with initially Slavia Mozyr and then Gorodeya, performing modestly for a few years.

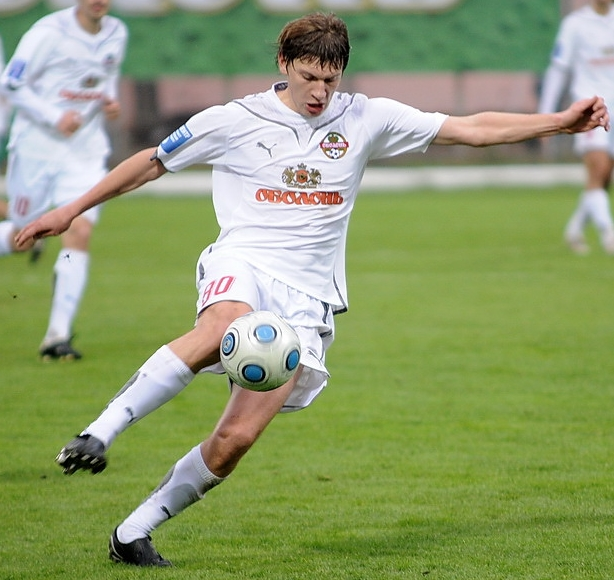
Andrey Varankow with Obolon Kyiv in 2009.

=== DPMM ===
Towards the end of 2018, Varankow attended a trial at Bruneian professional club DPMM who were in the market for an import striker after the departure of Volodymyr Pryyomov. He impressed head coach Adrian Pennock who signed him along with Charlie Clough and Blake Ricciuto for the 2019 Singapore Premier League campaign, with club hierarchy citing his international experience as a huge deal.

Varankow made his official debut for DPMM on 3 March away to Home United when he scored in the 21st minute for the only goal of the game. He would then make himself known to everyone in his fifth game against Balestier Khalsa, hitting the back of the net five times in a 1–7 victory.

The one-month break proved detrimental for DPMM who proceeded to lose to Tampines Rovers right after the league resumed. This also marked a barren spell for Varankow who suddenly could not score for the next five games before being taken off injured at half-time in a 3–1 defeat to Hougang United on 19 July. With Hougang catching DPMM on the league table and their striker Faris Ramli scoring for fun, the mid-season acquisition of brothers Adi Said and Hakeme Yazid Said cushioned the blow of Varankow's absence for DPMM in a morale-boosting 3–0 win against Geylang International.

Varankow rediscovered his scoring boots upon his return in September, netting a brace in a 1–4 victory over Balestier Khalsa which included a powerful free-kick into the bottom corner. A fortnight later, he scored a hat-trick against Warriors FC to pull DPMM ahead of the pack in the title race. The following day, title rivals Hougang faltered in a 4–4 draw to Geylang which sealed DPMM as league winners. Varankow finished the season as top scorer with 21 goals as well as joint-highest number of assists with 10.

In 2021, DPMM elected to play the 2021 Brunei Super League using their first team. Varankow made his domestic league debut on 27 June, scoring a hat-trick against BAKES in a 16–1 victory. He then scored four goals in a 15–0 romp of Rimba Star the following fixture, then scored seven in the 13–0 demolishing of BSRC on 11 July. He continued his barrage of strikes against Bruneian clubs with six goals in an 8–0 win over Wijaya on 25 July. He was leading the scoring charts with 23 goals when the league was stopped due to the onset of local COVID-19 transmissions.

After the suspension of the league and being out of contract in 2022, he returned to DPMM the next year for the 2023 Singapore Premier League. He scored his first goal since coming back in the 3–4 defeat against Balestier Khalsa on 10 March. Varankow helped to secure the club first win in their return to the league with a 2–1 win against Tanjong Pagar United in which he scored. On 13 May 2023, he scored a hat-trick against Lion City Sailors in which the game ended in a 3–3 draw. At the end of the season, he was released by the Bruneian club.

== International career ==
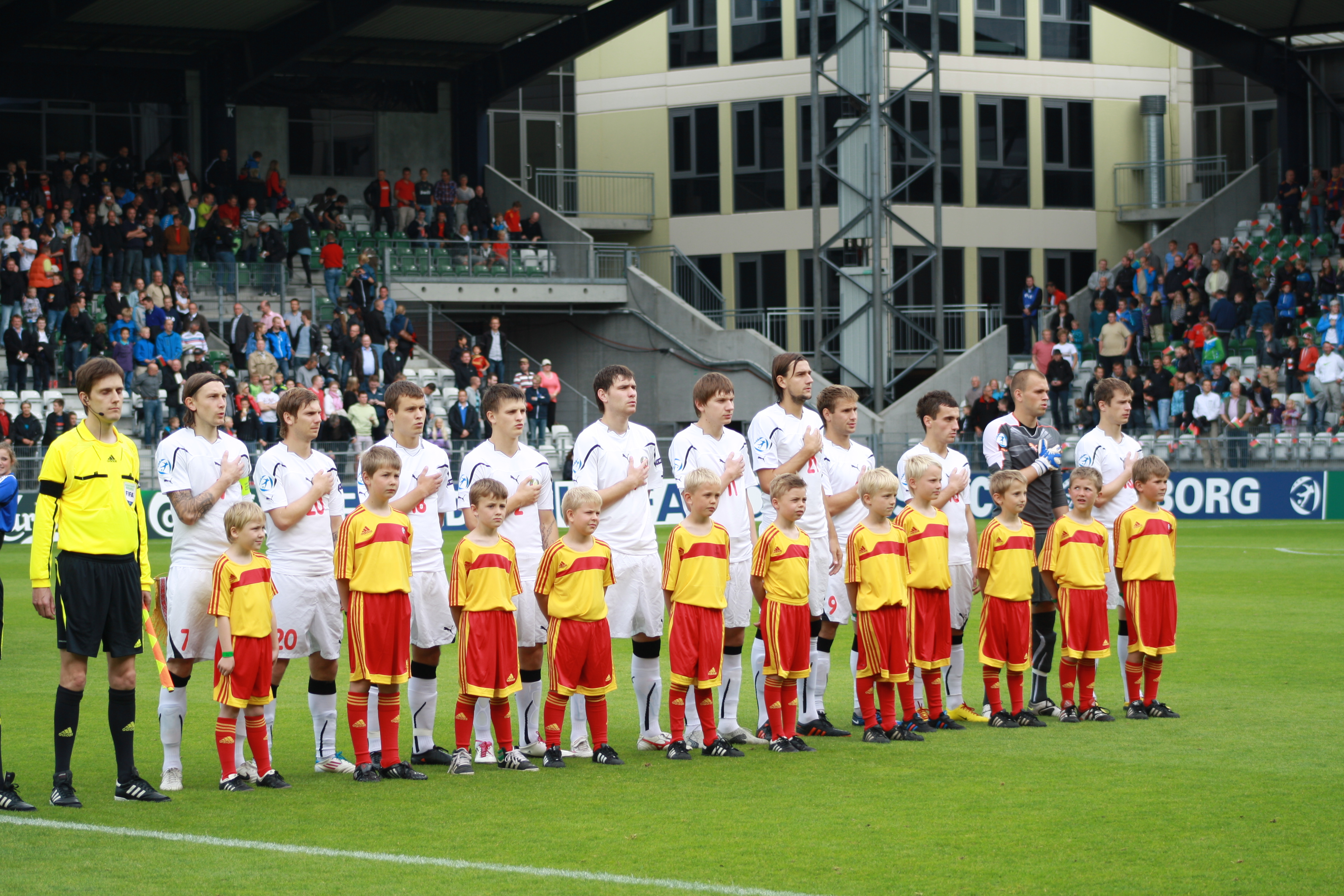
Andrey Varankow with the Belarus U21 team in 2011.

Varankow debuted in Belarus national football team in a Euro 2008 qualifying match against Luxembourg on 13 October 2007. He was a member of the Belarus U21 that finished in 3rd place at the 2011 UEFA European Under-21 Football Championship, playing all five matches and scoring twice, against Iceland U21 and Spain U21.

Varankow was part of the Belarus U23 squad at the 2012 Summer Olympics, scoring a goal against Egypt U23 in a 3–1 lost at the Hampden Park.

== Career statistics ==
=== Club ===
As of 4 November 2023

Club	Season	League			Ukraine Cup		Super Cup		Continental Cup		Total	
Club	Season	Division	Apps	Goals	Apps	Goals	Apps	Goals	Apps	Goals	Apps	Goals
Obolon-Brovar Kyiv (loan)	2008/09	Ukrainian Premier League	13	5	1	0	0	0	0	0	14	5
Obolon-Brovar Kyiv (loan)	Total		13	5	1	0	0	0	0	0	14	5
Kryvbas Kryvyi Rih (loan)	2009/10	Ukrainian Premier League	13	5	0	0	0	0	0	0	13	5
Kryvbas Kryvyi Rih (loan)	2010/11	Ukrainian Premier League	21	6	0	0	0	0	0	0	21	6
Kryvbas Kryvyi Rih (loan)	Total		34	11	1	0	0	0	0	0	35	11
Karpaty Lviv (loan)	2011/12	Ukrainian Premier League	5	0	1	0	0	0	3	1	9	1
Karpaty Lviv (loan)	Total		5	0	1	0	0	0	3	1	9	1
Club	Season	League			Belarus Cup		Super Cup		Continental Cup		Total	
Club	Season	Division	Apps	Goals	Apps	Goals	Apps	Goals	Apps	Goals	Apps	Goals
Slavia Mozyr (loan)	2012	Belarusian Premier League	12	2	0	0	0	0	0	0	12	2
Slavia Mozyr (loan)	Total		12	2	0	0	0	0	0	0	12	2
Club	Season	League			Ukraine Cup		Super Cup		AFC Cup		Total	
Club	Season	Division	Apps	Goals	Apps	Goals	Apps	Goals	Apps	Goals	Apps	Goals
Metalurh Zaporizhya (loan)	2012/13	Ukrainian Premier League	9	0	0	0	0	0	0	0	9	0
Metalurh Zaporizhya (loan)	Total		9	0	0	0	0	0	0	0	9	0
Dynamo-2 Kyiv (loan)	2012/13	Ukrainian First League	4	3	0	0	0	0	0	0	4	3
Dynamo-2 Kyiv (loan)	Total		4	3	0	0	0	0	0	0	4	3
Club	Season	League			Belarus Cup		Super Cup		Continental Cup		Total	
Club	Season	Division	Apps	Goals	Apps	Goals	Apps	Goals	Apps	Goals	Apps	Goals
Slavia Mozyr	2014	Belarusian First League	11	6	0	0	0	0	0	0	11	6
Slavia Mozyr	2015	Belarusian Premier League	22	3	2	0	0	0	0	0	24	3
Slavia Mozyr	2016	Belarusian Premier League	26	4	2	0	0	0	0	0	28	4
Slavia Mozyr	Total		59	13	4	0	0	0	0	0	63	13
Gorodeya	2017	Belarusian Premier League	28	4	0	0	0	0	0	0	28	4
Gorodeya	2018	Belarusian Premier League	11	0	0	0	0	0	0	0	11	0
Gorodeya	Total		39	4	0	0	0	0	0	0	39	4
Club	Season	League			Singapore Cup		League Cup		AFC Cup		Total	
Club	Season	Division	Apps	Goals	Apps	Goals	Apps	Goals	Apps	Goals	Apps	Goals
DPMM	2019	Singapore Premier League	22	21	6	2	0	0	0	0	28	23
DPMM	2020	Singapore Premier League	1	1	0	0	0	0	0	0	1	1
DPMM	2021	Brunei Super League	6	23	0	0	0	0	0	0	6	23
DPMM	2023	Singapore Premier League	20	9	4	1	0	0	0	0	24	10
DPMM	Total		49	54	10	3	0	0	0	0	59	57
Career total			224	92	17	3	0	0	3	1	244	96

== Honours ==
=== Club ===
==== Dynamo Kyiv ====
- Ukrainian Super Cup: 2007

==== Brunei DPMM FC ====
- Singapore Premier League: 2019

=== Individual ===
- Singapore Premier League Top Scorer: 2019
- Singapore Premier League Team of the Year: 2019
