= Helmi Wafiy Ammar Naim =

Bruneian footballer

Helmi Wafiy
Personal information
- Full name: Muhammad Helmi Wafiy bin Muhammad Ammar Naim
- Date of birth: 3 March 1996 (age 30)
- Place of birth: Bandar Seri Begawan, Brunei
- Height: 1.71 m (5 ft 7 in)
- Position: Defender

Team information
- Current team: Jerudong FC
- Number: 17

Youth career
- 2013: Muara Vella

Senior career*
Years	Team	Apps	(Gls)
2014	Majra		
2015	Tabuan Muda		
2016	Wijaya		
2017	Panchor Murai		(3)
2017–2018	Indera		(1)
2018–2020	DPMM	22	(1)
2021–2022	Hoist		(4)
2023	Panchor Murai	1	(0)
2023–2024	Liang Lumut Belait		
2025–	Jerudong	11	(1)

International career^{‡}
2013	Brunei U19	4	(0)
2014	Brunei U21	5	(0)
2015–2017	Brunei U23	13	(0)
2015–2019	Brunei	3	(0)
- * Club domestic league appearances and goals as of 3 November 2026 ‡ National team caps and goals as of 11 October 2022

Muhammad Helmi Wafiy bin Muhammad Ammar Naim, previously known as Suhaimi Anak Sulau (born 3 March 1996) is a Bruneian footballer who plays as a defender for Jerudong FC of the Brunei Super League.

== Club career ==
=== Early career ===
Suhaimi played youth football with Muara Vella FC, and was in Majra FC's books in 2014 when they played only 9 games in the Brunei Super League before withdrawing from the league. For the 2015 season, he played for Tabuan Muda in preparation for the 28th SEA Games held in Singapore. Wijaya FC signed him at the beginning of the 2016 season.

=== Panchor Murai ===
Suhaimi transferred to Panchor Murai FC of the Brunei Premier League in 2017. He scored his first goal against IKLS FC on 14 May.

=== Indera ===
At the conclusion of the Premier League season, he moved to Indera SC for the remaining matches of the 2017 Brunei Super League. He scored his first goal for Indera against former team Wijaya FC on 3 February 2018.

=== DPMM ===
In early February 2018, Brunei's professional club DPMM FC announced the signing of Suhaimi on their website, alongside Haimie Anak Nyaring, Abdul Hariz Herman and Abdul Azizi Ali Rahman. He officially signed to terms on 13 February. Under Brazilian coach Rene Weber, he made his debut on 7 April at left-back in a 4–2 victory against Home United. He swiftly became Weber's first-choice left-back in the team, earning plaudits for his strength in that position.

Suhaimi scored his first goal for DPMM in a 2–2 draw at home against Balestier Khalsa on 7 July 2018.

=== Belait clubs ===
After leaving DPMM in 2020, Suhaimi joined Hoist FT of the Belait District League and scored on his debut. He subsequently moved to Liang Lumut Belait ST and helped his team finish the 2023–24 season in third place, behind Hawa FC and Nelayan FT.

=== Jerudong ===
On 22 November 2025, Helmi debuted for Jerudong FC at the 2025–26 Brunei Super League in a 5–2 defeat at the hands of Kota Ranger FC. In his second appearance against KB on 10 January 2026, Helmi managed to find the back of the net in a 2–2 draw.

== International career ==
=== Youth ===
Suhaimi's first involvement with the national team setup was at the 2013 AFF U-19 Youth Championship held in Indonesia, where Brunei spearheaded by 15-year-old Prince Faiq Bolkiah conceded 30 goals in 5 matches to finish rock bottom of their group. The following year, he was ever-present for Brunei under-21 for their unsuccessful defence of the Hassanal Bolkiah Trophy that Brunei had won in 2012.

Suhaimi played for the under-23s at the 2016 AFC U-23 Championship qualification in March where they lost all three games. Furthermore, two months later, he competed in the 28th SEA Games in Singapore where he managed to play in all 5 matches that Brunei were involved in. He was called up for the 2018 AFC U-23 Championship qualification matches held in Myanmar in July 2017 and played twice, followed by the 2017 SEA Games held in Malaysia where he made three appearances.

=== Senior ===
Suhaimi made his international debut for Brunei on 3 November 2015 in a friendly against Cambodia, which they lost 1–6.

Suhaimi accepted a callup by the national team for the 2022 World Cup qualification matches against Mongolia in June 2019. He was able to start both games due to the absence of Abdul Mu'iz Sisa who had been the regular left-back for Adrian Pennock's DPMM side. A 2–1 win for the national team at the Hassanal Bolkiah National Stadium was not enough for the Wasps to qualify to the next round of the double qualification process for the 2022 World Cup and the 2023 Asian Cup, as the round finished 2–3 on aggregate to Mongolia.

== Honours ==
DPMM FC

- Singapore Premier League: 2019

== Personal life ==
Suhaimi converted to Islam in May 2022, choosing the Islamic name Helmi Wafiy.
