= Wafi Aminuddin =

Bruneian footballer

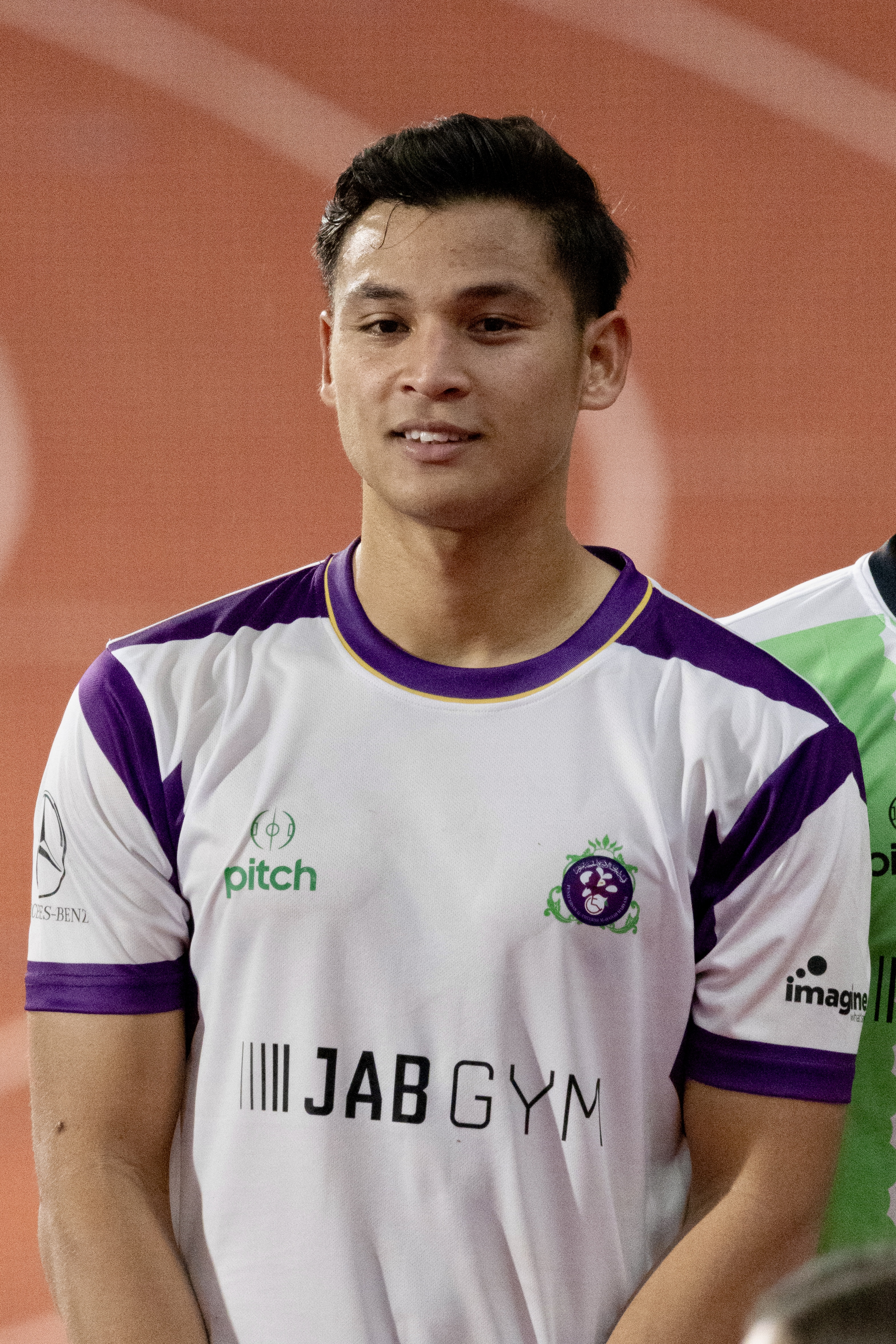
- Wafi Aminuddin in 2024

Personal information
- Full name: Muhammad Wafi bin Aminuddin
- Date of birth: 20 September 2000 (age 26)
- Place of birth: Bandar Seri Begawan, Brunei
- Height: 1.71 m (5 ft 7 in)
- Position: Defender

Team information
- Current team: Kasuka FC
- Number: 6

Youth career
- 2005–2012: PIP
- 2014–2018: Tabuan Muda
- 2018: Tokyo Institute of Technology

Senior career*
Years	Team	Apps	(Gls)
2016	Tabuan U17		
2017–2018	Tabuan Muda 'A'		(1)
2019	DPMM II	6	(2)
2019–2023	DPMM	8	(0)
2024	Kasuka	8	(0)
2025	DPMM	1	(0)
2025–	Kasuka	7	(0)

International career^{‡}
2014	Brunei U14	5	(0)
2015–2016	Brunei U16	9	(0)
2017–2018	Brunei U19	10	(0)
2018	Brunei U21	0	(0)
2019–2022	Brunei U23	10	(0)
2017–	Brunei	20	(1)
- * Club domestic league appearances and goals as of 18 November 2026 ‡ National team caps and goals as of 30 September 2026

Muhammad Wafi bin Aminuddin (born 20 September 2000) is a Bruneian footballer who plays as a defender for Kasuka FC of the Brunei Super League as well as the Brunei national team.

== Club career ==
Born to a footballing family, Wafi began training with youth scheme Projek Ikan Pusu ever since he was five years old. He attended Maktab Sains as a schoolboy. He was already a youth international by the age of 14, and was even invited to a football camp in Munich, Germany courtesy of Allianz two years later.

Wafi began his league career with the Tabuan Muda national youth setup, captaining the under-17 club side in the 2016 Brunei Premier League followed by the 'A' team that played in the 2017-18 Brunei Super League. After a training stint at the Tokyo Institute of Technology in Japan in late 2018, Wafi joined DPMM FC initially as a youth player to compete in the 2019 Brunei Premier League. After the academy side comfortably claimed the league title, Wafi's performances as captain impressed new head coach Adrian Pennock enough to place him in the first team.

Wafi made his Singapore Premier League debut in the 1–7 victory against Balestier Khalsa on 13 April 2019.

Playing domestically in the Brunei leagues since 2020, Wafi played at the 2022 Brunei FA Cup and won the competition on 4 December of that year.

On 19 March 2023 in a 1–3 defeat against Geylang International, Wafi was stretchered off in the second half after an awkward landing, which was later revealed to be an anterior cruciate ligament injury alongside a meniscus tear on his right knee which ruled him out for the rest of the season. He was released by DPMM at the start of the 2024–25 season.

In the middle of 2024, Wafi signed for Kasuka, where his brothers Afi and Bazli are already playing. He made his competitive debut in the first leg of the 2024–25 Shopee Cup qualifying matches on 17 July against Shan United of Myanmar, which ended in a 1–1 draw. He also made the starting lineup in the second leg a week later, this time suffering a 3–1 defeat which eliminated Kasuka from the Shopee Cup.

After spending a half-season with Kasuka at the 2024–25 Brunei Super League, Wafi returned to DPMM FC in December 2024. He made his first DPMM appearance since re-signing in a 0–1 loss to Tampines Rovers on 23 February 2025. He was released again at the end of the season.

Wafi returned to Kasuka for a second spell after his DPMM release, and featured for them at the qualifying rounds of the Shopee Cup as well as the AFC Challenge League. He played five times in the league as Kasuka finished in second place behind Indera SC.

== Career statistics ==
=== Club ===
As of 18 November 2026

Club	Season	League			Cup		Other		Total	
Club	Season	Division	Apps	Goals	Apps	Goals	Apps	Goals	Apps	Goals
DPMM	2019	Singapore Premier League	3	0	0	0	0	0	3	0
DPMM	2020	Singapore Premier League	0	0	0	0	0	0	0	0
DPMM	2021	Brunei Super League	2	0	0	0	0	0	2	0
DPMM	2022	Brunei Super League	0	0	7	1	0	0	7	1
DPMM	2023	Singapore Premier League	3	0	0	0	0	0	3	0
DPMM	DPMM total		8	0	7	1	0	0	15	1
Kasuka	2024–25	Brunei Super League	8	0	0	0	2 (Note: Appearance(s) in ASEAN Club Championship)	0	10	0
DPMM	2024–25	Singapore Premier League	1	0	0	0	0	0	1	0
Kasuka	2025–26	Brunei Super League	5	0	0	0	3 (Note: Appearance(s) in AFC Challenge League)	0	8	0
Kasuka	2026–27	Brunei Super League	2	0	0	0	1	0	3	0
Kasuka	Kasuka total		7	0	0	0	4	0	11	0
Career total			24	0	7	1	6	0	37	1

== Honours ==
DPMM FC

- Brunei Premier League: 2018–19
- Singapore Premier League: 2019
- Brunei FA Cup: 2022

Kasuka FC

- Brunei Super League: 2024–25

== International goals ==
No.	Date	Venue	Opponent	Score	Result	Competition
1.	5 November 2022	Track & Field Sports Complex, Bandar Seri Begawan, Brunei	Timor-Leste	5–2	6–2	2022 AFF Championship qualification

== Personal life ==
Wafi's brothers are all footballers. Afi is an established Brunei international and plays for Kasuka FC. Ulfi appeared for Brunei youth teams and currently plays futsal with Street United. The youngest brother Bazli is a Brunei under-23 international who plays for Wijaya FC.

Outside football, Wafi is a sales executive for BYD Auto.
