= Charlie Clough =

English footballer (born 1990)

Personal information
- Full name: Charles David Clough
- Date of birth: 4 September 1990 (age 36)
- Place of birth: Taunton, England
- Height: 6 ft 2 in (1.88 m)
- Position: Centre-back

Team information
- Current team: Lamphun Warriors
- Number: 23

Youth career
- 2006: Bristol Academy of Sport

Senior career*
Years	Team	Apps	(Gls)
2007–2012	Bristol Rovers	3	(0)
2008	→ Mangotsfield United (loan)	10	(0)
2009	→ Chippenham Town (loan)	10	(0)
2010	→ Newport County (loan)	2	(0)
2011	→ Weymouth (loan)	5	(1)
2011	→ Bath City (loan)	11	(2)
2011	→ Bath City (loan)	12	(1)
2012	→ AFC Telford United (loan)	0	(0)
2012–2013	Dorchester Town	43	(10)
2013–2015	Sutton United	52	(7)
2015–2017	Forest Green Rovers	83	(7)
2017–2018	Barnet	54	(1)
2018	Sutton United	22	(2)
2019–2021	DPMM	24	(3)
2021–2023	Nakhon Ratchasima	40	(4)
2023–2025	Port	17	(1)
2024	→ Chonburi (loan)	12	(1)
2025	→ Sisaket United (loan)	15	(2)
2025–	Lamphun Warriors	26	(1)
- * Club domestic league appearances and goals as of 9 September 2026

Charles David Clough (born 4 September 1990) is an English professional footballer who plays as a centre-back for Thai League 1 club Lamphun Warriors.

== Career ==
=== Bristol Rovers ===
Originally from Taunton in Somerset, Clough was admitted into the Bristol Rovers youth set-up, based at the Bristol Academy of Sport, and was promoted to the first-team squad in the summer of 2007. His Football League debut, aged 17, came in a League One match against Brighton & Hove Albion at the Memorial Stadium on 26 April 2008 as a substitute in the 68th minute.

At the start of the 2008–09 season he was sent to Mangotsfield United on a month's loan to gain some first team experience, with the loan later extended into a second month. In September 2010, he joined Newport County on a one-month loan. In January 2011, he joined struggling Southern Premier League club Weymouth on a month-long loan.

On 28 February 2011, he joined Bath City on an initial loan period of a month. He made his debut for Bath City on 1 March 2011 in a 5–1 away defeat against Rushden & Diamonds. He was recalled from his loan period on 28 April 2011 having scored two goals in eleven appearances. He re-joined Bath on loan later that year, when they signed him in a month-long emergency deal. In March 2012, he joined A.F.C. Telford United on loan.

In December 2011, he was told he would be allowed to leave Bristol Rovers alongside teammate Ben Swallow.

=== Dorchester Town ===
In the summer of 2012, Clough joined Dorchester Town, signing a permanent deal. On 4 November 2012, he was a part of the Dorchester side that earned a shock 1–0 win over Plymouth Argyle in the FA Cup first round.

In April 2013, he was named the Dorset Echo Player of the Year at the club. In September 2013, Dorchester 'reluctantly' agreed to a request from Clough to have him put on the transfer list.

=== Sutton United ===
On 12 September 2013, he moved to Conference South league rivals Sutton United who paid an undisclosed fee for his signature. He scored on 9 November 2013 in a 4–1 away defeat against Conference National Kidderminster Harriers in the first round of the FA Cup.

He was made captain at Sutton United amid interest from clubs at a higher level. During the 2013–14 season, he helped the club to the Conference South play-off semi-finals where they lost against Dover Athletic who would go on to win promotion to the Conference National.

=== Forest Green Rovers ===
On 4 January 2015, it was confirmed he would be joining Conference National club Forest Green Rovers for an undisclosed fee. He made his Forest Green debut on 17 January 2015, playing the full 90 minutes in a 2–1 away win against Braintree Town. He scored his first goal for the club on 21 February 2015 in a 3–0 home win over former club AFC Telford United. He helped Forest Green into the 2014–15 Conference National play-offs for the first time, playing in both legs of a semi-final defeat against former club Bristol Rovers.

He scored his first goal of the 2015–16 season in stoppage time to earn Forest Green a 2–1 win over Macclesfield Town on 30 January 2016. Later that season, he helped the club reach the 2015–16 National League play-off final at Wembley Stadium, and played the full 90 minutes in a game that ended in a 3–1 defeat to Grimsby Town. It was confirmed the next day that he had agreed a contract extension to stay at the club.

In November 2016, he signed a new contract with Forest Green, agreeing a deal until the summer of 2019.

=== Barnet ===
On 23 January 2017, Clough signed for Barnet for an undisclosed fee. He was released by Barnet at the end of the 2017–18 season.

=== Return to Sutton ===
Clough re-joined Sutton for the 2018–19 season.

=== DPMM ===
Clough left Sutton in December 2018 and joined Bruneian club DPMM for the 2019 season, joining up with his former manager at Forest Green, Adrian Pennock. He scored his first goal for the Bruneian side in a 1–1 draw away to Young Lions FC on 7 August. DPMM were crowned champions of the Singapore Premier League on his first season at the club. Clough played a huge part in the title-winning campaign, his club claiming the joint-best defensive record of the league after 24 matches.

On 9 November 2020, Clough announced on his social media accounts that he has signed for a third year with DPMM FC. With his team playing domestically for the 2021 season, he made his debut against BAKES FC on 27 June, scoring five goals in a 16–1 rout. Clough left DPMM at the year's end.

=== Nakhon Ratchasima ===
On 9 December 2021, Clough joined Thai League 1 side Nakhon Ratchasima. On 16 April 2022, he scored his first league goal in a 1–0 win over Ratchaburi FC. In an interview with the Somerset County Gazette, Clough is settling down and enjoying life in Thailand, saying his playing style suit the league.

=== Port FC ===
On 30 May 2023, Clough moved to another Thai side, joining Port. He scored his first goal for Port in a 0–4 away victory to Police Tero on 11 February 2024.

In June 2024, Clough joined recently relegated Thai League 2 club Chonburi on a season loan. On 16 December 2024, Clough announced that his loan at Chonburi had come to an end. He later joined Sisaket United on loan.

== Career statistics ==
As of 9 September 2026

Club	Season	League			National Cup		League Cup		Other		Total	
Club	Season	Division	Apps	Goals	Apps	Goals	Apps	Goals	Apps	Goals	Apps	Goals
Bristol Rovers	2007–08	League One	1	0	0	0	0	0	0	0	1	0
Bristol Rovers	2008–09	League One	0	0	0	0	0	0	0	0	0	0
Bristol Rovers	2009–10	League One	0	0	0	0	0	0	0	0	0	0
Bristol Rovers	2010–11	League One	2	0	0	0	0	0	0	0	2	0
Bristol Rovers	2011–12	League Two	0	0	0	0	0	0	0	0	0	0
Bristol Rovers	Bristol Rovers total		3	0	0	0	0	0	0	0	3	0
Mangotsfield United (loan)	2008–09	Southern Premier	10	0	0	0	—		0	0	10	0
Chippenham Town (loan)	2009–10	Southern Premier	10	0	0	0	—		0	0	10	0
Newport County (loan)	2010–11	Conference Premier	2	0	1	0	—		0	0	3	0
Weymouth (loan)	2010–11	Southern Premier	5	1	0	0	—		0	0	5	1
Bath City (loan)	2010–11	Conference Premier	11	2	0	0	—		0	0	11	2
Bath City (loan)	2011–12	Conference Premier	12	1	2	0	—		0	0	14	1
Bath City (loan)	Bath City total		23	3	2	0	—		0	0	25	3
Telford United (loan)	2011–12	Conference Premier	0	0	0	0	—		0	0	0	0
Dorchester Town	2012–13	Conference South	37	10	3	1	—		2 (Note: Appearances in the FA Trophy)	1	42	12
Dorchester Town	2013–14	Conference South	6	0	0	0	—		0	0	6	0
Dorchester Town	Dorchester Town total		43	10	3	1	—		2	1	48	12
Sutton United	2013–14	Conference South	30	2	3	1	—		2 (Note: Appearances in the Conference South play-offs)	0	35	3
Sutton United	2014–15	Conference South	22	5	0	0	—		1	0	23	5
Sutton United	Sutton United total		52	7	3	1	—		3	0	58	8
Forest Green Rovers	2014–15	Conference Premier	19	2	0	0	—		2 (Note: Appearances in the Conference Premier play-offs)	0	21	2
Forest Green Rovers	2015–16	National League	39	1	2	0	—		4 (Note: Three appearances in the National League play-offs, one appearance in the FA Trophy)	0	44	1
Forest Green Rovers	2016–17	National League	25	4	0	0	—		0	0	25	4
Forest Green Rovers	Forest Green total		83	7	2	0	—		5	0	90	7
Barnet	2016–17	League Two	18	1	0	0	0	0	0	0	18	1
Barnet	2017–18	League Two	36	0	1	0	2	0	2 (Note: Two appearances in the EFL Trophy)	0	41	0
Barnet	Barnet total		54	1	1	0	2	0	2	0	59	1
Sutton United	2018–19	National League	22	2	3	0	0	0	2 (Note: One appearance in the Scottish Challenge Cup, one appearance in the FA Trophy)	0	27	2
DPMM	2019	Singapore Premier League	23	2	5	1	0	0	0	0	28	3
DPMM	2020	Singapore Premier League	1	1	0	0	0	0	0	0	1	1
DPMM	2021	Brunei Super League	5	8	0	0	0	0	0	0	5	8
DPMM	DPMM FC total		29	11	5	1	0	0	0	0	34	12
Nakhon Ratchasima	2021–22	Thai League 1	12	1	4	1	1	0	0	0	17	2
Nakhon Ratchasima	2022–23	Thai League 1	28	3	4	2	0	0	0	0	31	5
Nakhon Ratchasima	Nakhon Ratchasima total		40	4	8	3	1	0	0	0	49	7
Port	2023–24	Thai League 1	17	1	0	0	1	0	1 (Note: Appearances in the AFC Champions League)	0	19	1
Chonburi (loan)	2024–25	Thai League 2	12	1	1	0	0	0	0	0	13	1
Sisaket United (loan)	2024–25	Thai League 2	15	2	0	0	0	0	0	0	15	2
Lamphun Warriors	2025–26	Thai League 1	25	1	4	0	1	0	0	0	30	1
Lamphun Warriors	2026–27	Thai League 1	1	0	0	0	0	0	0	0	1	0
Lamphun Warriors	Lamphun Warriors total		26	1	3	0	1	0	0	0	31	1
Career total			446	51	33	6	5	0	15	1	499	58

== Honours ==
Brunei DPMM

- Singapore Premier League: 2019

Individual

- Singapore Premier League Team of the Year: 2019
