= Kadir Yahaya =

Singaporean footballer

Personal information
- Full name: Abdul Kadir Yahaya
- Date of birth: 15 February 1968 (age 58)
- Place of birth: Singapore
- Position: Defender

Senior career*
Years	Team	Apps	(Gls)
1987–2001	Geylang International		

International career
1993–1999	Singapore	18+	(0+)

Managerial career
- 2000–2005: National Football Academy
- 2006–2009: Pelita Jaya (Assistant coach)
- 2010: National Football Academy
- 2012: LionsXII (Assistant coach)
- 2012–2022: St. Joseph's Institution
- 2013: Singapore U-23 (Assistant coach)
- 2019–2020: Tampines Rovers (Advisor)
- 2022–: BG Pathum United (Head of youth)
- * Club domestic league appearances and goals

Abdul Kadir Yahaya (born 15 February 1968) is a Singaporean retired footballer. He is currently the Head of youth at Thai League 1 club, BG Pathum United.

Kadir had spent most of his playing career playing for Geylang International and also spent his time into the development of future footballers as a coach.

== Coaching career ==
=== National Football Academy ===
Kadir was the coach of the National Football Academy from 2000 to 2005.

=== Pelita Jaya ===
In 2007, Kadir joined FandI Ahmad as his assistant coach at Indonesian club, Pelita Jaya until 2009.

=== National Football Academy ===
In February 2010, Kadir became the coach of the Singapore 2010 Youth Olympics football team after former coach David Sivalingam died of a heart attack in November 2009. The team went on to win 4–1 against Montenegro with goals from Hanafi Akbar and Ammirul Emmran to clinch the bronze medal in the Youth Olympics.

=== LionsXII ===
In 2012, Kadir reunited with FandI Ahmad as his assistant coach at LionsXII for the 2012 Malaysia Super League season.

=== St. Joseph's Institution ===
After he left the team, Kadir joined St. Joseph's Institution as the head coach in 2012. He spent 10 years at the school, coaching the various A, B and C Division teams and had won various zonal titles with the school. While coaching at the school, Kadir had help developed Singapore national footballer Jacob Mahler.

=== Singapore U-23 ===
Kadir joined Aide Iskandar as his assistant coach for Singapore U-23 in the 2015 SEA Games.

=== Tampines Rovers ===
In December 2018, Kadir was appointed as an adviser to Tampines Rovers for the 2019 season.

BG Pathum United

On 3 December 2022, Kadir signed a two-year contract as the head of youth football at Thai League 1 club, BG Pathum United.

=== Football Association of Singapore ===
Kadir returned to Singapore in 2025 as the director of football at Football Association of Singapore's national project, Unleash the Roar!.

== Honours ==
=== Advisor ===
Tampines Rovers

- Singapore Cup: 2019
