= Abdul Aziz Tamit =

Bruneian footballer

Abdul Aziz
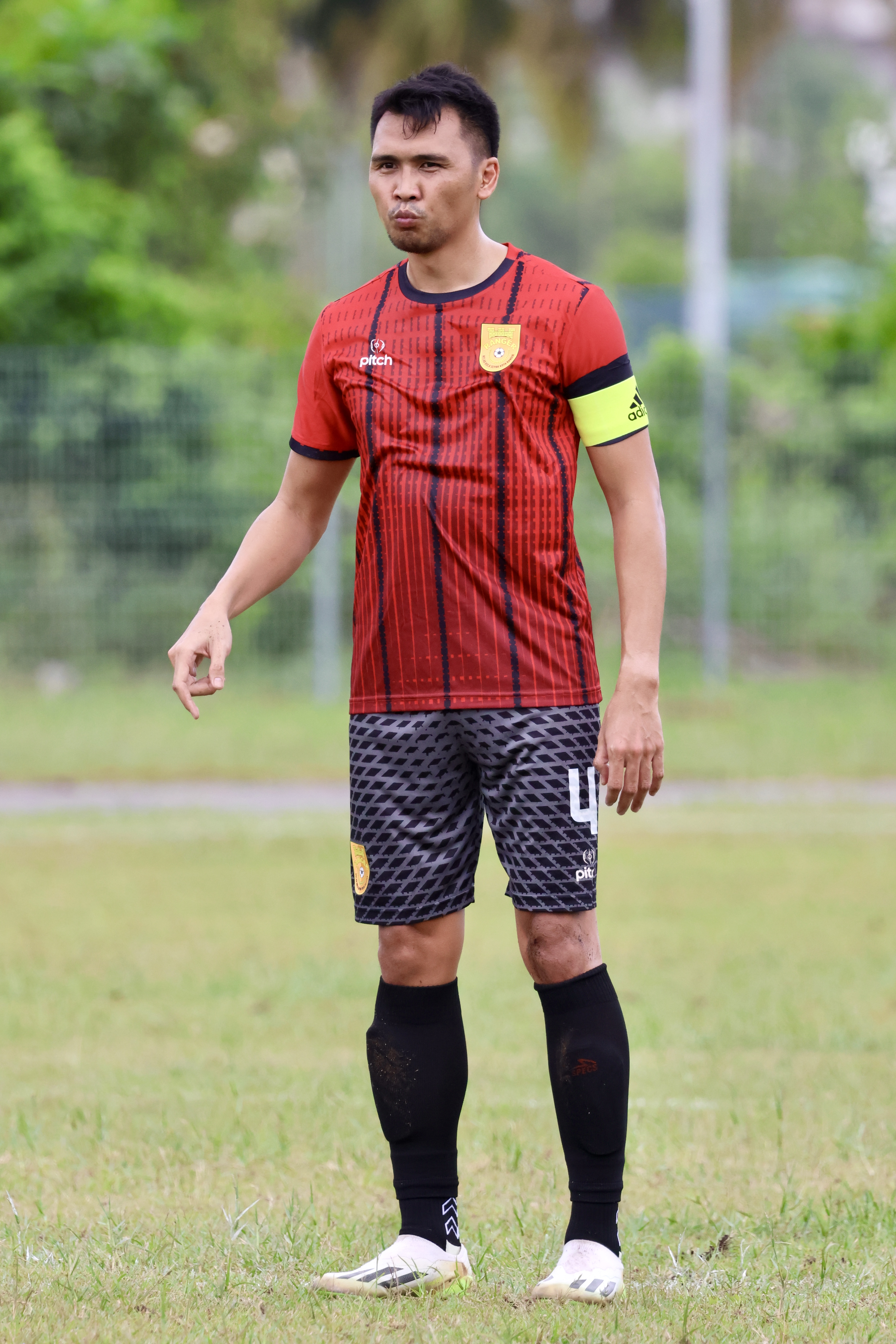
- Abdul Aziz with Kota Ranger in 2024

Personal information
- Full name: Abdul Aziz bin Tamit
- Date of birth: 7 September 1989 (age 37)
- Place of birth: Brunei
- Height: 1.83 m (6 ft 0 in)
- Position: Defender

Team information
- Current team: DPMM FC II
- Number: 21

Senior career*
Years	Team	Apps	(Gls)
2009–2016	DPMM	40	(1)
2010	→ Indera (loan)		
2011	→ AM Gunners (loan)		
2017–2018	Kasuka		(4)
2018–2022	DPMM	24	(1)
2023	Kasuka	1	(0)
2024–2026	Kota Ranger	17	(3)
2026–	DPMM II	4	(0)

International career^{‡}
2007	Brunei U21	1	(0)
2014	Brunei	1	(0)
- * Club domestic league appearances and goals as of 3 November 2026 ‡ National team caps and goals as of 14 March 2016

Abdul Aziz bin Haji Tamit (born 7 September 1989) is a Bruneian footballer who plays for DPMM FC II as a defender.

== Club career ==
Abdul Aziz played for Brunei DPMM FC from 2009, when the club joined the S.League of Singapore after leaving the Malaysia Super League, until the end of 2016. His debut came in a 2–0 defeat to Home United on 10 May 2009. He went on loan to Indera SC and AM Gunners for the duration of the two-year FIFA suspension of Brunei.

Returning to DPMM in 2012, Abdul Aziz was greatly involved with the first-team in DPMM's 2013 campaign and also in 2014, but could not displace either Brian McLean or Boris Raspudić in 2015. After the latter's exit due to a reduction in the league's quota of foreign imports in 2016, he was back in contention for a starting place in the DPMM backline. Nevertheless, he only appeared in 6 games and was released at the end of the season.

Abdul Aziz joined Kasuka FC in 2017, where he was reunited with Sairol Sahari who is currently assistant coach for the club. He scored his first goal against Wijaya FC on 19 May.

After an impressive 2017 season with four goals from the back, Abdul Aziz was re-signed by DPMM FC in 2018. A stellar pre-season convinced new coach Renê Weber to place him as a starter, and he duly replied with a goal in his first game back at the club, which was a 4–2 win over Home United FC on 7 April. Abdul Aziz made 20 appearances under Weber as DPMM finished third in the league.

After failing to make an appearance in the 2019 season, Abdul Aziz was deregistered to make way for the returning Adi Said. However he was re-registered in the following campaign, taking back the number 21 shirt from the departed Adi.

In early 2023, Abdul Aziz transferred to Kasuka FC. He gained a championship medal at the conclusion of the league that year. He moved to Kota Ranger FC the following year and became their captain at the start of the 2025–26 season. He celebrated his appointment with a goal against Rimba Star in a 3–2 win on 3 October 2025.

== International career ==
Abdul Aziz appeared once for the Brunei under-21s at the 2007 Hassanal Bolkiah Trophy, which was a 3–1 defeat to Myanmar. His international debut came at the 2014 AFF Suzuki Cup qualifiers when the majority of the national side was represented by his club DPMM. Against Timor-Leste on 12 October, he played the full 90 minutes in a 4–2 loss.

== Honours ==
DPMM FC

- S.League: 2015
- Singapore League Cup (3): 2009, 2012, 2014
- Brunei FA Cup: 2022

Kasuka FC

- Brunei Super League: 2023
