= Abdul Mu'iz Sisa =

Bruneian footballer

Abdul Mu'iz
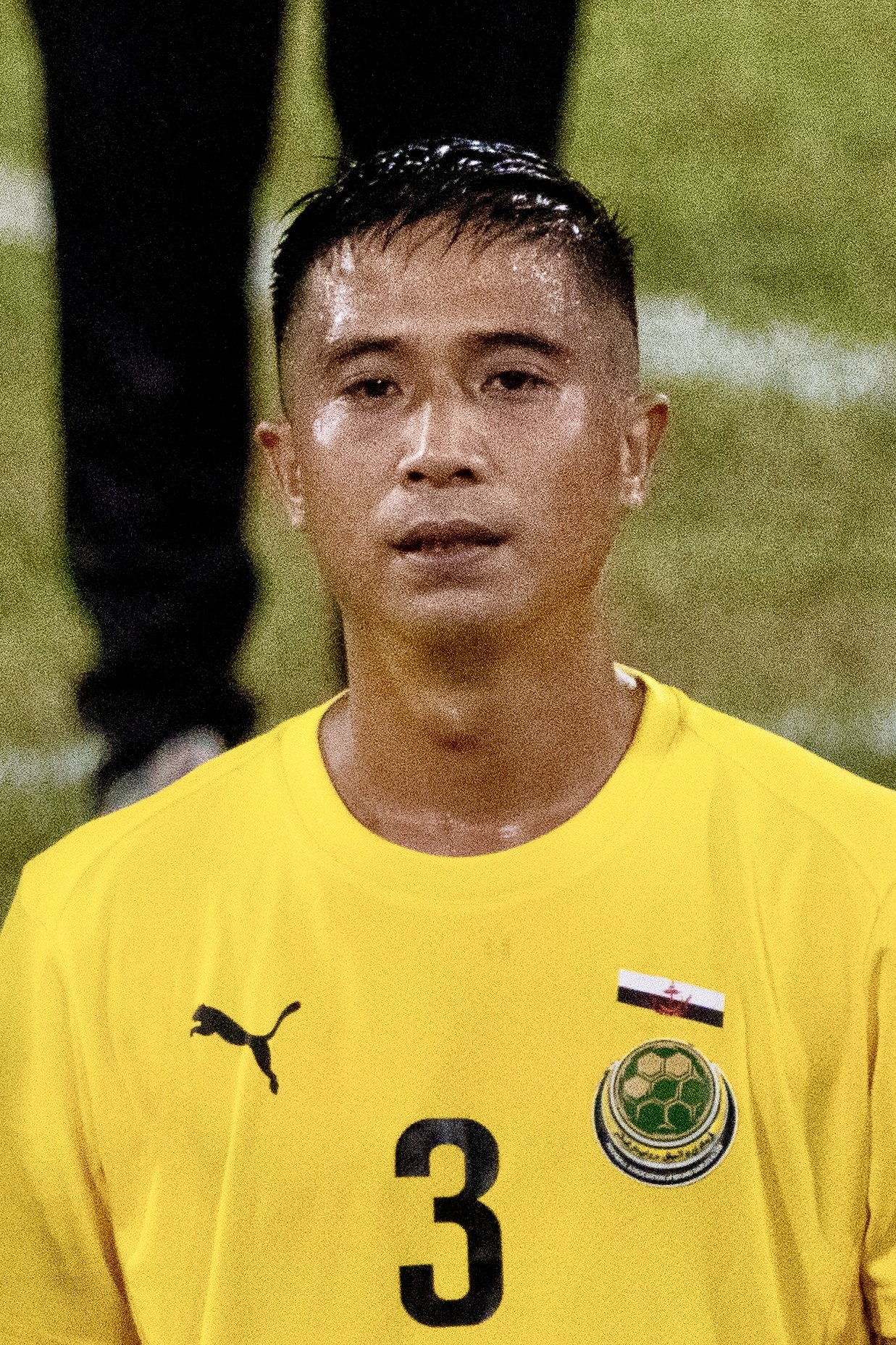
- Abdul Mu'iz with Brunei in 2024

Personal information
- Full name: Abdul Mu'iz bin Sisa
- Date of birth: 20 April 1991 (age 35)
- Place of birth: Brunei
- Position: Left-back

Team information
- Current team: Kasuka FC
- Number: 4

Youth career
- Indera

Senior career*
Years	Team	Apps	(Gls)
2008–2016	Indera		
2016–2025	DPMM	63	(0)
2025–	Kasuka	11	(0)

International career^{‡}
2006–2007	Brunei U18		
2007–2012	Brunei U21	6	(0)
2013	Brunei U23	4	(0)
2015–	Brunei	22	(1)
- * Club domestic league appearances and goals as of 18 November 2026 ‡ National team caps and goals as of 31 March 2026

Abdul Mu'iz bin Sisa (born 20 April 1991) is a Bruneian footballer who plays as a left-sided full-back for Kasuka FC of the Brunei Super League. He won the two league championships with Indera SC in 2012–13 and 2014, afterwards winning the Singapore Premier League with DPMM FC in 2019.

== Club career ==
=== Indera ===
Abdul Mu'iz rose through the ranks from the youth system of Indera SC. He appeared regularly at left back for Indera starting from the 2007-08 season, winning the Bruneian league championship twice and the Piala Sumbangsih once.

=== DPMM ===
Abdul Mu'iz was granted the opportunity to play for Brunei's sole professional side DPMM FC in 2016 after a season-ending injury to Sairol Sahari forced the Gegar Gegar men to look for a local left-back to provide additional cover to the position. Already an established Bruneian international, he joined in June 2016 after a successful trial.

Abdul Mu'iz made his DPMM debut on 26 September 2016 against Young Lions in a 5–3 win. He was largely a backup to Najib Tarif in his stint there.

On 4 December 2022, Abdul Mu'iz played in the final of the 2022 Brunei FA Cup where he was taken off injured at the half-hour mark. His team won the match 2–1 against Kasuka FC, bringing Abdul Mu'iz his first FA Cup winner's medal. After nine years with the royalty-owned team, he was released at the end of the 2024–25 season.

=== Kasuka ===
Abdul Mu'iz trained with Kasuka starting from the middle of 2025 and officially joined the club in October, debuting against Rimba Star on the 31st. He made eight appearances as Kasuka finished in second place in the league.

== International career ==
=== Youth ===
Abdul Mu'iz started his international career with the under-21 side of the national team. He was an unused squad player for the 2007 Hassanal Bolkiah Trophy, but appeared in every match for the 2012 edition, winning the trophy on home soil.

Abdul Mu'iz next laced up with the under-23 team for the 27th SEA Games held in Myanmar in December 2013. Brunei lost every game to finish rock bottom of their group.

=== Senior ===
Abdul Mu'iz was selected for the 2018 World Cup qualifying First Round for AFC two-legged clash against Chinese Taipei in March 2015. He started both legs in a 1–2 aggregate loss. He appeared in friendlies against Singapore and Cambodia later that year, scoring his first international goal with a chip in the former game.

Abdul Mu'iz was selected by the national team for the 2018 AFF Suzuki Cup qualification matches against Timor-Leste in early September. He came on in the second half of the first leg which was a 3–1 loss in Kuala Lumpur on 1 September. He was a starter at left-back in the return leg at Hassanal Bolkiah National Stadium the following week, the match resulted in a 1–0 win which was not enough to send Brunei to the group stages of the Suzuki Cup.

In June 2019 Abdul Mu'iz was to be recalled to the national team by Robbie Servais for the 2022 World Cup qualification matches, but he decided to decline due to unspecified reasons.

Abdul Mu'iz was selected for the Wasps for the two-legged 2022 AFF Mitsubishi Electric Cup qualifying matches against Timor-Leste in Bandar Seri Begawan in early November 2022. He started the second match which was a 1–0 loss to Brunei but still advanced to the group stages via a 6–3 aggregate win. He played twice in the tournament against the Philippines and Cambodia, both games ending 5–1 to the opponent.

On 11 September 2023, Abdul Mu'iz started the away game against Hong Kong which finished 10–0 to the home side. He was subsequently selected for the 2026 World Cup qualification matches against Indonesia the following month, and started the first leg in a 6–0 loss. The round ended with Brunei's elimination from the 2026 World Cup in a 0–12 aggregate.

In September 2024, Mu'iz was selected to play for the Wasps at the play-off round for the 2027 AFC Asian Cup qualification matches scheduled the following year, involving a two-legged tie against Macau. He started both matches and played a big part in Brunei's two victories against the Macau selection, emerging victorious 4–0 on aggregate. Then in October 2024, he made two substitute appearances for Brunei at the 2024 ASEAN Championship qualification, where the Wasps were eliminated 0–1 on aggregate. The following month, he took the field in a 11–0 drubbing by Russia at an away friendly.

After serving a year-long suspension from the national team, Mu'iz returned to the national side in the 2027 Asian Cup qualification match against Lebanon on 18 November 2025 at home in Bandar Seri Begawan, coming on in the second half in a 0–3 defeat. On 31 March 2026 in the same competition, he was also a substitute in a 2–1 defeat away to Bhutan.

=== International goals ===
Scores and results list Brunei's goal tally first.

No	Date	Venue	Opponent	Score	Result	Competition
1.	6 June 2015	Jurong West Sports and Recreation Centre, Jurong West, Singapore	Singapore	1–2	1–5	Friendly

== Honours ==
=== Team ===
Indera SC

- Brunei Super League (2): 2012–13, 2014

DPMM FC

- Singapore Premier League: 2019
- Brunei FA Cup: 2022

=== International ===
Brunei national under-21 football team

- Hassanal Bolkiah Trophy: 2012

=== Individual ===
- Meritorious Service Medal (PJK; 2012)
