= Jerudong Park =

Amusement Park in Brunei

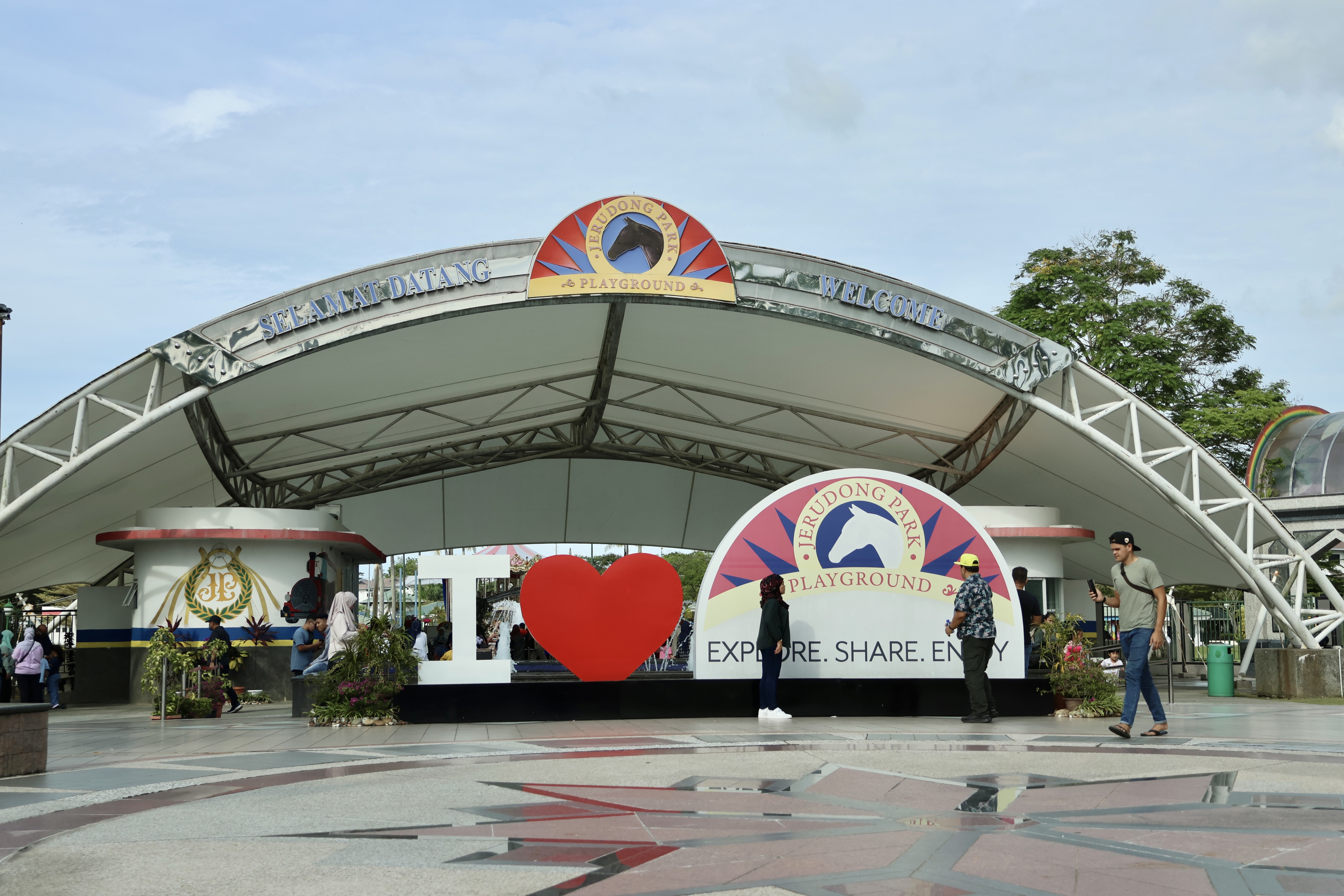
- Jerudong Park in 2022

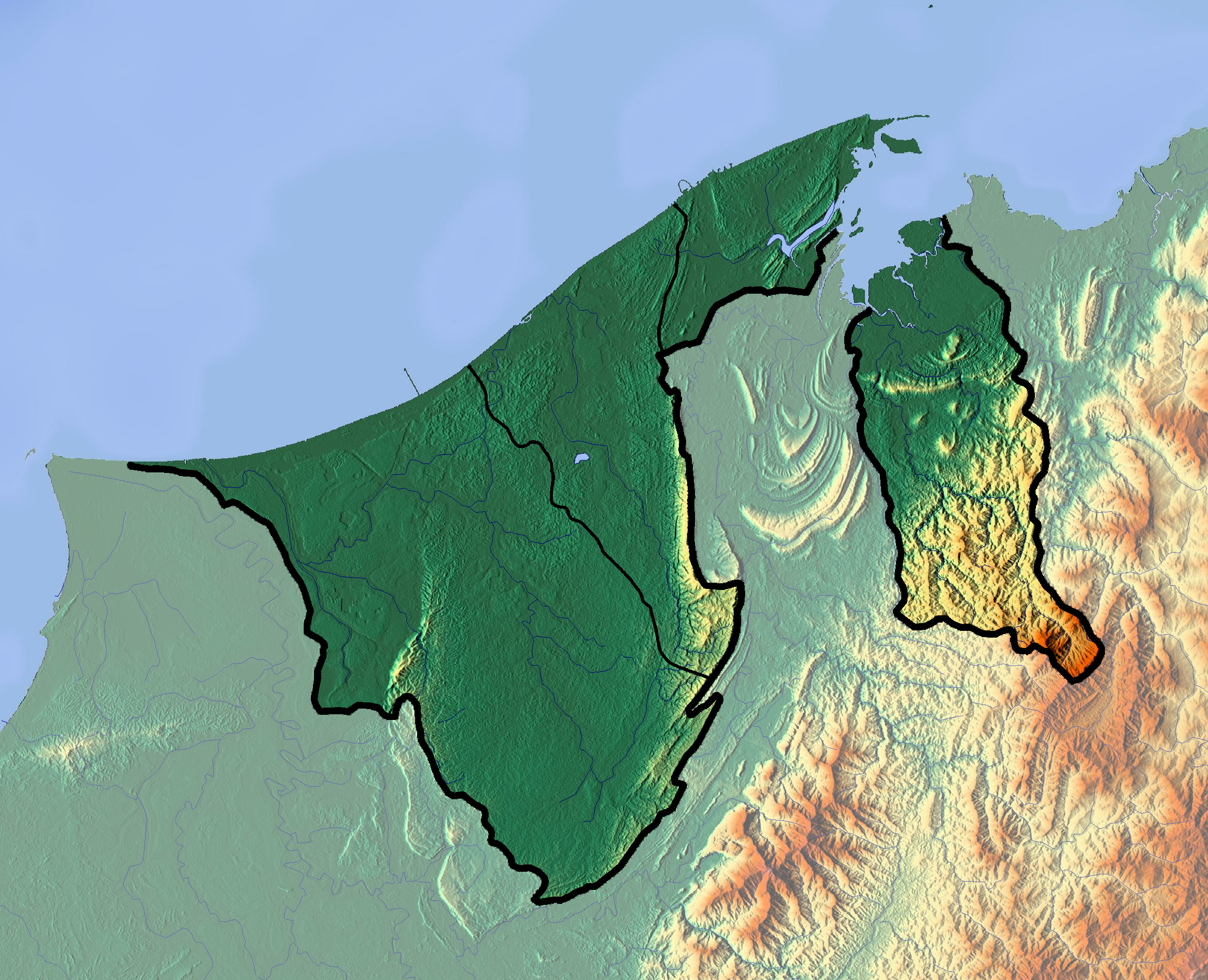
- Location within Southeast Asia Location within Borneo Location within Brunei
- Interactive map of Jerudong Park
- Location: Jerudong, Brunei-Muara, Brunei
- Coordinates: 4°56′13″N 114°50′06″E
- Status: Operating
- Opened: 1994; 32 years ago
- Owner: Brunei Government
- Operated by: The Jerudong Park Playground & Country Club
- Theme: Exploration & Adventure
- Slogan: Explore, Share & Enjoy
- Website: Jerudong Park official website

Jerudong Park is an amusement park in Jerudong, Brunei-Muara District, Brunei. It is the largest and most expensive amusement park in Southeast Asia, built and funded by the Brunei Government for $500 billion.

The Park began in design in the early 1990s, designed by an Australian, Perth-based Architecture and Landscape design firm. The same firm designed the "Crystal Arch" or the colloquially referred "Diamond Roundabout" at the entry to Istana Nurul Izzah, near Kampung Jerudong. During its first few years of operation, the park was completely free, with no admission fees and free rides. In 2009, it was reported that the number of visitors and tourists had dropped significantly. The owners introduced a one-time B$15 admission fee and a ride ticketing system.

Currently, the theme park has reduced its footprint to Phase 1 and 2, the original Playground. It has revised its ride admission with a new ticket card system. The park is once again free entry to the general public with a fee to use a ride or other attraction. An $8 ticket card has 4 slots and 1 free slot (effectively allowing one guest to use 5 rides/attractions - or 2 guests to use two rides with one extra). The $10 ticket card has 5 slots plus 3 free slots (which means a guest can use 8 rides attractions and so on).

== History ==
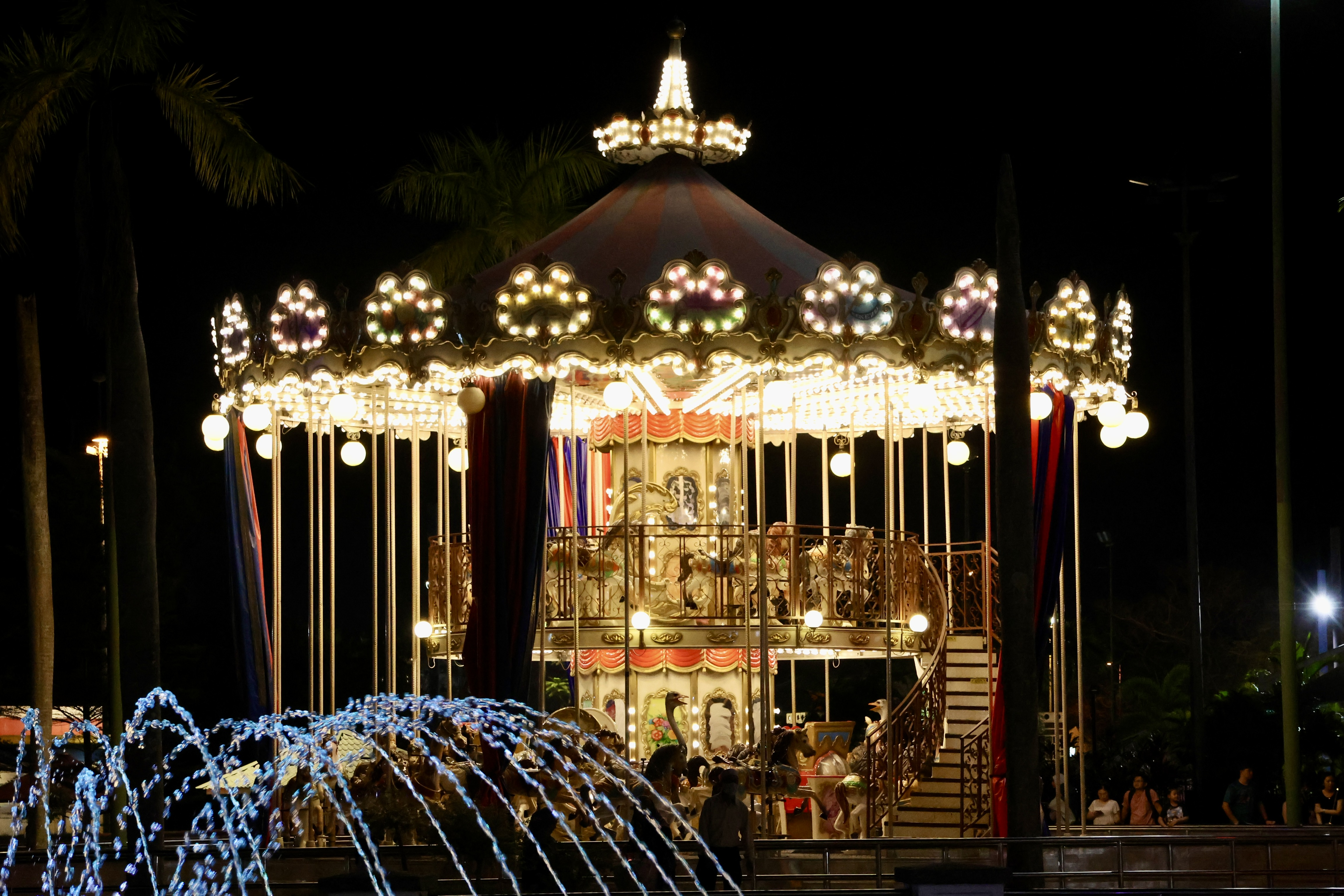
Jerudong Park Carousel at night.

Jerudong Park first opened in 1994.

In August 2006, Jerudong Park began to implement a revitalization program. It started with the launching of the GIGGLES led by their Manager Mr. Wilhelm Bayona, their in-house entertainment team. The team is composed of seven entertainers from the Philippines with various artistic and entertainment skills. The team specialised in family entertainment programs and activities that appealed to school children and schools. This served as a means of regenerating interest in the park. In December, management began a special program on the weekends featuring local artists as the main performers. The program, called Family Night, featured singers, magicians, and dancers who hails from Brunei. The program attracted more than 6,000 people on a single evening.

In 2007, the Park became the venue for a series of activities called Kids' Day. Although the main target was children, it drew families as well because of the "family" factor - the games involved adults such as moms and dads as well. The GIGGLES also began appearing regularly during activities at the Mall and around the country at shopping centers. By the end of 2007, the Giggles had made appearances in schools, public events, and party functions.

In late 2008, JPCC launched its Family Concert Nights (later renamed "Local is Best - Family Entertainment Night") featuring local talents. The program's goal was to provide local artists a family friendly venue to perform and create an audience for their music. The shows are reviewed and approved by a Censorship Board.

On December 12, 2009, JPCC Management introduced a new ticket system. Entrance to the Playground was made free, and guests who wanted to use the attractions had the option to buy an $8 "4 plus 1 ride" ticket, and a $10 "5 plus 3 ride" ticket.

By the end of 2010, attendance to the park was up to 144,000 people annually. This figures are based on the actual park admittance and ticket sales.

The park underwent an internal remodelling in 2011. The park was reopened on March 19, 2011 with new family oriented attractions including a type of bumper car and pedal boats, an electric train, and scooters. That month also saw a record high of over 70,000 visitors.

A fire broke out at the Jerudong Park Food Court (Brunei's largest food court) near midnight on the December 17, 2021. 24 units in Phase 2 of the food court were destroyed. The fire took 30 minutes to be extinguished by the Brunei Fire and Rescue Department (BFRD), and there were no casualties reported on the incident. An investigation was launched to ascertain the cause and the extent of damage as a result of the fire. The food court's phase 3 was spared from the fire and continued to operate normally.

== Jerudong Park Amphitheatre ==
An Amphitheatre was opened in Jerudong Park & Garden on the evening of July 16, 1996. Thousands were welcomed into the theater on July 16 for a Michael Jackson concert. Michael Jackson performed a free concert on July 16, 1996 in front of 60,000 people. The show was held in celebration of the 50th birthday of Hassanal Bolkiah, the Sultan of Brunei, and was attended by the Brunei royal family, though the Sultan himself did not attend. The show was not part of the HIStory World Tour. In fact, the tour was kept a close secret. Jackson returned to perform another show on New Year's Eve 1996 for his HIStory World Tour.

On August 24, 1996, singer Whitney Houston performed at the park for the wedding of Princess Rashidah Sa'adatul, the eldest daughter of the Sultan of Brunei. It was a very momentous event that was attended by locals and foreigners. Janet Jackson performed a private concert during her Velvet Rope Tour to celebrate the twenty-first birthday of Princess Hamidah Jamalul Bulqiah of the Brunei royal family. An exclusive audio recording of the show was issued to all those in attendance.

== Little Kingdom Petting Zoo ==
Little Kingdom Petting Zoo is a petting zoo that was opened on the 15th of August 2022. The launch of the zoo was officiated by Yang Berhormat Dato Seri Setia Dr. Awang Abdul Manaf bin Haji Metussin, Minister of Primary Resources and Tourism who is also the Chairman of the JPCC Board of Directors.

Animals around the world including Africa, North and South America, as well as other species from both the Western and Eastern hemisphere are currently displayed at the zoo such as Indian Peacocks, Albino Burmese Pythons, Blue-tongue skinks, Leopard Tortoises, Hedgehogs, Meerkats, Racoons and the Falabella.

A gift shop is also available selling exclusively-designed merchandise featuring the different animals.

== Mini Stadium ==
The Mini Stadium has a football pitch and a grandstand which prominently houses a glassed seating area exclusive for Crown Prince Al-Muhtadee Billah and other royal family members. The official training ground of his club DPMM FC, it also hosts matches for the team's domestic games and youth league games.

== See also ==
- Jerudong Park Amphitheatre
