= Blake Ricciuto =

Australian soccer player

Personal information
- Full name: Blake Ashley Ricciuto Harriot
- Date of birth: 2 September 1992 (age 34)
- Place of birth: Sydney, Australia
- Height: 1.81 m (5 ft 11 in)
- Position: Central midfielder

Team information
- Current team: Bankstown City

Youth career
- Sydney Olympic
- APIA Leichhardt
- St George

Senior career*
Years	Team	Apps	(Gls)
2009–2011	St George	41	(2)
2014–2015	Peñarol	0	(0)
2014–2015	→ Canadian (loan)	27	(0)
2016–2018	Rockdale City Suns	66	(7)
2019	DPMM	29	(9)
2021–2023	Tanjong Pagar United	67	(12)
2024–2025	Rockdale Ilinden	53	(8)
2026–	Bankstown City	21	(1)
- * Club domestic league appearances and goals as of 22 June 2026

Blake Ashley Ricciuto Harriot (born 2 September 1992) is an Australian professional footballer who plays mainly as a central-midfielder for semi-professional club, Bankstown City. Ricciuto was born in Sydney, Australia. He is of Uruguayan and Italian descent and speaks both English and Spanish fluently.

== Career ==
=== St George ===
At the age of 15, Ricciuto made his debut for St George who played in which was then called the NSW Super League. He was a key part of the club for the 3 years he was there where he played in the 2010 Grand Final.

=== Danubio ===
Ricciuto went to try his luck in his fathers place of birth of Uruguay at the age of 19. He was lucky enough to get a trial with Danubio Reserves, which then consisted of current Atlético Madrid centre back José María Giménez, he impressed on his trial and the club offered him a contract but 3 days later due to a dispute between the Agent that recommended Ricciuto and the head of football. Blake was left without a club.

=== Peñarol ===
Ricciuto went on trial to his and his family's childhood club of Peñarol after not sealing a deal with Danubio, he was in trial for over 3 months until Uruguayan and Juventus legend Paolo Montero took over as a manager of the reserves and decided to sign the Australian/ Uruguayan midfielder. This team consisted of the likes of current Cagliari and Uruguay national team player Nahitan Nandez. On Ricciuto’s second start for the reserves during the curtain raiser for first grade at Estadio Jardines del Hipódromo he scored a 94th minute winner against Danubio. After this goal and several good performances he started to train regularly with first grade. Unfortunately he couldn’t crack the first team and he decided to go to second division side Canadian Soccer Club.

=== Canadian S.C ===
Ricciuto was a key part in Canadian Soccer Club historic run to the play off finals, he played 27 games in Uruguayan Segunda Division where they lost in the play off final to get promoted to Uruguayan Primera Division which is Uruguays top tier.

=== Rockdale City Suns ===
After an unsuccessful trial with Sydney FC following his stint in Uruguay even though impressing in a trial match against Belconnen Ricciuto signed at Rockdale City Suns on 19 January 2016 where he became a household name and a cult hero because of his David Luiz like hair. The 3 years at the club he was named player of the year twice and also team of the year of the NPL twice as well. He was a stand out performer in the FFA CUP game against Sydney FC. He was very unfortunate to not be snapped up by an A league side.

=== Brunei DPMM ===
After having a great season with Rockdale City Suns, Ricciuto attended a trial at Brunei DPMM and was signed by the club on 3 January 2019 for the 2019 season. He played a major role in the Bruneian club's title-winning season as a starter, scoring nine goals from midfield. He was named in the Singapore Premier League and Straits times Team of the Year and received Player of the Month and Goal of the month award for April. After leaving DPMM, he was poised to move to Vélez CF in Spain, but due to administration delays in his native Australia he was not registered in time for the start of the season.

=== Tanjong Pagar United ===
After the Vélez CF deal fell through, Ricciuto signed with Singapore Premier League club Tanjong Pagar United in January 2021 until the end of the season.

Ricciuto got off to a great start with Tanjong Pagar scoring on his debut for the club against Geylang in the opening 2021 fixture in round 1. He went to score another goal that season against Young Lions and finishing the season as the clubs leading assist taker with 6 assists next to his name.

After the 2021 season, Ricciuto announced that he wouldn't be returning to Tanjong Pagar United in search of a different challenge. He mentioned in a podcast that he had agreed to a deal at Indonesian club Persik Kediri but prior to travelling to Indonesia he contracted COVID-19 and the club wasn't able to go ahead with the deal. With this happening, Ricciuto announce his return to Tanjong Pagar United as the last foreign signing for 2022, he once again got off to a great start by starting round 1 with a Man of the Match performance with future champions Albirex Nigata leading them to a 2-0 victory, He later went on to have a standout season finishing the season as second leading goalscorer for the club with 7 goals with 5 of those goals coming in 5 consecutive games.

He has been announced to return for a third straight year at Tanjong Pagar as one of their key players.

=== Rockdale Ilinden ===
After spending three years in Singapore, Ricciuto returned to Sydney, Australia and joined Rockdale Ilinden on 7 February 2024.

== Career statistics ==
As of 2 October 2021.

Club	Season	League			Cup		Continental		Other		Total	
Club	Season	Division	Apps	Goals	Apps	Goals	Apps	Goals	Apps	Goals	Apps	Goals
Peñarol	2014/15	Uruguayan Primera División	0	0	0	0	–		0	0	0	0
Peñarol	Total		0	0	0	0	0	0	0	0	0	0
Canadian Soccer Club (loan)	2014/15	Uruguayan Segunda División	27	0	0	0	–		0	0	27	0
Canadian Soccer Club (loan)	Total		27	0	0	0	0	0	0	0	27	0
Rockdale City Suns	2016	National Premier Leagues NSW	23	3	0	0	–		0	0	23	3
Rockdale City Suns	2017	National Premier Leagues NSW	22	2	0	0	–		0	0	22	2
Rockdale City Suns	2018	National Premier Leagues NSW	21	2	0	0	–		0	0	21	2
Rockdale City Suns	Total		66	7	0	0	0	0	0	0	66	7
DPMM	2019	Singapore Premier League	23	9	6	0	–		0	0	29	9
DPMM	Total		23	9	6	0	0	0	0	0	29	9
Tanjong Pagar United	2021	Singapore Premier League	20	2	0	0	–		0	0	20	2
Tanjong Pagar United	2022	Singapore Premier League	26	6	3	1	–		0	0	29	7
Tanjong Pagar United	2023	Singapore Premier League	21	4	2	0	–		0	0	23	4
Tanjong Pagar United	Total		67	12	5	1	0	0	0	0	72	13
Rockdale Ilinden	2024	National Premier Leagues NSW	19	3	1	0	–		0	0	20	3
Rockdale Ilinden	Total		19	3	1	0	0	0	0	0	20	3
Career total			183	28	11	1	0	0	0	0	194	29

== Honours ==
=== Club ===
Brunei DPMM

- Singapore Premier League: 2019

=== Individual ===
- National Premier Leagues NSW 2018 Team of the year.
- National Premier Leagues NSW 2016 Team of the year.
- Rockdale City Suns FC 2016 & 2017 Player of the year.
- Singapore Premier League Team of the Year: 2019
- Singapore Premier League Player of the Month: April 2019
- Singapore Premier League Goal of the Month: April 2019
- DPMM FC: Player of the year 2019.
