= 2019 Singapore Premier League =

Singapore Premier League
- Season: 2019
- Champions: DPMM FC (2nd title)
- AFC Champions League: Tampines Rovers
- AFC Cup: Hougang United; Geylang International

The 2019 Singapore Premier League (also known as the AIA Singapore Premier League due to sponsorship reasons) was the second season of the Singapore Premier League, the top-flight Singaporean professional league for association football clubs, since its rebranding in 2018. A major overhaul from the new FAS management was made from this season onwards to improve the standard of Singapore football.

== Rules ==
The following key changes were made to the rules for the 2019 season:

1. Singapore Premier League clubs could sign three imports from next season after the increase in foreign player quota was raised at the Football Association of Singapore's 36th Annual Congress
2. From 2019, only four stadiums host regular matches. The 8 teams (excluding DPMM) will host the matches in the following stadiums. Our Tampines Hub (Tampines Rovers and Geylang International), Jalan Besar Stadium (Young Lions and Hougang United), Bishan Stadium (Home United and Balestier Khalsa) and Jurong East Stadium (Albirex Niigata and Warriors FC).
3. For 2019, Albirex is allowed to sign as many locals as their budget allows. However, the club are only allowed one Singaporean over the age of 23. Also, Albirex must have two Singaporeans in their starting lineup for each game.
4. Each team is now able to register up to 28 players in their squad, an increase of 3 players as compared to 2018.

== Teams ==
A total of 9 teams compete in the league. Albirex Niigata (S) and DPMM FC are invited foreign clubs from Japan and Brunei respectively. Despite large criticism and discussion against the Young Lions project, the Young Lions will continue to compete till 2019 for the purposes of training and preparing for the 2019 SEA Games. The criticism mainly focused on the poor performances every season by the largely youth team made up of Singapore Football's brightest prospects. Season-long consecutive losses against the rest of the more mature teams inflicts serious long-term consequences on the morale of the players, considering that most of these players are in the developmental ages of their footballing career. The new age restrictions imposed on the rest of the Singapore Premier League clubs could be seen as giving the Young Lions a better advantage in terms of seniority, but most critics and fans of Singapore football are still wanting the FAS to abolish the FAS-managed Young Lions and have them developed under the guidance of genuine local clubs.

=== Stadiums and locations ===
Location of 2018 Singapore Premier League teams
Locations of the 2018 Singapore Premier League teams from Singapore

Team	Stadium	Capacity
Albirex Niigata (S)	Jurong East Stadium	2,700
Balestier Khalsa	Bishan Stadium	3,500
DPMM FC	Hassanal Bolkiah National Stadium	28,000
Geylang International	Our Tampines Hub	5,000
Home United	Bishan Stadium	3,500
Hougang United	Jalan Besar Stadium	6,000
Tampines Rovers	Our Tampines Hub	5,000
Warriors FC	Jurong East Stadium	2,700
Young Lions	Jalan Besar Stadium	6,000

=== Personnel and sponsors ===
Note: Flags indicate national team as has been defined under FIFA eligibility rules. Players may hold more than one non-FIFA nationality.

Team	Head coach	Captain	Kit manufacturer	Main Shirt sponsor
Albirex Niigata (S)	(Japan) Keiji Shigetomi	(Japan) Kyoga Nakamura	Mizuno	Canon
Balestier Khalsa	(Croatia) Marko Kraljević	(Singapore) Zaiful Nizam	Lotto	Jeep
DPMM FC	(England) Adrian Pennock	(Brunei) Wardun Yussof	Lotto	
Geylang International	(Singapore) Mohd Noor Ali	(Japan) Yuki Ichikawa	FBT	Epson
Home United	(Singapore) Noh Rahman	(Singapore) Izzdin Shafiq	Puma	Linco Investments
Hougang United	(Singapore) Clement Teo	(Singapore) Zulfahmi Arifin	Warrix	Jalan Besar Stadium
Tampines Rovers	(Singapore) Kadir Yahaya	(Singapore) Shahdan Sulaiman	Hummel	Hyunudai Avante
Warriors FC	(Singapore) Razif Bin Onn	(Singapore) Khairul Nizam	Joma	Rhino Sports
Young Lions	(Singapore) Fandi Ahmad	(Singapore) Joshua Pereira	Nike	-

=== Coaching changes ===
Team	Outgoing Head Coach	Manner of Departure	Date of Vacancy	Position in table	Incoming Head Coach	Date of appointment
Geylang International	(Japan) Hirotaka Usui	End of exchange	29 September 2018	Pre-Season	(Singapore) Mohd Noor Ali	21 December 2018
Home United	(Singapore) Aidil Sharin Sahak	Signed by (Malaysia) Kedah FA	8 October 2018	Pre-Season	(Singapore) Saswadimata Dasuki	3 December 2018
Tampines Rovers	(Germany) Jurgen Raab	Sacked	9 October 2018	Pre-Season	(Singapore) Gavin Lee	9 October 2018
Tampines Rovers	(Singapore) Gavin Lee	No license	9 October 2018	Pre-Season	(Singapore) Kadir Yahaya	9 October 2018
DPMM FC	(Brazil) Renê Weber	Sacked	16 October 2018	Pre-Season	(England) Adrian Pennock	17 October 2018
Warriors FC	(Croatia) Mirko Grabovac	End of Contract	31 October 2018	Pre-Season	(Singapore) Azlan Alipah	1 November 2018
Albirex Niigata (S)	(Japan) Kazuaki Yoshinaga	End of contract	30 November 2018	Pre-Season	(Japan) Keiji Shigetomi	11 December 2018
Hougang United	NA	NA	28 December 2018	Pre-Season	(Singapore) Clement Teo	28 December 2018
Balestier Khalsa	(Croatia) Marko Kraljević	Signed by (Malaysia) Kelantan FA	26 January 2019	Pre-Season	(Singapore) Khidhir Khamis	4 February 2019
Home United	(Singapore) Saswadimata Dasuki	Sacked	19 April 2019	7th	(Singapore) Noh Rahman (interim)	19 April 2019
Home United	(Singapore) Noh Rahman (interim)	End of Caretaker	2 July 2019	6th	(Serbia) Radojko Avramović	2 July 2019
Home United	(Serbia) Radojko Avramović	Step down (health reason)	18 August 2019	5th	(Singapore) Noh Rahman (interim)	18 August 2019
Balestier Khalsa	(Singapore) Khidhir Khamis	Sacked	24 September 2019	9th	(Croatia) Marko Kraljević	24 September 2019

=== Foreigners ===
Singapore Premier League clubs could sign three imports from next season after the increase in foreign player quota was raised at the Football Association of Singapore's 36th Annual Congress

Albirex Niigata can sign up unlimited number of Singaporean players for the new season. Only 1 local player above 23 years old is allowed.

Players name in bold indicates the player was registered during the mid-season transfer window.

Club	Player 1	Player 2	Player 3	U21 Player 1	U21 Player 2	U21 Player 3	Former Players
Albirex Niigata (S)	(Singapore) Hyrulnizam Juma'at	(Singapore) Noor Akid Nordin	(Singapore) Daniel Martens	(Singapore) Firas Irwan	(Singapore) Zamani Zamri	(Singapore) Gerald Ang	
Balestier Khalsa	(Croatia) Kristijan Krajcek	(Croatia) Sime Zuzul		(Austria) Sanjin Vrebac			
DPMM FC	(Australia) Blake Ricciuto	(England) Charlie Clough	(Belarus) Andrey Varankow				
Geylang International	(Netherlands) Barry Maguire	(Japan) Yuki Ichikawa		(New Zealand) **Matthew Palmer**			(Australia) Morteza Safdari (Australia) Corey Warren
Home United	(Australia) Isaka Cernak	(South Korea) Song Ui-young		(Australia) Oliver Puflett			
Hougang United	(Croatia) Stipe Plazibat	(South Korea) Kong Ho-won		(France) **Paulin Mbaye**			(Brazil) Rafael Ramazotti
Tampines Rovers	(Canada) Jordan Webb	(Japan) Ryutaro Megumi		(Serbia) Zehrudin Mehmedović	(Bosnia and Herzegovina) Mirza Delimeđac		
Warriors FC	(France) Jonathan Béhé	(Japan) Kento Fukuda		(Japan) Ryosuke Nagasawa			

Note 1: Albirex, a Japanese club, is allowed to sign as many locals as their budget allows. However, the club are only allowed one Singaporean over the age of 23.

Note 2: DPMM FC, a Bruneian club, can sign 3 non-Bruneian foreigners.

Note 3: Singapore teams can sign 4 foreigners, of which 2 must be below 21 years old.

== Results ==
Home \ Away	ALB	BAL	DPM	GEY	HOM	HOU	TAM	WAR	YLI	ALB	BAL	DPM	GEY	HOM	HOU	TAM	WAR	YLI
Albirex Niigata (S)	—	2–1	0–0	2–0	4–0	1–2	3–1	1–0	2–1	—	2–0	0–0	NA	1–0	NA	NA	NA	4–1
Balestier Khalsa	1–3	—	1–7	3–0	2–4	0–1	1–1	2–1	0–1	NA	—	1–4	3–4	NA	3–4	NA	3–3	NA
DPMM	2–0	2–1	—	3–0	2–0	3–2	2–1	4–2	0–0	NA	NA	—	3–0	NA	5–4	0–1	3–0	NA
Geylang International	1–0	5–0	1–3	—	2–3	2–2	0–1	5–2	1–2	1–0	NA	NA	—	NA	4–4	2–1	4–3	NA
Home United	3–3	0–0	0–1	3–0	—	0–2	2–4	4–4	2–1	NA	1–3	1–0	3–2	—	NA	NA	NA	0–3
Hougang United	4–2	1–0	3–1	4–1	1–0	—	1–5	5–1	0–1	1–1	NA	NA	NA	2–0	—	2–4	3–1	NA
Tampines Rovers	0–0	4–2	3–1	1–1	5–1	3–3	—	1–2	4–0	2–0	3–3	NA	NA	3–0	NA	—	NA	1–1
Warriors	1–2	3–3	3–3	1–2	0–3	3–2	1–1	—	2–0	2–1	NA	NA	NA	1–3	NA	0–1	—	2–0
Young Lions	1–2	1–4	0–1	0–1	0–1	2–1	1–1	0–2	—	NA	1–0	1–1	1–2	NA	2–4	NA	NA	—

Legend: Blue = home team win; Yellow = draw; Red = away team win.

== League table ==
Pos	Team	Pld	W	D	L	GF	GA	GD	Pts	Qualification or relegation
1	DPMM (Note: The two foreign clubs – Albirex Niigata (S) and DPMM – as well as the Football Association of Singapore (FAS) under-21 team, Young Lions, are ineligible for any AFC competition spots.) (C)	24	15	5	4	51	25	+26	50	
2	Tampines Rovers	24	12	8	4	52	29	+23	44	Qualification for AFC Champions League preliminary round 1
3	Hougang United	24	13	4	7	58	45	+13	43	Qualification for AFC Cup group stage
4	Albirex Niigata (S)	24	12	5	7	36	25	+11	41	
5	Geylang International	24	10	3	11	41	48	−7	33	
6	Home United	24	9	3	12	34	46	−12	30	
7	Warriors	24	6	5	13	40	56	−16	23	
8	Young Lions	24	6	4	14	21	38	−17	22	
9	Balestier Khalsa	24	4	5	15	37	58	−21	17	

Source: Singapore Premier League
Rules for classification: 1) points; 2) goal difference; 3) number of goals scored; 4) number of wins
(C) Champions

== Statistics ==
=== Top scorers ===
As of 29 September 2019.

Rank	Player	Club	Goals
1	(Belarus) Andrey Varankow	DPMM FC	21
2	(Singapore) Faris Ramli	Hougang United	16
3	(Canada) Jordan Webb	Tampines Rovers	15
4	(France) Jonathan Béhé	Warriors FC	12
5	(Singapore) Hazzuwan Halim	Balestier Khalsa	10
6	(Croatia) Stipe Plazibat	Hougang United	9
6	(Australia) Blake Ricciuto	DPMM FC	9
6	(Singapore) Gabriel Quak	Warriors FC	9
6	(Croatia) Sime Zuzul	Balestier Khalsa	9
6	(Singapore) Fareez Farhan	Geylang International	9
11	(Singapore) Shawal Anuar	Geylang International	8
11	(Singapore) Shahfiq Ghani	Hougang United	8
13	(Japan) Hiroyoshi Kamata	Albirex Niigata (S)	7
13	(Japan) Kyoga Nakamura	Albirex Niigata (S)	7
13	(Singapore) Shahril Ishak	Home United	7
13	(Serbia) Zehrudin Mehmedović	Tampines Rovers	7

=== Clean sheets ===
As of 29 September 2019.

Rank	Player	Club	Clean sheets
1	(Brunei) Wardun Yussof	DPMM FC	10
2	(Japan) Kengo Fukudome	Albirex Niigata (S)	8
3	(Singapore) Syazwan Buhari	Tampines Rovers	6
4	(Singapore) Nazri Sabri	Home United	5
5	(Singapore) Ridhuan Barudin	Hougang United	4

=== Hat-tricks ===
Player	For	Against	Result	Date	Reference
(Belarus) Andrey Varankow ^{5}	DPMM FC	Balestier Khalsa	7–1	13 April 2019	
(Belarus) Andrey Varankow	DPMM FC	Warriors FC	3–0	14 September 2019	
(Singapore) Fareez Farhan	Geylang International	Hougang United	4–4	15 September 2019	
(Singapore) Shahfiq Ghani	Hougang United	DPMM FC	4–5	29 September 2019	

Note ^{4} Player scored 4 goals ^{5} Player scored 5 goals

=== Own goal ===
Player	Team	Against	Date
(Singapore) Zulfahmi Arifin	Hougang United	Tampines Rovers	3 March 2019
(Singapore) Darren Teh	Geylang International	Balestier Khalsa	31 March 2019
(Singapore) Lionel Tan	Young Lions	Tampines Rovers	29 May 2019
(Singapore) Shah Shahiran	Tampines Rovers	Albirex Niigata (S)	15 June 2019
(Singapore) Hairul Syirhan	Geylang International	Warriors FC	18 September 2019

=== Penalty missed ===
Player	For	Against	Date
(Singapore) Shahdan Sulaiman	Tampines Rovers	Hougang United	3 March 2019
(Singapore) Taufik Suparno	Tampines Rovers	Home United	8 March 2019
(Japan) Kyoga Nakamura	Albirex Niigata (S)	Warriors FC	13 April 2019
(Singapore) Faris Ramli	Hougang United	Balestier Khalsa	12 May 2019
(France) Jonathan Béhé	Warriors FC	DPMM FC	6 July 2019
(Croatia) Sime Zuzul	Balestier Khalsa	Warriors FC	19 July 2019
(Singapore) Shahril Ishak	Home United	Balestier Khalsa	14 August 2019
(Canada) Jordan Webb	Tampines Rovers	Albirex Niigata (S)	18 August 2019
(Singapore) Shahril Ishak	Home United	Hougang United	1 September 2019
(Singapore) Amy Recha	Geylang International	Home United	21 September 2019

== Awards ==
=== Monthly awards ===
Month	Player of the Month		Young Player of the Month		Reference
Month	Coach	Club	Player	Club	Reference
April	(Australia) Blake Ricciuto	DPMM FC	(Japan) Kyoga Nakamura	Albirex Niigata (S)	
May	(Singapore) Gabriel Quak	Warriors FC	(Japan) Kyoga Nakamura	Albirex Niigata (S)	
June	(Singapore) Shawal Anuar	Geylang International	(Singapore) Zikos Chua	Geylang International	
July	(Singapore) Christopher van Huizen	Geylang International	(Singapore) Zikos Chua	Geylang International	
August	(Croatia) Šime Žužul	Balestier Khalsa	(Singapore) Jacob Mahler	Young Lions	
September	(Singapore) Shahfiq Ghani	Hougang United	(Singapore) Faizal Raffi	Warriors FC	

== Singapore Premier League Awards night winners ==
Awards	Winners	Club
Player of the Year	(Singapore) Faris Ramli	Hougang United
Young Player of the Year	(Singapore) Hami Syahin	Home United
Coach of the Year	(England) Adrian Pennock	DPMM FC
Top Scorer Award	(Belarus) Andrey Varankow	DPMM FC
Fair Play Award	Albirex Niigata (S)	
Referee of the Year	(Singapore) Farhan Mohd	—N/a

StraitsTime Team of the Year
Goalkeeper	(Brunei) Wardun Yussof (DPMM FC)			
Defence	(Singapore) Nazrul Nazari (Hougang United)	(Japan) Kaishu Yamazaki (Albirex Niigata (S))	(Japan) Yuki Ichikawa (Geylang International)	(Singapore) Irwan Shah (Tampines Rovers)
Midfield	(Australia) Blake Ricciuto (DPMM FC)		(Japan) Kyoga Nakamura (Albirex Niigata (S))	(Singapore) Shahdan Sulaiman (Tampines Rovers)
Attack	(Singapore) Gabriel Quak (Warriors FC)		(Singapore) Faris Ramli (Hougang United)	(Belarus) Andrei Varankou (DPMM FC)

AIA Team of the Year
Goalkeeper	(Brunei) Wardun Yussof (DPMM FC)			
Defence	(Singapore) Nazrul Nazari (Hougang United)	(Japan) Kaishu Yamazaki (Albirex Niigata (S))	(England) Charlie Clough (DPMM FC)	(Singapore) Irwan Shah (Tampines Rovers)
Midfield	(Australia) Blake Ricciuto (DPMM FC)		(Japan) Kyoga Nakamura (Albirex Niigata (S))	(Singapore) Shahdan Sulaiman (Tampines Rovers)
Attack	(Singapore) Shawal Anuar (Geylang International)		(Singapore) Faris Ramli (Hougang United)	(Belarus) Andrei Varankou (DPMM FC)
