= Adrian Pennock =

English footballer and manager

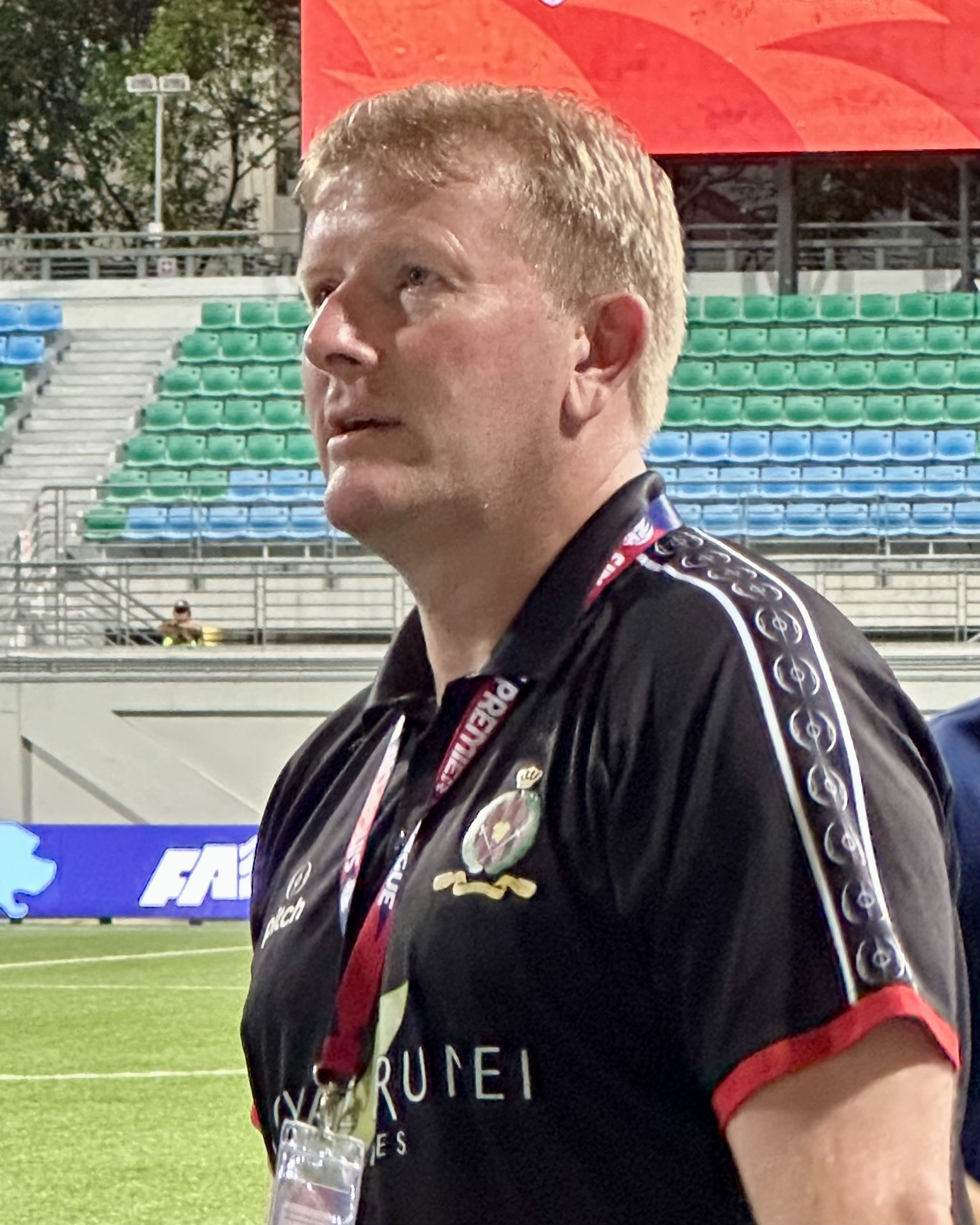
- Pennock with DPMM in 2023

Personal information
- Full name: Adrian Barry Pennock
- Date of birth: 27 March 1971 (age 55)
- Place of birth: Ipswich, England
- Position: Central defender

Team information
- Current team: Ramsgate (manager)

Youth career
- 1986–1989: Norwich City

Senior career*
Years	Team	Apps	(Gls)
1989–1992	Norwich City	1	(0)
1991	→ Molde FK (loan)	15	(1)
1992–1996	AFC Bournemouth	131	(9)
1996–2003	Gillingham	168	(2)
2003–2005	Gravesend & Northfleet	14	(0)
Total		329	(12)

Managerial career
- 2005–2007: Welling United
- 2013–2016: Forest Green Rovers
- 2017: Gillingham
- 2017–2018: Barrow
- 2019–2021: DPMM
- 2023: DPMM
- 2024–2026: Dartford
- 2026–: Ramsgate
- * Club domestic league appearances and goals

Adrian Barry Pennock (born 27 March 1971) is an English former footballer who played for Norwich City, Molde FK, AFC Bournemouth, Gillingham and Gravesend & Northfleet. He is currently the manager of Ramsgate.

He spent two years as Welling United manager before joining Stoke City to be first team coach. He left at the end of the 2012–13 season following the departure of Tony Pulis, and on 12 November 2013, he was appointed as a manager for Forest Green Rovers where he twice led them to record highest league finishes.

He left his position as head coach of League One side Gillingham in September 2017, and was appointed as manager of National League club Barrow the following month, a post he held until the end of the 2017–18 season. In 2019 he was appointed manager of DPMM of Brunei, a team that plays in the Singapore Premier League. From 1 March 2024 to 25 April 2026 he was the manager of Dartford. On 28 April 2026, Pennock became the manager of Ramsgate.

== Playing career ==
=== Norwich City ===
Although born in Ipswich and having grown up supporting Ipswich Town, Pennock began his career with their fiercest rivals, Norwich City, where he progressed through the ranks to turn professional in 1989. He was only to manage one appearance for the Canaries' first team

=== AFC Bournemouth ===
In 1992, Pennock was allowed to move to AFC Bournemouth for a fee of £30,000. He was a regular for the Cherries until he suffered a knee injury in December 1995 and was unable to regain his place in the team.

=== Gillingham ===
In October 1996 his former Bournemouth manager, Tony Pulis signed him for Gillingham for £25,000. Pennock spent over six years at Priestfield Stadium where he was a regular in the first team at Gillingham until a recurring knee injury took its toll. He developed a reputation as a practical joker whilst with Gillingham – during one pre-season friendly he switched on the pitch sprinkler system during the match. He also scored a memorable own goal against Wigan Athletic in 2000 which spawned a recurring terrace chant of "He only scores own goals". Such was his affinity with the fans that he even acquired his own fan club, The Adrian Pennock Fan Club. On the pitch, he was named captain for the 2000 Football League Second Division play-off final which saw the Gills promoted to the Football League First Division for the first time in their history.

=== Gravesend & Northfleet ===
Injuries forced Pennock to retire from League football in 2003, after which he signed for Football Conference side Gravesend & Northfleet, where he was also assistant manager.

In January 2006, he was involved in a dispute with Gillingham chairman Paul Scally over a testimonial match which Pennock alleged he was promised as part of his final contract at Gillingham but which never materialised.

== Managerial career ==
=== Welling United ===
In January 2005 Pennock was appointed manager of Welling United of the Conference South and by the end of the season had guided them to their best league position for six years.

=== Stoke City (coach) ===
He left Welling at the end of the 2006–07 season to take up a coaching position at Stoke City, under his former Gillingham manager, Tony Pulis. He was initially appointed youth team boss at Stoke. In January 2010, Pennock expressed an interest in one day returning to management. In the summer of 2011 he made the step up to become first team coach at Stoke. He left the club at the end of the 2012–13 season.

=== Forest Green Rovers ===
On 12 November 2013, Pennock was appointed as the new manager of Conference Premier side Forest Green Rovers. He led the club to a 10th-place finish at the end of the 2013–14 season.

In January 2015, he was linked with the vacant managerial role at Gillingham, however he issued a statement declaring his aim to remain at Forest Green.

At the end of the 2014–15 season he led Forest Green to a record highest league finish of 5th in the Conference Premier, meaning that the club secured a place in the play-offs for the first time. Forest Green were knocked out in the semi-finals, losing 3–0 on aggregate against Bristol Rovers.

On 4 September 2015, after leading Forest Green to seven straight wins in the renamed National League at the start of the 2015–16 season, he was named August Manager of the Month. On 5 September 2015, he led the club to an eighth straight league win at the start of the season with victory at Chester – a National League record. On 5 February 2016, he was named National League January Manager of the Month having guided Forest Green to six straight wins.

Despite taking Forest Green to 2nd in the National League, which was another record highest finish, he was relieved of his duties on 27 April 2016, just one week before the play-offs, after a poor run of results that had failed to see his side win in seven games.

In November 2016, he returned to Welling United after being appointed as a consultant to new manager Jamie Day, who had been his assistant at Forest Green.

=== Gillingham ===
On 4 January 2017, Pennock was appointed as the new head coach of his former club and League One side Gillingham. Steve Lovell and Jamie Day were announced as part of his team of coaching staff. Pennock and Day left Gillingham by mutual consent on 25 September 2017, following a 3–0 defeat at Rochdale.

=== Barrow ===
On 27 October 2017, Pennock was appointed as manager of National League side Barrow. Barrow parted company with Pennock on 18 May 2018, with the side having narrowly avoided relegation.

=== DPMM ===
At the conclusion of the 2018 Singapore Premier League season, DPMM appointed Pennock as manager for the 2019 season. Pennock led the Brunei side to their second Singapore Premier League title in his first season in charge. The COVID-19 pandemic prevented Pennock from defending the title in the 2020 season, and the team opted to play locally in 2021, leading the table when it was postponed and eventually abandoned due to a local outbreak of COVID-19 inside the country.

Pennock returned to Brunei in 2023 after leaving the reins to Helme Panjang the previous year, and coached DPMM in their return to the Singapore Premier League in the 2023 season, finishing in seventh place.

=== Dartford ===
On 1 March 2024, Pennock was named the manager of Dartford of the National League South, the sixth tier of the English football league system. He stepped down as manager of the club at the conclusion of the 2025–26 Isthmian Premier League season.

=== Ramsgate ===
On 28 April 2026, Pennock became the manager of Ramsgate.

== Career statistics ==
=== Player ===
Appearances and goals by club, season and competition
Club	Season	League			FA Cup		League Cup		Other^{[A]}		Total	
Club	Season	Division	Apps	Goals	Apps	Goals	Apps	Goals	Apps	Goals	Apps	Goals
Norwich City	1989–90	First Division	1	0	0	0	0	0	0	0	1	0
Norwich City	1990–91	First Division	0	0	0	0	0	0	0	0	0	0
Norwich City	1991–92	First Division	0	0	0	0	0	0	0	0	0	0
Norwich City	Total		1	0	0	0	0	0	0	0	1	0
Molde FK (loan)	1991	Tippeligaen	15	1	0	0	0	0	0	0	15	1
Molde FK (loan)	Total		15	1	0	0	0	0	0	0	15	1
AFC Bournemouth	1992–93	Second Division	43	1	4	0	2	0	2	0	51	1
AFC Bournemouth	1993–94	Second Division	40	3	3	1	4	0	1	0	48	4
AFC Bournemouth	1994–95	Second Division	31	5	2	0	0	0	2	0	35	5
AFC Bournemouth	1995–96	Second Division	17	0	3	0	3	0	3	0	26	0
AFC Bournemouth	Total		131	9	12	1	9	0	8	0	160	10
Gillingham	1996–97	Second Division	26	2	2	0	1	0	1	0	30	2
Gillingham	1997–98	Second Division	20	0	0	0	0	0	0	0	20	0
Gillingham	1998–99	Second Division	40	0	1	0	1	0	6	0	48	0
Gillingham	1999–2000	Second Division	34	0	6	1	4	0	4	0	48	1
Gillingham	2000–01	First Division	35	0	2	0	0	0	0	0	37	0
Gillingham	2001–02	First Division	10	0	0	0	3	0	0	0	13	0
Gillingham	2002–03	First Division	3	0	0	0	0	0	0	0	3	0
Gillingham	Total		168	2	11	1	9	0	11	0	199	3
Gravesend & Northfleet	2002–03	Conference National	10	0	0	0	0	0	0	0	10	0
Gravesend & Northfleet	2003–04	Conference National	4	0	0	0	0	0	0	0	4	0
Gravesend & Northfleet	Total		14	0	0	0	0	0	0	0	14	0
Career total			329	12	23	2	18	0	19	0	389	14

A. The "Other" column constitutes appearances and goals in the Football League Trophy and Football League play-offs.

=== Manager ===
As of match played 22 September 2026

Team	From	To	Record					Ref
Team	From	To	G	W	D	L	Win %	Ref
Welling United	14 January 2005	27 April 2007	103	44	26	33	42.72	
Forest Green Rovers	12 November 2013	27 April 2016	140	64	37	39	45.71	
Gillingham	4 January 2017	25 September 2017	32	6	11	15	18.75	
Barrow	27 October 2017	18 May 2018	32	10	10	12	31.25	
DPMM	1 January 2019	31 December 2023	62	27	12	23	43.55	
Dartford	1 March 2024	25 April 2026	111	52	26	33	46.85	
Ramsgate	28 April 2026	Present	11	5	1	5	45.45	
Total			491	208	123	160	42.36	

== Honours ==
=== Player ===
Gillingham

- Football League Second Division play-offs: 2000

=== Manager ===
DPMM

- Singapore Premier League: 2019

Individual

- National League Manager of the Month: August 2015, January 2016
- Singapore Premier League Coach of the Year: 2019

== Personal life ==
In October 2023, Pennock, his wife Tania, and their son Ashley were among the winners of a £1 million prize in the People's Postcode Lottery paid out to residents of Hempstead near Gillingham.
