= 2018 DPMM FC season =

18th season in existence of DPMM FC

DPMM FC
2018 season
- Chairman: HRH Prince Al-Muhtadee Billah
- Head coach: Rene Weber
- Stadium: Hassanal Bolkiah National Stadium
- Singapore Premier League: 3rd
Home colours	Away colours	Third colours

The 2018 season was DPMM FC's 7th consecutive season in the top flight of Singapore football and in the Singapore Premier League. Along with the SGPL, the club will also compete in the Singapore Cup.

== Squad ==
=== S.League squad ===
As of 12 March 2018

Squad No.	Name	Nationality	Date of birth (age)	Previous club
Goalkeepers
1	Haimie Anak Nyaring	(Brunei)	31 May 1998 (age 28)	(Brunei) Indera SC
18	Ishyra Asmin Jabidi	(Brunei)	9 July 1998 (age 28)	(Brunei) Kasuka FC
25	Wardun Yussof	(Brunei)	14 September 1981 (age 45)	(Brunei) Majra FC
Defenders
2	Brian McLean	(Northern Ireland)	28 February 1985 (age 41)	(Iceland) IBV
3	Abdul Mu'iz Sisa	(Brunei)	20 April 1991 (age 35)	(Brunei) Indera SC
4	Fakharrazi Hassan	(Brunei)	15 July 1989 (age 37)	(Brunei) MS ABDB
5	Reduan Petara	(Brunei)	25 May 1988 (age 38)	(Brunei) Indera SC
11	Najib Tarif	(Brunei)	5 February 1988 (age 38)	(Brunei) MS PDB
13	Suhaimi Anak Sulau	(Brunei)	3 March 1996 (age 30)	(Brunei) Indera SC
14	Helmi Zambin	(Brunei)	30 March 1987 (age 39)	(Brunei) Indera SC
21	Abdul Aziz Tamit	(Brunei)	7 September 1989 (age 37)	(Brunei) Kasuka FC
23	Yura Indera Putera Yunos	(Brunei)	25 March 1996 (age 30)	(Brunei) Majra FC
24	Hanif Hamir	(Brunei)	22 February 1997 (age 29)	(Brunei) Tabuan Muda
Midfielders
6	Azwan Saleh	(Brunei)	1 June 1988 (age 38)	(Brunei) Indera SC
7	Azwan Ali Rahman	(Brunei)	11 January 1992 (age 34)	(Brunei) Indera SC
8	Hendra Azam Idris	(Brunei)	10 August 1988 (age 38)	(Brunei) QAF FC
15	Abdul Hariz Herman	(Brunei)	24 September 2000 (age 26)	(Brunei) Tabuan Muda 'A'
16	Azim Izamuddin Suhaimi	(Brunei)	20 May 1997 (age 29)	(Brunei) Tabuan Muda
17	Shafie Effendy	(Brunei)	4 August 1995 (age 31)	(Brunei) Indera SC
19	Nur Ikhwan Othman	(Brunei)	15 January 1993 (age 33)	(Brunei) Indera SC
Strikers
9	Abdul Azizi Ali Rahman	(Brunei)	17 January 1987 (age 39)	(Brunei) MS ABDB
10	Volodymyr Pryyomov	(Ukraine)	2 January 1986 (age 40)	(Ukraine) FC Olimpik Donetsk
12	Mojtaba Esmaeilzadeh	(Iran)	8 December 1990 (age 35)	(Iran) F.C. Iranjavan Bushehr
20	Adi Said	(Brunei)	15 October 1990 (age 35)	(Brunei) Majra FC
22	Shahrazen Said	(Brunei)	14 December 1985 (age 40)	(Brunei) Wijaya FC

== Coaching staff ==
Position	Name	Ref.
Head coach	(Brazil) Rene Weber	
Assistant coach	(Brunei) Moksen Mohammad	
Goalkeeping coach	(Brunei) Zainol Ariffin Jumaat	
Team manager	(Brunei) Mohammad Ali bin Hj Momin	
Physiotherapist	(Brunei) Faisal Hashim & Masri Tahir	
Kitman	(Brunei) Kasim Amit	
Fitness coach	(Brazil) Luciano Ilha	

== Transfers ==
=== Mid-season transfers ===
==== In ====
Position	Player	Transferred From	Ref
GK	(Brunei) Ishyra Asmin Jabidi	(Brunei) Kasuka FC	

==== Out ====
Position	Player	Transferred To	Ref
GK	(Brunei) Mu'izzuddin Ismail	(Brunei) MS PDB	

=== Pre-season transfers ===
==== In ====
Position	Player	Transferred From	Ref
GK	(Brunei) Haimie Anak Nyaring	(Brunei) Indera SC	
DF	(Brunei) Abdul Aziz Tamit	(Brunei) Kasuka FC	
DF	(Brunei) Fakharrazi Hassan	(Brunei) MS ABDB	
DF	(Brunei) Suhaimi Anak Sulau	(Brunei) Indera SC	
DF	(Northern Ireland) Brian McLean	(Iceland) IBV	
MF	(Brunei) Abdul Hariz Herman	(Brunei) Tabuan Muda "A"	
MF	(Brunei) Shafie Effendy	(Brunei) Indera SC	
FW	(Brunei) Abdul Azizi Ali Rahman	(Brunei) MS ABDB	
FW	(Iran) Mojtaba Esmaeilzadeh	(Iran) FC Iranjavan	
FW	(Ukraine) Volodymyr Pryyomov	(Ukraine) FC Olimpik Donetsk	

==== Out ====
Position	Player	Transferred To	Ref
DF	(Chile) Vincent Salas	(Chile) Deportes Copiapó	
FW	(Chile) Daúd Gazale		
FW	(Brazil) (Italy) Rafael Ramazotti	(Malaysia) PKNS F.C.	
GK	(Brunei) Alizanda Sitom		
DF	(Brunei) Aminuddin Zakwan Tahir	(Brunei) Indera SC	
DF	(Brunei) Haizul Rani Metusin	(Brunei) MS ABDB	
DF	(Brunei) Hazwan Hamzah	(Brunei) Indera SC	
MF	(Brunei) Maududi Hilmi Kasmi	(Brunei) Kasuka FC	
MF	(Brunei) Rosmin Kamis	(Brunei) MS ABDB	
FW	(Brunei) Khairul Anwar Abdul Rahim	(Brunei) Kasuka FC	

==== On Trial ====
Position	Player	From	Ref
DF	(Jamaica) Dicoy Williams	(Jamaica) Harbour View F.C.	
FW	(Ghana) Jordan Mintah	(Philippines) Kaya F.C.	
DF	(Croatia) Karlo Kešinović	Free agent	
FW	(Slovakia) Michal Hamuľak	(Slovakia) Partizán Bardejov	
DF	(Suriname) Norichio Nieveld	Free agent	
MF	(Chile) Pablo González	(Finland) RoPS	
MF	(Japan) Tatsuro Inui	(Japan) Blaublitz Akita	
MF	(Bosnia and Herzegovina) Toni Tipurić	Free agent	
DF	(Brazil) Eleílson	Free agent	

== Friendlies ==
Win Draw Loss

=== Pre-season ===
21 February Pre-Season Friendly	MS ABDB (Brunei)	0–6	(Brunei) DPMM FC	Hassanal Bolkiah National Stadium, Bandar Seri Begawan
16:15		Report

3 March Pre-Season Friendly	Brunei U21	0–4	(Brunei) DPMM FC	Hassanal Bolkiah National Stadium, Bandar Seri Begawan
		Report

20 March Pre-Season Friendly	Air Force Central (Thailand)	1–2	(Brunei) DPMM FC	Rangsit, Thailand
		Report	Pryyomov	Stadium: Thupatemi Stadium

22 March Pre-Season Friendly	Thai Honda FC (Thailand)	2–0	(Brunei) DPMM FC	Bangkok, Thailand
	Malisorn; Madsoh	Report		Stadium: 72nd Anniversary Stadium (Min Buri)

24 March Pre-Season Friendly	Kasetsart FC (Thailand)	1–2	(Brunei) DPMM FC	Bangkok, Thailand
		Report	Adi; Pryyomov	Stadium: TOT Stadium Chaeng Watthana

2 April Pre-Season Friendly	DPMM FC (Brunei)	1–3	(Malaysia) Sabah FA	Hassanal Bolkiah National Stadium, Bandar Seri Begawan
	Aziz 65'	Report	Justin 44', 80'; Héctor 45'

== Team statistics ==
=== Appearances and goals ===
No.	Pos.	Player	SGPL		Singapore Cup		Total	
No.	Pos.	Player	Apps.	Goals	Apps.	Goals	Apps.	Goals
1	GK	(Brunei) Haimie Anak Nyaring	22	0	5	0	27	0
2	DF	(Northern Ireland) Brian McLean	23	2	5	1	28	3
3	DF	(Brunei) Abdul Mu'iz Sisa	4+3	0	0+1	0	8	0
4	DF	(Brunei) Fakharrazi Hassan	2	0	1	0	3	0
5	DF	(Brunei) Reduan Petara	2	0	0	0	2	0
6	MF	(Brunei) Azwan Saleh	14	1	3+1	0	18	1
7	MF	(Brunei) Azwan Ali Rahman	15+2	0	5	3	22	3
8	MF	(Brunei) Hendra Azam Idris	23	0	4	0	27	0
9	FW	(Brunei) Abdul Azizi Ali Rahman	2+11	4	0+4	0	17	4
10	FW	(Ukraine) Volodymyr Pryyomov	23	18	5	4	28	22
11	DF	(Brunei) Najib Tarif	5+3	0	2+3	0	13	0
12	FW	(Iran) Mojtaba Esmaeilzadeh	14+1	4	0+1	0	16	4
13	DF	(Brunei) Suhaimi Anak Sulau	16	1	3	0	19	1
14	DF	(Brunei) Helmi Zambin	22+1	1	3	0	26	1
15	MF	(Brunei) Abdul Hariz Herman	0+4	0	0	0	4	0
16	MF	(Brunei) Azim Izamuddin Suhaimi	0	0	0	0	0	0
17	MF	(Brunei) Shafie Effendy	3+9	0	0+2	0	14	0
18	GK	(Brunei) Ishyra Asmin Jabidi	0	0	0	0	0	0
19	MF	(Brunei) Nurikhwan Othman	6+2	0	2+1	0	11	0
20	FW	(Brunei) Adi Said	24	11	5	0	29	11
21	DF	(Brunei) Abdul Aziz Tamit	21	1	5	0	26	1
22	FW	(Brunei) Shah Razen Said	13+4	3	5	2	22	5
23	DF	(Brunei) Yura Indera Putera Yunos	6+2	0	1	0	9	0
24	DF	(Brunei) Hanif Hamir	2+6	0	0	0	8	0
25	GK	(Brunei) Wardun Yussof	2+1	0	0	0	3	0

== Competitions ==
=== Overview ===
Competition	Record							
Competition	P	W	D	L	GF	GA	GD	Win %
S.League	24	11	8	5	46	38	+8	45.83
Singapore Cup	5	2	2	1	10	8	+2	40.00
Total	29	13	10	6	56	46	+10	44.83

=== Singapore Premier League ===
Win Draw Loss

7 April 2018 Round 1	DPMM FC (Brunei)	4–2	(Singapore) Home United	Hassanal Bolkiah National Stadium
20:15	Priyomov 13', 54'; Aziz 15'; Esmaeilzadeh 71'	Report	Haimie 73' (o.g.); Shahril 90+2'

14 April 2018 Round 2	Albirex Niigata (S) (Japan)	2–0	(Brunei) DPMM FC	Jurong East Stadium
17:30	Adam 1'; Murofushi 4'

17 April 2018 Round 3	DPMM FC (Brunei)	4–1	(Singapore) Geylang International	Hassanal Bolkiah National Stadium
20:15	Adi 12'; Esmaeilzadeh 24'; Priyomov 54', 56'		Noor 20'

2 May 2018 Round 4	Warriors FC (Singapore)	2–2	(Brunei) DPMM FC	Choa Chu Kang Stadium
20:15	Fukuda 7'; Sahil 8'		Priyomov 35' (pen.), 67'

13 May 2018 Round 5	Balestier Khalsa (Singapore)	1–2	(Brunei) DPMM FC	Toa Payoh Stadium
17:30	Hazzuwan 2'		Priyomov 55'; Adi 64' (pen.)

23 May 2018 Round 6	Young Lions (Singapore)	1–1	(Brunei) DPMM FC	Jalan Besar Stadium
20:30	Ikhsan 66'	Report	Adi 87'

26 May 2018 Round 7	Home United (Singapore)	3–1	(Brunei) DPMM FC	Bishan Stadium
20:30	Shakir 10'; Song 34'; Camara 75'	Report	Adi 30'

3 June 2018 Round 8	Albirex Niigata (S) (Japan)	5–0	(Brunei) DPMM FC	Jurong East Stadium
20:30	Hoshino 9', 36'; Murofushi 40', 90+2'; Morinaga 78'	Report

10 June 2018 Round 9	Geylang International (Singapore)	2–6	(Brunei) DPMM FC	Bedok Stadium
20:30	Fairoz 69'; Shawal 73'	Report	Priyomov 6'; Adi 45', 85'; Esmaeilzadeh 47'; Azwan S. 59'; Helmi 67'

24 June 2018 Round 11	Hougang United (Singapore)	1–1	(Brunei) DPMM FC	National Stadium, Singapore
17:30	Ng 23' (pen.)	Report	Priyomov 79'

30 June 2018 Round 12	DPMM FC (Brunei)	2–1	(Singapore) Warriors FC	Hassanal Bolkiah National Stadium
20:15	Esmaeilzadeh 57'; Adi 66'	Report	Ang 26'

4 July 2018 Round 13	Tampines Rovers (Singapore)	0–2	(Brunei) DPMM FC	Our Tampines Hub
20:15		Report	Priyomov 40', 49' (pen.)

7 July 2018 Round 14	DPMM FC (Brunei)	2–2	(Singapore) Balestier Khalsa	Hassanal Bolkiah National Stadium
20:15	Suhaimi 5'; Shahrazen 23' (pen.)	Report	Fadli 50'; Huzaifah 67'

11 July 2018 Round 15	DPMM FC (Brunei)	3–2	(Singapore) Hougang United	Hassanal Bolkiah National Stadium
20:15	Priyomov 6'; Adi 63'; Shahrazen 90'	Report	Kwok 31'; Fareez 73'

18 July 2018 Round 16	DPMM FC (Brunei)	1–1	(Singapore) Tampines Rovers	Hassanal Bolkiah National Stadium
20:15	Adi 58'		Khairul 45'

21 July 2018 Round 17	DPMM FC (Brunei)	1–2	(Singapore) Home United	Hassanal Bolkiah National Stadium
20:15	McLean 80'	Report	Hafiz 45'; Shahril 47'

7 August 2018 Round 18	DPMM FC (Brunei)	1–3	(Japan) Albirex Niigata (S)	Hassanal Bolkiah National Stadium
20:15	Priyomov 12' (pen.)	Report	Hoshino 26'; Moriyasu 72'; Morinaga 90+2'

11 August 2018 Round 19	DPMM FC (Brunei)	2–2	(Singapore) Geylang International	Hassanal Bolkiah National Stadium
20:30	Adi 18'; McLean 43'	Report	Yeo 3'; Fairoz 45'

15 August 2018 Round 10 (Rescheduled)	Young Lions (Singapore)	1–1	(Brunei) DPMM FC	Jalan Besar Stadium
19:45	Shah Razen 46'	Report	Ikhsan 50' (pen.)

18 August 2018 Round 20	DPMM FC (Brunei)	3–1	(Singapore) Hougang United	Hassanal Bolkiah National Stadium
20:30	Abdul Azizi 3', 44', 45'	Result	Fazrul 49'

15 September 2018 Round 21	Warriors FC (Singapore)	1–2	(Brunei) DPMM FC	Choa Chu Kang Stadium
17:30	Fukuda 34'	Report	Priyomov 42', 70'

22 September 2018 Round 22	DPMM FC (Brunei)	2–0	(Singapore) Tampines Rovers	Hassanal Bolkiah National Stadium
20:30	Priyomov 49', 63'	Report	Bennett 78'

29 September 2018 Round 24 (Rescheduled)	Balestier Khalsa (Singapore)	0–0	(Brunei) DPMM FC	Toa Payoh Stadium
17:30		Report

9 October 2018 Round 23 (Rescheduled)	DPMM FC (Brunei)	3–1	(Singapore) Young Lions	Hassanal Bolkiah National Stadium
20:30	Adi 52'; Priyomov 65'; Azizi 71'	Report	Hami 69'

=== Singapore Cup ===
23 August 2018 First Round	DPMM FC (Brunei)	2–2	(Singapore) Warriors FC	Jalan Besar Stadium
19:45	McLean 65'; Priyomov 84'	Report	Behe 8'; Ang 35'

19 September 2018 First Round	Warriors FC (Singapore)	0–3	(Brunei) DPMM FC	Choa Chu Kang Stadium
19:45		Report	Shah Razen 9'; Azwan Ali 28'; Priyomov 90'	Referee: Muhammad Zulfiqar

26 September 2018 Semi-final	Balestier Khalsa (Singapore)	0–2	(Brunei) DPMM FC	Toa Payoh Stadium
19:30	Priyomov 68' (pen.); Azwan Ali 70'	Report

3 October 2018 Semi-final	DPMM FC (Brunei)	2–2	(Singapore) Balestier Khalsa	Toa Payoh Stadium
19:45	Shah Razen 79'; Priyomov 83'	Report	Hazzuwan 37' (pen.); Huzaifah 41'

6 October 2018 Final	Albirex Niigata (S) (Japan)	4–1	(Brunei) DPMM FC	Jalan Besar Stadium
20:00	Murofushi 10', 64'; Adam 33'; Kamata 72'	Report	Azwan Ali 87'

== See also ==
- 2017 DPMM FC season
