= Shah Razen Said =

Bruneian footballer

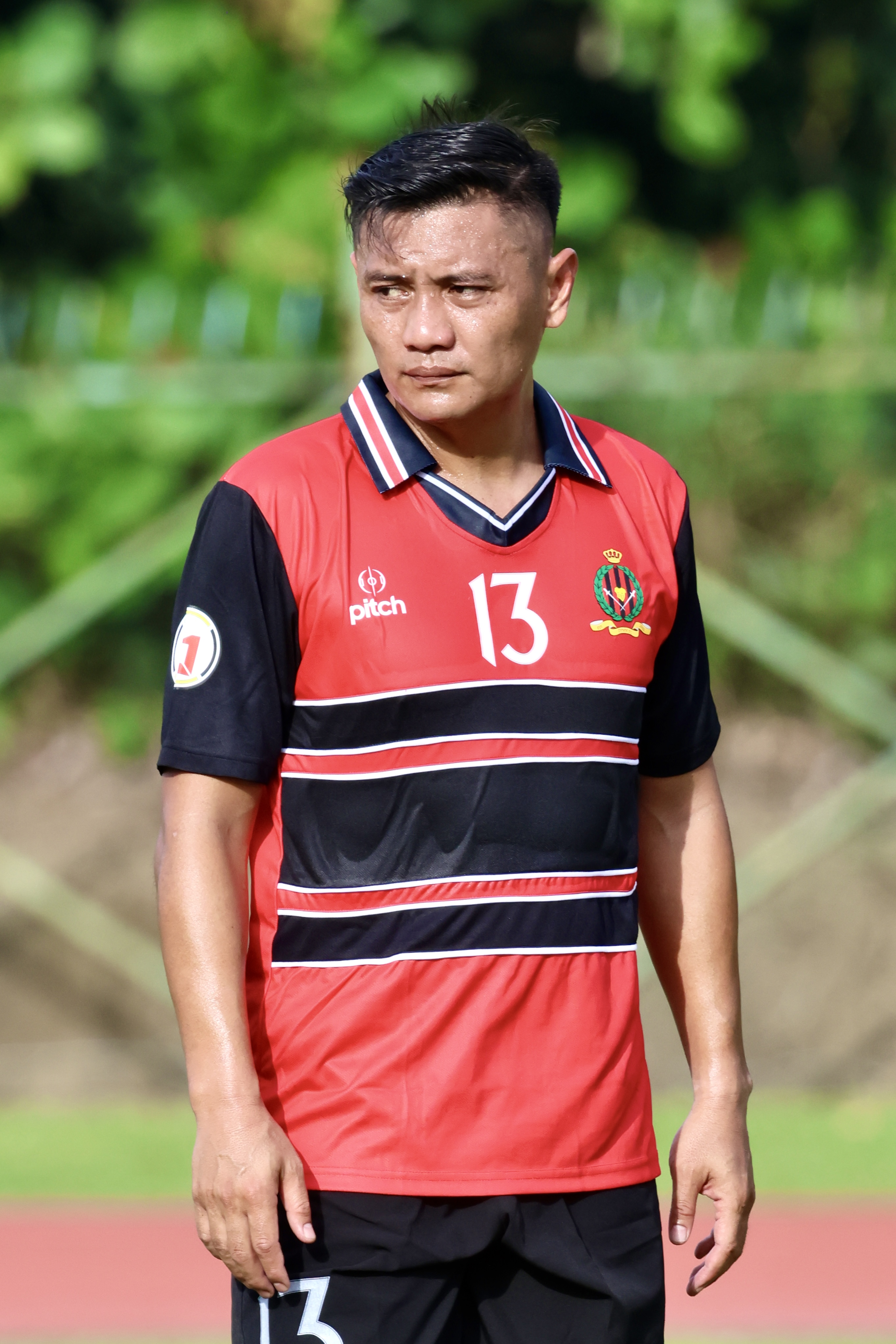
- Shah Razen with DPMM II in 2025

Personal information
- Full name: Mohammad Shah Razen bin Said
- Date of birth: 14 December 1985 (age 40)
- Place of birth: Brunei
- Height: 1.71 m (5 ft 7 1/2 in)
- Position: Striker

Senior career*
| Years | Team | Apps | (Gls) |
| 2003–2005 | AH United | | (14+) |
| 2005–2022 | DPMM | 169+ | (69) |
| 2010 | → Viva Rangers (loan) | 0 | (0) |
| 2011 | → Wijaya (loan) | | |
| 2023–2024 | Kasuka | 9 | (3) |
| 2025 | DPMM II | 3 | (0) |

International career^{‡}
| 2005 | Brunei U21 | | |
| 2008 | Brunei U23 | | |
| 2008–2019 | Brunei | 24 | (8) |
- * Club domestic league appearances and goals as of 25 November 2025 ‡ National team caps and goals as of 27 July 2022

Mohammad Shah Razen bin Said (born 14 December 1985) is a Bruneian former footballer and current coach who played as a striker. The eldest of a family that produced nine male footballers, he rose to stardom with DPMM FC playing in the Malaysia Super League as the joint top scorer of the 2006–07 season.

== Club career ==
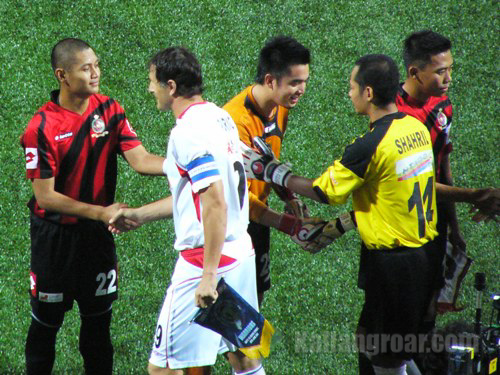
Shah Razen with DPMM during the 2009 Singapore League Cup Final

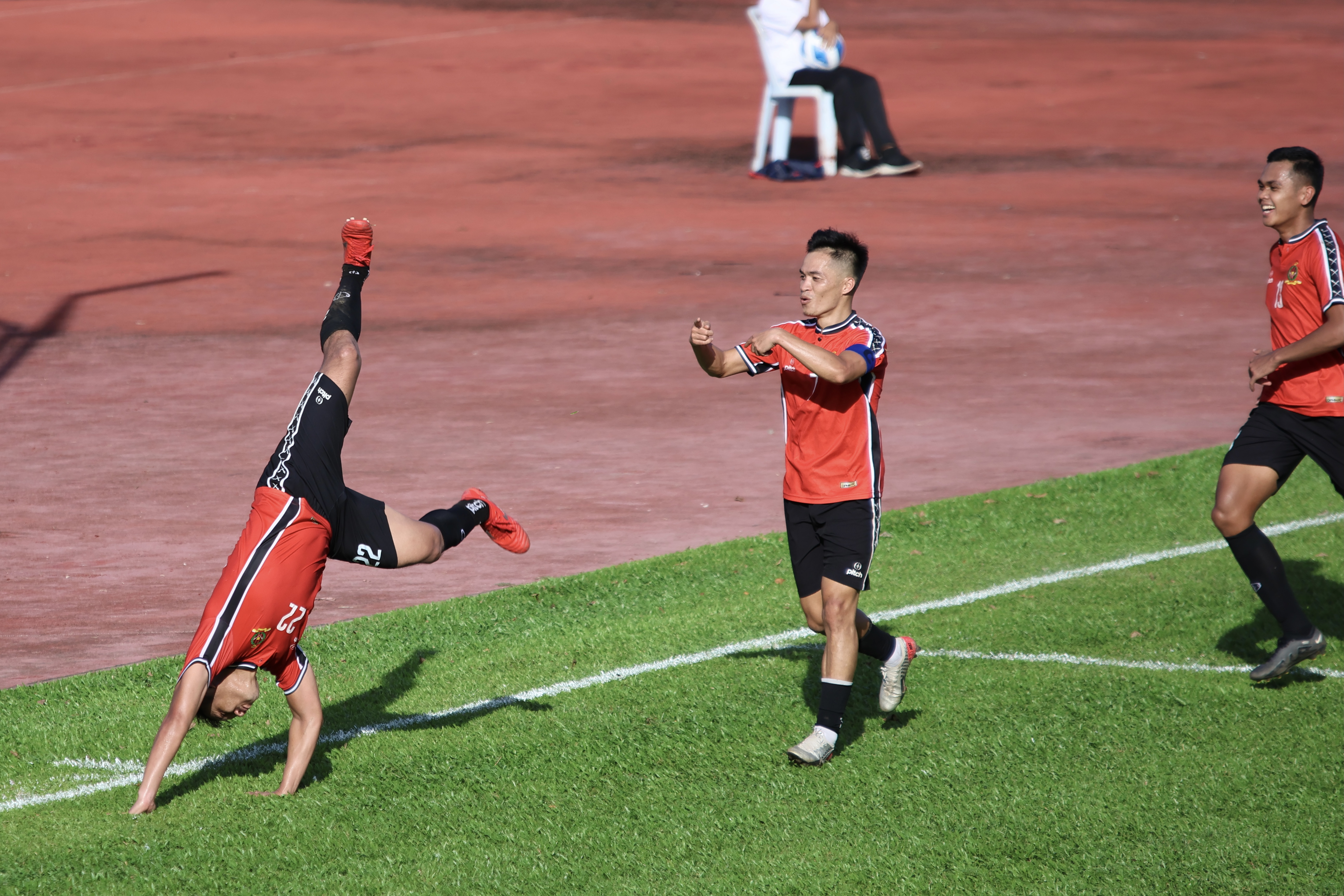
Shah Razen celebrating after scoring a goal during the 2022 FA Cup Final

Besides DPMM, Shah Razen has also played for AH United, non-league Viva Rangers, Wijaya FC, as well as a short trial with Indian club Sporting Clube de Goa. He was also Brunei's top scorer in the 2006-07 Malaysia Super League with 21 goals, back when DPMM were playing in the Malaysian Premier League. When DPMM joined the S.League starting in 2009, Shah Razen helped the club to win the Singapore League Cup twice, in 2009 and 2012.

He was used sparingly by Steve Kean in the 2014 campaign, only starting two games and notching two goals as the team won the League Cup for the third time and only missing out on the S.League title in the final round of fixtures. In the 2014 close season, he was poised to join Perak FA, which would have linked him up with former manager Vjeran Simunić who was then the Perak FA manager. The move did not materialise.

On 10 June 2021, Shah Razen stated in an Instagram post that the upcoming 2021 Brunei Super League season would be his last one in DPMM stripes. He made his first appearance of the season against Rimba Star FC on 4 July, coming on to replace Andrey Varankow. He managed to get a hat-trick to contribute to a 15–0 victory. This was his first hat-trick since 14 February 2007 against NS Naza in the 2006–07 Malaysia Super League.

On 4 December 2022, Shah Razen scored the winning goal in a 2–1 victory over Kasuka FC in the final of the 2022 Brunei FA Cup, to end a remarkable season in which he scored a total of 19 goals in the competition. Shah Razen ended his 17-year stay at DPMM in 2023 and joined Kasuka, reuniting him with his brother Adi. He scored on his debut in the opening match of the 2023 Brunei Super League on 3 March against MS PPDB which finished 4–0. On 17 November, Shah Razen gained his first local championship medal with Kasuka after being undefeated in all of their matches.

Shah Razen came back to DPMM in 2025, lacing up for the team that plays in the Brunei Super League. He made his DPMM II debut on 19 January against Jerudong FC in a 5–0 win. On 6 April, he scored a hat-trick in a 12–0 win over PKT FT in the 2025 Brunei FA Cup. DPMM II would go on to win the cup on 18 May.

== International career ==
After turning out for the host nation in the 2005 Hassanal Bolkiah Trophy with the Under-21s and the 2008 Sukma Games with the Under-23s, Shah Razen's first involvement with Skuad Tebuan came in November 2008, when the team was represented by his club DPMM for the 2008 AFF Suzuki Cup qualification in Cambodia. He scored 17 minutes into his debut against the Philippines on 19 October, followed by a brace against Timor-Leste two days later. However, Brunei failed to qualify for the tournament proper.

Shah Razen prominently featured over the next three qualifying campaigns in 2012, 2014 and 2016. He scored a penalty in a 4–0 win over Timor-Leste at the 2016 AFC Solidarity Cup held in Kuching, Malaysia. He also opened the scoring in the competition's semi-final stage against Macau but the game eventually finished 1–1. Despite putting away his spot-kick, Brunei crashed out 4–3 in penalties. He scored two goals and became the leading goalscorer for Brunei in the 3–2 loss against Laos in the resulting third-place play-off. At the conclusion of the inaugural tournament, he was awarded the tournament's top scorer with four goals and one assist to his name.

In September 2018, Shah Razen was selected for the two-legged 2018 AFF Suzuki Cup qualifying matches against Timor-Leste. He started both games as Brunei failed to advance to the competition proper, losing 2–3 on aggregate.

The following year, Shah Razen accepted another national team callup for the 2022 World Cup qualification matches against Mongolia to be held home and away in June. He was played in central midfield by Robbie Servais for both matches. Despite his and the team's collective efforts, the Wasps were eliminated from the 2022 World Cup and also the 2023 AFC Asian Cup by virtue of a 2–3 aggregate loss.

== Coaching career ==
Shah Razen currently runs Wasps Academy, a grassroots football programme alongside his contemporaries Sairol Sahari and Wardun Yussof.

== Statistics ==
=== International goals ===
| Goal | Date | Venue | Opponent | Score | Result | Competition |
|---|---|---|---|---|---|---|
| 1. | 19 October 2008 | National Olympic Stadium, Phnom Penh, Cambodia | Philippines | 1–0 | 1–1 | 2008 AFF Suzuki Cup qualification |
| 2. | 21 October 2008 | National Olympic Stadium, Phnom Penh, Cambodia | Timor-Leste | 1–0 | 4–1 | 2008 AFF Suzuki Cup qualification |
| 3. | 21 October 2008 | National Olympic Stadium, Phnom Penh, Cambodia | Timor-Leste | 2–0 | 4–1 | 2008 AFF Suzuki Cup qualification |
| 4. | 14 October 2014 | New Laos National Stadium, Vientiane, Laos | Laos | 2–4 | 2–4 | 2014 AFF Suzuki Cup qualification |
| 5. | 2 November 2016 | Sarawak Stadium, Kuching, Malaysia | Timor-Leste | 3–0 | 4–0 | 2016 AFC Solidarity Cup |
| 6. | 12 November 2016 | Sarawak Stadium, Kuching, Malaysia | Macau | 1–0 | 1–1 | 2016 AFC Solidarity Cup |
| 7. | 14 November 2016 | Sarawak Stadium, Kuching, Malaysia | Laos | 1–1 | 2–3 | 2016 AFC Solidarity Cup |
| 8. | 14 November 2016 | Sarawak Stadium, Kuching, Malaysia | Laos | 2–2 | 2–3 | 2016 AFC Solidarity Cup |

== Honours ==
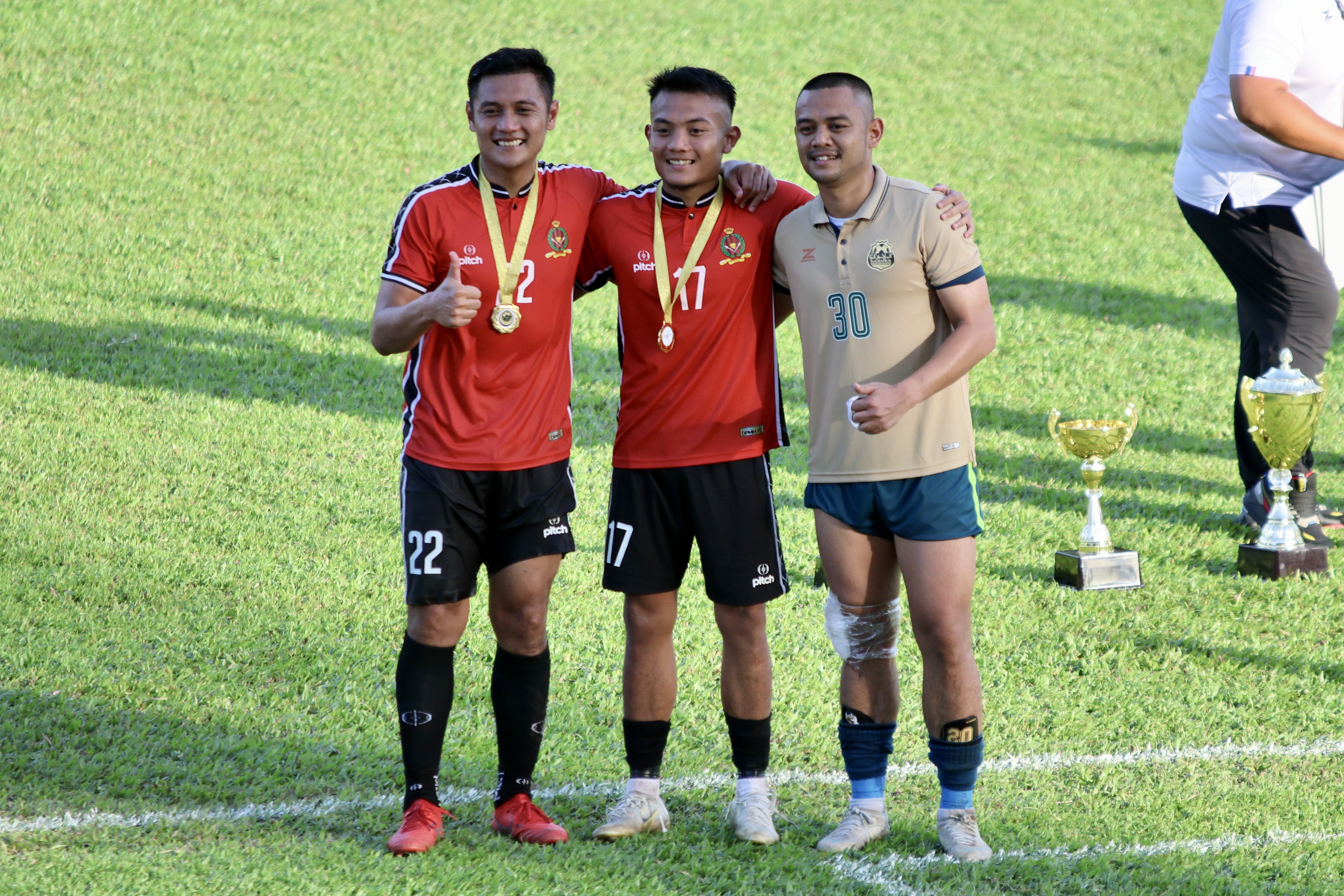
Shah Razen, Hakeme and Adi together after the 2022 FA Cup Final

DPMM

- S.League: 2015
- Singapore Premier League: 2019
- Singapore League Cup: 2009, 2012, 2014
- Brunei FA Cup (2): 2022, 2025

Kasuka

- Brunei Super League: 2023

Individual

- 2006–07 Malaysia Super League Golden Boot (21 goals)
- 2016 AFC Solidarity Cup Top Scorer (4 goals)
- IFFHS Brunei All Time Dream Team: 2021

== Personal life ==
Shah Razen has four brothers who have represented Brunei in addition to appearing for DPMM FC, namely Adi, Amalul, Ahmad Hafiz and Hakeme Yazid. He also has four other footballing brothers: former Rimba Star players Abdul Azim and Amirul Sabqi, former Menglait FC player Amiruddin Nizam, former MS ABDB player Abdul Mateen.
