= Amalul Said =

Bruneian footballer

Personal information
- Full name: Mohammad Amalul Ariffin Shah bin Said
- Date of birth: 11 July 1987 (age 39)
- Place of birth: Brunei
- Position: Defender

Team information
- Current team: Jerudong FC
- Number: 27

Senior career*
Years	Team	Apps	(Gls)
2005–2007	AH United		
2007–2011	MS ABDB		
2012–2016	DPMM	5	(0)
2016–2020	Kota Ranger		(6)
2022	Ar Rawda		(2)
2023	Kota Ranger	4	(1)
2026–	Jerudong	1	(0)

International career^{‡}
2005	Brunei U20		
2008–2017	Brunei	3	(0)
- * Club domestic league appearances and goals as of 26 January 2026 ‡ National team caps and goals as of 30 November 2017

Mohammad Amalul Ariffin Shah bin Said (born 11 July 1987) is a Bruneian footballer who plays as a defender for Jerudong FC of the Brunei Super League. He has played for professional club Brunei DPMM FC (alongside brothers Shah Razen and Adi) as well as local powerhouses MS ABDB where he had won two FA Cup medals.

== Club career ==
Amalul started his career alongside his brother Shah Razen at AH United, a club that fielded established national team players such as Sallehuddin Damit and Fadlin Galawat. He won his first Brunei FA Cup medal after a penalty shootout against the Armed Forces on 13 March 2006.

Amalul transferred to the Royal Brunei Armed Forces Sports Council in the 2007-08 season. The Armymen finished runners-up to QAF FC in the league in his first season there, but won the FA Cup instead. On 17 April 2010, Amalul opened the scoring against eventual league winners QAF at the 2010 DST FA Cup final which MS ABDB won 2–1, the winner scored by Rosmin Kamis.

Amalul's impressive league form led to an invite to train with royalty-owned Brunei DPMM FC in preparation for the 2012 S.League, where Shah Razen was currently playing. He signed full terms in February 2012, on the same day as his younger brother Adi.

Although Adi progressed well at DPMM, it was the reverse for Amalul who endured a tough spell at the club, primarily unable to displace Subhi Bakir at his preferred right-back role. His first (and only) appearance in 2012 was as a late substitute against Gombak United on 31 August which finished 1–1. He went through 2013 without playing a single game, but managed to register four appearances in the first half of the 2014 S.League under new head coach Steve Kean. He made the first eleven in the 6–1 win against Young Lions on 6 April, which would ultimately be his only start for DPMM. Another season without any appearances followed, and Amalul was released in early 2016 after failing S.League's mandatory fitness test.

Amalul joined Kota Ranger FC later that year. He scored a hattrick in the league fixture against Najip-BAKES on 9 December 2018. In the final of the 2018–19 Brunei FA Cup, Amalul scored the first goal of the game in the 36th minute, repeating his feat nine years earlier. Kota Ranger won 2–1 at the end, bringing Amalul his fourth FA Cup medal.

== International career ==
Amalul played for Brunei under-20s at the 2005 AFF U-20 Youth Championship that was held in Indonesia. Three years later, he made his senior international debut at the 2008 AFC Challenge Cup qualifying. He was a second-half substitute in a 0–1 loss against the home side, the Philippines.

Amalul was left out of the Brunei squad for the 2012 AFF Suzuki Cup qualifying campaign, which was Brunei's first international outing in three years after enduring a FIFA suspension. He was included in the 2014 edition however, and made two substitute appearances against Myanmar and Cambodia, both on the losing side.

After becoming a regular for his club Kota Ranger FC, Amalul was recalled to the national team after five years in December 2017 for the 2017 Aceh World Solidarity Tsunami Cup.

== Honours ==
AH United

- Brunei FA Cup: 2005–06

MS ABDB

- Brunei FA Cup (2): 2008, 2010

DPMM FC

- Singapore League Cup (2): 2012, 2014
- S.League: 2015

Kota Ranger FC

- Brunei FA Cup: 2018–19
- Piala Sumbangsih : 2020

== Personal life ==
Amalul has eight brothers who are all footballers. Notable ones are Shah Razen the eldest, Adi and Hakeme Yazid the youngest, all of them are playing or have played for Amalul's former team DPMM FC.
