= Brian McLean =

Scottish footballer (born 1985)

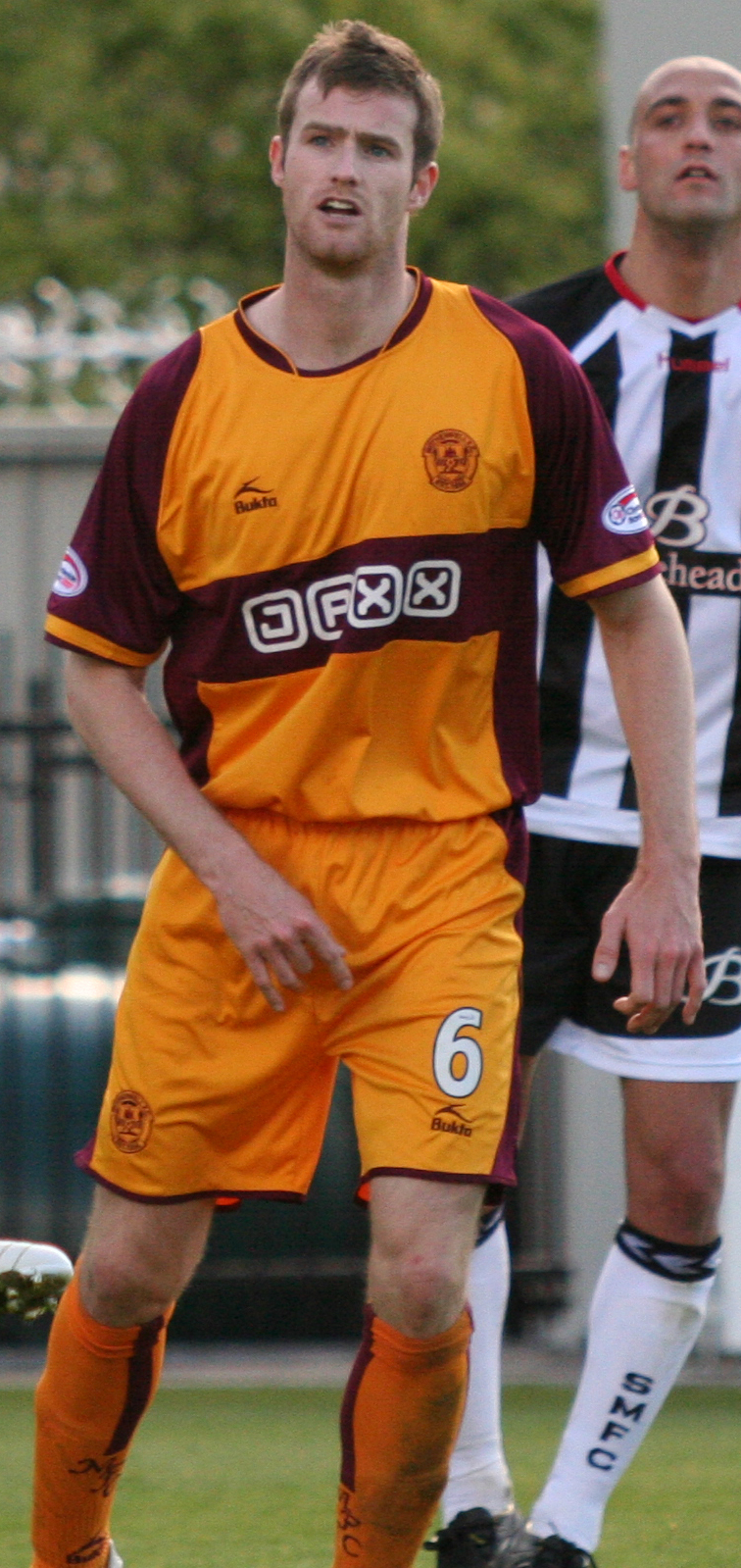
- McLean playing for Motherwell

Personal information
- Full name: Brian Stuart McLean
- Date of birth: 28 February 1985 (age 41)
- Place of birth: Rutherglen, Scotland
- Positions: Centre-back; full-back

Youth career
- Queen's Park
- Rangers

Senior career*
Years	Team	Apps	(Gls)
2001–2006	Rangers	0	(0)
2005–2006	→ Motherwell (loan)	30	(3)
2006–2009	Motherwell	25	(2)
2009–2011	Falkirk	67	(3)
2011–2012	Preston North End	16	(1)
2012–2013	Dundee United	29	(0)
2013–2014	Ross County	26	(0)
2015–2016	DPMM FC	46	(5)
2017	Hibernian	2	(0)
2017	ÍBV	10	(1)
2018	DPMM FC	22	(2)
2019	Dumbarton	7	(0)
2019–2022	Greenock Morton	54	(1)
2022–2023	Clyde	31	(0)

International career
	Scotland U17	1	(0)
2005	Northern Ireland U21	1	(0)
2006	Northern Ireland	1	(0)

Managerial career
- 2023: Clyde
- * Club domestic league appearances and goals as of 16:23, 10 July 2023 (UTC)

Brian Stuart McLean (born 28 February 1985) is a football manager and former player. He is currently Emerging Talent and Loans manager at Kilmarnock F.C.. He was previously manager of Scottish League Two club Clyde.

He began his career in Scotland as a youth and reserve player with Rangers before joining Motherwell in 2005, initially on loan. He then joined Falkirk in 2009 before joining Preston North End in England two years later. After returning to Scotland with Dundee United and then Ross County, he moved to DPMM FC in 2015 and won the S.League title in his first season. He then had a short spell at Hibernian and played in Iceland for ÍBV before returning for a second spell at DPMM FC in 2018. He returned to Scottish football at Dumbarton, where he spent the 2018–19 season, then signed for Greenock Morton in July 2019.

McLean played for the Scotland under-17 team before choosing to represent Northern Ireland, for whom he made one full international appearance in 2006. Due to an administrative error, however, he was subsequently declared ineligible to have switched his nationality, thus ending his international career.

== Club career ==
McLean was primarily a centre-back, but he could also play at full-back. Born in Rutherglen, he started his career as a youth player with Queen's Park before joining Rangers. However, a lack of first team opportunities led to him joining Motherwell on loan during the 2005–06 season. During his loan spell, he won the Scottish Premier League Young Player of the Month award for March 2006. Motherwell signed him on a permanent basis in April 2006 after he impressed during his loan spell.

On 18 July 2008, he suffered significant damage to his knee in a tackle by Argentinian striker Diego Alejandro Ruíz during a pre-season friendly against CFR Cluj. He resumed a first team place on 28 March 2009, in a 2–1 win over Inverness Caledonian Thistle.

On 1 July 2009, he signed a two-year contract with Scottish Premier League side Falkirk. He became Eddie May's first signing, but Falkirk were relegated to the First Division in 2010. McLean left Falkirk at the end of the 2010–11 season.

McLean was signed by Football League One club Preston North End on a two-year contract, after a trial period, on 2 August 2011. McLean scored his first goal for Preston North End against Notts County from a Paul Parry corner, heading in from about six yards out. He was transfer listed by the club in May 2012.

He signed a two-year deal with Dundee United on 14 June 2012. On 25 July 2013, it was announced McLean had left Dundee United by mutual consent; he later signed for Ross County on 30 July 2013. He left Ross County at the end of the 2013–14 season.

On 16 February 2015, McLean signed for DPMM FC, a Bruneian football team playing in Singapore's S.League. He scored his first goal for the club against Hougang United on 4 April. He won the S.League title in his first season, scoring in every competition that he played in. He was released at the end of the 2016 season.

On 1 March 2017, McLean signed for Hibernian on a short-term contract. He left the club when it expired at the end of the season two months later.

After a spell in Iceland with ÍBV where he won the Icelandic Cup, he made a return to DPMM FC of Brunei in February 2018. He left the team once again after the season ended and signed a short-term deal with Scottish League One side Dumbarton in March 2019. He turned down the offer of a new deal with the club in May 2019.

McLean signed a one-year contract with Greenock Morton in July 2019. After three seasons with Morton, McLean played for Clyde during the 2022–23 season.

== International career ==
Despite being born in Scotland, McLean was eligible to play for Northern Ireland through his family. However, he had previously appeared for Scotland U17s in a UEFA competition in 2002, and was required to state his change of allegiance prior to his 21st birthday. Unfortunately, due to an administration error McLean was not registered before this deadline and is now ineligible to represent Northern Ireland, effectively ending his international career. During his short international career McLean did not appear in any competitive games, although he was due to play in the European Under-21 Championship qualifying game against Liechtenstein before being ruled ineligible.

== Coaching career ==
=== Clyde ===
McLean became a player-coach at Clyde during the 2022–23 season. He was then appointed as their new manager on 2 June 2023, replacing Jim Duffy. Four months later, after a run of one win in 15 matches, McLean left the club with immediate effect. They were ninth in the league table at the time of his departure.

== Personal life ==
He is the son of former Kilmarnock player Stuart McLean and the brother of SFA referee Steven McLean.

== Career statistics ==
As of 17 April 2021

Appearances and goals by club, season and competition
Club	Season	League			National cup		League cup		Other		Total	
Club	Season	Division	Apps	Goals	Apps	Goals	Apps	Goals	Apps	Goals	Apps	Goals
Rangers	2004–05	Scottish Premier League	0	0	0	0	0	0	0	0	0	0
Rangers	2005–06	Scottish Premier League	0	0	0	0	0	0	0	0	0	0
Rangers	Total		0	0	0	0	0	0	0	0	0	0
Motherwell (loan)	2005–06	Scottish Premier League	30	3	1	0	3	0	0	0	34	3
Motherwell	2006–07	Scottish Premier League	4	0	0	0	0	0	0	0	4	0
Motherwell	2007–08	Scottish Premier League	9	0	1	0	1	1	0	0	11	1
Motherwell	2008–09	Scottish Premier League	12	2	0	0	0	0	0	0	12	2
Motherwell	Total		25	2	1	0	1	1	0	0	27	3
Falkirk	2009–10	Scottish Premier League	36	1	1	0	1	0	2 (Note: Appearances in the UEFA Europa League)	0	40	1
Falkirk	2010–11	Scottish First Division	31	2	2	0	3	0	0	0	36	2
Falkirk	Total		67	3	3	0	4	0	2	0	76	3
Preston North End	2011–12	Football League One	16	1	0	0	1	0	1 (Note: Appearance in the Football League Trophy)	1	18	2
Dundee United	2012–13	Scottish Premier League	29	0	2	1	2	0	1	0	34	1
Ross County	2013–14	Scottish Premiership	26	0	1	0	1	0	0	0	28	0
DPMM FC	2015	S.League	24	2	5	1	3	1	0	0	32	4
DPMM FC	2016	S.League	22	3	2	1	5	0	0	0	29	4
DPMM FC	Total		46	5	7	2	8	1	0	0	61	8
Hibernian	2016–17	Scottish Championship	2	0	0	0	0	0	0	0	2	0
ÍBV	2017	Úrvalsdeild	10	1	2	0	0	0	0	0	12	1
DPMM FC	2018	Singapore Premier League	22	2	5	1	0	0	0	0	27	3
Dumbarton	2018–19	Scottish League One	7	0	0	0	0	0	0	0	7	0
Greenock Morton	2019–20	Scottish Championship	11	1	1	0	3	0	1 (Note: Appearance in the Scottish Challenge Cup)	0	16	1
Greenock Morton	2020–21	Scottish Championship	20	0	3	0	3	0	0	0	26	0
Greenock Morton	Total		31	1	4	0	6	0	1	0	42	1
Career total			311	18	26	4	26	2	5	1	368	25

== Managerial statistics ==
As of match played 21 October 2023

Team	From	To	Record				
Team	From	To	G	W	D	L	Win %
Clyde	2 June 2023	22 October 2023	15	1	3	11	6.67
Total			15	1	3	11	6.67

== Honours ==
DPMM FC

- Singaporean S.League: 2015

ÍBV

- Icelandic Cup: 2017

Individual

- Scottish Premier League Young Player of the Month: March 2006

== See also ==
- List of sportspeople who competed for more than one nation
