= Adi Said =

Bruneian footballer

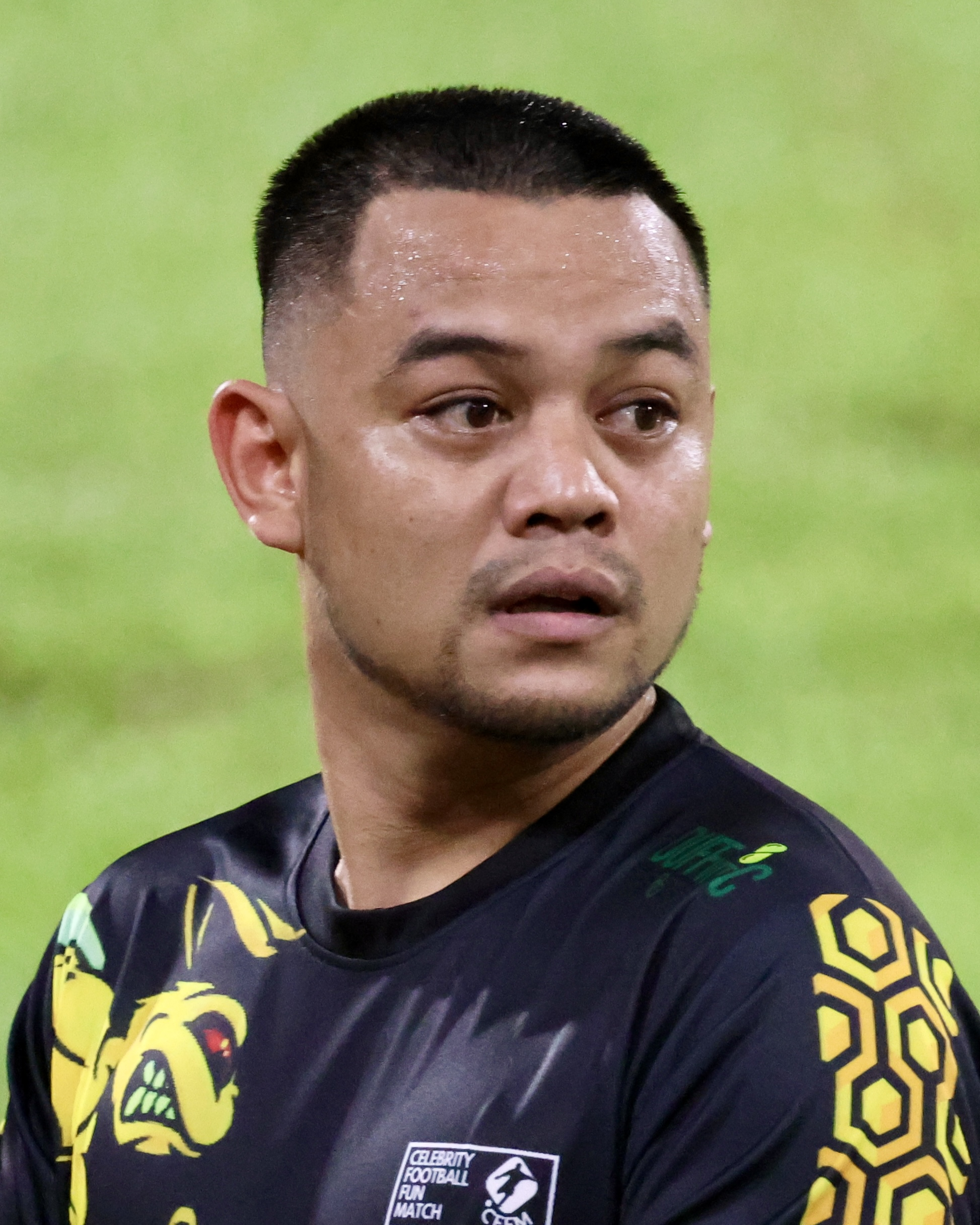
- Adi in 2024

Personal information
- Full name: Adi bin Said
- Date of birth: 15 October 1990 (age 36)
- Place of birth: Rimba, Brunei
- Height: 1.68 m (5 ft 6 in)
- Position: Striker

Team information
- Current team: Kasuka
- Number: 30

Youth career
- Manggis United

Senior career*
Years	Team	Apps	(Gls)
2007–2011	Majra		
2012–2018	DPMM	107	(28)
2019	UiTM	13	(2)
2019	DPMM	9	(4)
2020–2021	Kota Ranger	9	(15)
2022–	Kasuka	29	(35)

International career^{‡}
2011–2014	Brunei U21	10	(11)
2011–2019	Brunei U23	10	(3)
2012–	Brunei	30	(7)
- * Club domestic league appearances and goals as of 21 April 2026 ‡ National team caps and goals as of 15 June 2026

Adi bin Said (born 15 October 1990) is a Bruneian professional footballer who plays as a striker for Brunei Super League club Kasuka. He has played in Malaysia.

== Club career ==
=== Early career and rise at DPMM FC ===
Adi joined newly promoted Majra FC in 2007 and played for them in the Brunei Premier League until 2012, when his exploits on the international scene attracted Brunei's sole professional club DPMM FC to sign him for the 2012 S.League season. He scored his first goal for DPMM against Warriors FC on 23 June that year.

Adi saw much playing time as a substitute in the following season, but the squad played underwhelmingly and finished in eighth place, costing Vjeran Simunic his job. Adi's new coach Steve Kean in contrast was more reluctant to utilise him, restricting Adi to only 10 appearances in the 2014 S.League. However, he made most of his chances count, scoring in the final of the League Cup, and netting two braces against Hougang United and Woodlands Wellington in an August purple patch.

After a quiet 2015, Adi was given starts in all of DPMM's domestic cup matches for the 2016 campaign. He scored with a direct free kick in a 2–1 win over Tampines Rovers in the 2016 Singapore League Cup on 21 July.

Adi scored 8 goals in all competitions in a largely disappointing 2017, to finish behind Rafael Ramazotti in the club's goalscoring tally for the year. The following season, Adi started ahead of elder brother and new captain Shahrazen in a new 4-3-3 formation deployed by Brazilian coach Renê Weber. Adi finished the season with 11 goals and 10 assists, making him joint-top assist-maker of the league, the other being Riku Moriyasu of Albirex Niigata (S).

=== UiTM FC ===
After a successful trial in December 2018 (including scoring a hat-trick in a friendly), Adi signed a one-year contract with Malaysia Premier League side UiTM FC, becoming the first Bruneian local-born expatriate footballer ever. He scored within twenty seconds of his debut in a 1–3 victory against PDRM FA on 1 February, managing to get into the scoresheet twice. After two goals and six assists, he was released by UiTM FC in late May.

=== Back to DPMM ===
Two months later, Adi returned to DPMM FC and made his first appearance since coming back in the 3–3 draw against Warriors FC on 6 July. He scored his first goal since his return in the 3–0 victory over Geylang International on 2 August, in a game where his younger brother Hakeme debuted for the first team and shared a scoresheet with. He netted a brace in the penultimate league fixture which was a 5–4 home win against Hougang United on 29 September.

=== Kota Ranger ===
At the start of the 2020 Brunei Super League, Adi left DPMM to join Kota Ranger FC, reuniting him with his brother Amalul Said. He also became the team captain, taking over from Afi Aminuddin. He made his debut at the 2020 Piala Sumbangsih on 8 February, scoring a hat-trick against MS ABDB. A month later, he scored a brace in Kota Ranger's first fixture of the 2020 Brunei Super League, a 7–0 win over Setia Perdana on 2 March. However after scoring yet another goal against IKLS-MB5 the following week, the league was stopped and discontinued due to the COVID-19 pandemic.

Due to a period without an internal COVID-19 outbreak the 2021 Brunei Super League was held in June and Adi scored in all of the six matches played by Kota Ranger including five goals against Panchor Murai as well as a hat-trick against Kuala Belait until August when the league was abandoned yet again due to the reappearance of COVID-19 inside the country.

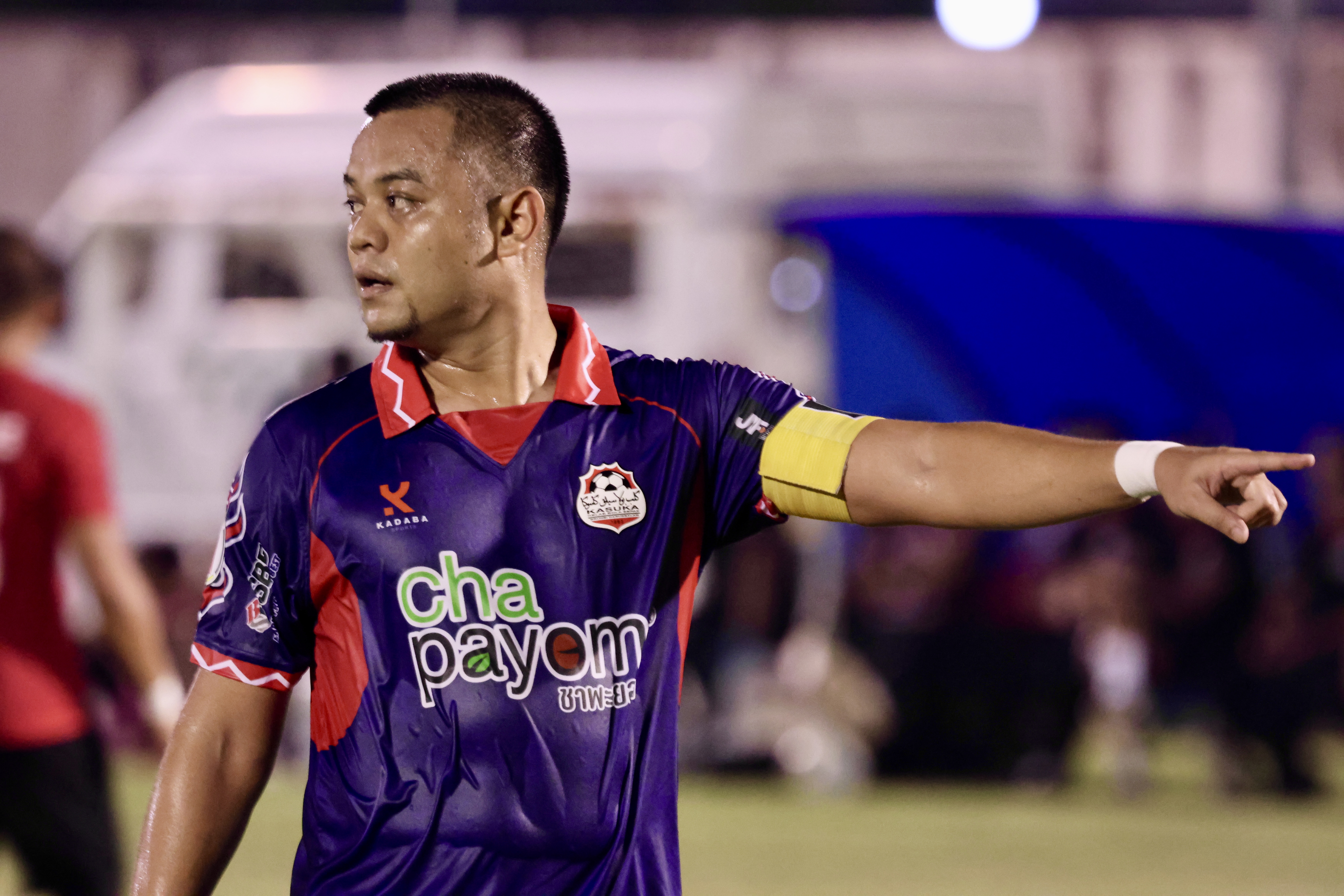
Adi with Kasuka playing in an exhibition match, 2024

=== Kasuka ===
Adi signed for Kasuka FC in time for the 2022 Brunei FA Cup season. He scored a brace on his debut against Lun Bawang FC in a 13–0 victory on 7 August. He followed this with four goals in the next fixture against Dagang FT. He scored a total of 20 goals en route to the final of the competition where he faced off against his former club DPMM FC in a losing effort, 2–1 at the Track & Field Sports Complex on 4 December.

Adi scored the first goal of the 2023 Brunei Super League against MS PPDB on 3 March, which finished 4–0. On 25 June, he scored a hat-trick in an 8–1 win over Jerudong FC. A month later against Wijaya FC, he scored twice in the first half when the match was postponed due to heavy rain seven minutes after the restart. The match resumed on 2 August when he scored a penalty and finished the match 8–1, in doing so became the footballer who achieved the longest hat-trick ever. At the conclusion of the league, Adi gained his first local championship medal after propelling Kasuka to the league title unbeaten, scoring 23 goals in 15 appearances.

In the first game for Kasuka as defending champions in the 2024–25 season on 1 September 2024, Adi scored a hat-trick against Lun Bawang to help his side gain a 9–0 victory. He netted 12 goals for the season as Kasuka won their second championship in a row by beating DPMM II 2–3 in the final fixture on 2 February 2025.

== International career ==
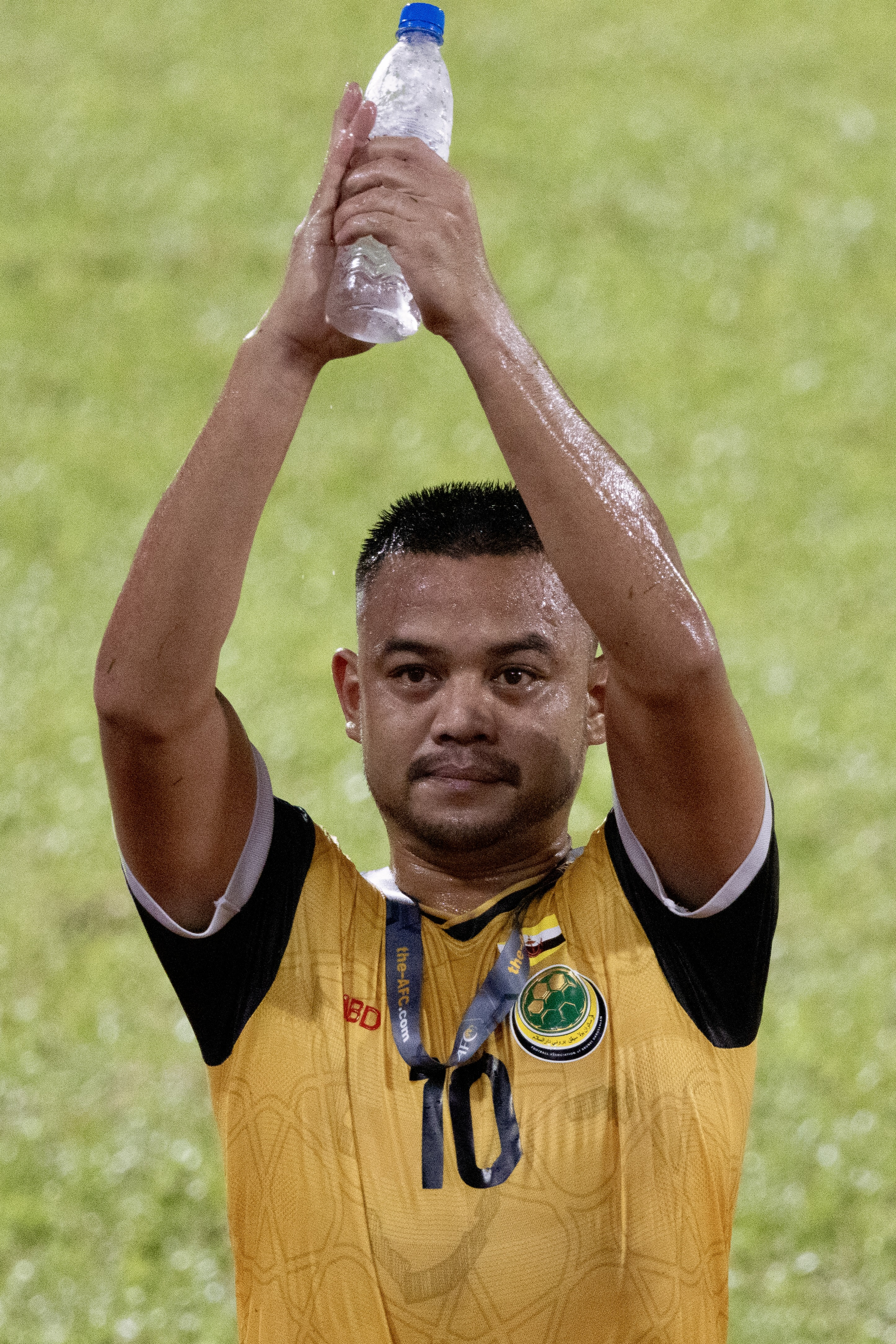
Adi with Brunei in 2023

Like his brother Shah Razen Said, Adi became an undisputed starter in the forward position for the Brunei national team at various levels.

At the 26th SEA Games, Adi was selected for the Brunei national under-23 football team, where he scored 3 goals in 5 appearances. He captained the same side in 2013, although failing to convert in 4 outings.

Adi played a starring role in helping the Brunei under-21s win the 2012 edition of the Hassanal Bolkiah Trophy, a tournament for the national under-21 teams of the ASEAN Football Federation. He scored 5 goals, scoring in every game to become joint top scorer with Indonesia's Andik Vermansyah. In the 2014 tournament, he was picked as one of the 5 permitted overage players and once again became the top scorer with 6 goals, despite being eliminated in the group stage.

Adi was selected for the Brunei squad at the 2012 AFF Suzuki Cup qualification, where he scored his first senior international goal against Timor-Leste. He was selected again for the 2014 edition, netting twice. He scored the winning goal in Brunei's first ever victory in World Cup qualification, versus Chinese Taipei in the first leg of the 2018 World Cup qualifying first round for AFC.

Despite his irregular club form, Adi was selected for the 2016 AFF Suzuki Cup qualification matches held in Cambodia in October. He scored the first goal against Timor-Leste in Brunei's first group match, which went 2–1 to the Wasps. He also began the scoring in the third game against Laos but this time Brunei lost 4–3.

Adi was back in the starting lineup for the 2016 AFC Solidarity Cup held a fortnight later in neighbouring Sarawak, Malaysia. He scored from a direct free-kick in the 4–0 win over Timor-Leste. In the semi-final against Macau, he was sacrificed when fielding the replacement goalkeeper after Wardun Yussof was sent off in the 55th minute. Brunei lost 4–3 on penalties in the end.

Adi laced up for the national team at the 2018 AFF Suzuki Cup qualifying matches against Timor-Leste held in early September. Adi made appearances in both legs as Brunei failed to progress to the Suzuki Cup group stages with a 2–3 aggregate score.

Adi was selected for the two-legged 2022 World Cup qualification matches against Mongolia in June 2019. He started the first leg in Ulanbaatar which finished 2–0 to the Blue Wolves. In the second leg, Adi fired in a long-range free-kick which was parried to the path of Razimie Ramlli for Brunei's second goal to level the tie on aggregate. Unfortunately Mongolia subsequently scored a penalty to knock Brunei out of the 2022 World Cup and also the 2023 Asian Cup.

In November 2022, Brunei finally managed to qualify for the 2022 AFF Championship via a 6–3 aggregate win over Timor-Leste in the qualifying round. Adi made two substitute appearances, creating two goals in the first leg. He donned the Brunei jersey a total of three times in the actual tournament, but failed to make an influence as Brunei lost all of their matches in the group stage.

Adi received a call-up for the two-legged 2026 World Cup qualification matches against Indonesia in October 2023. Adi managed two substitute appearances but failed to exert his influence as Brunei were defeated 0–12 on aggregate.

Despite announcing his retirement from the national team after 2023, he accepted a return to the national team in May 2025 for the 2027 AFC Asian Cup qualifying match against Lebanon. He played as a starter, leading the attack with Nazirrudin Ismail just behind. Both players lasted 75 minutes on the pitch as Lebanon were eventual winners, beating the Wasps 5–0.

On 9 June 2026, Adi made a late cameo in a 3–1 loss to Timor-Leste at the second leg of the 2026 ASEAN Championship qualification.

=== International goals ===
Scores and results list Brunei's goal tally first.

Goal	Date	Venue	Opponent	Score	Result	Competition
1.	13 October 2012	Thuwunna Stadium, Yangon, Myanmar	Timor-Leste	1–0	2–1	2012 AFF Suzuki Cup qualification
2.	12 October 2014	New Laos National Stadium, Vientiane, Laos	Timor-Leste	1–1	2–4	2014 AFF Suzuki Cup qualification
3.	16 October 2014	New Laos National Stadium, Vientiane, Laos	Myanmar	1–2	1–3	2014 AFF Suzuki Cup qualification
4.	12 March 2015	National Stadium, Kaohsiung, Taiwan	Chinese Taipei	1–0	1–0	2018 FIFA World Cup qualification
5.	15 October 2016	Olympic Stadium, Phnom Penh, Cambodia	Timor-Leste	1–1	2–1	2016 AFF Suzuki Cup qualification
6.	21 October 2016	RSN Stadium, Phnom Penh, Cambodia	Laos	1–0	3–4	2016 AFF Suzuki Cup qualification
7.	2 November 2016	Sarawak Stadium, Kuching, Malaysia	Timor-Leste	4–0	4–0	2016 AFC Solidarity Cup
	7 September 2023	Track and Field Sports Complex, Bandar Seri Begawan, Brunei	(Malaysia) Sabah FC	1–1	1–3	Unofficial friendly

== Honours ==
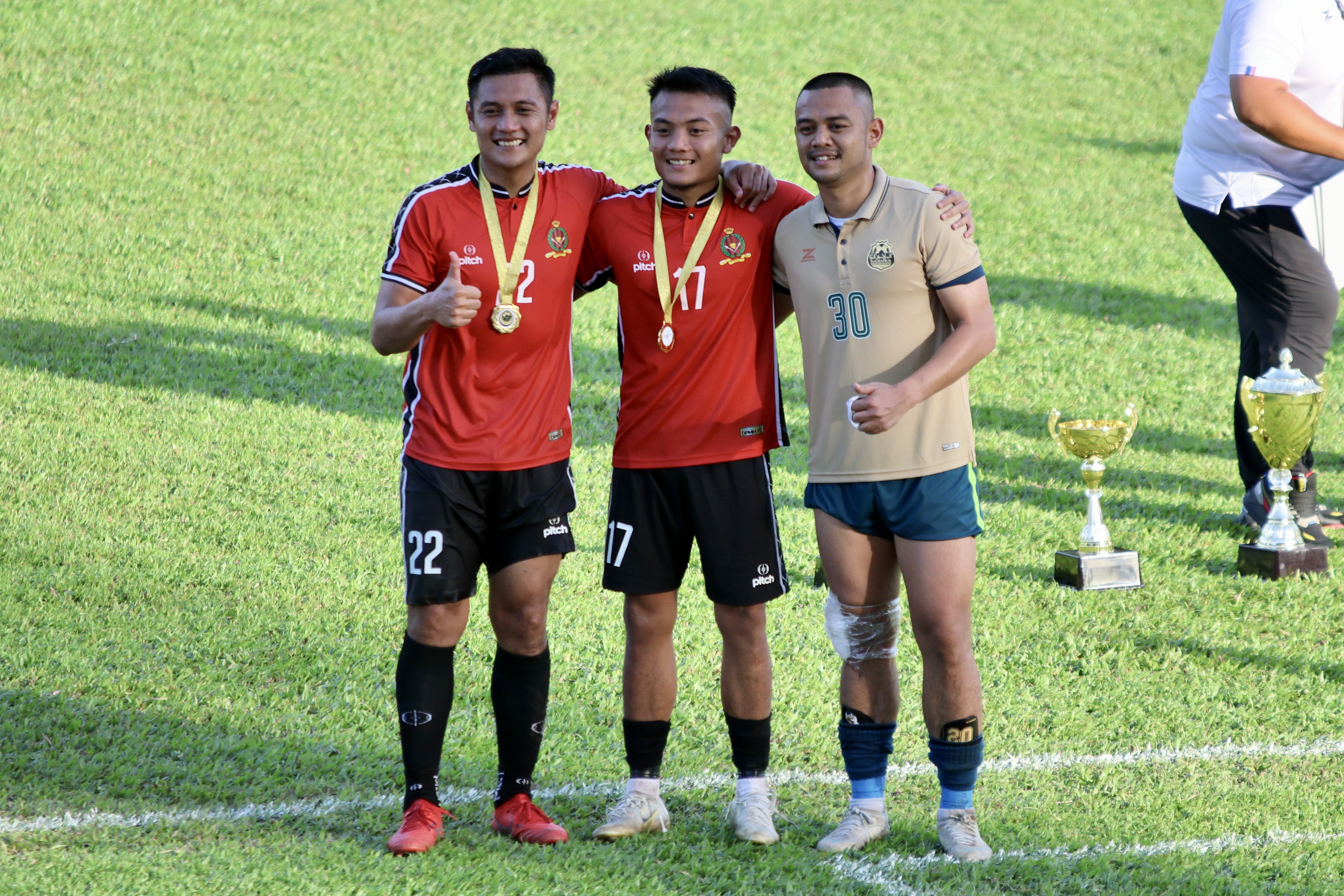
Shah Razen, Hakeme and Adi together after the 2022 FA Cup Final.

Majra

- Brunei League Cup: 2011

DPMM

- S.League: 2015
- Singapore Premier League: 2019
- Singapore League Cup: 2012, 2014

Kota Ranger

- Piala Sumbangsih: 2020

Kasuka

- Brunei Super League (2): 2023, 2024–25

Brunei U-21

- Hassanal Bolkiah Trophy: 2012

Individual

- Meritorious Service Medal (PJK; 2012)
- 2012 Hassanal Bolkiah Trophy Player of the Tournament
- Singapore Premier League Player of the Month: August 2018
- Singapore Premier League top assist provider: 2018 (joint with Riku Moriyasu)
- 2023 Brunei Super League Best Player

== Personal life ==
Adi has three elder brothers who have represented Brunei; Shah Razen is the eldest of all, while Amalul and Ahmad Hafiz are former DPMM players. He has five younger brothers: former Majra FC strike partner Abdul Azim, another ex-Majra player Amirul Sabqi, former Menglait FC player Amiruddin Nizam, former MS ABDB striker Abdul Mateen, and Brunei international Hakeme Yazid of DPMM FC.
