= Hakeme Yazid Said =

Bruneian footballer (born 2003)

Hakeme
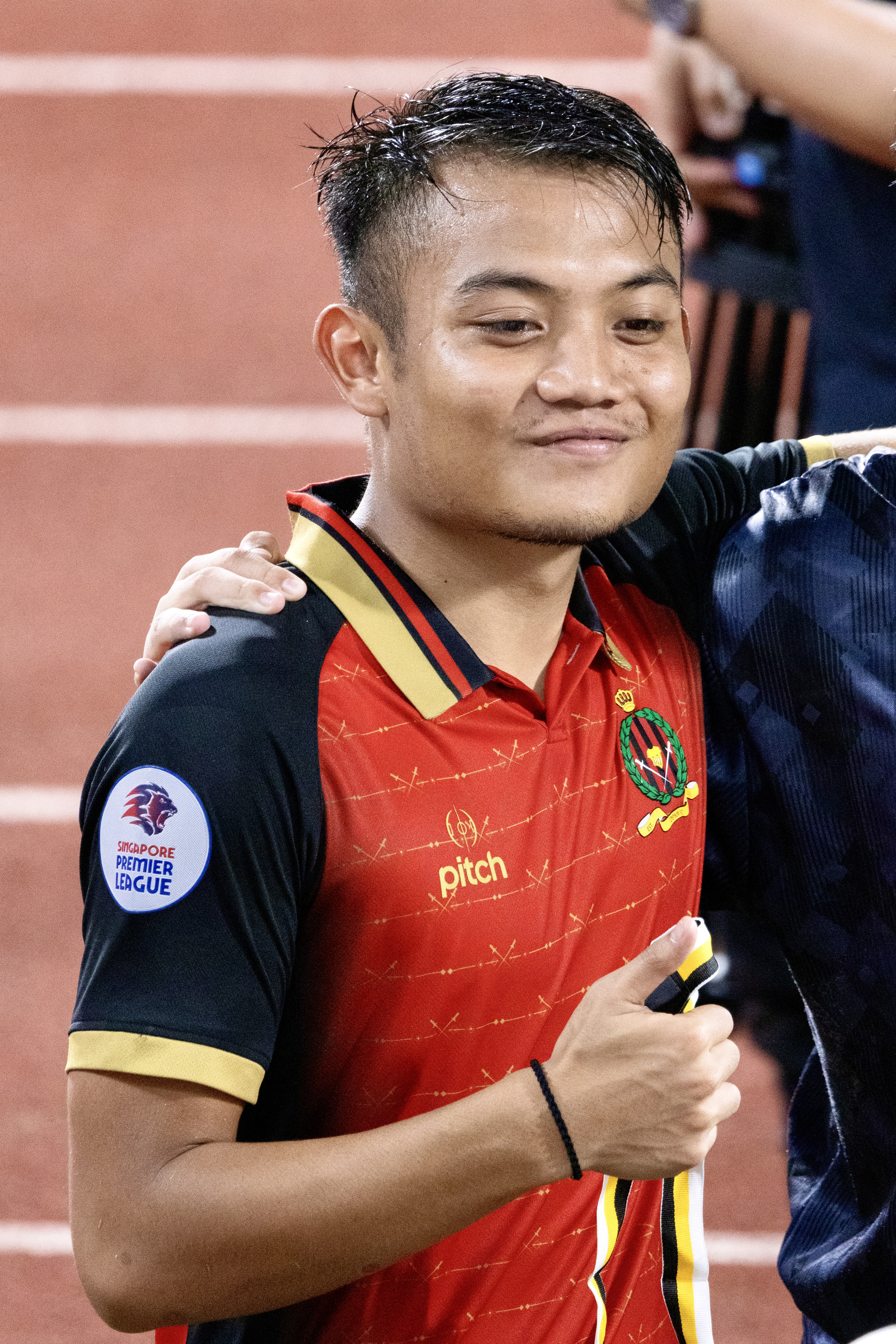
- Hakeme with DPMM in 2024

Personal information
- Full name: Muhammad Hakeme Yazid bin Said
- Date of birth: 8 February 2003 (age 23)
- Place of birth: Bandar Seri Begawan, Brunei
- Height: 1.61 m (5 ft 3 in)
- Position: Forward

Team information
- Current team: DPMM FC
- Number: 17

Youth career
- 2017–2018: Tabuan A
- 2019–2024: DPMM

Senior career*
Years	Team	Apps	(Gls)
2019	DPMM II	7	(9)
2019–	DPMM	73	(29)

International career^{‡}
2017	Brunei U16	9	(1)
2019–2022	Brunei U20	12	(0)
2019–2022	Brunei U23	8	(2)
2020–	Brunei	27	(4)
- * Club domestic league appearances and goals as of 20 November 2026 ‡ National team caps and goals as of 1 October 2026

Muhammad Hakeme Yazid bin Said (born 8 February 2003) is a Bruneian footballer who plays as a forward for DPMM FC of the Malaysia Super League. The youngest brother of Shah Razen Said, he scored on his professional league debut in 2019 at the age of 16.

== Club career ==
=== Youth career ===
Once a student of Rimba II Secondary School, Hakeme followed his brothers' footsteps (eight of them) into football from the age of 13, playing for Tabuan A in youth tournaments around Brunei. His side went on to achieve the double in 2017, becoming youth league champions and cup winners. They were then invited to participate in the 2017–18 Brunei FA Cup where they managed to reach the quarterfinals, faring better than their two senior teams.

=== DPMM ===
At the start of 2019, Hakeme signed a contract to play for DPMM II in the 2018–19 Brunei Premier League, and scored the first goal of the season for his side in a 4–0 victory against Rimba Star on 8 January. In the subsequent matches, he scored two consecutive hat-tricks, with his second against Rainbow FC in the qualifying round of the 2018–19 Brunei FA Cup following their league win against Panchor Murai. Following the win, Hakeme went on to score 8 goals in his next 6 league appearances, being awarded the Golden Boot, as DPMM became league champions.

The head coach of DPMM's first team at the time, Adrian Pennock, kept an eye on Hakeme and promoted him to the first team in the second half of the 2019 Singapore Premier League season. An injury to striker Andrey Varankow enabled Pennock to give the youngster his first-team debut against Geylang International on 2 August, withdrawing Adi to the bench after a poor performance against Home United the week before. At the start of the second half, Hakeme stole the ball deep in the Eagles' back line and broke the deadlock with a debut goal, which at 16 years and 175 days of age was only a day longer than Hariss Harun's youngest goalscorer record for the Singapore leagues. The goal helped DPMM to emerge as 3–0 victors at the Hassanal Bolkiah National Stadium. Following the suspension of the Singapore Premier League in the 2021 season, DPMM competed domestically in their return to the Brunei Premier League with their first team. Hakeme came on as a substitute in the opening match of the season, scoring a goal in a 16–1 demolition of BAKES FC.

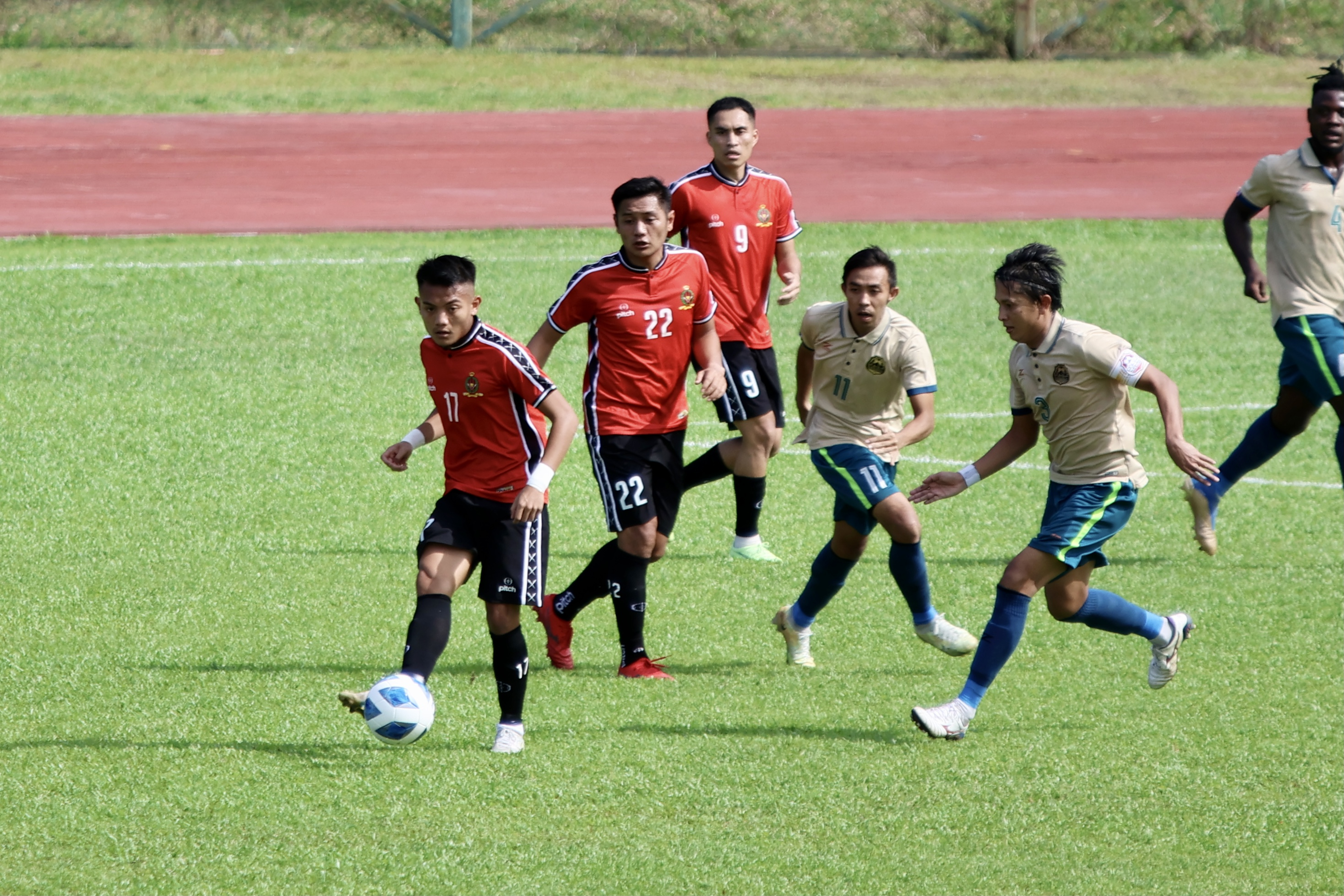
Hakeme with DPMM against Kasuka during the 2022 FA Cup Final

Hakeme played regularly for DPMM at the 2022 Brunei FA Cup, scoring 15 goals that year. He scored five goals against Seri Wira in their opening group game on 13 August which finished 18–0. He then scored four goals in a 15–0 win over Jerudong on 1 October in the first knockout match of the Cup. From there, he scored in every round including the winner in the first leg of the semi-final against Kota Ranger. He played as a starter in the final against Kasuka where his brother Shahrazen netted the winner in the second half to secure a 2–1 win. At the end of the match, Hakeme was awarded the Young Player of the Tournament.

DPMM returned to the Singapore Premier League in the 2023 season, and in their first match in three years which was away against Lion City Sailors Hakeme equalised in the 62nd minute to draw 1–1 before being stretchered off 10 minutes later. The match ended 3–1 to the home team. Scoring regularly throughout the season in the form of individual brilliance, with such goals like a 35-yard direct free kick against Hougang United in a 2–3 loss on 7 June, along with a feint and run from his own half in a 1–3 victory against Lion City Sailors on 11 July earned him the SPL Young Player of the Month for June 2023. He was awarded the same accolade for the month of July, after registering goals in the games against Balestier Khalsa and Geylang International. He finished the league with 12 goals to his name, becoming the team's top goalscorer for the campaign and providing 5 assists.

At the start of 2024, Hakeme helped the DPMM under-20 side become champions of the Brunei Under-20 Youth League, captaining the side in the final against IKLS-MB5 FC U20. In the 2024–25 Singapore Premier League season, Hakeme managed to appear in 22 games for DPMM, registering seven goals, including a brace against high–flying Geylang International on 24 August 2024. On 7 February 2025 against Balestier Khalsa, a Hakeme headed equaliser a minute from added time looked to have stopped a poor run by DPMM who had not gained a single point in the league in 2025 at that point, but Riku Fukashiro managed to win the match for the visitors with the last kick of the game.

After the conclusion of his national service in October 2025, Hakeme made his Malaysia Super League bow on 25 October away against Johor Darul Ta'zim, and lasted an hour on the pitch in a 10–0 defeat. On 7 December, he scored a quick first-half brace in a 4–2 win over Immigration, opening his MSL account. He repeated his feat in the following month, scoring twice against PDRM in a 3–1 home victory. In the 2026 Malaysia Cup fixture against Kelantan RW on 25 January, Hakeme scored directly from a corner kick for DPMM's goal in a 1–1 draw.

== International career ==
=== Youth ===
Hakeme's first international tournament with the Young Wasps was the 2017 AFF U-15 Championship held in Thailand in July 2017. Under Stephen Ng Heng Seng, Brunei U15 managed to finish fourth out of 6 teams, with five points in as many games. Hakeme was ever-present for Brunei at the tournament playing at centre-back. Two months later, the same team set off to Chinese Taipei for the 2018 AFC U-16 Championship qualification Group F matches which were hosted there. Hakeme scored a goal in the first match, a 4–0 victory against Macau on 16 September. Brunei finished third in the group after another win against Hong Kong in their fourth and last match pushed them to 6 points.

A day after scoring in his DPMM FC first-team debut, Hakeme was announced to be joining Brunei U18 for the 2019 AFF U-18 Youth Championship held in Vietnam in August 2019. He played in four matches without finding the back of the net for the Young Wasps.

In November 2019 Hakeme was called up to the national under-23 side competing in the 30th SEA Games held in the Philippines at the end of the month. Three years later he was with the same age group competing in the 2022 AFF U-23 Championship held in Cambodia in February 2022. He managed to score solitary goals against Timor-Leste and the Philippines in the three games contested by the Young Wasps.

Hakeme returned to the national Under-19 side competing at the 2022 AFF U-19 Youth Championship in Indonesia in early July 2022. He played in all five matches but failed to find the net despite being touted as the main attacking threat. In the following September the same team travelled to Bishkek, Kyrgyzstan for the 2023 AFC U-20 Asian Cup qualifying. The Young Wasps lost all three games without scoring a goal even with Hakeme starting every match as captain.

=== Senior ===
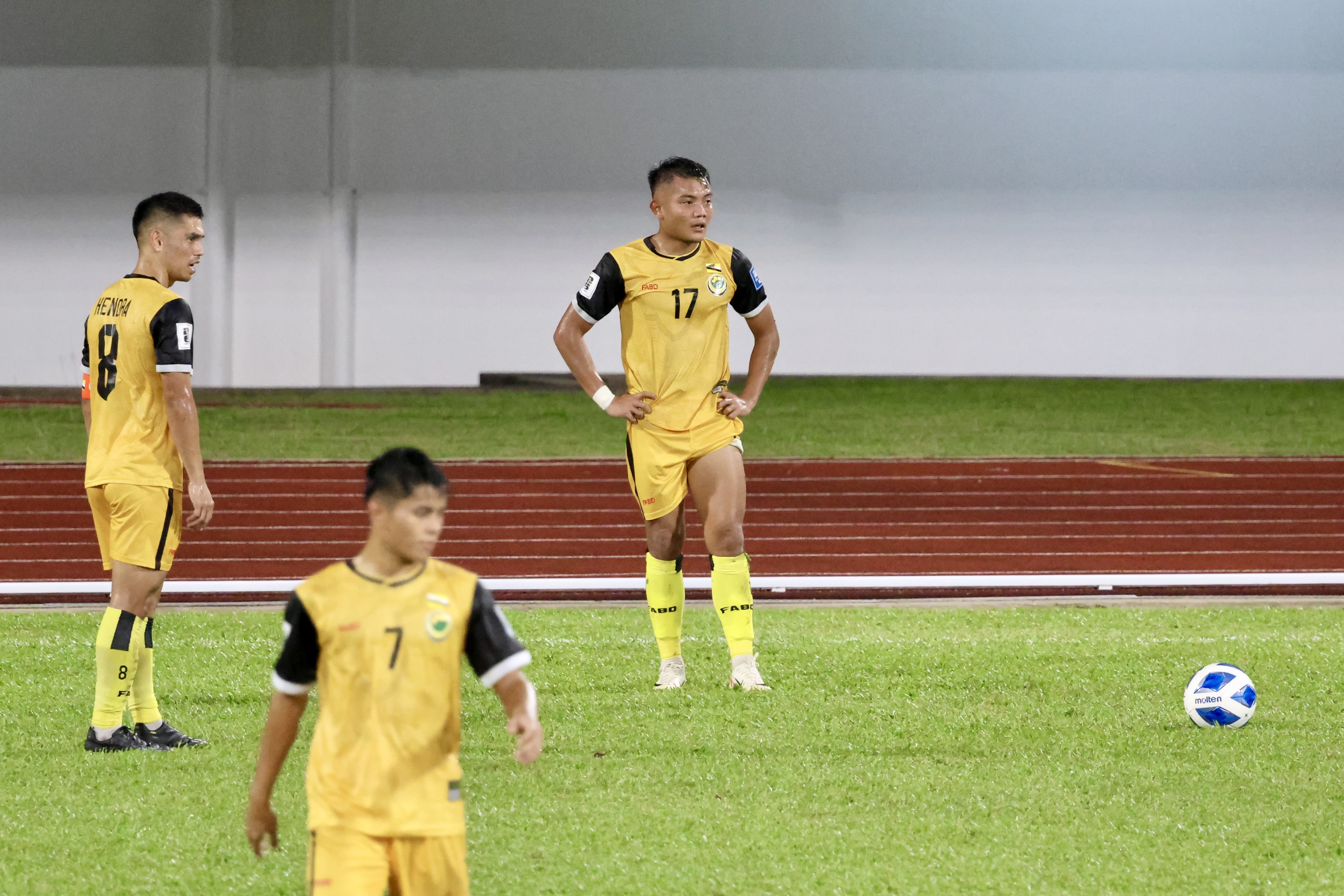
Hendra and Hakeme taking a free kick against Indonesia during the 2026 FIFA World Cup qualification in 2023

In March 2022, Hakeme was announced to be traveling to Laos with the Brunei national team for an international friendly to be played at the end of the month. He debuted for Brunei in a playmaking role, and scored his first international goal with a direct free-kick in the second half but the game ultimately was won by Laos with a 3–2 score. He earned his second cap in another friendly against Malaysia two months later which ended 4–0 to the Malayan Tigers.

In late September 2022, Brunei hosted a tri-nation tournament involving Maldives and Laos and named Hakeme in the squad despite returning from Kyrgyzstan just days before. He came on for the debuting Haziq Kasyful Azim Hasimulabdillah at the hour mark for the match against the Maldives that resulted in a 0–3 lost for the Wasps on 21 September. Six days later, he was played from the start against Laos and this time came out as victors with a 1–0 win courtesy of a Nazirrudin Ismail goal.

In November 2022, Hakeme made the starting lineup in both matches of the two-legged 2022 AFF Mitsubishi Electric Cup qualification against Timor-Leste. Brunei advanced to the 2022 AFF Championship tournament on a 6–3 aggregate win. Hakeme made four appearances for the Wasps in the tournament in which Brunei failed to gain a single point from matches against Thailand, Philippines, Indonesia and Cambodia.

Hakeme was fielded by Mario Rivera for the friendly matches against Sabah FC and Hong Kong in September 2023, as well as the two-legged tie against Indonesia at the 2026 World Cup qualification matches. Suffering heavy defeats against the abovementioned nations, an irate Hakeme launched a short tirade at so-called "insiders" in a post-match interview after the 0–6 home defeat to the Garuda on 17 October.

In March 2024, Hakeme played twice against CONCACAF member Bermuda and OFC member Vanuatu in the 2024 FIFA Series, scoring an injury time direct free kick for the winner against the latter team on 27 March in a 2–3 victory. The following June he made two further appearances from the start against Sri Lanka and contributed to two 1–0 victories for the Wasps.

September 2024 saw Brunei facing Macau in a two-legged play-off to enter the third round of the 2027 AFC Asian Cup qualification. Hakeme started the first leg at Bandar Seri Begawan and scored the first goal in a 3–0 victory. He also played at the return leg in Macau four days later and register a 0–1 away win for the Wasps and advance to the next phase of the Asian Cup qualification.

Hakeme made two appearances for the Wasps at the 2024 ASEAN Championship qualification matches against Timor-Leste in October 2024, this time Brunei were defeated 0–1 on aggregate. The following month, he played from the start in an away friendly against Russia where the Wasps suffered an 11–0 defeat.

After serving a year-long suspension that involved the aftermath of the Russia game, Hakeme returned to the Wasps for the 2027 AFC Asian Cup qualification match against Lebanon in Bandar Seri Begawan on 18 November 2025. The game finished 0–3 in favour of the visitors. In March 2026, Hakeme started the match against Bhutan in the final fixture of the 2027 AFC Asian Cup qualification for Brunei and scored the opening goal in a 2–1 defeat.

In June 2026, Hakeme was included in the Brunei squad up against Timor-Leste for qualification to the 2026 Hyundai Cup. He was only given 45 minutes in the first leg by Ali Mustafa as the Wasps crashed out from the competition in a 1–6 aggregate defeat. Three months later, Hakeme became the focal point of Brunei's attack at the 2026 FIFA ASEAN Cup, starting the game in the forward position against Laos and Hong Kong, both ending in defeat for the Wasps.

== Style of play ==
Hakeme is a forward who predominantly plays on the left wing, using his pace to run past defenders and either creates chances for his teammates or aims for the goal when in favourable circumstances. He is also adept at free kicks, utilising the knuckleball technique to confuse the opposing goalkeeper when shooting directly at the goal.

== Personal life ==
Hakeme Yazid has eight elder brothers who are all footballers. The eldest is Brunei goalgetter Shah Razen, followed by Amalul, Ahmad Hafiz, Adi of Kasuka, Abdul Azim, Amirul Sabqi, Amiruddin Nizam and Abdul Mateen.

In July 2025, Hakeme enrolled into the National Service Programme (PKBN) as part of the 9th Cohorts of the Self Enrichment Programme (PJD). He completed his service in 8 October.

== Career statistics ==
=== Overview ===
As of 20 November 2026

Club	Season	League			Cup		Other		Total	
Club	Season	Division	Apps	Goals	Apps	Goals	Apps	Goals	Apps	Goals
DPMM II	2018–19	Brunei Premier League	7	9	2	3	—		9	12
DPMM	2019	Singapore Premier League	2	1	0	0	—		2	1
DPMM	2020	Singapore Premier League	0	0	0	0	—		0	0
DPMM	2021	Brunei Super League	4	3	—		—		4	3
DPMM	2022	Brunei Super League	—		8	15	—		8	15
DPMM	2023	Singapore Premier League	22	12	7	1	1 (Note: Appearance in AFC Cup qualifying)	0	30	13
DPMM	2024–25	Singapore Premier League	22	7	0	0	—		22	7
DPMM	2025–26	Malaysia Super League	18	6	0	0	4 (Note: Appearance(s) in Malaysia Cup)	2	22	8
DPMM	2026–27	Malaysia Super League	5	0	5	0	0	0	10	0
DPMM	DPMM total		73	29	20	16	5	2	98	47
Career total			80	38	22	19	5	2	107	59

=== International goals ===
No.	Date	Venue	Opponent	Score	Result	Competition
1.	27 March 2022	New Laos National Stadium, Vientiane, Laos	Laos	2–3	2–3	Friendly
2.	26 March 2024	King Abdullah Sports City Reserve Stadium, Jeddah, Saudi Arabia	Vanuatu	3–2	3–2	2024 FIFA Series
3.	6 September 2024	Hassanal Bolkiah National Stadium, Bandar Seri Begawan, Brunei	Macau	1–0	3–0	2027 AFC Asian Cup qualification
4.	31 March 2026	Indira Gandhi Athletic Stadium, Guwahati, India	Bhutan	1–0	1–2	2027 AFC Asian Cup qualification

== Honours ==
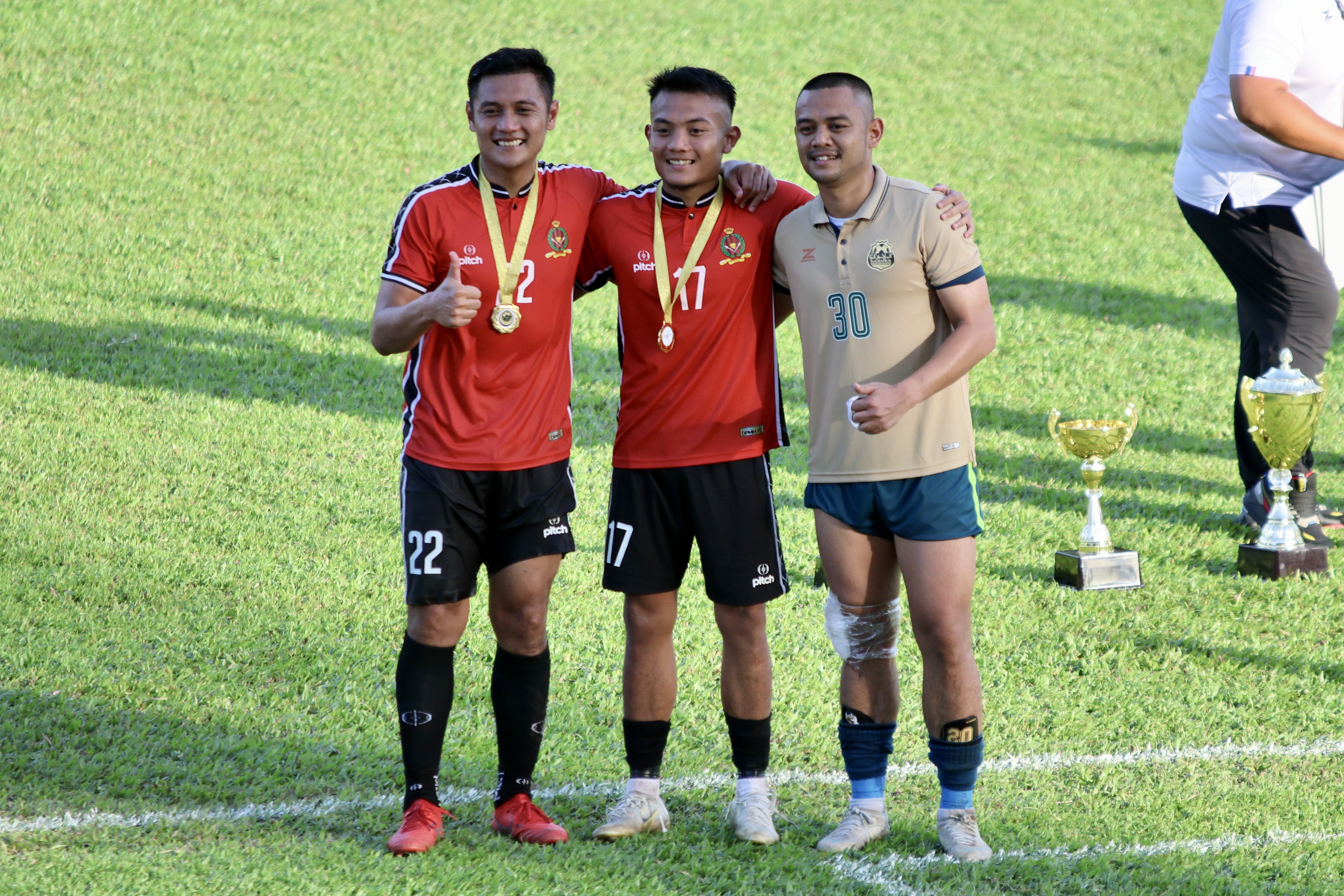
Shah Razen, Hakeme and Adi together after the 2022 FA Cup Final.

Tabuan A

- NFABD U-16 Elite Youth Cup: 2017
- NFABD U-16 National Youth League: 2017

DPMM U20

- FABD Youth Under-20 League: 2024

DPMM

- Brunei Premier League: 2018–19
- Singapore Premier League: 2019
- Brunei FA Cup: 2022

Individual

- Singapore Premier League Team of the Year: 2023
- 2018–19 Brunei Premier League top scorer – 9 goals
- 2022 Brunei FA Cup Young Player of the Tournament
- Singapore Premier League Young Player of the Month: June 2023, July 2023
