= 2024 Brunei national football team indiscipline scandal =

On 17 November 2024, the sensationalist media account MyLordBebo reposted on social media a video secretly recording several Brunei national football team members entering dance pubs and bars in the vicinity of Krasnodar, just two days after a friendly against the Russia national football team where they were beaten 11–0. The video was adapted from the Telegram channel KubMash.

This sparked outrage among the Bruneian public towards the national football team and also the Football Association of Brunei Darussalam, whose immediate response was poorly received by many. As a result, the FABD President was deposed and several players who were involved in the misdemeanor were given punishments such as suspensions from the national team and travel bans, amongst others.

== Background ==
Due to the political actions of Russia, its football team is barred from FIFA and UEFA competitions since 2022 and are forced to play only friendlies with nations who have maintained good relations.

In October 2024, the RFU announced that Brunei would be their opponents in a friendly match to be held in Krasnodar on 15 November. For Brunei, this would be their first ever opponent from UEFA and their trip would be fully paid by Russia.

The majority of the Brunei national team members play their club football for Duli Pengiran Muda Mahkota Football Club, a team competing in the Singapore Premier League, a fully professional league. The Russia friendly match coincided with the league's winter break, and most DPMM players had vacations planned, and thus would not be able to participate. This was somehow relayed to the Russian media at the end of October, that the players that will be sent for the match were told to be "amateurs that would train after finishing their jobs at 4:30pm". This sparked a commotion amongst the Russian media that lowly Brunei were not taking their friendly match seriously. The RFU reminded the visiting team that they expected a formidable selection, not a second-string, to be fielded. FABD had to issue a clarification to what was said to the media previously.

Eventually, the Brunei team that was announced for the Russia friendly boasted several experienced players including a full DPMM backline, club and country captain Azwan Ali Rahman and the 22-year-old mercurial talent Hakeme Yazid Said who is the team's talisman, whose match-winning free-kick against Vanuatu back in April became the start of an incredible five-match winning streak for the Wasps that year. A huge absence however was undisputed goalkeeper Haimie Abdullah Nyaring, whose wedding day coincided with the match.

A 40-strong delegation including the FABD President Feisal Eusoff arrived in Krasnodar days before the match. It was said that he pushed for the friendly game to happen due to his love for travel.

== Match ==
The Bruneian head coach Vinícius Eutrópio, missing four key players for the match, fielded the debuting Kuala Belait FC goalkeeper Jefri Syafiq Ishak, who had limited club and country experience despite being the national third-choice custodian for the Wasps. The first eleven was almost the full-strength Brunei squad with eight players from DPMM FC of the Singapore Premier League.

The gulf in class was apparent from the first minute mark when Russia scored through Ivan Oblyakov. The one-sided friendly match ended 11–0 to Russia, one goal shy of Brunei's record defeat, and the hosts' biggest victory in an international football match. The hosts enjoyed three-quarters of possession, with 41 attempts on goal.

== Incident ==
Two days after the match, several team members were secretly filmed breaking curfew and enjoying the night life of downtown Krasnodar. They had tried to enter a strip club but could not pay the entrance fee using their Bruneian credit cards. They proceeded to enter a cider house and subsequently another bar, drinking alcohol and smoking hookahs.

A certain part of the video had the members confessing their daily profession when asked about their jobs. This confirmed the suspicions of Russian media that the players are not professional footballers.

Kub Mash, a local gossip news account with 20,000 followers on Russian social media website VKontakte, was the first to upload the footage and was credited with the scoop, with their logo watermarked on the video.

== Response ==
There was immediate public outrage in online spaces in Brunei due to the manner of their behaviour that was unethical and in gross violation of the Islamic image of the country. The fact that they partied after a heavy 11–0 loss compounded the rage even further. Almost no one recognised Brunei's five-game winning streak of that year due to lack of coverage, existing skepticism and alarmingly poor results by their youth counterparts, the most devastating being a 19–0 drubbing by Thailand at under-17 level just a month earlier.

The news was shared by prominent social influencer Rano Iskandar and this was where many learned of the controversy.

The Football Association of Brunei Darussalam hastily issued a now-deleted press release a day after the exposé, claiming that the videos were artificially edited. The statement also contained the expression "plot twist" to describe the affair, in which case its usage is inaccurate in this context where the term only applies to fiction where it is intended.

On 19 November, the cider house that the members attended published a photo on their Instagram that candidly showed them and their identities as Bruneian footballers. While the post seemingly acted in good faith and celebrated how sport and gastronomy could unite people from different countries, it disproved the press release the FABD issued the day before that claimed the video was fake.

These turn of events elicited very strong reactions from the Bruneian public, which called for the resignation of all the players, coaching staff and management of the national team, the dissolution of the football association and also a push for criminal investigation.

== Aftermath ==
=== Dismissal of FABD president ===
Feisal Eusoff, already in hot water over accusations of inappropriate conduct during his tenure, was terminated from his position as FABD President via a decree from Sultan Hassanal Bolkiah in a televised announcement on the night of 23 November 2024. Additionally, he was charged under the Sedition Act for challenging the authority of the sultan.

The FABD vice president, Mahrub Murni, immediately took over as president ad interim from that date. However, he stepped down from the position one month later and replaced by Kamarunsalehin Kamis.

=== Disciplinary action on players ===
After a separate and thorough investigation that commenced days after the incident, the Ministry of Culture, Youth and Sports issued a statement on 3 February 2025 outlining the disciplinary actions to be subjected to the members of the national team that were involved. The punishments were outlined as follows:

- Suspension from the Brunei national football team for a maximum period of two years
- Inavailability for selection by their respective clubs to league and cup fixtures played outside of the country
- Mandatory enrolment to the National Service Programme (PKBN)
- Community service

=== Departure of head coach ===
Vinícius Eutrópio, head coach of the national team since 1 November 2024, had initially signed for three months with a view to extending the deal at the end of January. Despite producing a detailed dossier for football development of the country and bringing two backroom staff with him, the change in leadership meant that he was sidelined from extending his short-term deal by his employers who signed Fabio Maciel as technical director the same month. He left Brunei in bitter terms due to a perceived lack of respect as the association became unwilling to execute his instructions that were agreed beforehand. He subsequently won a FIFA-backed lawsuit against FABD.
