= Farid Madsoh =

Thai footballer (born 1987)

Personal information
- Full name: Farid Madsoh
- Date of birth: 6 May 1987 (age 39)
- Place of birth: Thailand
- Height: 1.68 m (5 ft 6 in)
- Position: Midfielder

Senior career*
| Years | Team | Apps | (Gls) |
| 2012 | Phatthalung | | |
| 2013 | Ratchaburi | 11 | (1) |
| 2014–2017 | Osotspa | 29 | (2) |
| 2018 | Thai Honda | | |
| 2019 | Kasetsart | 22 | (0) |
| 2019 | Air Force Central | | |
| 2020–2021 | Uthai Thani | 28 | (0) |
| 2022 | Kasem Bundit University | 27 | (2) |
- * Club domestic league appearances and goals

Farid Madsoh (Thai: ฟาริด หมัดโสะ;) is a Thai footballer who plays for Thai League 3 club Kasem Bundit University as a midfielder.
