= Ahmad Hafiz Said =

Bruneian footballer (born 1989)

Ahmad Hafiz
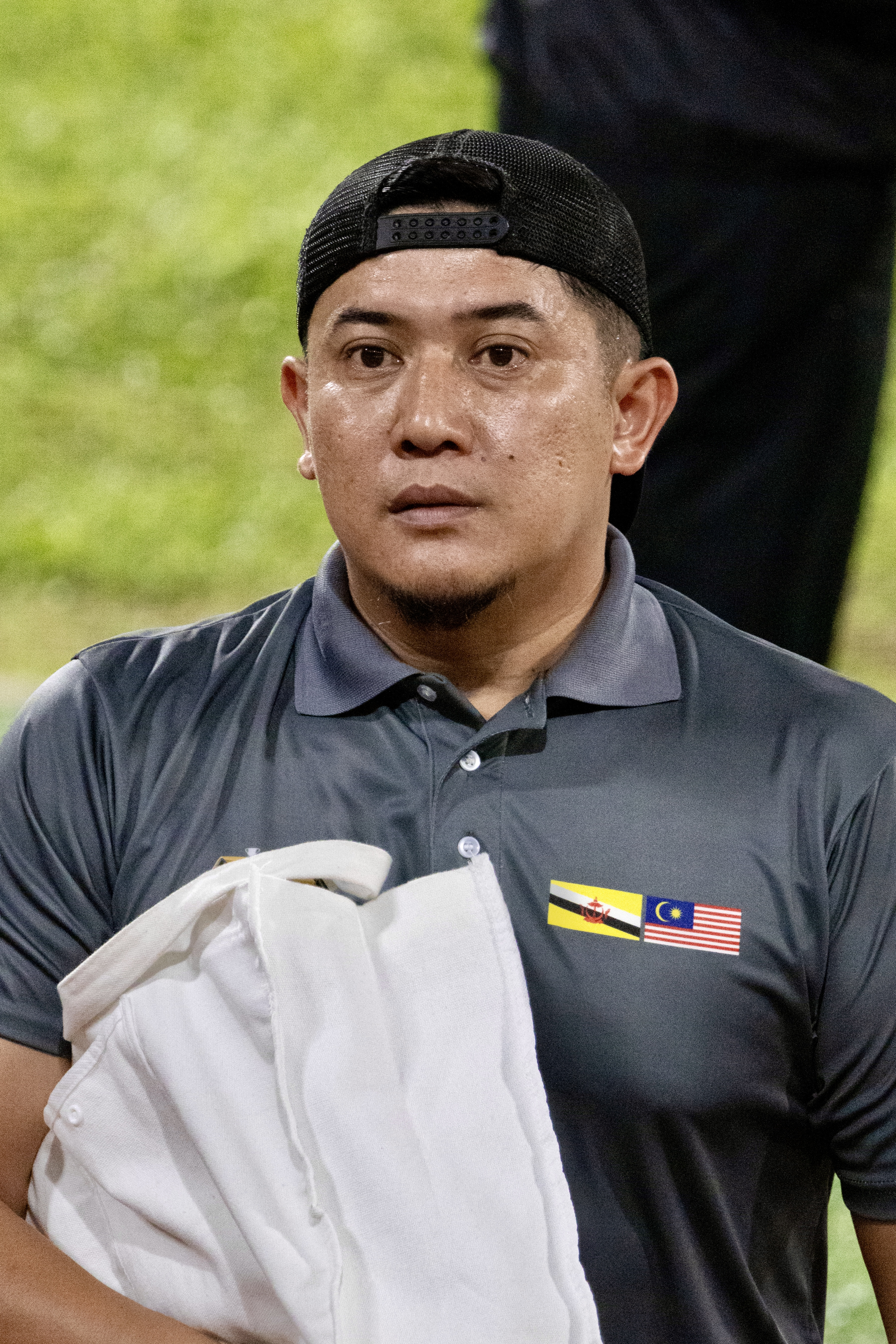
- Ahmad Hafiz in 2024

Personal information
- Full name: Ahmad Hafiz bin Said
- Date of birth: 13 January 1989 (age 37)
- Place of birth: Brunei
- Position: Defender

Youth career
- 2007–2008: DPMM FC

Senior career*
Years	Team	Apps	(Gls)
2009–2014	Majra		
2015–2016	Rimba Star		(1)
2018	Lun Bawang		(0)
2019	Let's Go		(0)
2020	Jerudong	2	(0)
2022	Almerez		
2023	IKLS-MB5	4	(0)
2025–2026	Jerudong	8	(2)

International career^{‡}
2011	Brunei U23	4	(0)
2008	Brunei	2	(0)
- * Club domestic league appearances and goals as of 6 April 2026 ‡ National team caps and goals as of 22 July 2019

Ahmad Hafiz bin Said (born 13 January 1989) is a Bruneian former footballer who played as a defender.

== Club career ==
=== Football ===
In 2007, Ahmad Hafiz trained with the under-21 squad of DPMM FC who were a member of the Malaysia Super League at the time. The previous season, his brother Shahrazen became joint top-scorer in the league. Although the league rules at the time dictate that an under-21 player has to start a league match, head coach Yordan Stoykov preferred to utilise breakout star Azwan Saleh in advanced roles due to form and injuries. Ahmad Hafiz was released after DPMM left the Malaysian leagues for the S.League in 2009.

Ahmad Hafiz moved to Majra FC of the Brunei Premier League, where a few of his other brothers were playing. He spent five years at the club, winning the League Cup in 2011, right until the club withdrew from the league in the middle of the 2014 season.

Ahmad Hafiz transferred to Rimba Star FC along with two of his brothers in 2015. He served as the captain of the team until 2016.

Ahmad Hafiz was signed for Lun Bawang FC for the 2018-19 Brunei Super League season, but left before the second round had started. He featured for Jerudong FC in 2020.

=== Futsal ===
Ahmad Hafiz played for HARs Elite of the Brunei Premier Futsal League in 2024. He became champions of the league on 4 May 2025.

=== Back to football ===
Ahmad Hafiz returned to the football pitch with Jerudong FC for the 2025–26 Brunei Super League season, donning the armband previously worn by Elisa Sabtu. On 1 November 2025, his effort from outside the box became the winning goal in a victory over Wijaya FC.

== International career ==
Ahmad Hafiz was called up by Kwon Oh-son for the 2008 AFC Challenge Cup qualification matches held in the Philippines in May 2008. At 19 years old, he made his international debut as a starter against Bhutan on 15 May in a 1–1 draw. He dropped to the bench in the next game against Tajikistan two days later, but came on in the 74th minute to replace Abu Bakar Mahari. The score was already 3–0 against the Wasps by then.

In November 2011, Ahmad Hafiz was selected to compete at the 2011 Southeast Asian Games held in Indonesia, along with the Under-23s. He appeared in four games out of five, Brunei finishing the group with a win, a draw and three losses.

== Honours ==
Majra FC

- Brunei League Cup: 2011

== Personal life ==
Ahmad Hafiz has eight brothers who are all footballers, two are still actively playing, namely Adi and Hakeme.
