= Mojtaba Esmaeilzadeh =

Iranian professional footballer

Personal information
- Full name: Mojtaba Majid Esmaeilzadeh Mollasaraei
- Date of birth: 8 December 1990 (age 35)
- Place of birth: Rasht, Iran
- Height: 1.81 m (5 ft 11 1/2 in)
- Position: Forward

Senior career*
Years	Team	Apps	(Gls)
2013–2014	Yazd Louleh	20	(2)
2014–2015	Tarbiat Yazd	18	(1)
2015	Giti Pasand	2	(0)
2016	Sepidrood		
2016–2017	Foolad Yazd	28	(3)
2017	Iranjavan		
2018	DPMM FC	15	(4)
2019–2020	Gilanmehr Fouman		
- * Club domestic league appearances and goals as of 13:18, 2 January 2021 (UTC)

Mojtaba Majid Esmaeilzadeh Mollasaraei (born 8 December 1990) is an Iranian professional footballer who plays as a forward for Gilanmehr Fouman.

== Career ==
Esmaeilzadeh began playing with Yazd Louleh during the 2013–14 Azadegan League, making his debut against Pas Hamedan on 11 October 2013; prior to netting his first goal two appearances later versus Rahian Kermanshah. Overall, he scored twice in twenty fixtures. In the following campaign, Yazd Louleh's Azadegan League licence was removed and given to Tarbiat Yazd - Esmaeilzadeh subsequently made the move to Tarbiat Yazd for 2014–15. He departed in 2015 for a short spell with Giti Pasand, which yielded two appearances. Esmaeilzadeh spent the end of the 2015–16 campaign with Sepidrood of League 2.

Sepidrood won promotion in 2015–16, though Esmaeilzadeh left the club soon after to play for the Azadegan League's Foolad Yazd. He was on the books of Foolad Yazd throughout 2016–17, which ended with relegation to League 2. He subsequently had a five-month stint with Iranjavan. In January 2018, Esmaeilzadeh left Iranian football for the first time to play with Brunei-based Singapore Premier League side DPMM FC. He netted two goals in his opening three fixtures with DPMM, scoring goals in wins over Home United and Geylang International. He left in October after four goals in sixteen appearances.

In 2019, Esmaeilzadeh began featuring for Gilanmehr Fouman.

== Career statistics ==
As of 2 January 2021.

Club statistics
Club	Season	League			Cup		League Cup		Continental		Other		Total	
Club	Season	Division	Apps	Goals	Apps	Goals	Apps	Goals	Apps	Goals	Apps	Goals	Apps	Goals
Yazd Louleh	2013–14	Azadegan League	20	2	0	0	—		—		0	0	20	2
Tarbiat Yazd	2014–15	Azadegan League	18	1	0	0	—		—		0	0	18	1
Giti Pasand	2015–16	Azadegan League	2	0	0	0	—		—		0	0	2	0
Foolad Yazd	2016–17	Azadegan League	28	3	0	0	—		—		0	0	28	3
DPMM FC	2018	Premier League	15	4	1	0	—		—		0	0	16	4
Career total			83	10	1	0	—		—		0	0	84	10
