= Karlo Kešinović =

Croatian footballer

Personal information
- Date of birth: 12 December 1989 (age 36)
- Place of birth: Brčko, Bosnia and Herzegovina, Yugoslavia
- Position: Defender

Team information
- Current team: Mladost Buzin

Senior career*
Years	Team	Apps	(Gls)
-2011-12	Hrvatski Dragovoljac	19+	(2+)
2012-2013	Rudeš	24	(3)
2013-2014	SV Neuberg	28	(4)
2014-2015	Hrvatski Dragovoljac	19	(1)
2015-2016	Rudeš	27	(1)
2016-2017	Luxol St. Andrews	31	(2)
2018	Krka	13	(2)
2018	Mons Calpe		
2020-2022	Sloga Koprivnički Ivanec		
2022-	Mladost Buzin		
- * Club domestic league appearances and goals

Karlo Kešinović (born 12 December 1989) is a Croatian footballer, who currently plays for Mladost Buzin.

== Club career ==
In 2013, Kešinović signed for Austrian third division side SV Neuberg after playing for NK Hrvatski Dragovoljac in the Croatian top flight.

In 2016, he signed for Maltese club St. Andrews, before joining NK Krka in the Slovenian second division. After an unsuccessful trial with DPMM, Brunei's most successful team, he played for Gibraltar outfit Mons Calpe SC as well as NK Sloga Koprivnički Ivanec in the Croatian lower leagues.
