= Renê Weber =

Brazilian footballer and manager (1961–2020)

Personal information
- Full name: Renê Carmo Kreuz Weber
- Date of birth: 16 July 1961
- Place of birth: Roque Gonzales (RS–Brazil)
- Date of death: 16 December 2020 (aged 59)
- Place of death: Rio de Janeiro, Brazil
- Height: 1.79 m (5 ft 10 in)
- Position: Midfielder

Senior career*
Years	Team	Apps	(Gls)
1983	Internacional		
1984–1987	Fluminense		
1987–1991	Vitória de Guimarães		
1992	Fluminense		
1993	America		

International career
1986	Brazil U23		

Managerial career
- 2002: America
- 2003: Sporting Cristal
- 2004–2005: Brasil U20
- 2005–2006: Al Shabab
- 2006–2007: Sharjah
- 2007: Criciúma
- 2007–2008: Vila Nova
- 2008–2009: Caxias
- 2009: Grêmio (assistant)
- 2010: Figueirense
- 2010: Anapolina
- 2010–2011: Al-Shaab
- 2013: Vasco da Gama (assistant)
- 2013: São Paulo (assistant)
- 2014: Atlético Mineiro (assistant)
- 2015: Nova Iguaçu
- 2018–2019: DPMM FC
- * Club domestic league appearances and goals

Renê Carmo Kreuz Weber (16 July 1961 – 16 December 2020) was a Brazilian football manager and player.

== Biography ==
Between 2004 and 2005, Weber managed the Brazilian national under-20 team, which finished in third place at the 2005 FIFA World Youth Championship.

Weber died from complications brought on by COVID-19 in Rio de Janeiro on 16 December 2020, at the age of 59 during the COVID-19 pandemic in Brazil.
