= Pengiran Anak Abdul Rahim =

Bruneian nobility (born 1969)

Abdul Rahim عبدالرحيم
- Pengiran Maharaja Setia Laila Diraja Shahibul Irshad
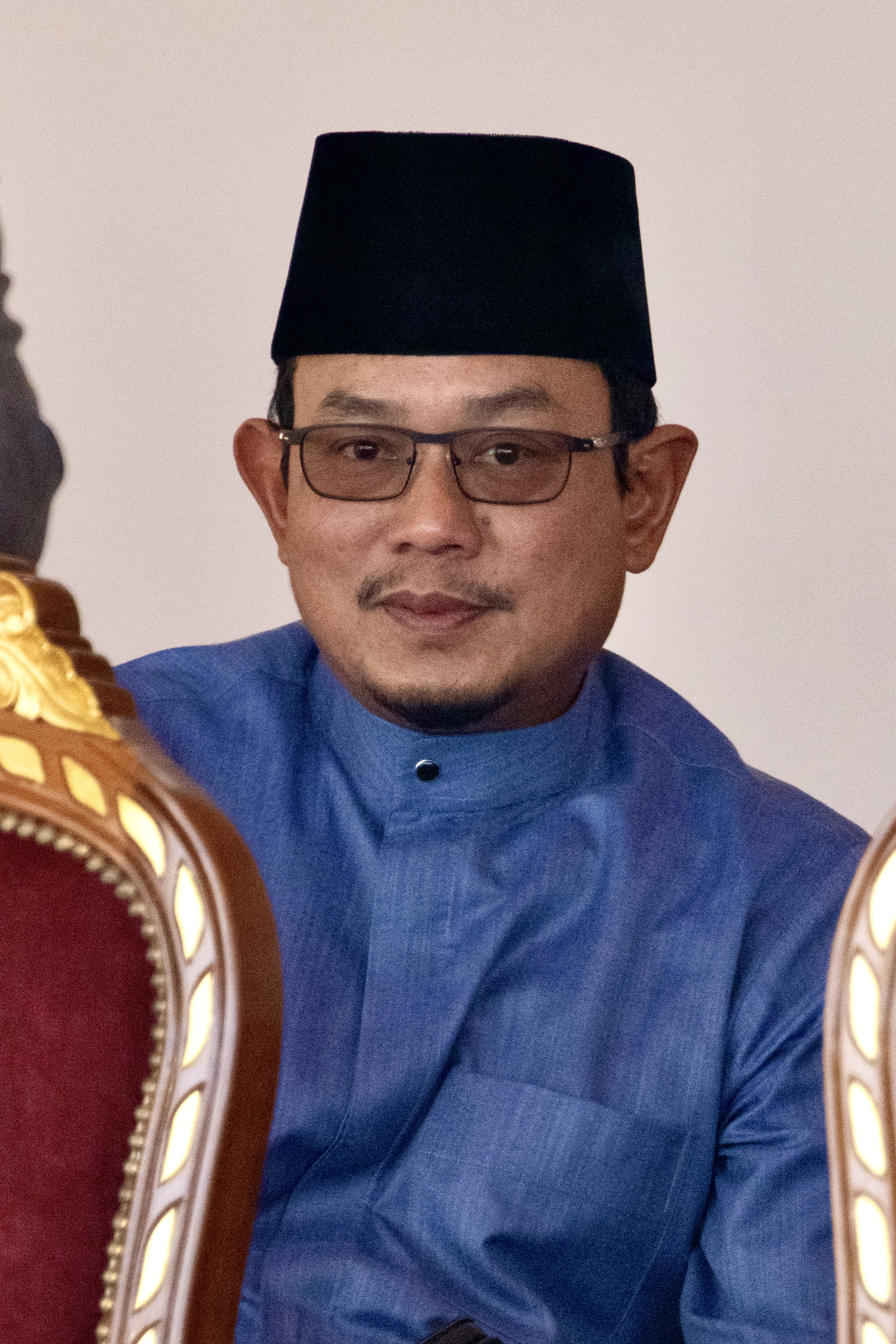
- Abdul Rahim in 2024
- Born: Abdul Rahim ibn Kemaluddin; 1 January 1970 (age 56); Bandar Seri Begawan, Brunei
- Spouse: Princess Rashidah (m. 1996)
- Issue: Raheemah Sanaul; Hariisah Widadul; Abdul Raqiib; Abdul Haseeb; Raqeeqah Raayatul
- House: Bolkiah
- Father: Kemaluddin ibn Muhammad Yasin
- Mother: Siti Rafiah binti Hashim

Abdul Rahim ibn Kemaluddin (born 1 January 1970) is a member of the royal family of Brunei as the husband of Princess Rashidah, eldest daughter of Sultan Hassanal Bolkiah of Brunei.

== Early life ==
Abdul Rahim was born on 1 January 1970 in Bandar Seri Begawan to Pengiran Anak Kemaluddin ibn Pengiran Anak Muhammad Yasin and Pengiran Anak Siti Rafiah binti Pengiran Muda Hashim. He is the grandson of Pengiran Muda Hashim ibn Pengiran Anak Abdul Raham.

== Education and career ==
Abdul Rahim received his education at Muhammad Jamalul Alam Secondary School and Sultan Omar Ali Saifuddien College. He then went to London where he earned his Higher National Diploma in business studies.

He returned to Brunei to help look after his family's business interests. He is also the vice chairman of DPMM FC, the football club owned by his brother-in-law, Crown Prince Al-Muhtadee Billah.

== Marriage and issue ==
In August 1996, Abdul Rahim married his second cousin, Princess Rashidah, in an elaborate two week celebration from the 9th to the 24th.

The first event involving the couple was the Majlis Istiadat Berbedak Pengantin Diraja, or powdering ceremony, on the 14th. The next day was the Majlis Istiadat Akad Nikah Diraja or solemnisation ceremony at Omar Ali Saifuddien Mosque where they were officially married. On the 17th was the Majlis Istiadat Berinai Diraja, or henna ceremony, where the couple wore matching red traditional outfits. The highpoint of the celebrations was the Majlis Bersanding Pengantin Diraja on the 18th which was followed by a procession through the streets of Bandar Seri Begawan. That evening was the Majlis Persantapan Diraja which was a banquet at Istana Nurul Iman with around 5,000 guests. Another reception, the Majlis Istiadat Ambil-Ambilan was held on the 19th.

On August 24, Whitney Houston performed a private concert at Jerudong Park Amphitheatre as the grand finale of the wedding celebrations.

=== Issue ===
The couple have 2 sons and 3 daughters. All of their children have the style of Yang Amat Mulia and the title of Pengiran Anak.

- Raheemah Sanaul Bolkiah (born 28 December 1997)
- Hariisah Widadul Bolkiah (born 25 October 1999)
- Abdul Raqiib (born 14 May 2002)
- Abdul Haseeb (born 14 January 2006)
- Raqeeqah Raayatul Bolkiah (born 16 December 2009)

== Royal duties ==
Abdul Rahim is a member of the Privy Council and the Jabatan Adat Istiadat Negara, or Department of State Customs.

Upon taking cheteria membership, he began carrying out royal duties during ceremonial events. In May 2007, he oversaw the Majlis Doa Selamat serta Kesyukuran Istiadat Bersira ceremony after the birth of Prince Muntaqim at the surau of Istana Nurul Iman. In January 2023, he assisted in the wedding ceremonies of Princess Azemah and Prince Bahar.

== Titles, styles, and honours ==
Personal standard of Pengiran Maharaja Setia Laila Diraja Shahibul Irshad

=== Titles and styles ===
On 29 April 2004, Abdul Rahim was bestowed the Cheteria title of Pengiran Maharaja Setia Laila Diraja Shahibul Irshad.

- 1 January 1970 – 29 April 2004: Yang Amat Mulia Pengiran Anak Abdul Rahim bin Pengiran Indera Mahkota Pengiran Anak Kemaludin
- 29 April 2004 – present: Yang Amat Mulia Pengiran Maharaja Setia Laila Diraja Sahibul Irshad Pengiran Anak Abdul Rahim bin Pengiran Indera Mahkota Pengiran Anak Kemaludin

=== Honours ===
- Family Order of Laila Utama (DK) – Dato Laila Utama
- Sultan of Brunei Golden Jubilee Medal (5 October 2017)
- Proclamation of Independence Medal (1 January 1984)
- Sultan of Brunei Silver Jubilee Medal (5 October 1992)
- National Day Silver Jubilee Medal (23 February 2009)
