= List of lighthouses in Brunei =

This is a list of lighthouses in Brunei.

== Lighthouses ==
Name	Image	Year built	Location & coordinates	Class of light	Focal height	NGA number	Admiralty number	Range nml
Ampa Patches Lighthouse	Image	n/a	South China Sea; 4°57′06.0″N 114°22′18.0″E (NGA)	Fl (4) W 20s.	17 metres (56 ft)	24248	F1934.8	12
Lumut Lighthouse	Image	2005	Lumut; 4°38′58.5″N 114°24′30.6″E	n/a	30 metres (98 ft)	n/a	n/a	n/a
Muara Entrance Range Front Lighthouse		n/a	Muara; 5°01′16.6″N 115°05′04.4″E	F G	15 metres (49 ft)	24328	F1936.5	10
Muara Entrance Range Rear Lighthouse		n/a	Muara; 5°00′48.3″N 115°04′48.0″E	F G	28 metres (92 ft)	24332	F1936.51	12
Pulau Chermin Lighthouse		n/a	Pulau Chermin; 4°56′01.0″N 115°01′26.8″E	Fl (2) W 10s.	16 metres (52 ft)	24166	F1941.1	12
Pelong Rocks Lighthouse	Image	n/a	Brunei Bay; 5°04′43.6″N 115°03′11.2″E	Fl (3) W 15s.	24 metres (79 ft)	24368	F1936	13
Tanjiung Sapo Lighthouse		n/a	Muara; 4°59′40.9″N 115°07′34.9″E	Fl WR 10s.	28 metres (92 ft)	24316	F1938	10

== See also ==
- Lists of lighthouses and lightvessels
