= Pengiran Anak Puteri Hajah Rashidah Sa'adatul Bolkiah Secondary School =

School in Lumut, Brunei

- Sekolah Menengah Pengiran Anak Puteri Hajah Rashidah Sa'adatul Bolkiah

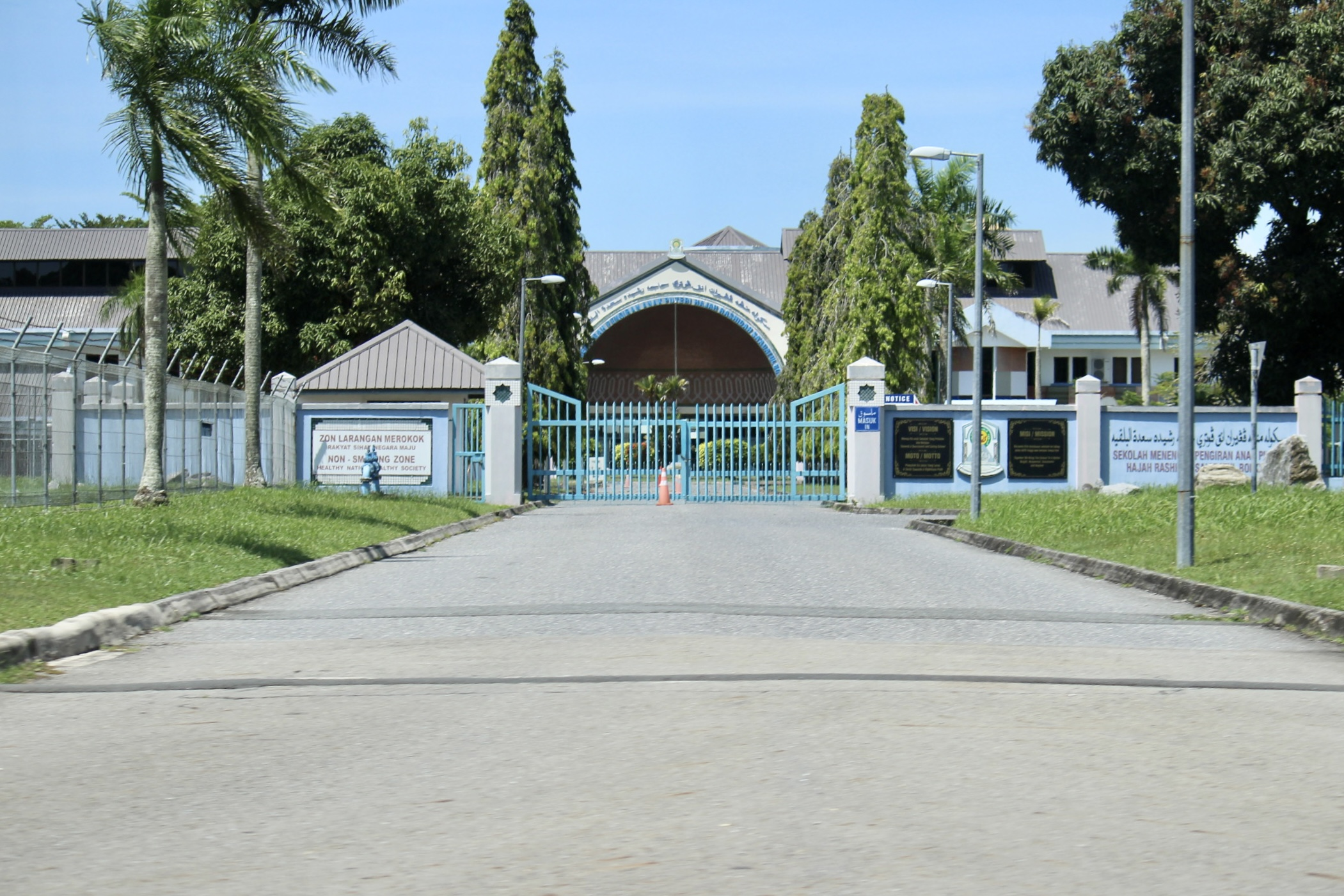

Location
- Jalan Malawaring; Kampong Sungai Tali, Lumut, Seria, Belait, KC3135; Brunei
- Coordinates: 4°39′10.3″N 114°26′13.7″E

Information
- Type: Public secondary school
- Established: 9 May 1994; 31 years ago
- School district: Cluster 6
- Authority: Ministry of Education
- Principal: Kamal Bahrin Jamal
- Years offered: 7–13
- Gender: Coeducational
- Affiliations: CIE, IGCSE
- Website: Instagram

Pengiran Anak Puteri Hajah Rashidah Sa'adatul Bolkiah Secondary School (Malay: Sekolah Menengah Pengiran Anak Puteri Hajah Rashidah Sa'adatul Bolkiah, Abbrev: SMPAPHRSB) is a government secondary school located in Lumut, a settlement area in Belait District, Brunei. Kamal Bahrin Jamal is the current acting principal of the school.

== Etymology ==
The school is named after Princess Rashidah Sa'adatul Bolkiah, the eldest daughter of Sultan Hassanal Bolkiah, the 29th and current Sultan of Brunei.

== History ==
The school's B$21 million construction took place on 16.2 hectares (40 acres) in Kampong Sungai Tali, Lumut, and was completed in 14 months. From Seria, it is around 9.6 kilometres (6.0 mi). It was constructed as part of the 5th National Development Plan (RKN 5) in order to accommodate Anthony Abell College's growing student body. Additionally, It was constructed for the convenience of students residing in the RPN Lumut and the surrounding area of Mukim Liang–Lumut.

On 9 May 1994, the school began with 25 professors and 381 pupils. It was formerly called Sungai Tali Secondary School. The official name of the school was changed to Pengiran Anak Puteri Hajah Rashidah Sa'adatul Bolkiah Secondary School on 6 October. The event was officiated by Princess Rashidah Sa'adatul Bolkiah herself. French language and agricultural science were added to Lower Secondary pupils in 1996. The school song was released in 1998 by the school song committee, written by Awang Juin Antin. In order to meet the requirements of slow learners and pupils with special needs resulting from developmental delays, multiple handicaps, hearing impairments, premature aging, slow learners, and support needs, special education was added to the school curriculum in 1999.

The school implemented the "Ugama RINTIS" curriculum at the start of January 2002, allowing Islamic studies, which are already taught at religious schools throughout the nation, to be taught there. Primary Four through Primary Six children had this done in the afternoon. The school's curriculum also saw the addition of French language in 1997 and design technology in 2005. The French ambassador to Brunei officially launched the nation's first school history museum in 2000 when the school established it. There are currently more IGCSE subjects available, such as those for design technology, physical education, and computer science.

The school celebrated its silver jubilee held around the school on 30 April 2019.

== School life ==
On the CCA Awards Day, the school recognised its pupils for their outstanding accomplishments in co-curricular activities (CCA). During the occasion, certificates and medals were given to pupils who had placed first in events as well as to those who had represented the school abroad.

== See also ==
- List of secondary schools in Brunei
