= Lumut Lighthouse =

Lighthouse at Sungai Kayu Ara, Mukim Liang, Belait District, Brunei

Lumut Lighthouse Rumah Api Lumut
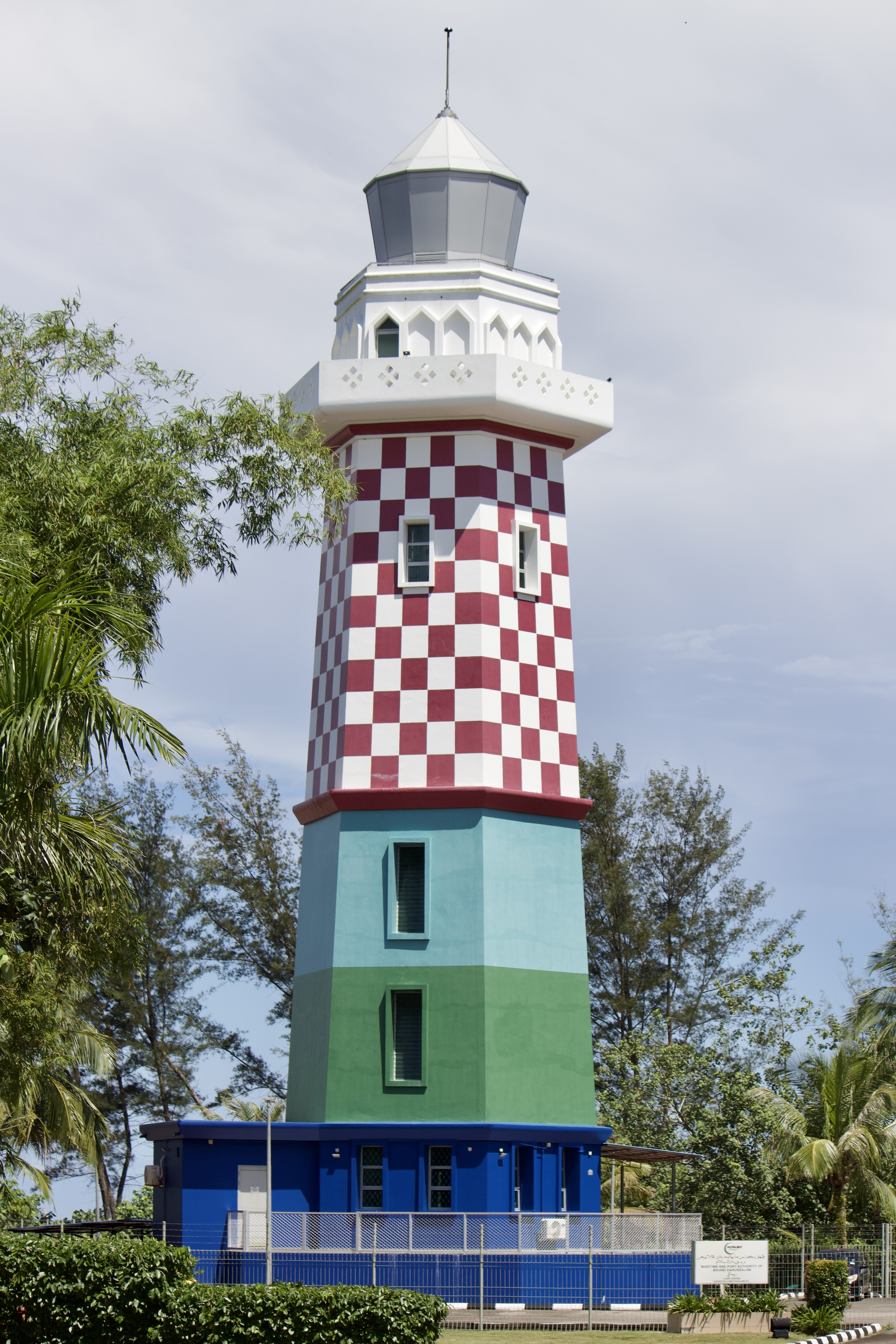
- The lighthouse in 2022
- Location: Brunei Sungai Kayu Ara, Liang, Belait
- Coordinates: 4.6495091°N 114.4085950°E

Tower
- Constructed: 2005
- Foundation: 1-story keeper's house
- Construction: concrete tower
- Height: 105 ft (32 m)
- Shape: hexagonal tower with balcony and lantern
- Markings: red, white and blue
- Operator: Maritime Port Authority Brunei Darussalam

Light
- First lit: March 2005
- Focal height: 108 ft (33 m)
- Range: 45 km (24 nmi)
- Characteristic: Fl (3) W 15s.

The Lumut Lighthouse (Malay: Rumah Api Lumut) is an active navigational aid located in Kampong Lumut II, Belait District, Brunei. Constructed in 2004 and operational since 2005, the 32-metre-tall structure is painted red, white, and blue and fitted with LED illumination. Serving as an auxiliary aid to vessels approaching Lumut on the South China Sea, it is maintained by the Ports and Marine Department.

== Design ==
The structure is a 32-metre (105 ft) tall lighthouse painted in red, white, and blue. It is equipped with light-emitting diode (LED) illumination and has a focal plane approximately 33 metres above sea level. The light displays three white flashes every 15 seconds from a 30-metre hexagonal tower with a lantern and gallery. With a nominal range of 45 kilometres (28 mi), the lighthouse serves as an auxiliary aid to navigation for vessels approaching Lumut, situated on the South China Sea to the west of the entrance to Brunei Bay. The Admiralty lists the lighthouse among lights associated with oil and gas production platforms, although no reason is provided for this classification.

== History ==
The Lumut Lighthouse, maintained by the Ports and Marine Department, was constructed on 4 November 2004 at a cost of B$937,212.08 and commenced operation in March 2005. It is situated in Kampong Lumut II, Belait District, approximately 15.2 kilometres from Seria. The lighthouse received national attention following a visit by Sultan Hassanal Bolkiah on 23 May 2006. In November 2021, in observance of International Maritime Organization Day, the lighthouse was among five structures illuminated.

== See also ==
- List of lighthouses in Brunei
- List of tallest lighthouses
