= Whitney: Brunei The Royal Wedding Celebration =

1996 concert by Whitney Houston in Brunei

Whitney Houston Live In Brunei: The Royal Wedding Celebration
- Private concert by Whitney Houston
- Location: Bandar Seri Begawan, Brunei
- Venue: Jerudong Park Amphitheater
- Date: August 24, 1996
- Guests: Hassanal Bolkiah and Princess Rashidah
- Box office: $7 million

Whitney Houston concert chronology
- The Bodyguard World Tour; Whitney: Brunei The Royal Wedding Celebration; Pacific Rim Tour

Whitney – Brunei: The Royal Wedding Celebration was a notable concert performance by American singer Whitney Houston in August 1996. Houston performed a private concert, for the wedding of Princess Rashidah, the eldest daughter of the Sultan of Brunei, Hassanal Bolkiah, at the Jerudong Park Amphitheater on August 24, 1996.

== History ==
The set list was similar to her Bodyguard World Tour in 1993-1994, "Exhale (Shoop Shoop)" was added to the encore. Houston also performed her pop hit song, "Greatest Love of All". The show included five female background dancers, performing with the singer as she sang her uptempo hits. During the introductions of her band members, Houston sang the chorus part of her and Bobby Brown's duet song, "Something in Common". The chorus of the song was re-arranged to "I Wish You Were Here".

She was reportedly paid $7 million to perform for this event. Media stories on the Brunei royal family indicated that Prince Jefri gave Houston a blank check for the event and instructed her to fill it out for what she felt she was worth.

== Set list ==
1. "Instrumental"
2. "So Emotional
3. "Saving All My Love for You"
4. "I Wanna Dance with Somebody (Who Loves Me)"
5. "How Will I Know"
6. Medley: "All at Once" / "Nobody Loves Me Like You Do" / "Didn’t We Almost Have It All" / "Where Do Broken Hearts Go"
7. "All the Man That I Need"
8. "My Name Is Not Susan"
9. "Queen of the Night"
10. "I Have Nothing"
11. "Something in Common" (Interlude)
12. "I Will Always Love You"
13. "I'm Every Woman"
14. "Greatest Love of All"
15. "Exhale (Shoop Shoop)"
16. "Exhale (Reprise)"

== Personnel ==
- Musical Director: Rickey Minor
- Bass guitar/Bass synthesizer: Rickey Minor
- Guitars: Paul Jackson, Jr.
- Keyboards: Wayne Linsey, Bette Sussman
- Drums: Michael Baker
- Percussions: Bashiri Johnson
- Saxophones/EWI: Gerald Albright
- Trumpet: Michael "Patches" Stewart, Oscar Brashear
- Background Vocalists: Olivia McClurkin, Pattie Howard, Della Miles
- Little girls dancers: Mercedez Demus, Fajaliah Harper, Vanity Ramdhan, Mistey Ramdhan, Sylvia Enriquez

== Security ==
- Alan Jacobs: Director of Security
