= Princess Rashidah Sa'adatul Bolkiah =

Bruneian princess (born 1969)

Rashidah Sa'adatul Bolkiah
- Rashidah in 2024
- Born: Rashidah Sa'adatul Bolkiah binti Hassanal Bolkiah Mu'izzaddin Waddaulah; 26 July 1969 (age 57); Istana Darul Hana, Tumasek, Bandar Seri Begawan, Brunei
- Spouse: Abdul Rahim ibn Kemaludin (m. 1996)
- Issue: Raheemah Sanaul; Hariisah Widadul; Abdul Raqiib; Abdul Haseeb; Raqeeqah Raayatul
- House: Bolkiah
- Father: Hassanal Bolkiah
- Mother: Saleha binti Mohamed Alam
- Religion: Sunni Islam

Rashidah Sa'adatul Bolkiah binti Hassanal Bolkiah (Jawi: رشيدة سعادة البلقية; born 26 July 1969) is a member of the royal family of Brunei. She is the oldest child of Sultan Hassanal Bolkiah of Brunei and Queen Saleha.

== Early life ==
Princess Rashidah was born on 26 July 1969 to Sultan Hassanal Bolkiah of Brunei and his first wife, Queen Saleha of Brunei. She has five full siblings and six half-siblings from her father's other marriages.

== Education and career ==
Princess Rashidah started her education at the private school set up for royal children at Istana Darul Hana. She then attended St. Andrew's School and Paduka Seri Begawan Sultan Science College.

In 1992, Rashidah graduated from Universiti Brunei Darussalam with a Bachelor of Arts degree in Public Policy and Administration. She then became the first member of the royal family to receive a Master's degree when she graduated from Universiti Brunei Darussalam with a degree in Public Policy and Administration in 1994.

She worked in the Public Service Department of the Prime Minister's Office in 1994 and the Ministry of Development in 1995.

== Marriage and issue ==
In August 1996, Princess Rashidah married her second cousin, Pengiran Anak Abdul Rahim ibn Pengiran Anak Kemaluddin in an elaborate two week celebration from the 9th to the 24th.

The first event involving the couple was the Majlis Istiadat Berbedak Pengantin Diraja, or powdering ceremony, on the 14th. Rashidah wore a red songket dress with diamond jewelry. The next day was the Majlis Istiadat Akad Nikah Diraja or solemnisation ceremony at Omar Ali Saifuddien Mosque where they were officially married. On the 17th was the Majlis Istiadat Berinai Diraja, or henna ceremony, where the couple wore matching red traditional outfits. The highpoint of the celebrations was the Majlis Bersanding Pengantin Diraja on the 18th which was followed by a procession through the streets of Bandar Seri Begawan. The couple wore matching green outfits and Rashidah wore her mother's emerald and diamond jewelry. That evening she wore a yellow dress and another of her mother's diamond tiaras to the Majlis Persantapan Diraja which was a banquet at Istana Nurul Iman with around 5,000 guests. Another reception, the Majlis Istiadat Ambil-Ambilan was held on the 19th and Princess Rashidah again wore a red outfit this time with her mother's multi-colored diamond tiara.

On August 24, Whitney Houston performed a private concert at Jerudong Park Amphitheatre as the grand finale of the wedding celebrations.

Princess Rashidah and Pengiran Anak Abdul Rahim have 2 sons and 3 daughters. All of their children have the style of Yang Amat Mulia and the title of Pengiran Anak.

- Raheemah Sanaul Bolkiah (born 28 December 1997)
- Hariisah Widadul Bolkiah (born 25 October 1999)
- Abdul Raqiib (born 14 May 2002)
- Abdul Haseeb (born 14 January 2006)
- Raqeeqah Raayatul Bolkiah (born 16 December 2009)

== Royal duties ==
She is the former President of Girl Guides Association of Brunei Darussalam. The presidency has since been taken over by her sister, Princess Hafizah, but Rashidah is still involved in the organization.

== Titles, styles, and honours ==
Styles of Princess Rashidah
- Reference style: Yang Teramat Mulia
- Alternative style: Her Royal Highness

=== Title and style ===
Her full title and style is (The title, Yang Teramat Mulia Paduka Seri Pengiran Anak Puteri was taken back by the Sultan. )Pengiran Hajah Rashidah Sa'adatul Bolkiah binti Kebawah Duli Yang Maha Mulia Paduka Seri Baginda Sultan Haji Hassanal Bolkiah Mu'izzaddin Wad'daulah It is usually translated in English as Princess Rashidah of Brunei.

=== Honours ===
==== National ====
- Order of the Crown of Brunei (DKMB; 15 August 1982)
- Sultan Hassanal Bolkiah Medal First Class (PHBS)
- Proclamation of Independence Medal (1 January 1984)
- Sultan of Brunei Silver Jubilee Medal (5 October 1992)
- Sultan of Brunei Golden Jubilee Medal (5 October 2017)
- National Day Silver Jubilee Medal (23 February 2009)

==== Foreign ====
- Jordan:
  - Grand Cordon Supreme Order of the Renaissance (13 May 2008)

=== Namesakes ===
- Pengiran Anak Puteri Hajah Rashidah Sa'adatul Bolkiah Secondary School, a government secondary school in Lumut.
- Pengiran Anak Puteri Rashidah Sa'adatul Bolkiah Religious School, a religious school in Seria.
- Pengiran Anak Puteri Rashidah Sa'adatul Bolkiah Institute of Health Sciences, a health institute in Universiti Brunei Darussalam.
- Pengiran Anak Puteri Rashidah Sa'adatul Bolkiah Health Centre, a health centre in Sungai Asam, Lumapas.
- Rashidah Sa'adatul Bolkiah Mosque, a mosque in Sungai Akar, Bandar Seri Begawan.
- Princess Rashidah Young Nature Scientist Award (PRYNSA), a prestigious and high profile awareness programme.
