= Lumut, Brunei =

Settlement in Brunei

Kampong Lumut Kampung Lumut
- Village
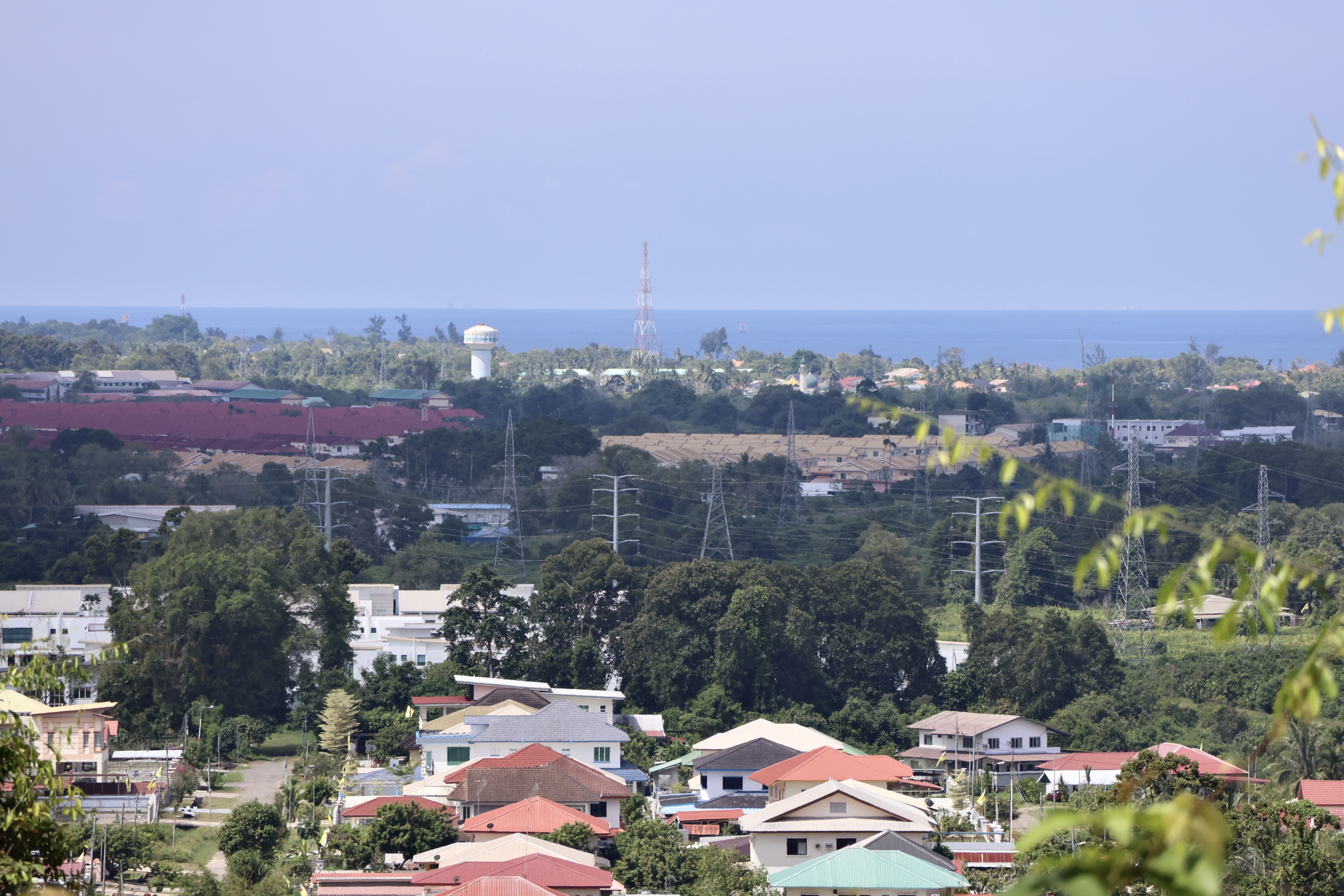
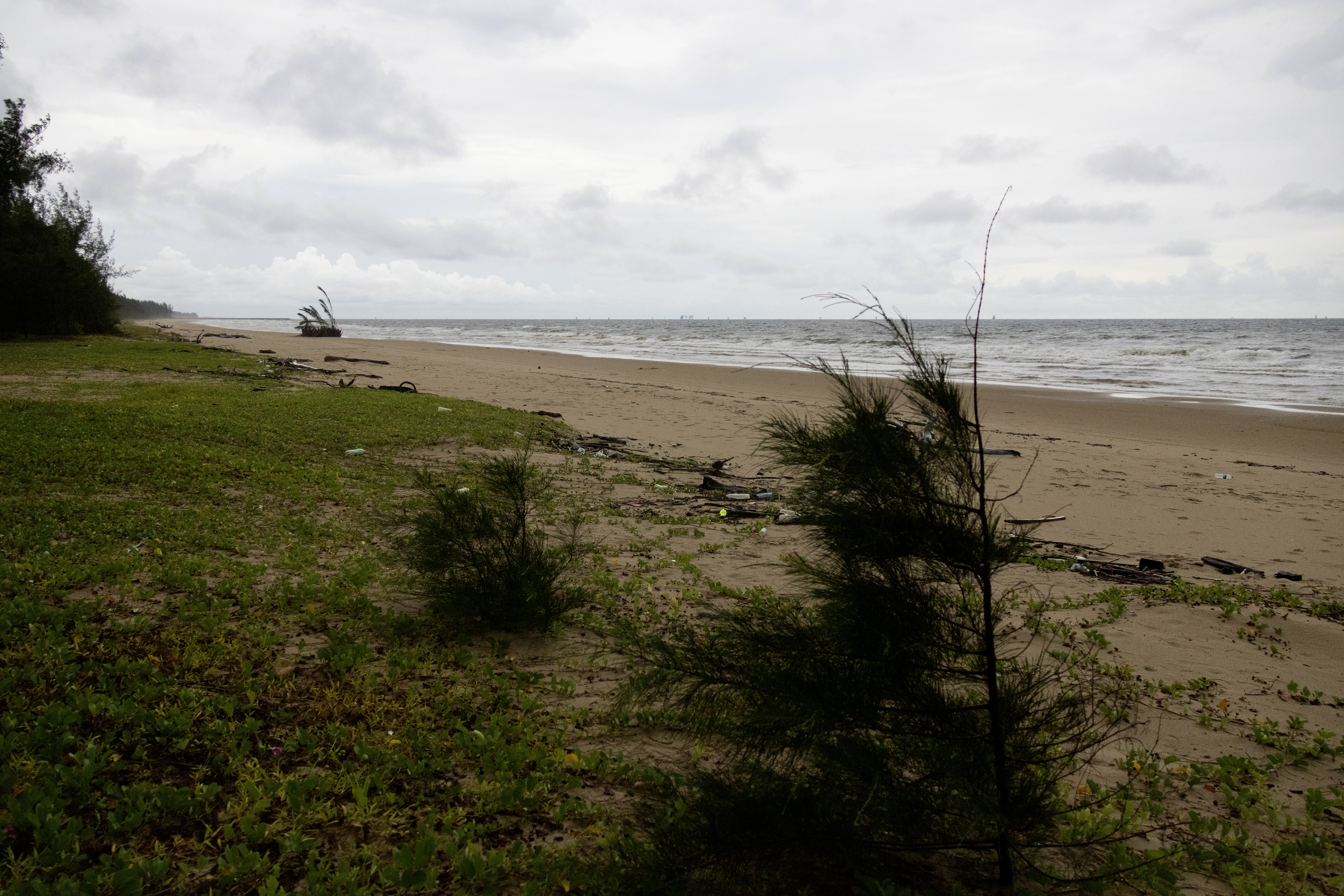
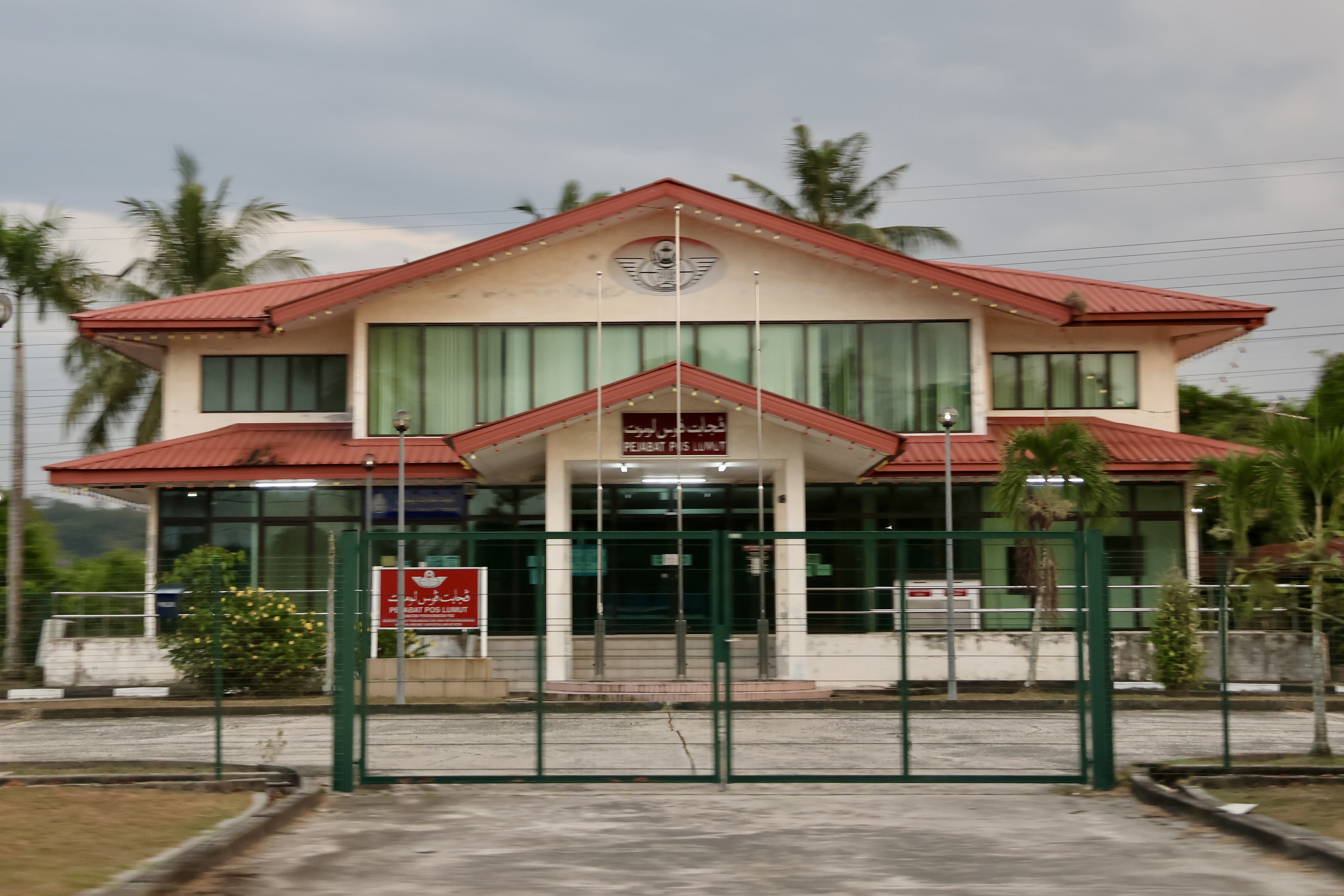
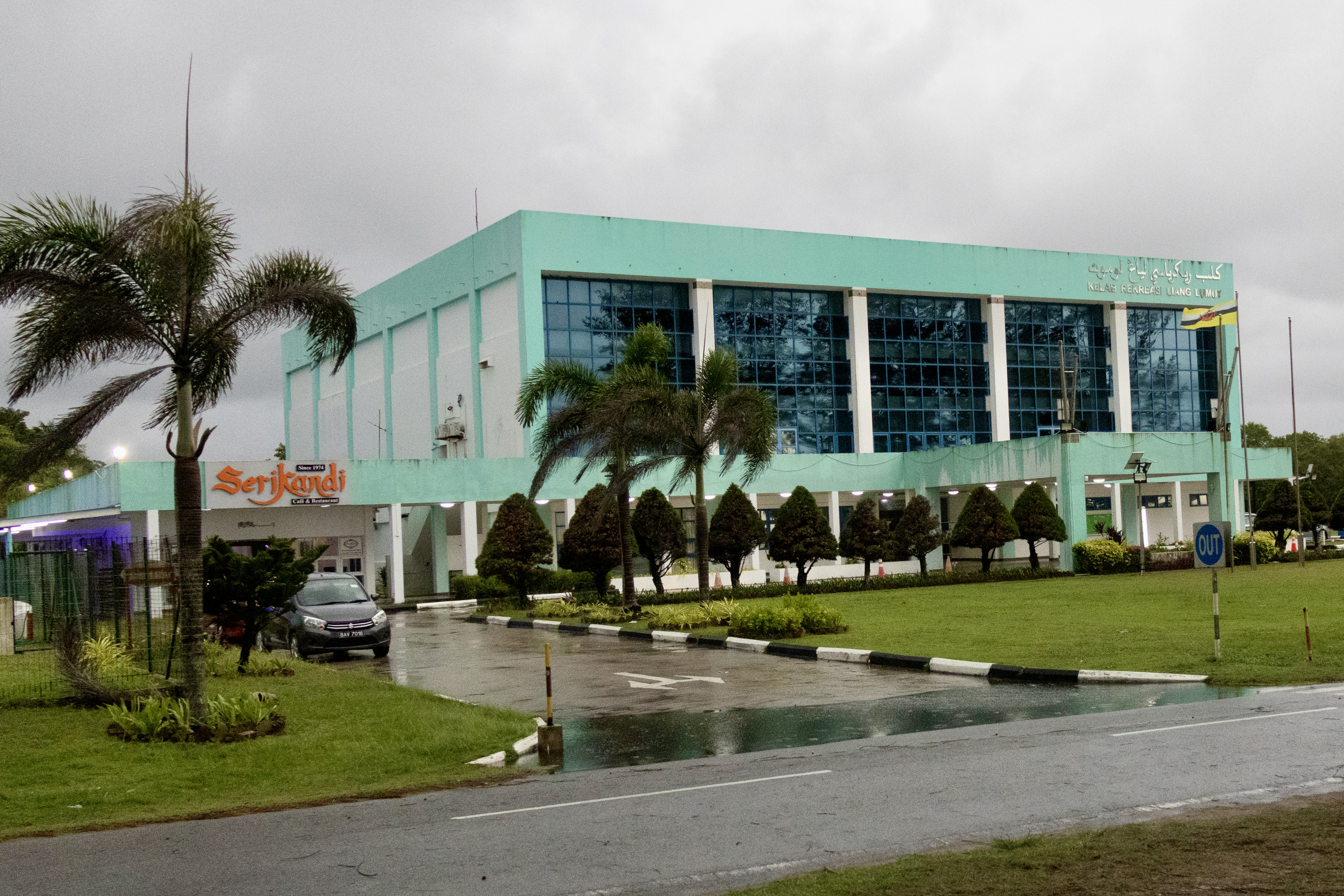
- View from Lumut Hill Lumut Beach Lumut Post Office Liang Lumut Recreational Club

- Location in Brunei
- Coordinates: 4°39′22″N 114°26′02″E
- Country: Brunei
- District: Belait
- Mukim: Liang

Government
  - Village head: Various

Population (2021) (Note: See Administration section.)
  - Total: 14,595
- Time zone: UTC+8 (BNT)

Kampong Lumut (Malay: Kampung Lumut) or commonly known as Lumut, is a coastal settlement in Belait District, Brunei Daurssalam, about 30 kilometres (19 miles) from the district town Kuala Belait. The total population was 11,273 in 2016.

== Etymology ==
The name Kampong Lumut is derived from a species of plant called lumut (moss) that thrives all over the village, especially in Kuala Sungai (now Sungai Lumut), prior to the construction of the Brunei LNG (BLNG) plant, according to sources obtained from the Heritage Magazine, which the Brunei History Centre published in September–December 2014 (the location in question is now the location of the BLNG Company building). Moss, also known as a bryophyte, is a kind of tiny, soft plant that grows in wet or shaded regions, and can range in size from one to ten centimetres. At that time, villagers made kapok from moss plants to use as pillows and beds. The residents gave the village the appellation Kampong Lumut as this plant grabbed not only the interest of the villagers, but also those from beyond the region.

== History ==
Archaeological evidence found in Lumut suggests that human activity had existed in the area as early as the 14th century; Chinese and Siamese potteries dateable to the time corresponding to the Ming dynasty had been unearthed in the vicinity of the Lumut River. However, the characteristics of the evidence suggests that the site was for burial rather than residential purpose.

In the 1980s, the number of people began to increase with the migration of people who had retired from government and private services, and chose to build houses and then reside in Lumut. At the same time, public facilities began to be built and improved such as roads, schools, post offices for the convenience and well-being of the population.

== Administration ==
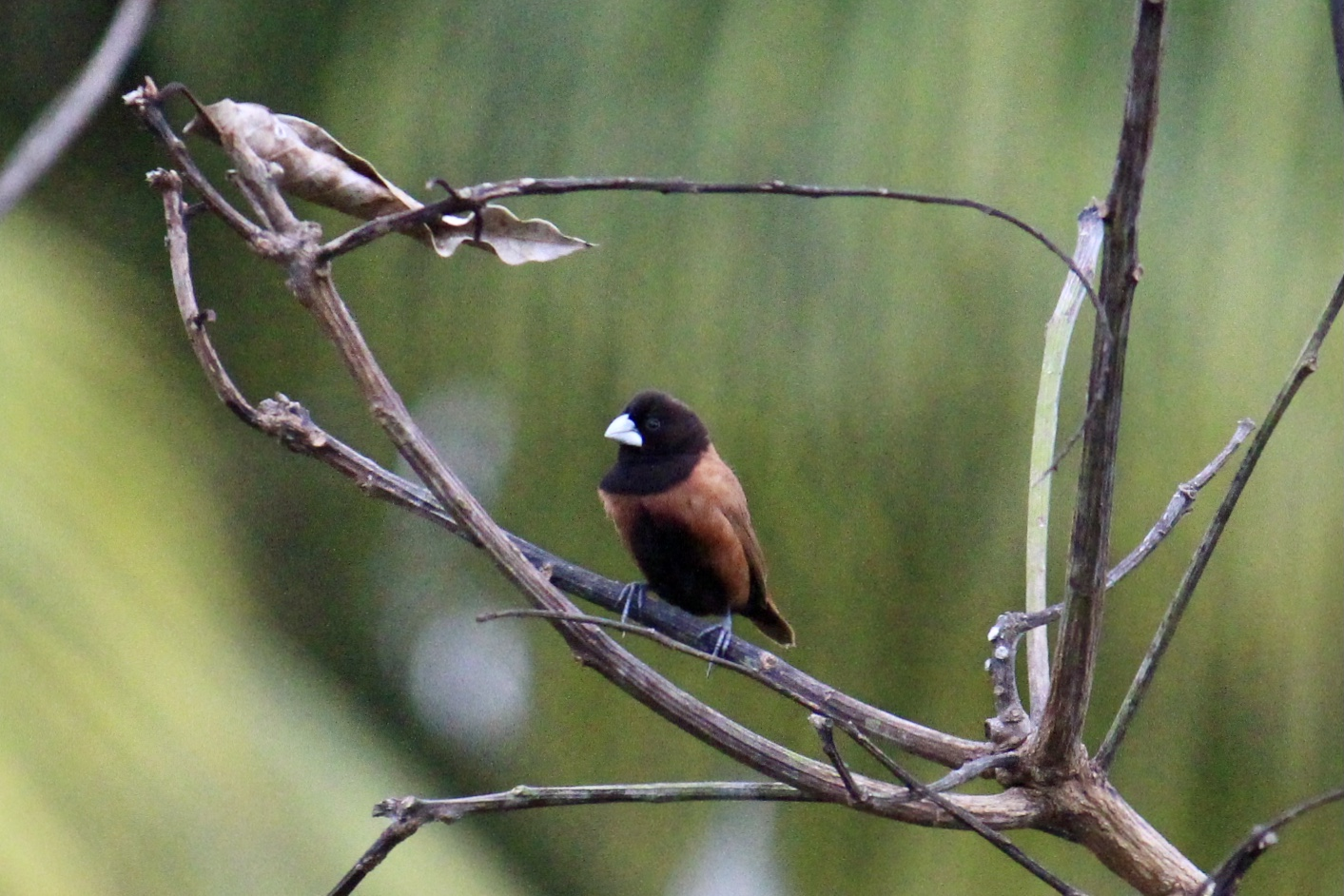
Chestnut munia pictured in Kampong Sungai Tali

For sub-division purposes, the area is divided into two villages, namely Kampong Lumut I ('one') and Kampong Lumut II ('two'), where each is overseen by a village head (ketua kampung). The village head of Kampong Lumut I oversees the following census villages:

| Village | Population (2021) | Ketua kampung (2024) | Postcode |
|---|---|---|---|
| Kampong Agis-Agis | 217 | Taib bin Haji Salleh | KC3335 |
| Kampong Lumut | 171 | Taib bin Haji Salleh | KC2935 |
| Kampong Lumut Tersusun | 1,205 | Taib bin Haji Salleh | KC4135 |
| Kampong Sungai Bakong | 1,642 | Taib bin Haji Salleh | KC4535 |
| Kampong Sungai Kang | 56 | Taib bin Haji Salleh | KC3735 |
| Kampong Sungai Kuru | 495 | Taib bin Haji Salleh | KC3935 |
| Kampong Sungai Lalit | 397 | Taib bin Haji Salleh | KC3535 |
| Total | 4,183 | | |

Meanwhile, the village head of Kampong Lumut II oversees the following census villages:

| Village | Population (2021) | Ketua kampung (2024) | Postcode |
|---|---|---|---|
| Kampong Sungai Tali | 1,051 | Haji Khairdon bin Haji Dahlan | KC4935 |
| Kampong Sungai Kayu Ara | — | Haji Khairdon bin Haji Dahlan | KC3135 |
| Kampong Sungai Taring | 857 | Haji Khairdon bin Haji Dahlan | KC4735 |
| Kampong Lumut Camp | 864 | Haji Khairdon bin Haji Dahlan | KC5735 |
| RPN Kampong Lumut Area 1 | 2,035 | Saini bin Ismail | KC5135 |
| RPN Kampong Lumut Area 2 | 5,605 | Salleh bin Haji Bujang | KC5335 |
| Total | 10,412 | | |

Kampong Lumut I and Kampong Lumut II, including the constituent census villages, are among the village subdivisions under Mukim Liang.

== Demography ==
As of 2018, there are 3,521 Bruneian Malays, 593 Chinese, 339 Ibans, and other races represented among Kampong Lumut I's inhabitants. Kampung Lumut II has a total population of 5,112 consisting of 2,315 males and 2,797 females. Some religious beliefs and customs are followed by residents in the village such as Islam, Christianity, Buddhism, and those who are not religious, and most of them work with the government and private sector and some are self-employed such as business, farming, and fishing.

== Transportation ==
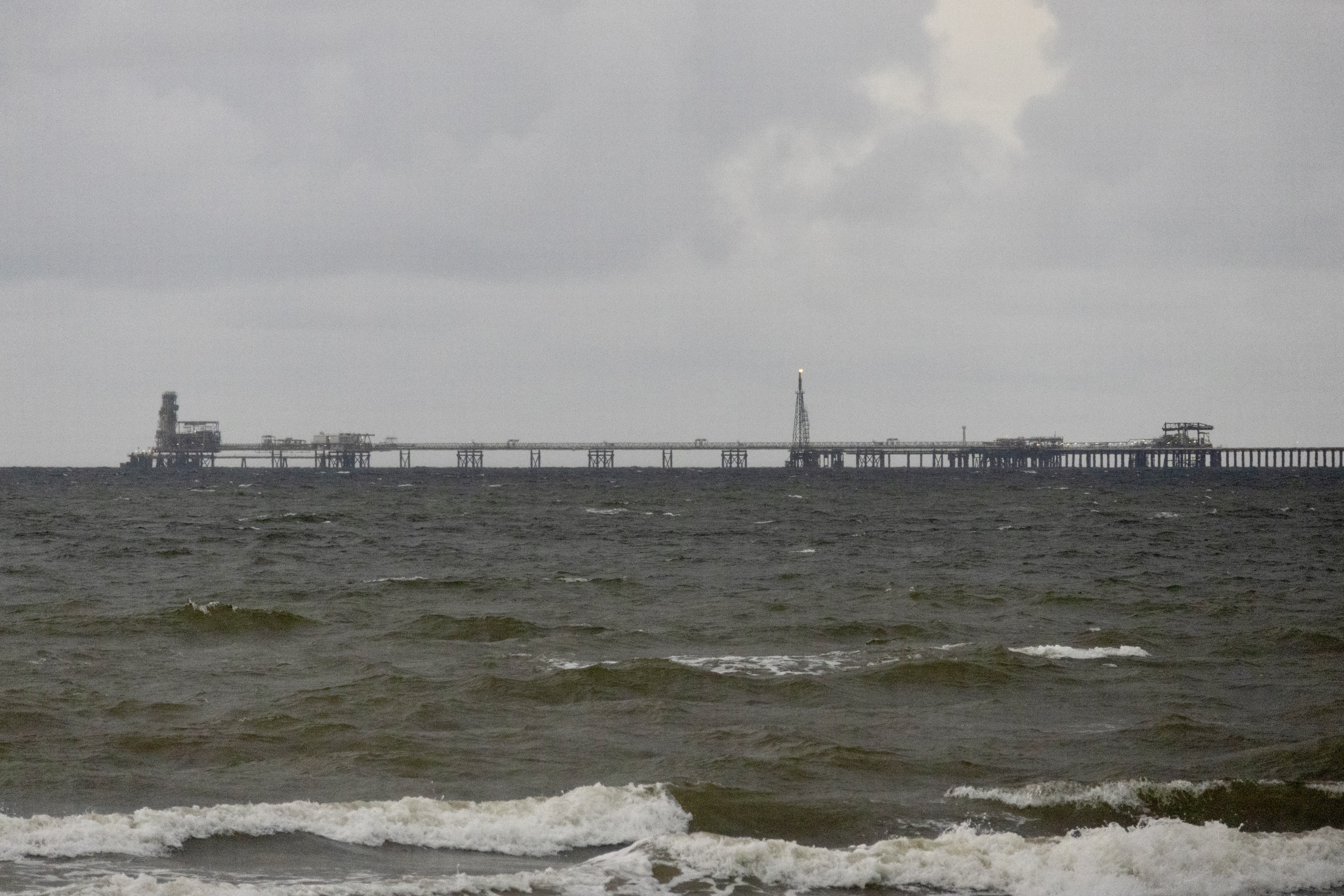
Brunei LNG terminal

=== Land ===
The village is connected via Jalan Kampong Lumut and Telisai–Lumut Highway. The three locations for Belait's feeder hub stations have been determined by the Land Transport Department (LTD), allowing residents who live distant from Seria and Kuala Belait to be more linked between the two towns. The three locations are a space close to Kampong Sungai Liang Mosque, a space outside the entrance to the Lumut National Housing Plan (RPN) along the Telisai–Lumut Highway, and a space inside the School of Science and Engineering campus for the other Kampong Lumut residents. In order for passengers to board the intra-district buses traveling to the bus terminals in Seria and Kuala Belait, feeder buses will drop them off at designated locations near the RPN Lumut, Kampong Lumut, and Mukim Liang.

=== Water ===
Gerai Aneka Jetty Lumut is close to the mouth of Lumut River, which gave rise to a variety of activities, and is located immediately off the old Jalan Kampong Lumut road leading to the Tutong and Brunei-Muara districts. Providing a location to support the activities, the area underwent a transformation with a small shelter to house the booths tended by local entrepreneurs and their businesses.

The Brunei LNG terminal at Lumut is constructed from a 430 metres (1,410 feet) new side berth and a 4.5 kilometres (2.8 miles) jetty that extends from the LNG facility.

== Infrastructure ==
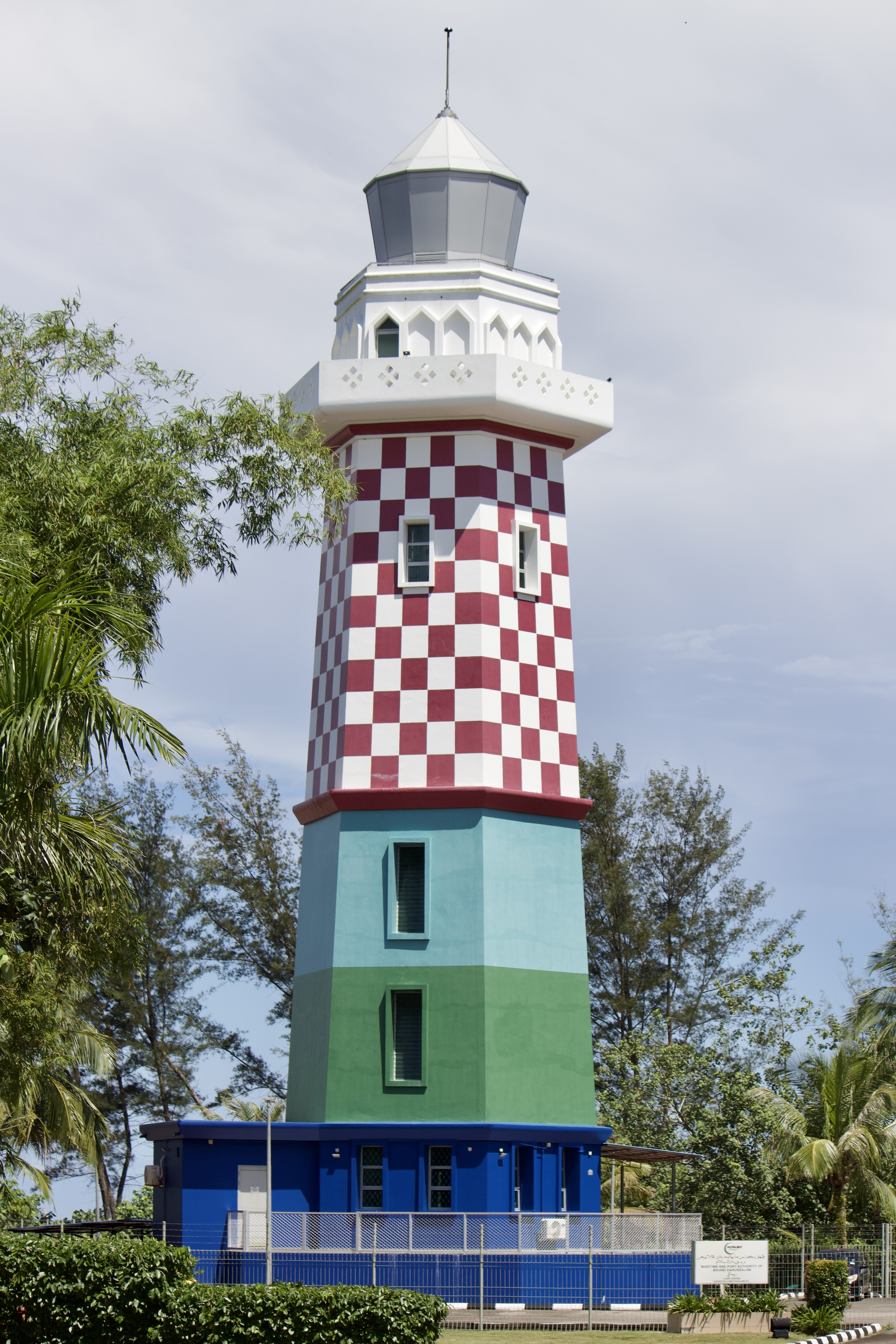
Lumut Lighthouse

The Lumut Camp (Perkhemahan Lumut) is the sole military base in the district, home to the Royal Brunei Land Force (RBLF) Third Battalion (3Bn) since 21 June 2007.

Residents of Mukim Labi's inner parts also receive water supplies from the Sungai Liang water treatment facility in Kampong Agis-Agis.

The Lumut Lighthouse sits at the coast of Kampong Sungai Kayu Ara, facing the beach.

In the district, the summit of Lumut Hill (Bukit Lumut) is used as the observation point for the month of Ramadan.

The village also has its own post office.

=== Housing ===
The area encompasses RPN Lumut, a public housing estate. At a presentation ceremony held at the multi-purpose hall of the Liang Lumut Recreational Club, Sultan Hassanal Bolkiah presented over 180 residents of the district with land grants under the Temporary Occupation Licence (TOL) Scheme for Belait District, and house keys under the Kampong Lumut / Liang National Housing Scheme during Hari Raya in 2010. The Kampong Lumut / Sungai Liang National Housing Scheme's Phases One and Two saw the construction of 294 homes, and the distribution of 164 land lots to qualified residents.

=== Education ===
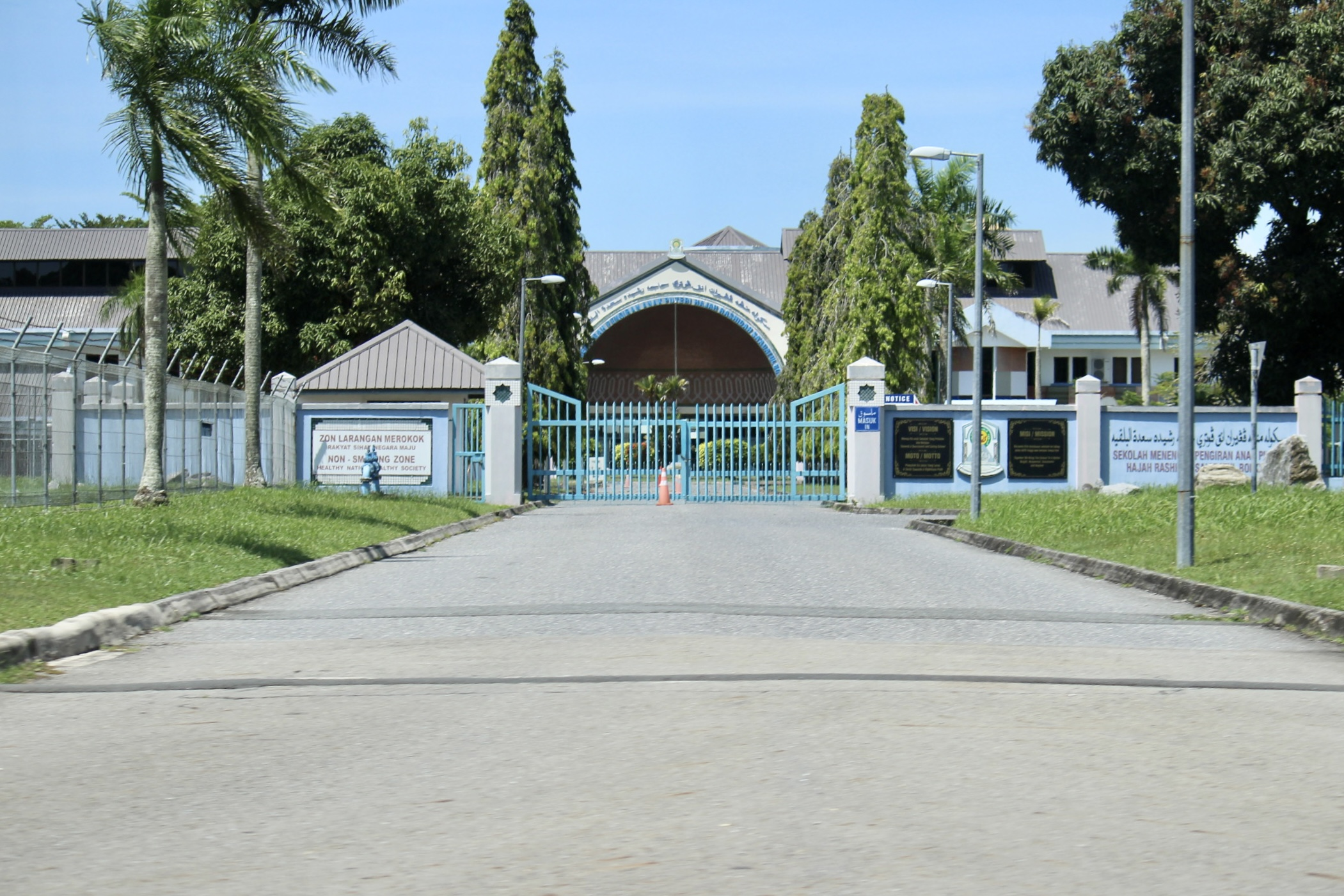
Pengiran Anak Puteri Hajah Rashidah Sa'adatul Bolkiah Secondary School

The local primary schools include Lumut Primary School and Sungai Tali Primary School. Lumut Primary School also houses Lumut Religious School, a sekolah ugama or school for the country's Islamic religious primary education. Another sekolah ugama in the area is Sungai Taring Primary School, located in a separate building adjacent to Sungai Tali Primary School.

Lumut is also home to the following educational institutions:

- Pengiran Anak Puteri Hajah Rashidah Sa'adatul Bolkiah Secondary School (SMPAP) — one of the few government secondary schools in Belait District. The school complex sits on a 16.2-hectare (40-acre) land; the construction began in November 1992 and completed in about 14 months. It was named after Princess Rashidah, the eldest daughter of Sultan Hassanal Bolkiah, with the queen consort Queen Saleha.
- School of Science and Engineering campus of Brunei Polytechnic — one of the few technical colleges in the country. The building complex was originally built and intended to be a second secondary school in the area to alleviate the growing number of students in Pengiran Anak Puteri Hajah Rashidah Sa'adatul Bolkiah Secondary School. The decision to repurpose the school into a technical college was then intended to take advantage of the school's close proximity to the country's oil and gas industry near Seria town.

=== Religion ===
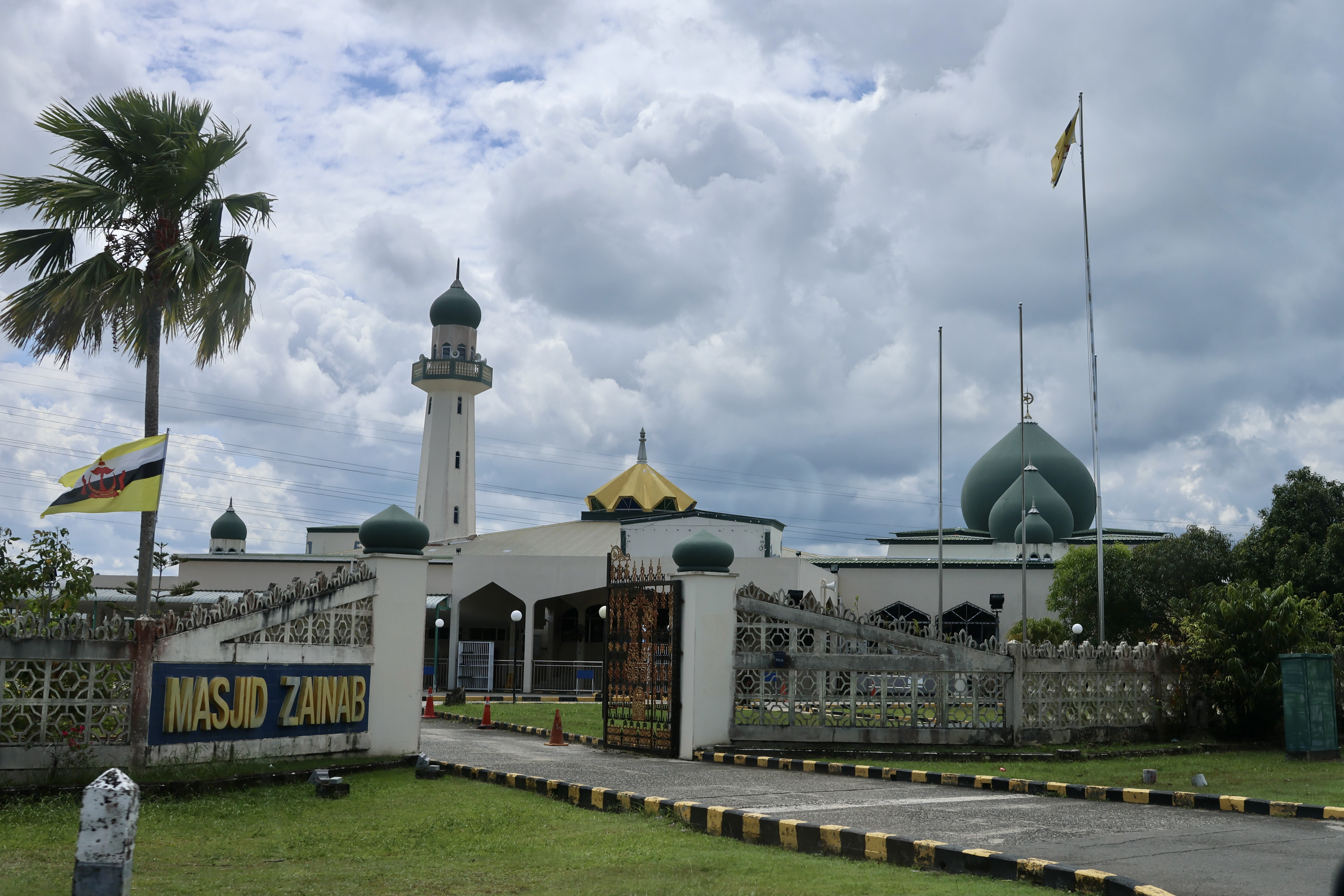
Zainab Mosque

Zainab Mosque is the sole village mosque; it was inaugurated by Sultan Hassanal Bolkiah on 22 May 1998. It can accommodate 2,000 worshippers. The mosque was constructed by a private individual, and then assigned to the religious department for upkeep. Rumour has it that the builder of this mosque was a wealthy man from Seria who had lost his daughter while she was studying in the United Kingdom.

=== Recreation ===
The area is home to Lumut Beach, a public beach recreational area. The area has restrooms, a playground, and barbecue pits. From Liang Lumut Recreation Centre, it is a two-minute drive.

It is also home to Liang Lumut Recreation Club (LLRC), which has a multipurpose hall and a small waterpark.

The space of Aneka Gerai Jetty Lumut was changed to include a small shelter to house the booths handled by neighbourhood business owners and their enterprises, providing a comfortable and handy venue to support the activities. The Welfare and Community Bureau of the Village Consultative Council (MPK) of Kampong Lumut II came up with the idea for this specific shelter, with the intention of offering a focal point for activities, and exhibiting the surrounding area.

== Economy ==
Like other villages around the nation, Kampong Lumut is actively working to improve the quality of its local goods, by heeding and supporting the Ministry of Home Affairs' appeal to make the One Village One Product Programme (1K1P) a success. Traditional sweets like bahulu and sapit are among the goods created by the residents through the Majlis Perundingan Kampung (MPK). These folks frequently take part in exhibitions organised in this nation, and several wooden souvenirs are also displayed at international exhibitions abroad.

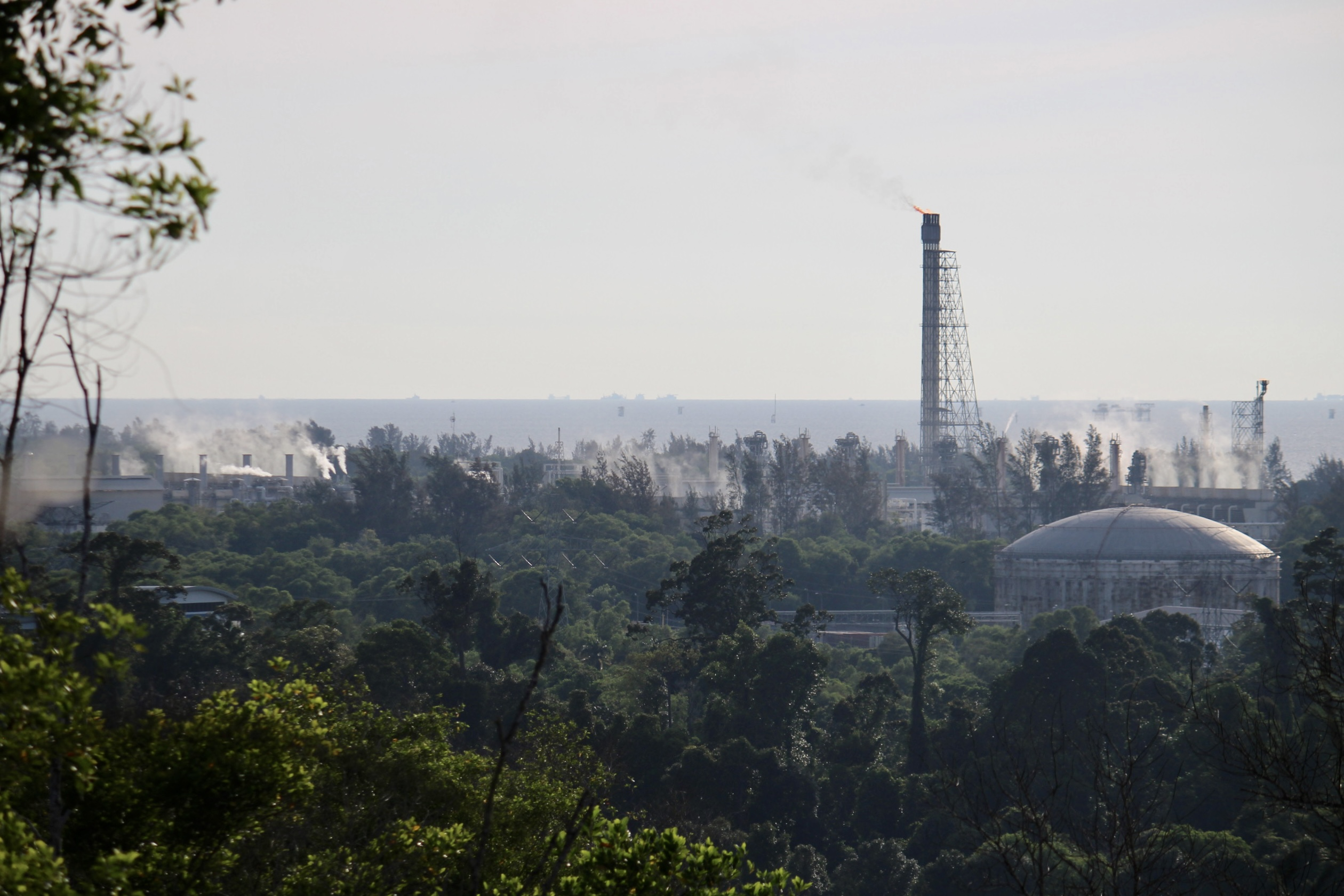
Brunei LNG plant

=== Petrol-chemical ===
The Brunei LNG plant, a 130-hectare (320-acre) liquified natural gas (LNG) plant, with annual production capacity of 6.7 million tonnes. The intended 20-year supply promise for the project was met by the 130-hectare complex. There has been a complete plant rejuvenation that has cost more than B$500 million over the course of the final five years of this arrangement. All of the plant's principal components, including the five liquefaction trains and their related buildings, were renovated as part of the revitalisation. Additionally, two new storage tanks and a new loading jetty were built.

=== Fisheries ===
Fishermen from Liang are concerned about the Lumut River's reduction in water levels, since they have to push their boats through crocodile-infested waters on foot. Despite the abundance of fish that has been available to Belait fisherman recently, dry weather has resulted in lower than typical river tides.

== Notable people ==
- Hamdillah Abdul Wahab, politician and engineer
