= Mukim Liang =

Mukim of Brunei

- Mukim
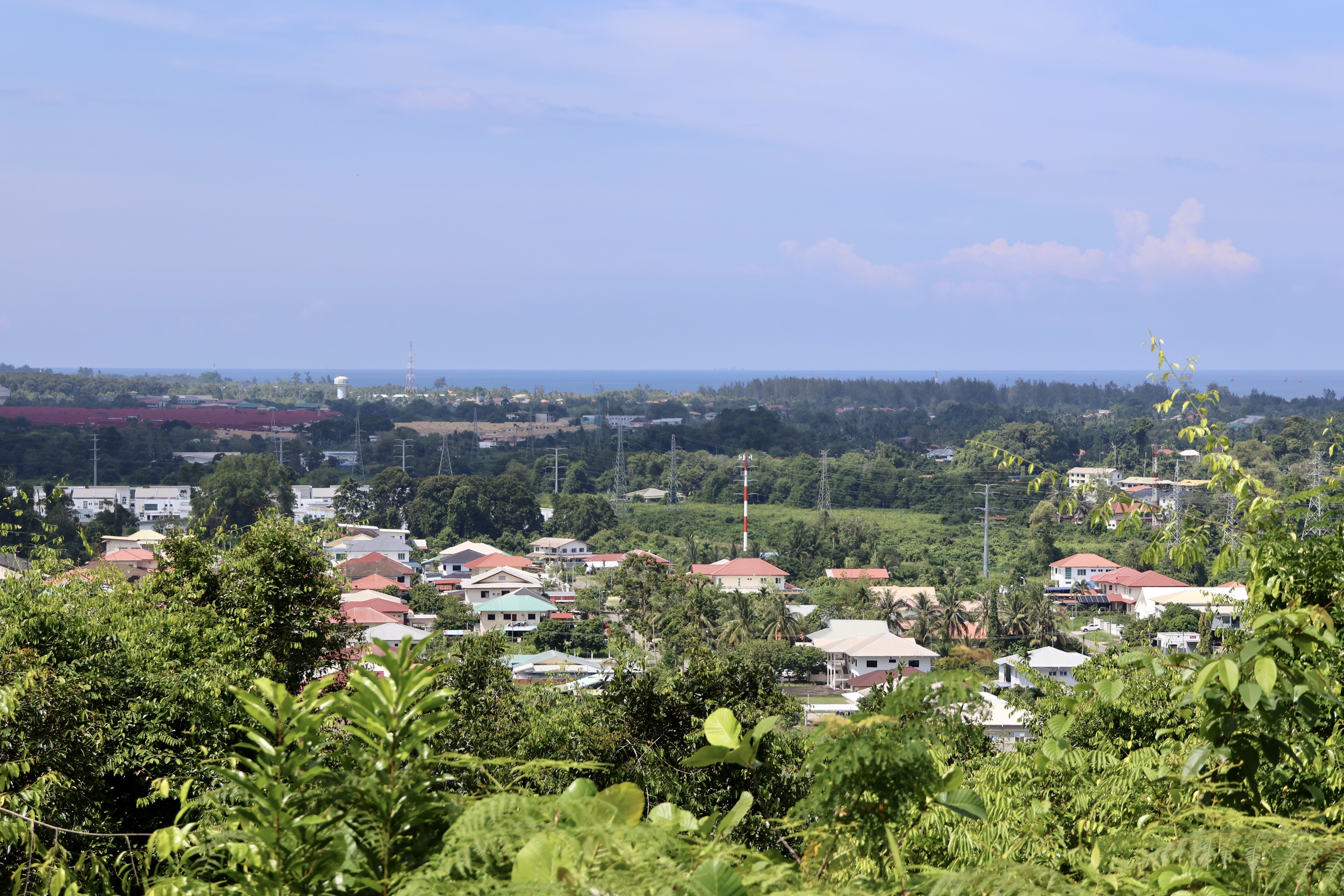
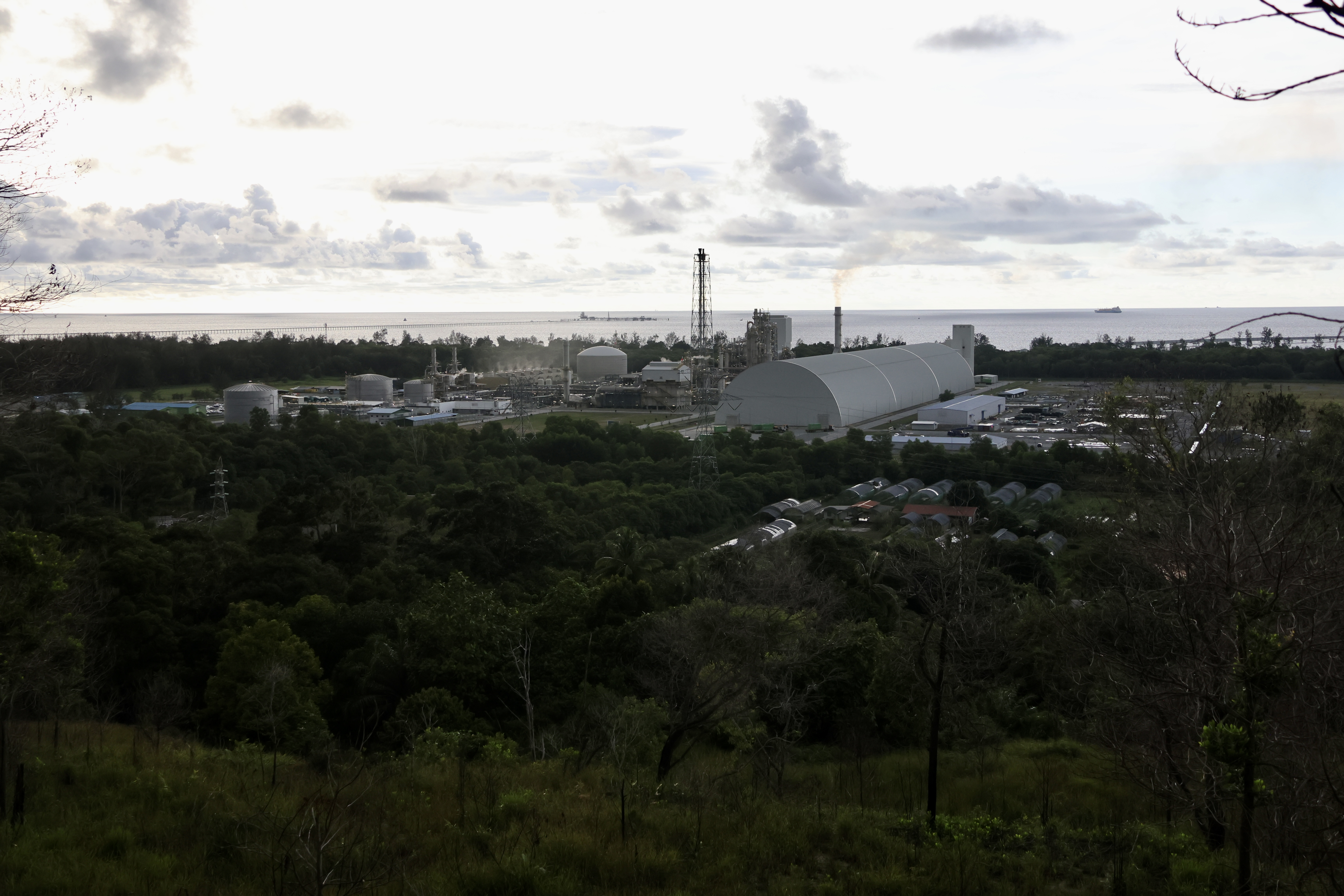
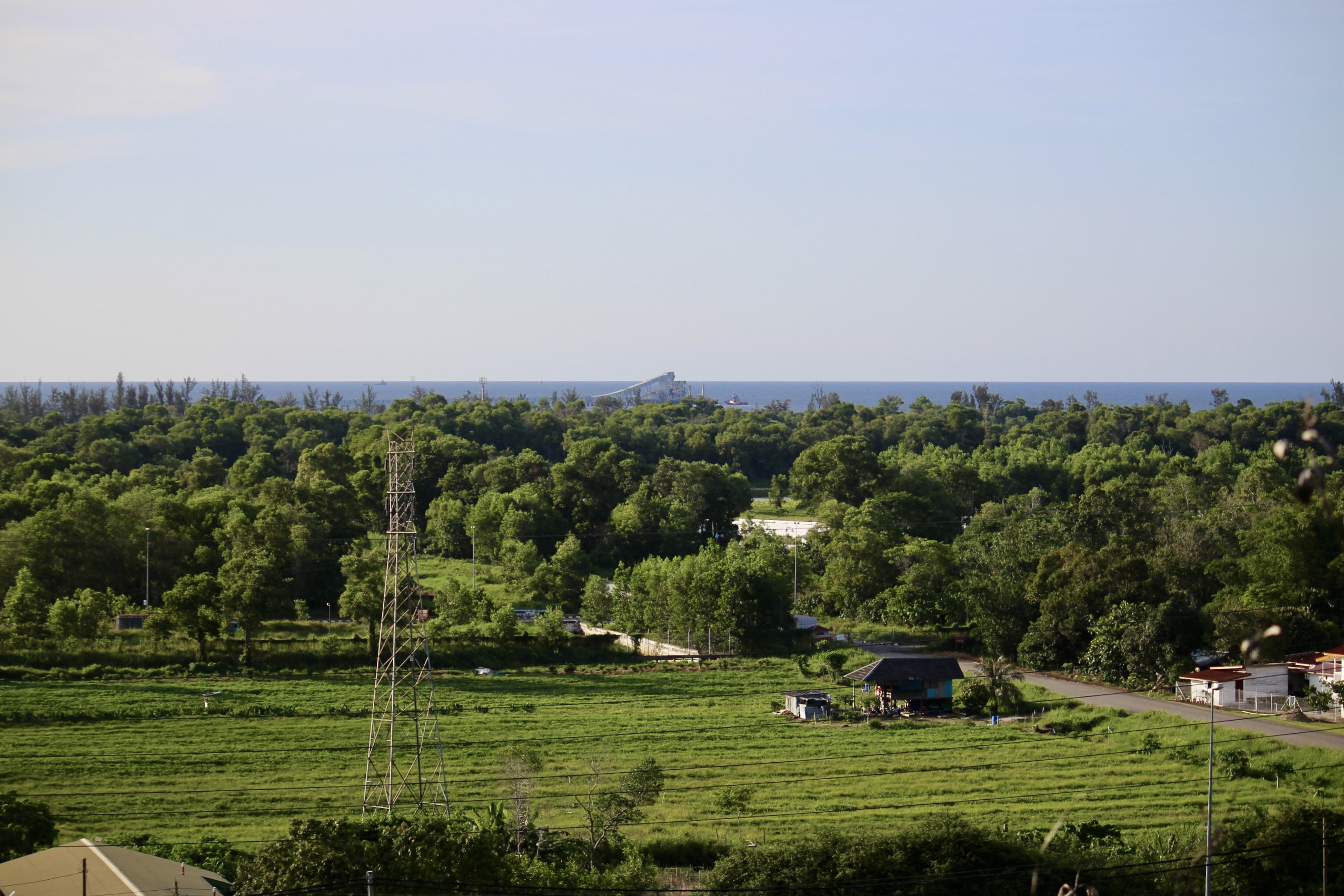
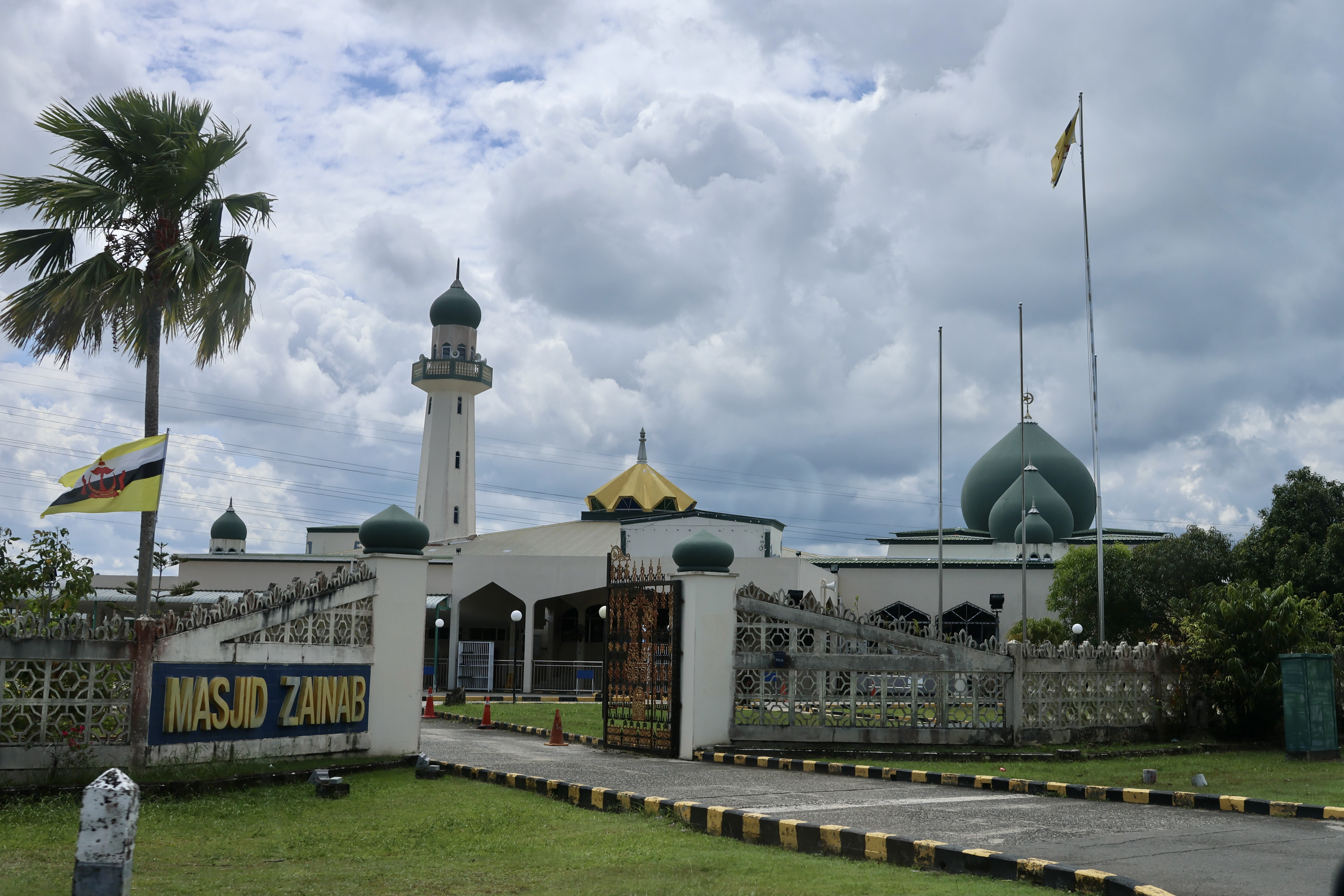
- Clockwise from top left: Lumut, Brunei Fertilizer Industries, Zainab Mosque, Sungai Gana

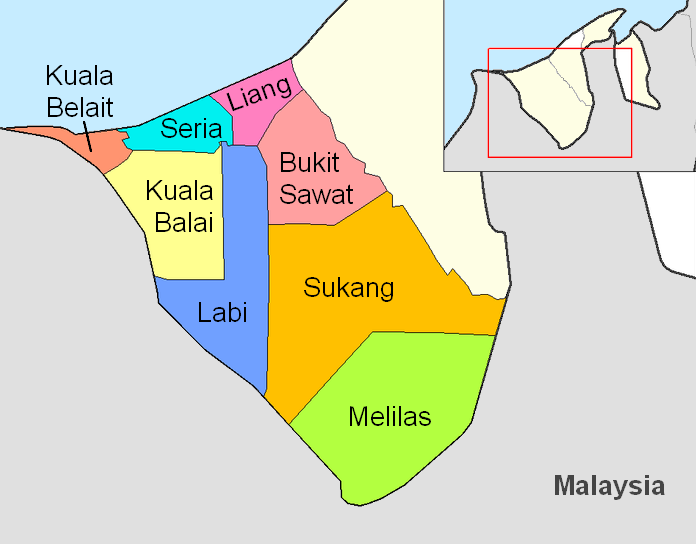
- Liang is in pink.
- Coordinates: 4°39′36″N 114°27′32″E
- Country: Brunei
- District: Belait

Government
  - Penghulu: Yamin Abdul Ranni

Population (2021)
  - Total: 16,813
- Time zone: UTC+8 (BNT)
- Postcode: KCxx35

Mukim Liang is a mukim in Belait District, Brunei. The population was 14,301 in 2016.

== Geography ==
The mukim is located in the north of the district, bordering the South China Sea to the north, Mukim Telisai in Tutong District to the north-east, Mukim Bukit Sawat to the south-east, Mukim Labi to the south and Mukim Seria to the west.

== Demographics ==
As of 2016 census, the population was 14,301 with 51.4% males and 48.6% females. The mukim had 2,607 households occupying 2,602 dwellings. Among the population, 32.3% lived in urban areas, while the remainder of 67.7% lived in rural areas.

== Administration ==
As of 2021, the mukim comprised the following villages:

Settlements	Population (2021)	Ketua kampung (2024)
Kampong Sungai Tali	1,051	Haji Khairdon bin Haji Dahlan
Kampong Sungai Taring	857	Haji Khairdon bin Haji Dahlan
Kampong Sungai Bakong	1,642	Taib bin Haji Salleh
Kampong Sungai Kuru	495	Taib bin Haji Salleh
Kampong Lumut	171	Taib bin Haji Salleh
Kampong Lumut Camp	864	—N/a
RPN Kampong Lumut Area 1	2,035	Saini bin Ismail
RPN Kampong Lumut Area 2	5,605	Salleh bin Haji Bujang
Kampong Lumut Tersusun	1,205	Taib bin Haji Salleh
Kampong Sungai Kang	56	Taib bin Haji Salleh
Kampong Sungai Lalit	397	Taib bin Haji Salleh
Kampong Agis-Agis	217	Taib bin Haji Salleh
Kampong Perumpong	427	—N/a
Kampong Sungai Liang	641	Mohammad Haszrin bin Bagol
Kampong Tunggulian	656	—N/a
Kampong Lilas	148	—N/a
Kampong Sungai Gana	160	—N/a
Kampong Keluyoh	186	—N/a
