= Jerudong Park Amphitheatre =

Amphitheatre in Bandar Seri Begawan, Brunei

Jerudong Park Playground & Country Club Amphitheatre
- Jerudong Park Playground & Country Club Amphitheatre
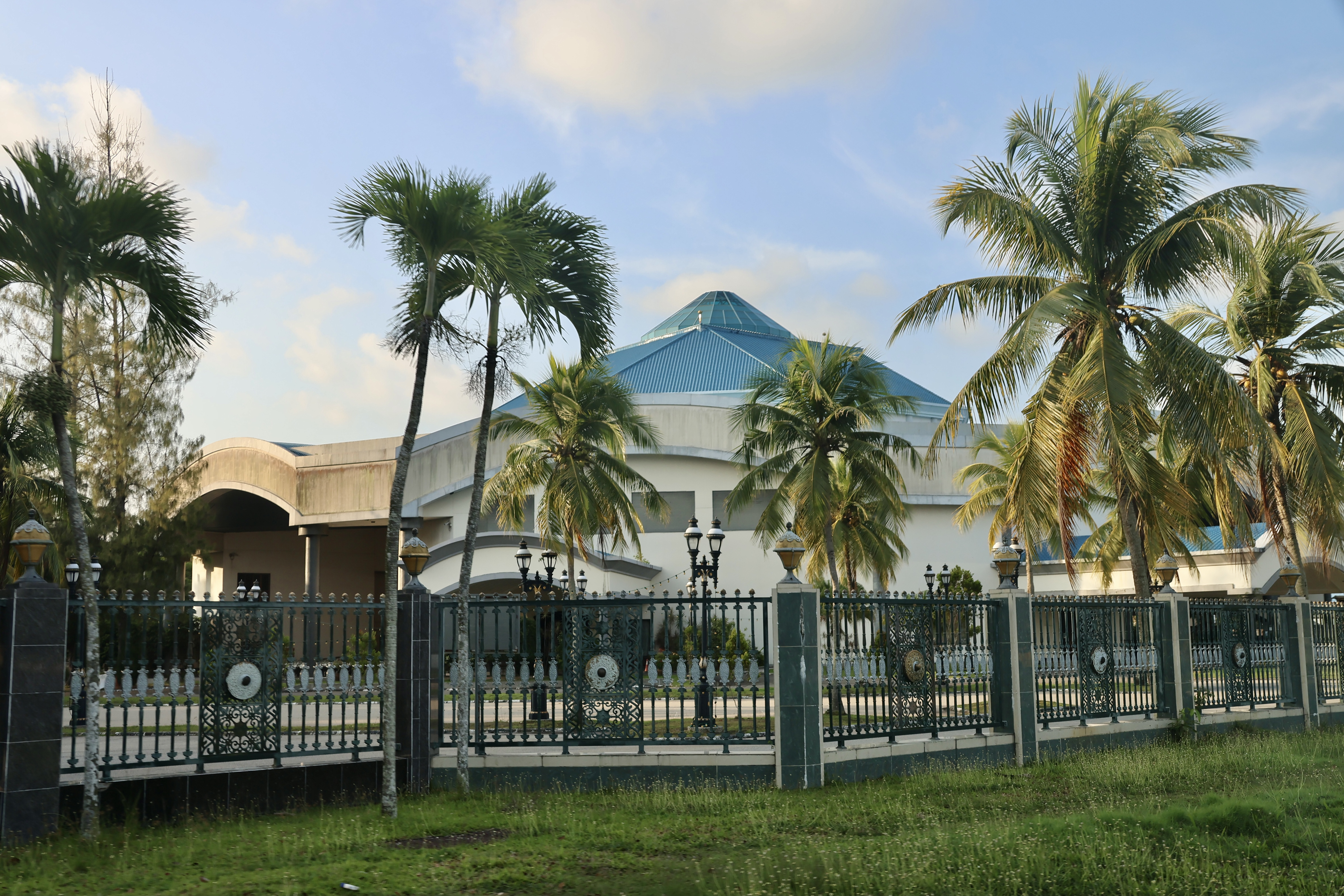
- Amphitheater in 2023

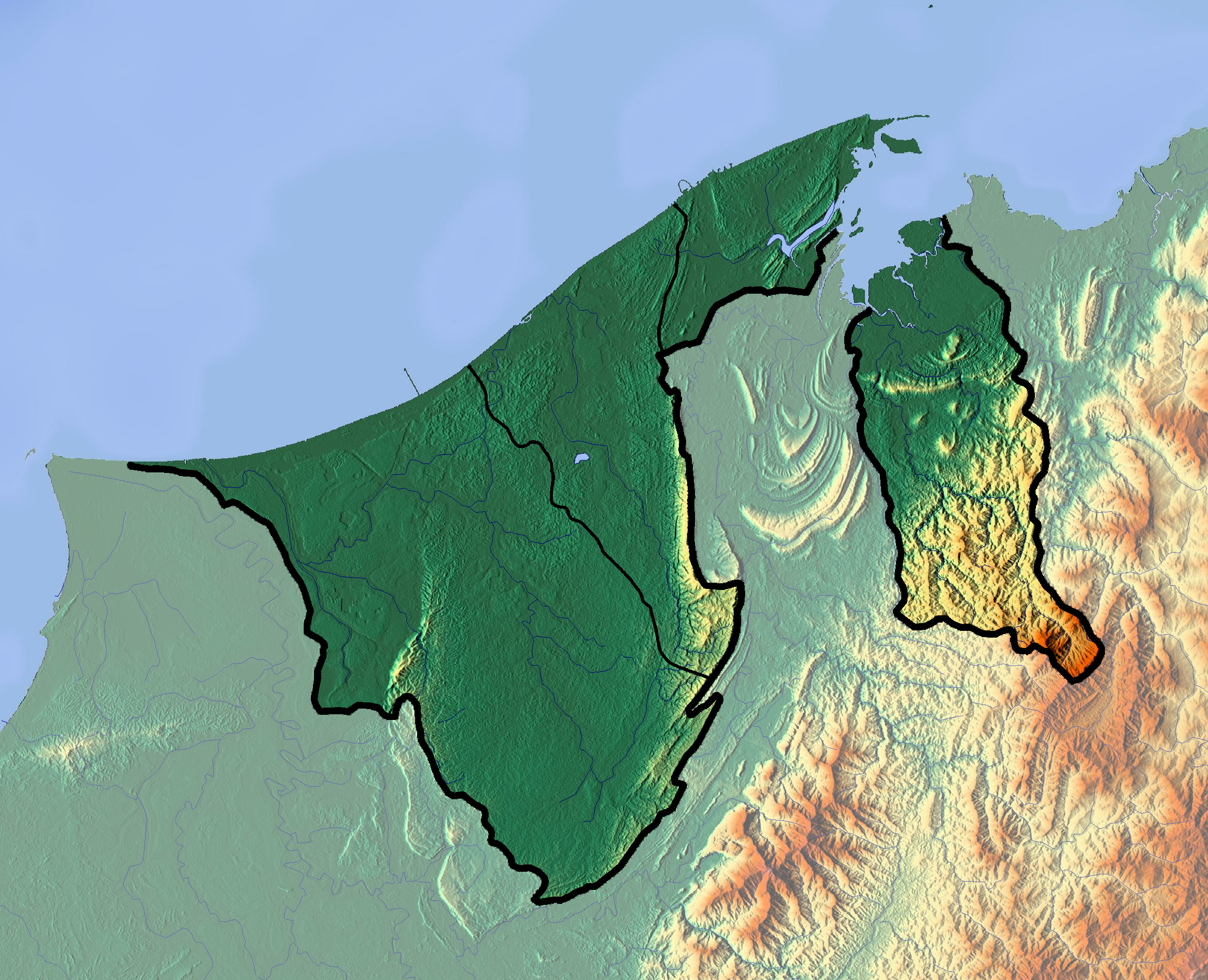
- Location within Southeast Asia Location within Borneo Location within Brunei
- Interactive map of Jerudong Park Playground & Country Club Amphitheatre
- Address: Bandar Seri Begawan; Brunei
- Location: Jerudong Park Garden, Bandar Seri Begawan
- Coordinates: 4°55′59″N 114°49′59″E
- Owner: The Bruneian Government (1995–present)
- Seating type: Chevron
- Capacity: Over 60,000
- Executive suites: 2
- Record attendance: 60,000

Construction
- Built: 1995–1996
- Opened: July 16, 1996
- Renovated: 2011
- Years active: July 16, 1996 – present

The Jerudong Park Amphitheatre is an amphitheater at Jerudong Park in Bandar Seri Begawan, Brunei. The amphitheatre was built for a free Michael Jackson concert for the Sultan Hassanal Bolkiah's fiftieth birthday in 1996. The theater is located in Jerudong Park's Garden, designed with only a roof and its capacity is over 60,000. The stage is removable and can be replaced with another stage.

When Michael Jackson performed at the theater, he replaced the built-in stage with his own stage, from the Dangerous World Tour. When he returned for the HIStory World Tour, Jackson used the stage for the tour minus the cherry picker, A Curtain for the smooth criminal opening and a Statue Of Jackson. Whitney Houston and Janet Jackson, however, used the built-in stage. The theater is now used for wedding receptions, fundraiser events, and concerts.

== Concerts ==
=== Michael Jackson ===
On July 16, 1996, American singer-songwriter and pop icon Michael Jackson performed a free concert for Sultan Hassanal Bolkiah's fiftieth birthday. 60,000 people were in attendance. The concert resembled one from his previous Dangerous World Tour. Jackson was reportedly paid $17 million (equivalent to $35 million in 2025). Jackson would return to the venue, later that year, on December 31, as part of the HIStory World Tour; the Sultan was not in attendance.

=== Whitney Houston ===
On August 24, 1996, American singer-actress Whitney Houston performed a concert for Princess Rashidah's wedding. The concert resembled one from her previous The Bodyguard World Tour. Houston also performed "The Greatest Love of All" and "Exhale (Shoop Shoop)". The concert was attended by the Sultan, Princess Rashidah, and her husband 'Abdul Rahim. Houston was paid $7 million (equivalent to $14 million in 2025) by the Sultan's brother, Prince Jefri.

=== Janet Jackson ===
During her Velvet Rope Tour, American singer Janet Jackson performed a concert for Princess Hamidah's twenty-first birthday, on April 22, 1998. British-Canadian girl group All Saints was the opening act and CDs of the performance were given to everyone in attendance. "Rope Burn", "Black Cat", and "What About" were not performed, possibility due to censorship reasons, and "Happy Birthday" was sung to the princess.
