= 2024–25 DPMM FC season =

20th season in existence of DPMM FC

DPMM
2024–25 season
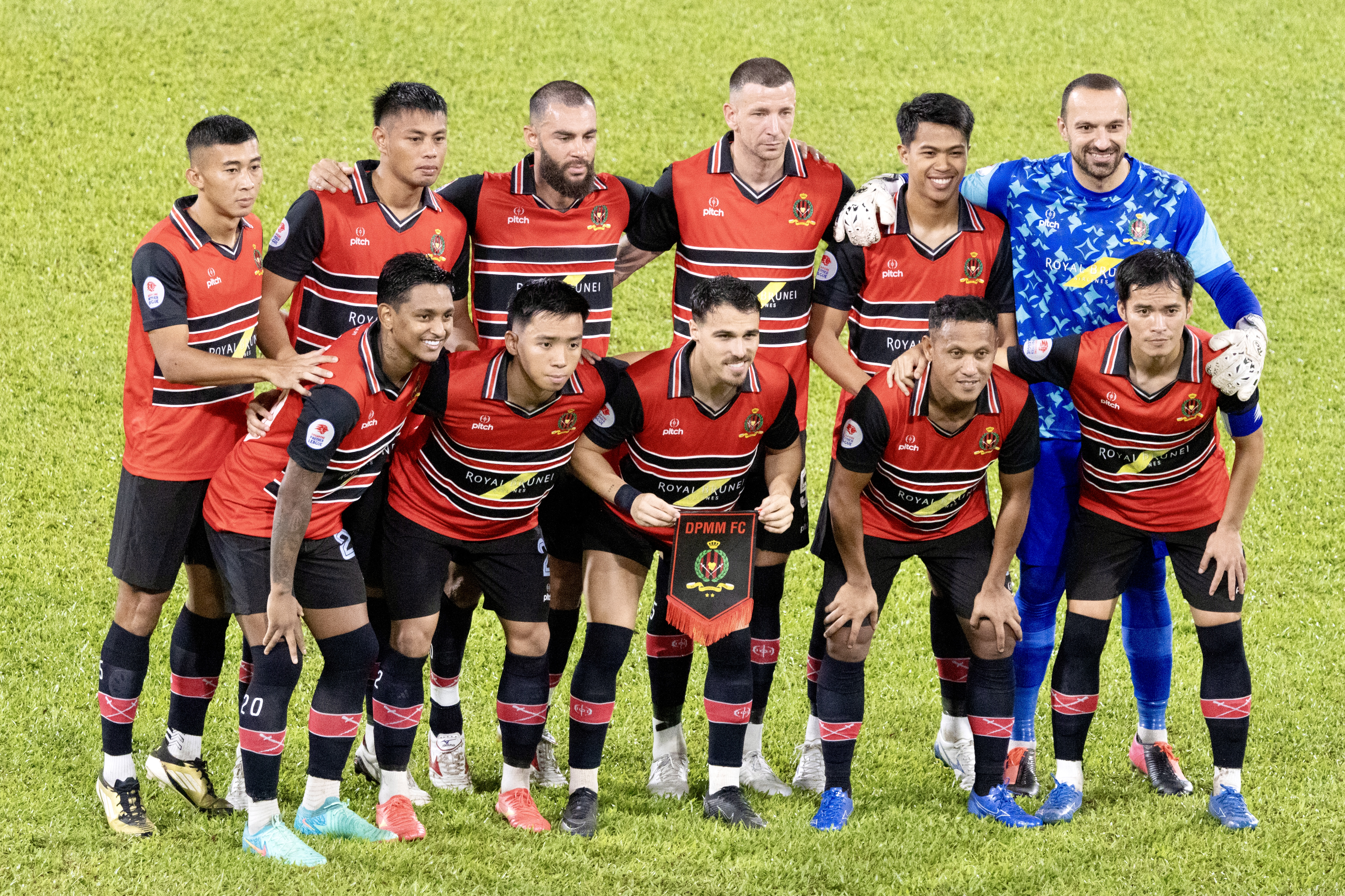
- Mid-season friendly match
- Chairman: HRH Prince Al-Muhtadee Billah
- Head coach: (Scotland) Jamie McAllister
- Stadium: Hassanal Bolkiah National Stadium
- Singapore Premier League: 5th
Home colours	Away colours

The 2024–25 season is DPMM's 11th season in the top flight of Singaporean football, the Singapore Premier League in which the club also competed in the Singapore Cup.

In addition, the club also entered a second team in the 2024–25 Brunei Super League, which is composed of mostly the under-20 team that won the FABD Under-20 Youth League earlier in the year. The team finished in second place behind Kasuka FC, and afterwards won the 12-team 2025 Brunei FA Cup by beating Indera SC 1–0 in the final on 18 May.

== Review ==
=== Pre-season ===
The 2024–25 Singapore Premier League season will be the first season to be played over a winter schedule across two years. DPMM played a series of friendlies at the Hassanal Bolkiah National Stadium in which they were finally allowed to use the stadium after the conclusion of renovations since 2021.

On 6 April, DPMM played a friendly match against Brunei Super League club MS ABDB in which the club won 4–1. DPMM than played another pre-season friendly match against China League One club Guangxi Pingguo Haliao at home where new signing Gabriel Gama and Miguel Oliveira scored in the match alongside Azwan Ali Rahman, which ended 3–1.

On 19 April, DPMM along with Singaporean club Balestier Khalsa and Laotian club Young Elephants were invited by Malaysia Super League club Selangor to participate in the 2024 Selangor Asia Challenge pre-season mini tournament on 26–28 April. DPMM registered a 4–0 loss to the hosts and a 3–3 draw against Balestier, which placed them in third for the tournament.

On 30 April, a DPMM FC selection played an exhibition game against former English Premier League stars at the imagine Football Fiesta. The game ended 4–2 to the home team.

=== First half of season (May-Dec 2024) ===
DPMM started brightly with two wins in as many games in May, but technical difficulties at their Hassanal Bolkiah National Stadium home ground forced them to play what was to be the first Singapore Premier League fixture to be held away from Singapore since 2021 at Jalan Besar Stadium instead, against Lion City Sailors which they lost 0–2. The same week, they managed to draw 3–3 against the visiting Geylang International after finally managing to play at their home stadium.

On 12 June, DPMM announced that Patrick Flottmann had suffered a ruptured ACL which will keep him away for a significant amount of the season.

On 5 July, DPMM announced that head coach Rui Capela was leaving the club due to personal reasons, ahead of a 4–2 away loss to Balestier Khalsa. He was replaced by Jamie McAllister four days after the announcement.

The club endured a nine-match winless streak from 18 June, picking up only three points all at their home ground, until the fixture against Geylang International on 24 August where they recorded a 2–4 away win.

DPMM produced their best performance of the season so far in a 3–2 win at their home ground against BG Tampines on 22 September, ending the Stags' unbeaten record while also ushering their first win of the season at the Hassanal Bolkiah National Stadium.

After scoring only six goals in 14 matches, Mexican import striker Julio Cruz was released by the club on 31 October 2024.

=== Second half of season (Jan-May 2025) ===
DPMM prepared for the second half of the campaign by securing the signing of Serbian-born Iceland international centre-back Damir Muminovic to replace Flottmann as early as August. They also boosted their defence by bringing back Wafi Aminuddin after a spell at Kasuka FC and also Na'im Tarif who was last with the club in 2016. They bolstered their attack by signing Dāvis Ikaunieks from Latvia and also established Brunei international Hariz Danial Khallidden from MS ABDB.

A week before they resumed their SPL season, DPMM played Malaysia Super League side Kuching City in a friendly at home on 4 January. The two sides drew 1–1, with Muminovic scoring just five minutes into his first outing with the team.

DPMM started the second half of the season with a 2–4 defeat to Lion City Sailors at home on 13 January 2025. This was followed by a 0–2 loss at the hands of Geylang International five days later. A 2–3 home defeat to Balestier Khalsa on 7 February happened right after a 3–0 capitulation to bottom side Tanjong Pagar United on 26 January that left DPMM to suffer four consecutive defeats in the league.

Another defeat to BG Tampines Rovers on 23 February stretched the losing streak to five, but three days later an Ikaunieks double stopped the rut in a 2–1 victory over Hougang United at Jalan Besar Stadium.

DPMM's Singapore Cup campaign started on 1 February with a hard-fought 1–1 draw against BG Tampines Rovers with Nazry Aiman Azaman producing an equaliser in the fifth minute of stoppage time. They then enjoyed consecutive victories against Young Lions and Albirex Niigata (S) until a 1–5 reverse against Hougang United on 15 March leaves the Bruneian side hoping for the result in the last matchday between Tampines and Hougang on the 29th to be in their favour. The game finished 5–1 to Tampines, which means DPMM would keep their semi-final berth up against Lion City Sailors on 21–27 May.

Ikaunieks' brace in the Hougang fixture catapulted him to a run in form where he scored two goals against Albirex, Geylang and Tanjong Pagar to help DPMM go six matches unbeaten in the league, a record only equaled by Lion City Sailors whom they also fought a goalless draw with. In a clash of in-form teams on 11 May, DPMM prevailed against Balestier Khalsa with a score of 3–4 after being 3–1 down in the first half, with Ikaunieks scoring a hat–trick. At the end of the season, DPMM became unbeaten in nine games with six straight victories after their final fixture against Hougang United finished 2-3, Oliveira scoring the winning goal. As a result, they leapfrogged Albirex to a fifth place finish.

DPMM would finish their Singapore Cup campaign with a 2–5 aggregate loss to eventual winners Lion City Sailors in the semi-finals.

== Squad ==
=== Singapore Premier League squad ===
No.	Name	Nationality	Date of birth (age)	Previous club	Contract start	Contract end
Goalkeepers
1	Kristijan Naumovski	(North Macedonia)	17 September 1988 (age 38)	(North Macedonia) KF Shkupi	2023	2025
12	Haimie Abdullah Nyaring	(Brunei)	31 May 1998 (age 28)	(Brunei) Indera SC	2018	2025
25	Ishyra Asmin Jabidi	(Brunei)	9 July 1998 (age 28)	(Brunei) MS ABDB	2024	2025
Defenders
2	Syafiq Safiuddin Abdul Shariff	(Brunei)	16 July 2002 (age 24)	(Brunei) Indera SC	2024	2025
3	Abdul Mu'iz Sisa	(Brunei)	20 April 1991 (age 35)	(Brunei) Indera SC	2016	2025
4	Hanif Farhan Azman	(Brunei)	2 November 2000 (age 25)	Youth	2020	2025
5	Damir Muminovic	(Iceland)	13 May 1990 (age 36)	(Iceland) Breiðablik	2025	2025
13	Hanif Hamir	(Brunei)	22 February 1997 (age 29)	(Brunei) Tabuan Muda	2017	2025
19	Nur Ikhwan Othman	(Brunei)	15 January 1993 (age 33)	(Brunei) Indera SC	2016	2025
21	Nazry Aiman Azaman	(Brunei)	1 July 2004 (age 22)	(Brunei) MS ABDB	2024	2025
23	Yura Indera Putera Yunos	(Brunei)	25 March 1996 (age 30)	(Brunei) Majra	2015	2025
24	Wafi Aminuddin	(Brunei)	20 September 2000 (age 26)	(Brunei) Kasuka FC	2025	2025
Midfielders
6	Azwan Saleh	(Brunei)	6 January 1988 (age 38)	(Brunei) Indera SC	2006	2025
7	Azwan Ali Rahman	(Brunei)	11 January 1992 (age 34)	(Brunei) Indera SC	2013	2025
8	Faturrahman Embran	(Brunei)	22 August 1999 (age 27)	(Brunei) Kota Ranger	2024	2025
10	Farshad Noor	(Afghanistan) (Netherlands)	2 October 1994 (age 32)	(India) Gokulam Kerala	2023	2025
11	Najib Tarif	(Brunei)	5 February 1988 (age 38)	(Brunei) Indera SC	2012	2025
14	Na'im Tarif	(Brunei)	1 November 1996 (age 29)	(Brunei) MS PPDB	2025	2025
16	Abdul Hariz Herman	(Brunei)	24 August 2000 (age 26)	(Brunei) MS ABDB	2024	2025
Strikers
9	Miguel Oliveira	(Portugal)	22 June 1995 (age 31)	(Kuwait) Al Yarmouk	2024	2025
15	Hariz Danial Khallidden	(Brunei)	1 November 1996 (age 29)	(Brunei) MS ABDB	2025	2025
17	Hakeme Yazid Said	(Brunei)	8 February 2003 (age 23)	Youth	2019	2025
18	Dāvis Ikaunieks	(Latvia)	7 January 1994 (age 32)	(Lithuania) FA Šiauliai	2025	2025
20	Gabriel Gama ^{FP U21}	(Brazil)	14 May 2003 (age 23)	(Brazil) Catanduva U20	2024	2025
22	Nazirrudin Ismail	(Brunei)	27 December 1998 (age 27)	(Brunei) MS PPDB	2023	2025
Players who left during season
	Danish Firdaus Roddy Suhardy	(Brunei)	23 January 2006 (age 20)	Youth	2024	2025
	Patrick Flottmann	(Australia)	19 April 1997 (age 29)	(South Korea) Seongnam	2024	2025
	Haziq Naqiuddin Syamra	(Brunei)	25 May 2004 (age 22)	(Brunei) Kota Ranger	2024	2025
	Safwan Zawawi Sazalee	(Brunei)	8 June 2006 (age 20)	(Singapore) Woodlands Warriors (Amateur)	2024	2025
	Julio Cruz	(Mexico)	23 November 1995 (age 30)	(Mexico) Alebrijes de Oaxaca	2024	2025

Remarks:
^{FP U21} These players are registered as U21 foreign players.

=== Brunei Super League squad ===
No.	Name	Nationality	Date of birth (age)	Previous club	Contract start	Contract end
Goalkeepers
1	Khairul Hisyam Norihwan	(Brunei)	7 August 2004 (age 22)	Youth	2024	2025
12	Abdul Azeez Elyas	(Brunei)	9 August 1998 (age 28)	(Brunei) Admirul Red Star	2024	2025
23	Jefri Syafiq Ishak	(Brunei)	21 May 2002 (age 24)	(Brunei) Kuala Belait	2025	2025
25	Wa'ie Haziq Wardun	(Brunei)	4 August 2005 (age 21)	Youth	2024	2025
Defenders
2	Danish Firdaus Roddy Suhardy	(Brunei)	23 January 2006 (age 20)	Youth	2024	2025
3	Marcelo Júnior de Souza Loiola	(Brazil)	25 August 1998 (age 28)	(Mongolia) Tuv Azarganuud FC (M1)	2024	2025
4	Azrin Danial Yusra	(Brunei)	11 February 2006 (age 20)	Youth	2024	2025
5	Abdul Raziq Saiful Faisal	(Brunei)		Youth	2024	2025
6	Adrian Zikry Nor Khairi	(Brunei)	9 August 2006 (age 20)	(Singapore) Woodlands Warriors (Amateur)	2024	2025
14	Martin Haddy Khallidden	(Brunei)	21 April 1998 (age 28)	(Brunei) MS ABDB	2024	2025
16	Irfan Chin Ikhwan Chin	(Brunei)	6 January 2006 (age 20)	Youth	2024	2025
	Danial Hakimi Rosmadi	(Brunei)		Youth	2024	2025
Midfielders
8	Faris Fadillah Saiful Bahari	(Brunei)		Youth	2024	2025
11	Hadi Aiman Hamizal	(Brunei)		Youth	2024	2025
15	Safwan Zawawi Sazalee	(Brunei)	8 June 2006 (age 20)	(Singapore) Woodlands Warriors (Amateur)	2024	2025
17	Abdul Muntaqim Al-Muhtadee Billah	(Brunei)	17 March 2007 (age 19)	Youth	2024	2025
18	Kenshin Uneo	(Japan)	6 April 2000 (age 26)	(Laos) Namtha United	2025	2025
19	Aqram Waqeel Bakri	(Brunei)		Youth	2024	2025
21	Matías Hernández	(Spain)	10 September 1997 (age 29)	(Spain) Salamanca (S5)	2024	2025
22	Akmal Rizal Abu Bakar	(Brunei)	11 February 2006 (age 20)	Youth	2024	2025
24	Haziq Naqiuddin Syamra	(Brunei)	25 May 2004 (age 22)	(Brunei) Kota Ranger	2024	2025
	Farrish Ballkid Karami Karamilahi	(Brunei)		Youth	2024	2025
Strikers
7	Sergio Mendigutxia	(Spain)	12 June 1993 (age 33)	(Spain) Marino de Luanco (S4)	2024	2025
9	Adrian Zizry Nor Khairi	(Brunei)	9 August 2006 (age 20)	(Singapore) Woodlands Warriors (Amateur)	2024	2025
10	Abdul Azizi Ali Rahman	(Brunei)	17 January 1987 (age 39)	(Brunei) DPMM FC	2025	2025
13	Shah Razen Said	(Brunei)	14 December 1985 (age 40)	(Brunei) Kasuka FC	2025	2025
20	Al-Kholil Sapawi	(Brunei)	18 November 2005 (age 20)	(Brunei) Panchor Murai	2025	2025
Players who left during season
10	Zarif Muzaffar Abdul Hana Rizal	(Brunei)		Youth	2024	2025
18	Razimie Ramlli	(Brunei)	6 August 1990 (age 36)	(Brunei) MS ABDB	2019	2025
20	Bakhtiyar Duyshobekov	(Kyrgyzstan)	3 June 1995 (age 31)	(Kyrgyzstan) FC Alga Bishkek (K1)	2024	2025

== Coaching staff ==
=== First-team squad ===
Position	Name	Ref.
Head Coach	(Scotland) Jamie McAllister	
Assistant Coach	(Brunei) Moksen Mohammad	
Fitness Coach	Vacant	
Goalkeeping Coach	(Brazil) Jorge Ferreira	
Team Manager	(Brunei) Ali Momin	
Assistant Manager	(Brunei) Rosmin Kamis	
Physiotherapist	(Brunei) Faisal Hashim (Brunei) Masri Tahir	
Kitman	(Brunei) Kasim Amit	

=== Second-team squad ===
Position	Name	Ref.
Head Coach	(Brunei) Helme Panjang	
Assistant Coach	(Brunei) Subhi Abdilah Bakir (Brunei) Mahdini Mohammad	
Goalkeeping Coach	(Brunei) Julaihi Domeng	
Team Manager	(Brunei) Momin Jaafar (Brunei) Saharul Nizam Tuah	
Physiotherapist	(Brunei) Noorman Abdul Rahman	
Kitman	(Brunei) Abdul Hafiz Mursadi	

== Transfers ==
=== In ===
Pre-Season transfers

Position	Player	Transferred from	Team	Ref
GK	(Brunei) Ishyra Asmin Jabidi	(Brunei) MS ABDB	First team	
DF	(Brunei) Danish Firdaus Roddy Suhardy	Youth	Promoted to first team	
DF	(Australia) Patrick Flottmann	(South Korea) Seongnam	First team	
DF	(Brunei) Nazry Aiman Azaman	(Brunei) MS ABDB	First team	
MF	(Brunei) Abdul Hariz Herman	(Brunei) MS ABDB	First team	
MF	(Brunei) Faturrahman Embran	(Brunei) Kota Ranger	First team	
MF	(Brunei) Haziq Naqiuddin Syamra	(Brunei) Kota Ranger	First team	
MF	(Brunei) Safwan Zawawi Sazalee	Youth	Promoted to first team	
MF	(Brunei) Syafiq Safiuddin Abdul Shariff	(Brunei) Indera SC	First team	
FW	(Mexico) Julio Cruz	(Mexico) Oaxaca	First team	Undisclosed
FW	(Brazil) Gabriel Gama	(Brazil) Catanduva U20	First team	Free
FW	(Portugal) Miguel Oliveira	Free agent	First team	Free

Mid-Season transfers

Position	Player	Transferred from	Team	Ref
GK	(Brunei) Arif Umar @ Abdul Azeez Elyas	Free agent	Second team	Free
GK	(Brunei) Jefri Syafiq Ishak	(Brunei) Kuala Belait	Second team	Free
DF	(Brazil) Marcelinho Junior	(Mongolia) Tuv Azarganuud	Second team	Free
DF	(Brunei) Martin Haddy Khallidden	(Brunei) MS ABDB	Second team	Free
DF	(Iceland) Damir Muminovic	(Iceland) Breiðablik	First team	Free
DF	(Brunei) Wafi Aminuddin	(Brunei) Kasuka FC	First team	Free
MF	(Kyrgyzstan) Bakhtiyar Duyshobekov	(Kyrgyzstan) FC Alga Bishkek	Second team	Free
MF	(Spain) Matías Hernández	(Spain) Salamanca	Second team	Free
MF	(Japan) Kenshin Uneo	(Laos) Namtha United	Second team	Free
MF	(Brunei) Na'im Tarif	(Brunei) MS PPDB	First team	
FW	(Brunei) Abdul Azizi Ali Rahman	Unattached	Second team	Free
FW	(Brunei) Al-Kholil Sapawi	(Brunei) Panchor Murai	Second team	Free
FW	(Brunei) Hariz Danial Khallidden	(Brunei) MS ABDB	First team	Free
FW	(Latvia) Dāvis Ikaunieks	(Lithuania) FA Šiauliai	First team	Free
FW	(Spain) Sergio Mendigutxia	(Spain) Marino de Luanco	Second team	Free
FW	(Brunei) Shah Razen Said	(Brunei) Kasuka FC	Second team	Free

=== Out ===
Pre-Season transfers

Position	Player	Transferred To	Team	Ref
GK	(Brunei) Wardun Yussof	(Brunei) Kasuka	First team	Free
DF	(Brunei) Hirzi Zulfaqar Mahzan	(Brunei) Kasuka	First team	Free
DF	(Brunei) Wafi Aminuddin	(Brunei) Kasuka	First team	Free
DF	(Spain) Ángel Martínez	(Spain) Linares Deportivo	First team	Free
DF	(Brunei) Helmi Zambin	(Brunei) Kasuka	First team	Free
DF	(Brunei) Fakharrazi Hassan	Retired	First team	Free
MF	(Brunei) Hendra Azam Idris	(Brunei) Indera SC	First team	Free
MF	(Brunei) Eddy Shahrol Omar	(Brunei) Street United	First team	Free
MF	(Brunei) Syafiq Hilmi Shahrom	(Brunei) Kasuka	First team	Free
FW	(Brunei) Razimie Ramlli	(Brunei) DPMM II	Reassigned to second team	Free
FW	(Brunei) Abdul Azizi Ali Rahman	Retired	First team	Free
FW	(Belarus) Andrey Varankow	(Belarus) FC DMedia	First team	Free

Mid-Season transfers

Position	Player	Transferred To	Team	Ref
DF	(Brunei) Danish Firdaus Roddy Suhardy	(Brunei) DPMM II	Reassigned to second team	
DF	(Australia) Patrick Flottmann		First team	
MF	(Kyrgyzstan) Bakhtiyar Duyshobekov	(Kyrgyzstan) FC Neftchi Kochkor-Ata	Second team	
DF	(Brunei) Haziq Naqiuddin Syamra	(Brunei) DPMM II	Reassigned to second team	
DF	(Brunei) Safwan Zawawi Sazalee	(Brunei) DPMM II	Reassigned to second team	
MF	(Brunei) Zarif Muzaffar Abdulhana Rizal		Second team	
FW	(Mexico) Julio Cruz		First team	
FW	(Brunei) Razimie Ramlli	(Brunei) MS ABDB	Second team	

=== Extension / retained ===
Position	Player	Team	Ref
GK	(North Macedonia) Kristijan Naumovski	First team	
MF	(Afghanistan) Farshad Noor	First team	

=== Trial ===
Position	Player	Club	Ref
DF	(Moldova) Victor Mudrac	(Moldova) FC Petrocub Hîncești	
MF	(Brazil) Sávio Roberto	(Iran) Esteghlal Khuzestan	
MF	(Russia) Alim Zumakulov	(Chinese Taipei) Taiwan Steel	
DF	(Democratic Republic of the Congo) Rocky Bushiri	(Scotland) Hibernian	
DF	(Republic of Ireland) Ciaran Clark	Free agent	
FW	(Wales) Christian Doidge	(England) Forest Green Rovers	
FW	(Bermuda) Nahki Wells	(England) Bristol City	
FW	(Ghana) Augustine Okrah	(Ghana) Bechem United	

== Friendlies ==
=== Pre-season ===
Win Draw Loss

6 April 2024	(Brunei) DPMM	4–1	MS ABDB (Brunei)	Jerudong
21:15 UTC+8				Stadium: Jerudong Park Mini Stadium

20 April 2024	(Brunei) DPMM	3–1	Guangxi Pingguo Haliao (China)	Bandar Seri Begawan
20:00 UTC+8	Gabriel 5'; Azwan A. 46'; Oliveira 64'	Report	Wang Jingbin 83'	Stadium: Hassanal Bolkiah National Stadium; Referee: Abdul Hakim Haidi

26 April 2024 Selangor Asia Challenge	(Malaysia) Selangor	4–0	DPMM (Brunei)	Petaling Jaya, Malaysia
21:00 UTC+8	Al-Rawabdeh 15', 57'; Fortes 30', 68'			Stadium: MBPJ Stadium

28 April 2024 Selangor Asia Challenge	(Brunei) DPMM	3–3	Balestier Khalsa (Singapore)	Petaling Jaya, Malaysia
17:00 UTC+8	Hakeme 28', 35'; Azwan A. 45'	Report	Sugita 6'; Tanaka 19'; Kozar 64'	Stadium: MBPJ Stadium

Imagine Football Fiesta

On 30 April, an exhibition game was held in conjunction with the 40th National Day of Brunei between DPMM and former English Premier League players, organised by imagine and Oceanus Media Global.

DPMM FC fielded a mixture of current local players and their backroom management staff, including Ali Momin, one of the club's founding members. The EPL Legends also featured two new youthful DPMM signings, one of which was Safwan Zawawi Sazalee who converted a penalty against his current club.

30 April 2024
20:00 UTC+8

(Brunei) DPMM Selection	4–2	EPL Legends
Rosmin 26'; Faturrahman 33'; Farhan 45'; Safiuddin 54'	Report	Pennant 10'; Safwan 47' (pen.)

Hassanal Bolkiah National Stadium, Bandar Seri Begawan
Referee: Mou'azhzham Zamakhsyarie Marsidi

DPMM:
GK	12	Haimie Abdullah Nyaring	(substituted off) 30'
DF	24	Danish Firdaus Roddy Suhardy	(substituted off) 41'
DF	13	Hanif Hamir
DF	21	Nazry Aiman Azaman	(substituted off) 68'
MF	4	Hanif Farhan Azman
MF	6	Azwan Saleh	(substituted off) 48'
MF	5	Ali Momin (c)	(substituted off) 19'
MF	20	Rosmin Kamis	(substituted off) 48'
MF	17	Abdul Hariz Herman	(substituted off) 68'
MF	8	Faturrahman Embran	(substituted off) 41'
FW	22	Nazirrudin Ismail	(substituted off) 55'
Substitutes:
GK	1	Faisal Hashim	(substituted on) 57'
GK	25	Ishyra Asmin Jabidi	(substituted on) 30'	(yellow card) 47'	(substituted off) 57'
DF	44	Saharul Nizam Tuah	(substituted on) 41'
MF	2	Syafiq Safiuddin Abdul Shariff	(substituted on) 19'
MF	7	Azwan Ali Rahman	(substituted on) 68'
MF	9	Subhi Abdilah Bakir	(substituted on) 41'
MF	17	Hakeme Yazid Said	(substituted on) 68'	(yellow card) 74'
MF	23	Helme Panjang	(substituted on) 48'
FW	19	Kasim Amit	(substituted on) 48'
Coach:
(Portugal) Rui Capela

EPL Legends:
GK	1	Paul Rachubka
DF	24	Wes Brown
DF	66	Phil Babb	(substituted off) 57'
DF	22	Erik Nevland
DF	21	Emile Heskey	(substituted off) 41'
MF	20	Eric Djemba-Djemba	(substituted off) 57'
MF	11	Vladimir Smicer	(substituted off) 41'
MF	25	David Thompson	(substituted off) 41'	(substituted on) 70'
FW	37	Danny Webber	(substituted off) 78'
FW	16	Jermaine Pennant	(substituted off) 70'
FW	9	Dimitar Berbatov (c)
Substitutes:
DF	4	David May	(substituted on) 41'
MF	10	Luis Garcia	(substituted on) 63'
MF	15	Patrik Berger
MF	18	John Durnin	(substituted on) 57'
MF	19	Haziq Naqiuddin Syamra	(substituted on) 41'
MF	29	Ben Thornley	(substituted on) 57'
MF	99	Safwan Zawawi Sazalee	(substituted on) 41'	(substituted off) 63'

=== Mid-season ===
4 June 2024	(Brunei) DPMM	3–0	Kasuka (Brunei)	Bandar Seri Begawan
21:15 UTC+8				Stadium: Hassanal Bolkiah National Stadium

7 August 2024	(Brunei) DPMM II	2–0	LF FT (Brunei)	Jerudong
20:00 UTC+8	Abdul Muntaqim			Stadium: Jerudong Park Mini Stadium

14 August 2024	(Brunei) DPMM II	2–1	Indera (Brunei)	Jerudong
20:15 UTC+8				Stadium: Jerudong Park Mini Stadium

18 September 2024	(Brunei) DPMM II	8–0	Brunei U-20	Jerudong
20:15 UTC+8	Mendigutxia; Abdul Muntaqim; Razimie; Haziq			Stadium: Jerudong Park Mini Stadium

25 September 2024	(Brunei) DPMM II	6–0	X Team (Brunei)	Jerudong
20:15 UTC+8				Stadium: Jerudong Park Mini Stadium

4 January 2025	(Brunei) DPMM	1–1	Kuching City (Malaysia)	Bandar Seri Begawan
20:15 UTC+8	Muminovic 5'		Okwuosa 70'	Stadium: Hassanal Bolkiah National Stadium

5 January 2025	(Brunei) DPMM II	3–3	Kuching City (Malaysia)	Jerudong
16:00 UTC+8	Uneo; Mendigutxia			Stadium: Jerudong Park Mini Stadium

== Appearances and goals ==
=== First-team squad ===
As of 27 May 2025

No.	Pos.	Player	SGPL		Singapore Cup		Total	
No.	Pos.	Player	Apps.	Goals	Apps.	Goals	Apps.	Goals
1	GK	(North Macedonia) Kristijan Naumovski	24	0	4	0	28	0
2	MF	(Brunei) Syafiq Safiuddin Abdul Shariff	16+6	0	1+1	0	24	0
3	DF	(Brunei) Abdul Mu'iz Sisa	2+12	0	0	0	14	0
4	MF	(Brunei) Hanif Farhan Azman	2+18	0	0+4	0	24	0
5	DF	(Iceland) Damir Muminovic	14	0	6	0	20	0
6	MF	(Brunei) Azwan Saleh	4+13	1	0+2	0	19	1
7	MF	(Brunei) Azwan Ali Rahman	26+1	4	6	1	33	5
8	MF	(Brunei) Faturrahman Embran	0+4	0	0+2	0	6	0
9	FW	(Portugal) Miguel Oliveira	29	10	6	1	35	11
10	MF	(Afghanistan) (Netherlands) Farshad Noor	25	0	3	0	28	0
11	MF	(Brunei) Najib Tarif	29+3	0	4+1	0	37	0
12	GK	(Brunei) Haimie Abdullah Nyaring	7	0	2	0	9	0
13	DF	(Brunei) Hanif Hamir	7+12	0	0	0	19	0
14	MF	(Brunei) Na'im Tarif	0	0	0	0	0	0
15	FW	(Brunei) Hariz Danial Khallidden	2+9	0	0+5	0	16	0
16	MF	(Brunei) Abdul Hariz Herman	14+8	0	5+1	0	28	0
17	FW	(Brunei) Hakeme Yazid Said	20+2	7	0	0	22	7
18	FW	(Latvia) Dāvis Ikaunieks	14	14	6	4	20	18
19	MF	(Brunei) Nurikhwan Othman	27+4	1	4	1	35	2
20	FW	(Brazil) Gabriel Gama	28+1	4	6	1	35	5
21	DF	(Brunei) Nazry Aiman Azaman	11+11	0	3+1	1	26	1
22	MF	(Brunei) Nazirrudin Ismail	10+16	4	6	0	32	4
23	DF	(Brunei) Yura Indera Putera Yunos	24+1	1	4+1	0	30	1
24	DF	(Brunei) Wafi Aminuddin	0+1	0	0	0	1	0
25	GK	(Brunei) Ishyra Asmin Jabidi	0	0	0	0	0	0
Players who have played this season but had left the club or on loan to other club
5	DF	(Australia) Patrick Flottmann	2	0	0	0	2	0
14	MF	(Brunei) Safwan Zawawi Sazalee	0	0	0	0	0	0
15	MF	(Brunei) Haziq Naqiuddin Syamra	0	0	0	0	0	0
18	FW	(Mexico) Julio Cruz	14	6	0	0	14	6
24	DF	(Brunei) Danish Firdaus Roddy Suhardy	0	0	0	0	0	0

=== Second-team squad ===
As of 19 May 2025

No.	Pos.	Player	BSL		FA Cup		Total	
No.	Pos.	Player	Apps.	Goals	Apps.	Goals	Apps.	Goals
1	GK	(Brunei) Khairul Hisyam Norihwan	1+1	0	0+1	0	3	0
2	DF	(Brunei) Danish Firdaus Roddy Suhardy	4	0	1+1	0	6	0
3	DF	(Brazil) Marcelo Junior	13	4	7	2	20	6
4	DF	(Brunei) Azrin Danial Yusra	11+1	1	6+1	0	19	1
5	DF	(Brunei) Abdul Raziq Saiful Faisal	0+3	0	0+2	0	5	0
6	DF	(Brunei) Adrian Zikry Nor Khairi	2+1	1	0+1	0	4	1
7	FW	(Spain) Sergio Mendigutxia	13	34	7	6	20	40
8	MF	(Brunei) Faris Fadillah Saiful Bahari	4+6	0	5+1	0	16	0
9	FW	(Brunei) Adrian Zizry Nor Khairi	0+2	0	0+1	0	3	0
10	FW	(Brunei) Abdul Azizi Ali Rahman	3+1	1	6+1	2	11	3
11	MF	(Brunei) Hadi Aiman Hamizal	4+5	0	1+5	0	15	0
12	GK	(Brunei) Abdul Azeez Elyas	9	0	2	0	11	0
13	FW	(Brunei) Shah Razen Said	3	0	0+1	3	4	3
14	DF	(Brunei) Martin Haddy Khallidden	13	0	7	0	20	0
15	MF	(Brunei) Safwan Zawawi Sazalee	0+2	0	3+4	1	9	1
16	DF	(Brunei) Irfan Abdullah Ikhwan Chin	5+2	0	0+1	0	8	0
17	MF	(Brunei) Abdul Muntaqim	12	3	1	0	13	3
18	MF	(Japan) Kenshin Uneo	3	1	6+1	3	10	4
19	MF	(Brunei) Aqram Waqeel Bakri	2+8	1	4+1	0	15	1
20	FW	(Brunei) Al-Kholil Sapawi	0+4	1	3+3	3	10	4
21	MF	(Spain) Matías Hernández	13	7	7	4	20	11
22	DF	(Brunei) Akmal Rizal Abu Bakar	2+3	2	1	0	6	2
23	GK	(Brunei) Jefri Syafiq Ishak	3	0	5	0	8	0
24	MF	(Brunei) Haziq Naqiuddin Syamra	2+2	1	6+1	3	11	4
25	GK	(Brunei) Wa'ie Haziq Wardun	0+1	0	0	0	1	0
Players who have played this season but had left the club or on loan to other club
2	DF	(Brunei) Danial Hakimi Rosmadi	0+2	0	0	0	2	0
10	MF	(Brunei) Zarif Muzaffar Abdulhana Rizal	7+2	1	0	0	9	1
18	FW	(Brunei) Razimie Ramlli	5	2	0	0	5	2
20	MF	(Kyrgyzstan) Bakhtiyar Duyshobekov	9	2	0	0	9	2
24	DF	(Brunei) Farrish Ballkid Karamilahi	0+3	0	0	0	3	0

== Competitions ==
=== Overview ===
First-team

Competition	First match	Last match	Starting round	Final position	Record							
Competition	First match	Last match	Starting round	Final position	Pld	W	D	L	GF	GA	GD	Win %
Singapore Premier League	11 May 2024	24 May 2025	Matchday 1	5th	32	12	8	12	54	61	−7	37.50
Singapore Cup	1 February 2025	27 May 2025	Group stage	Semi-finals	6	2	1	3	9	12	−3	33.33
Total					38	14	9	15	63	73	−10	36.84

Source: Competitions

Second team

Competition	First match	Last match	Starting round	Final position	Record							
Competition	First match	Last match	Starting round	Final position	Pld	W	D	L	GF	GA	GD	Win %
Brunei Super League	1 September 2024	2 February 2025	Matchday 1	2nd	13	12	0	1	62	10	+52	92.31
Brunei FA Cup	19 February 2025	18 May 2025	Round of 16	Winners	7	6	1	0	27	1	+26	85.71
Total					20	18	1	1	89	11	+78	90.00

Source: Competitions

=== Singapore Premier League ===
Win Draw Loss

11 May 2024 1	Young Lions (Singapore)	1–2	(Brunei) DPMM	Jalan Besar
18:00	Farhan 20'; Amir (yellow card) 75'; Pinto (yellow card) 90+4'	Report	Oliveira 22'; Yura 38'; Noor (yellow card) 84'	Stadium: Jalan Besar Stadium; Referee: Clarence Leow; Man of the Match: (Portugal) Miguel Oliveira

25 May 2024 2	Albirex Niigata (S) (Japan)	1–4	(Brunei) DPMM	Jurong East
18:00	Otake 56' (yellow card) 34'	Report	Cruz 12'; Gabriel 18'; Oliveira 21', 60'; Safiuddin (yellow card) 29'	Stadium: Jurong East Stadium; Referee: Farhan Mohd; Man of the Match: (Portugal) Miguel Oliveira

18 June 2024 3 (Rescheduled)	DPMM (Brunei)	0–2	(Singapore) Lion City Sailors	Jalan Besar
19:45	Oliveira (yellow card) 24'; Farhan (yellow card) 80'	Report	Shawal 86'; Lestienne 90+5'; Hami (yellow card) 24'; Tan (yellow card) 56'; Hariss (yellow card) 60'	Stadium: Jalan Besar Stadium (Note: Match rescheduled and location changed due to technical issues in Hassanal Bolkiah National Stadium); Referee: Muhammad Taqi; Man of the Match: (Belgium) Maxime Lestienne

22 June 2024 4	DPMM (Brunei)	3–3	(Singapore) Geylang International	Bandar Seri Begawan
	Azwan A. 26' (yellow card) 28'; Hakeme 76' (pen.); Cruz 81'; Noor (yellow card) 37' (yellow-red card) 63'; Gama (yellow card) 70'; Oliveira (yellow card) 89'; Nurikhwan (yellow card) 90'; Naumovski (yellow card) 90+4'	Report	Naqiuddin 15'; Sakuma 22' (yellow card) 76'; Doi 30'; Shakir (yellow card) 18'	Stadium: Hassanal Bolkiah National Stadium; Referee: Farhan Mohd

29 June 2024 5	Tanjong Pagar United (Singapore)	3–2	(Brunei) DPMM	Jurong East
	Cissé 33'; Anaqi 42'; Syahadat 85'; Faizal (yellow card) 90+5'	Report	Oliveira 53' (yellow card) 90+5'; Cruz 58' (pen.)	Stadium: Jurong East Stadium; Referee: Oswind Suriya; Man of the Match: (Mali) (France) Salif Cissé

5 July 2024 6	Balestier Khalsa (Singapore)	4–2	(Brunei) DPMM	Bishan
	Amiruldin 36'; Amer Hakeem 43'; Sassi 45+2'; Ang 47'; Madhu (yellow card) 90+2'	Report	Cruz 5'; Gama 69'	Stadium: Bishan Stadium; Referee: Zulfiqar Mustaffa; Man of the Match: (Singapore) Amiruldin Asraf

13 July 2024 7	BG Tampines Rovers (Singapore)	3–0	(Brunei) DPMM	Jalan Besar
	Kopitović 29', 88'; Nurikhwan 62' (o.g.); Amirul Adli (yellow card) 73'	Report		Stadium: Jalan Besar Stadium; Referee: Jansen Foo; Man of the Match: (Montenegro) Boris Kopitović

19 July 2024 8	DPMM (Brunei)	1–1	(Singapore) Hougang United	Bandar Seri Begawan
	Nazirrudin 62'; Azwan A. (yellow card) 34'; Syafiq (yellow card) 41'; Yura (yellow card) 59'; Mu'iz (yellow card) 90+2'	Report	Plazonja 42'; Nazrul (yellow card) 25'; Salihović (yellow card) 60'; Nazhiim (yellow card) 74'; Zaiful Nizam (yellow card) 90+2'	Stadium: Hassanal Bolkiah National Stadium; Referee: Muhammad Taqi; Man of the Match: (Singapore) Kenji Syed Rusydi

27 July 2024 9	DPMM (Brunei)	1–3	(Singapore) Young Lions	Jalan Besar
	Hakeme 32' (pen.); Azwan A. (yellow card) 38'; Noor (yellow card) 85'; Mu'iz (yellow card) 90+6'	Report	Enomoto 2', 77' (yellow card) 64'; Farhan 51'; Fathullah (yellow card) 45+1'; Ryaan (yellow card) 90+1'	Stadium: Jalan Besar Stadium (Note: Match location changed due to Radio Television Brunei not able to broadcast the match); Referee: Syarqawi Buhari; Man of the Match: (Japan) Itsuki Enomoto

3 August 2024 10	Lion City Sailors (Singapore)	3–0	(Brunei) DPMM	Bishan
	Thy 20', 69'; Shawal 50'	Report	Noor (yellow card) 30'; Ikhwan (yellow card) 41'	Stadium: Bishan Stadium; Referee: Zulfiqar Mustaffa; Man of the Match: (Germany) Lennart Thy

10 August 2024 11	DPMM (Brunei)	0–0	(Japan) Albirex Niigata (S)	Bandar Seri Begawan
	Hakeme (yellow card) 53'; Azwan A. (yellow card) 84'	Report		Stadium: Hassanal Bolkiah National Stadium; Referee: Andrea Verolino

24 August 2024 12	Geylang International (Singapore)	2–4	(Brunei) DPMM	Jalan Besar
	Doi 64', 66'; Pereira (yellow card) 45+4'; Taniguchi (yellow card) 84'	Report	Oliveira 5'; Cruz 32' (yellow card) 45+4'; Hakeme 38', 62'; Hariz (yellow card) 6'	Stadium: Jalan Besar Stadium; Referee: Zulfiqar Bin Mustaffa; Man of the Match: (Brunei) Hakeme Yazid Said

31 August 2024 13	DPMM (Brunei)	1–1	(Singapore) Tanjong Pagar United	Bandar Seri Begawan
	Faisal 30' (o.g.); Yura (yellow card) 36'; Nurikhwan (yellow card) 72'	Report	Cissé 66'; Syed Akmal (yellow card) 28'	Stadium: Hassanal Bolkiah National Stadium; Referee: Jansen Foo; Man of the Match: (France) (Senegal) Salif Cissé

13 September 2024 14 (Rescheduled)	DPMM (Brunei)	2–2	(Singapore) Balestier Khalsa	Jalan Besar
	Hakeme 14'; Gabriel 42'; Noor (yellow card) 45+5'; Nazry (yellow card) 56'; Farhan (yellow card) 68'; Cruz (yellow card) 90+10'; Naumovski (yellow card) 73' (yellow-red card) 90+10'	Report	Fukashiro 33'; Sassi 90+10'; Tanaka (yellow card) 74'; Amiruldin (yellow card) 75'; Madhu (red card) 86'	Stadium: Jalan Besar Stadium (Note: Match rescheduled & location changed due to Radio Television Brunei not able to broadcast the match); Referee: Clarence Leow; Man of the Match: (Brazil) Gabriel Gama

22 September 2024 15	DPMM (Brunei)	3–2	(Singapore) BG Tampines Rovers	Bandar Seri Begawan
	Oliveira 14', 86'; Nazirrudin 85'; Haimie (yellow card) 37'	Report	Kweh 48'; Kopitović 59'	Stadium: Hassanal Bolkiah National Stadium; Referee: Zulfiqar Mustaffa; Man of the Match: (Portugal) Miguel Oliveira

27 September 2024 16	Hougang United (Singapore)	2–2	(Brunei) DPMM	Jalan Besar
	Plazonja 74'; Račić 90+5'; Salihović (yellow card) 18'; Nazhiim (yellow card) 31'; Kraljević (yellow card) 75'	Report	Cruz 12' (pen.); Salihović 15' (o.g.); Noor (yellow card) 38'; Azwan A. (yellow card) 61' (yellow-red card) 80'	Stadium: Jalan Besar Stadium; Referee: Hilmi Fuad; Man of the Match: (Croatia) Stjepan Plazonja

18 October 2024 17	DPMM (Brunei)	0–3	(Singapore) Young Lions	Bandar Seri Begawan
		Report	Enomoto 57', 68'; Fairuz 65'; Kan Kobayashi (penalty missed) 18; Raoul (yellow card) 13'	Stadium: Hassanal Bolkiah National Stadium; Referee: Farhan Mohd; Man of the Match: (Japan) Itsuki Enomoto

2 November 2024 18	Albirex Niigata (S) (Japan)	2–3	(Brunei) DPMM	Jurong East
	Shingo Nakano 45+2'; SteviaEgbus Mikuni 61'; Daniel Goh (yellow card) 78'	Report	Azwan Ali Rahman 45+9' (yellow card) 70'; Miguel Oliveira 48'; Azwan Saleh 90+5'; Nazry Aiman Azaman (yellow card) 34'; Farshad Noor (yellow card) 74'; Jamie McAllister (yellow card) 89'; Hakeme Yazid Said (yellow card) 90+4'	Stadium: Jurong East Stadium; Referee: Zulfiqar Mustaffa; Man of the Match: (Brunei) Azwan Saleh

13 January 2025 19 (Rescheduled)	DPMM (Brunei)	2–4	(Singapore) Lion City Sailors	Bandar Seri Begawan
	Azwan Ali Rahman 4'; Miguel Oliveira 57'; Yura Indera Putera Yunos (yellow card) 67'; Hariz Danial Khallidden (yellow card) 90+4'	Report	Shawal Anuar 18', 69'; Lennart Thy 30', 64'; Sergio Carmona (yellow card) 76'	Stadium: Hassanal Bolkiah National Stadium (Note: Match rescheduled due to accommodating Lion City Sailors' Shopee Cup fixture on 9 January); Referee: Andrea Verolino; Man of the Match: (Germany) Lennart Thy

18 January 2025 20	DPMM (Brunei)	0–2	(Singapore) Geylang International	Bandar Seri Begawan
	Nazirrudin Ismail (yellow card) 65'; Nazry Aiman Azaman (yellow card) 81'	Report	Tomoyuki Doi 39' (yellow card) 85'; Ryoya Taniguchi 78'; Akmal Azman (yellow card) 73'; Rudy Khairullah (yellow card) 84'	Stadium: Hassanal Bolkiah National Stadium; Referee: Ahmad A'Qashah; Man of the Match: (Japan) Tomoyuki Doi

26 January 2025 21	Tanjong Pagar United (Singapore)	3–0	(Brunei) DPMM	Jurong East
	Syahadat Masnawi 20'; Salif Cissé 80'; Izrafil Yusof 90+7'; Syed Akmal (yellow card) 54'; Matt Silva (yellow card) 90+2'	Report	Dāvis Ikaunieks (yellow card) 35'; Azwan Ali Rahman (yellow card) 44'; Miguel Oliveira (yellow card) 60'; Nur Ikhwan Othman (yellow card) 87'	Stadium: Jurong East Stadium; Referee: Clarence Leow

7 February 2025 22	DPMM (Brunei)	2–3	(Singapore) Balestier Khalsa	Bandar Seri Begawan
	Dāvis Ikaunieks 29'; Hakeme Yazid Said 89'; Syafiq Safiuddin Abdul Shariff (yellow card) 26'; Yura Indera Putera Yunos (yellow card) 86'; Najib Tarif (yellow card) 90+3'	Report	Kodai Tanaka 49'; Anton Fase 69'; Riku Fukashiro 90+5'; Hafiz Ahmad (yellow card) 74'	Stadium: Hassanal Bolkiah National Stadium; Referee: Himi Fuad; Man of the Match: (Japan) Riku Fukashiro

23 February 2025 23	BG Tampines Rovers (Singapore)	1–0	(Brunei) DPMM	Jalan Besar
	Damir Muminovic 61' (o.g.); Kyoga Nakamura (yellow card) 90+9'	Report	Abdul Hariz Herman (yellow card) 24'; Gabriel Gama (yellow card) 51'; Miguel Oliveira (yellow card) 81'	Stadium: Jalan Besar Stadium; Referee: Clarence Leow; Man of the Match: (Serbia) Miloš Zlatković

26 February 2025 24	DPMM (Brunei)	2–1	(Singapore) Hougang United	Jalan Besar
	Dāvis Ikaunieks 20', 60' (pen.); Hanif Farhan Azman (red card) 82'; Nazirrudin Ismail (yellow card) 85' (yellow-red card) 90+4'	Report	Farhan Zulkifli 89' (pen.); Dejan Račić (penalty missed) 82; Zulfahmi Arifin (red card) 40'	Stadium: Jalan Besar Stadium (Note: Match rescheduled and location changed due to broadcasting issues in Hassanal Bolkiah National Stadium); Referee: Oswind Suriya; Man of the Match: (Latvia) Dāvis Ikaunieks

8 March 2025 25	Young Lions (Singapore)	1–1	(Brunei) DPMM	Jalan Besar
	Danish Qayyum 24'; Ryu Hardy Yussri (yellow card) 89'	Report	Gabriel Gama 78'; Miguel Oliveira (yellow card) 57'	Stadium: Jalan Besar Stadium; Referee: Zulfiqar Mustaffa; Man of the Match: (Japan) Jun Kobayashi

12 April 2025 26 (Rescheduled)	Lion City Sailors (Singapore)	0–0	(Brunei) DPMM	Bishan
	Rui Pires (yellow card) 89'	Report	Syafiq Safiuddin Abdul Shariff (yellow card) 61'; Gabriel Gama (yellow card) 83'	Stadium: Bishan Stadium (Note: Match rescheduled due to accommodating Lion City Sailors' AFC Champions League 2 fixture on 16 April); Referee: Clarence Leow; Man of the Match: (North Macedonia) Kristijan Naumovski

19 April 2025 27	DPMM (Brunei)	3–0	(Japan) Albirex Niigata (S)	Bandar Seri Begawan
	Dāvis Ikaunieks 34', 61' (pen.); Hakeme Yazid Said 48'; Azwan Ali Rahman (yellow card) 37'	Report	Syed Firdaus (yellow card) 45'; Arshad Shamim (yellow card) 73'	Stadium: Hassanal Bolkiah National Stadium; Referee: Syarqawi Buhari; Man of the Match: (Latvia) Dāvis Ikaunieks

29 April 2025 28 (Rescheduled)	Geylang International (Singapore)	1–3	(Brunei) DPMM	Tampines
	Vincent Bezecourt 85'; Saifullah Akbar (yellow card) 16'; Huzaifah Aziz (yellow card) 41'; Ahmad Syahir (yellow card) 83'	Report	Dāvis Ikaunieks 34', 77'; Nurikhwan Othman 69'; Farshad Noor (yellow card) 23'; Yura Indera Putera Yunos (yellow card) 67'; Gabriel Gama (yellow card) 90+6'	Stadium: Our Tampines Hub (Note: Match rescheduled and location changed to Our Tampines Hub due to General Election 2025 and potential closures of selected ActiveSG facilities, including stadiums that are typically used for SPL fixtures); Referee: Jansen Foo; Man of the Match: (Latvia) Dāvis Ikaunieks

2 May 2025 29	DPMM (Brunei)	2–1	(Singapore) Tanjong Pagar United	Bandar Seri Begawan
	Dāvis Ikaunieks 9', 29'; Abdul Hariz Herman (yellow card) 46'; Haimie (yellow card) 87'	Report	Sahil Suhaimi 81'; Syed Akmal (yellow card) 28' (yellow-red card); Faizal Roslan (yellow card) 45'	Stadium: Hassanal Bolkiah National Stadium; Referee: Jansen Foo; Man of the Match: (Latvia) Dāvis Ikaunieks

11 May 2025 30	Balestier Khalsa (Singapore)	3–4	(Brunei) DPMM	Jalan Besar
	Kodai Tanaka 34'; Madhu Mohana 42'; Anton Fase 45+3'; Jared Gallagher (yellow card) 81'	Report	Dāvis Ikaunieks 32', 63' (pen.), 81' (pen.); Azwan Ali Rahman 68'; Farshad Noor (yellow card) 19'; Yura Indera Putera Yunos (yellow card) 25'; Nazirrudin Ismail (yellow card) 90+5'	Stadium: Jalan Besar Stadium (Note: Location changed to Jalan Besar Stadium due to upgrading of Bishan Stadium for the AFC Champions League 2 Final); Referee: Muhammad Taqi; Man of the Match: (Latvia) Dāvis Ikaunieks

17 May 2025 31	DPMM (Brunei)	2–1	(Singapore) BG Tampines Rovers	Bandar Seri Begawan
	Nazirrudin Ismail 6', 33'; Azwan Ali Rahman (yellow card) 75'; Gabriel Gama (yellow card) 90+3'	Report	Seia Kunori 23'; Taufik Suparno (yellow card) 78'; Shah Shahiran (yellow card) 90'	Stadium: Hassanal Bolkiah National Stadium; Referee: Ahmad A'Qashah

24 May 2025 32	Hougang United (Singapore)	2–3	(Brunei) DPMM	Tampines
	Shodai Yokoyama 2' (yellow card) 80'; Dejan Račić 68'; Danish Irfan (yellow card) 9'; Parinya Kaochukiat (yellow card) 90+6'	Report	Dāvis Ikaunieks 18', 46'; Miguel Oliveira 78'; Hanif Hamir (yellow card) 49'; Faturrahman Embran (yellow card) 80'	Stadium: Our Tampines Hub; Referee: Jansen Foo; Man of the Match: (Latvia) Dāvis Ikaunieks

Pos	Team	Pld	W	D	L	GF	GA	GD	Pts	Qualification or relegation
1	Lion City Sailors (C)	32	22	6	4	96	32	+64	72	Qualification for Champions League Two group stage & ASEAN Club Championship (Note: Since the winners of the 2024–25 Singapore Cup, Lion City Sailors, had already qualified for the AFC Champions League Two and ASEAN Club Championship, the spot given to the Singapore Cup winners (Champions League Two) was passed to the second-placed team.)
2	BG Tampines Rovers	32	19	7	6	84	37	+47	64	Qualification for Champions League Two group stage & ASEAN Club Championship
3	Geylang International	32	15	9	8	97	64	+33	54	
4	Balestier Khalsa	32	14	6	12	84	80	+4	48	
5	DPMM (Note: Ineligible for AFC competition spots)	32	12	8	12	54	61	−7	44	Transferred to the 2025–26 Malaysia Super League post-season
6	Albirex Niigata (S)	32	13	3	16	55	71	−16	42	
7	Hougang United	32	7	10	15	61	76	−15	31	
8	Young Lions	32	7	8	17	47	89	−42	29	
9	Tanjong Pagar United	32	3	7	22	35	103	−68	16	

Updated to match(es) played on 25 May 2025. Source: Singapore Premier League
Rules for classification: 1) points; 2) goal difference; 3) number of goals scored; 4) number of wins
(C) Champions

=== Singapore Cup ===
Pos	Team	Pld	W	D	L	GF	GA	GD	Pts	Qualification
1	BG Tampines Rovers	4	3	1	0	12	4	+8	10	Semi-finals
2	DPMM	4	2	1	1	7	7	0	7	Semi-finals
3	Young Lions	4	2	0	2	11	7	+4	6	
4	Hougang United	4	2	0	2	8	10	−2	6	
5	Albirex Niigata (S)	4	0	0	4	4	14	−10	0	

Source: FAS

Win Draw Loss

1 February 2025 Group Match 1	BG Tampines Rovers (Singapore)	1–1	(Brunei) DPMM FC	Jalan Besar
	Seia Kunori 80'; Shah Shahiran (yellow card) 53'; Irfan Najeeb (yellow card) 73'; Taufik Suparno (yellow card) 74'; Syazwan Buhari (yellow card) 89'	Report	Nazry Aiman Azaman 90+5'; Farshad Noor (yellow card) 78'	Stadium: Jalan Besar Stadium; Referee: Muhammad Taqi

15 February 2025 Group Match 2	Young Lions (Singapore)	0–2	(Brunei) DPMM FC	Jalan Besar
	Aizil Yazid (red card) 90+5'	Report	Dāvis Ikaunieks 8' (pen.); Miguel Oliveira 71'; Nazirrudin Ismail (yellow card) 15'; Kristijan Naumovski (yellow card) 35'; Najib Tarif (yellow card) 63'	Stadium: Jalan Besar Stadium; Referee: Ahmad A'Qashah

3 March 2025 Group Match 3	DPMM FC (Brunei)	3–1	(Japan) Albriex Niigata (S)	Jalan Besar
	Dāvis Ikaunieks 30', 88'; Nurikhwan Othman 72'; Miguel Oliveira (yellow card) 74'	Report	Shingo Nakano 80'; Junki Kenn Yoshimura (yellow card) 40'	Stadium: Jalan Besar Stadium; Referee: Jansen Foo

15 March 2025 Group Match 4	DPMM FC (Brunei)	1–5	(Singapore) Hougang United	Jalan Besar
	Dāvis Ikaunieks 51'; Jamie McAllister (yellow card) 67'; Najib Tarif (yellow card) 70'; Nazry Aiman Azaman (yellow card) 73'; Damir Muminovic (yellow card) 77'; Azwan Ali Rahman (yellow card) 90+5'	Report	Daniel Alemão 21'; Shodai Yokoyama 38'; Shahdan Sulaiman 70'; Dejan Račić 81'; Stjepan Plazonja 90+5'; Ismail Salihović (yellow card) 90+1'	Stadium: Jalan Besar Stadium; Referee: Oswind Suriya

21 May 2025 Semi Final Leg 1 (Rescheduled)	DPMM FC (Brunei)	2–3	(Singapore) Lion City Sailors	Jalan Besar
	Azwan Ali Rahman 8'; Gabriel Gama 57'	Report	Maxime Lestienne 45'; Toni Datković 66'; Bailey Wright 70'	Stadium: Jalan Besar Stadium; Referee: Zulfiqar Mustaffa

27 May 2025 Semi Final Leg 2	Lion City Sailors (Singapore)	2–0 (5–2 agg.)	(Brunei) DPMM FC	Bishan
	Diogo Costa 33'; Toni Datković 60'	Report	Gabriel Gama (yellow card) 31'; Abdul Hariz Herman (yellow card) 7'; Damir Muminovic (yellow card) 58'; Nur Ikhwan Othman (yellow card) 58'	Stadium: Bishan Stadium; Referee: Jansen Foo

=== Brunei Super League ===
Pos	Team	Pld	W	D	L	GF	GA	GD	Pts	
1	Kasuka (C)	13	12	1	0	93	8	+85	37	Qualification for the AFC Challenge League qualifying play-offs and 2025–26 ASEAN Club Championship qualifying play-offs
2	DPMM II	13	12	0	1	62	10	+52	36	
3	Indera	13	10	2	1	63	8	+55	32	
4	Kota Ranger	13	9	0	4	36	24	+12	27	
5	MS PPDB	13	8	1	4	31	17	+14	25	

Source: FABD
Rules for classification: 1) Points; 2) Goal difference; 3) Goals scored; 4) Head-to-head result; 5) Head-to-head goal difference; 6) Head-to-head goals scored.
(C) Champions

Win Draw Loss

1 September 2024 1	DPMM II	2–1	MS ABDB	Jerudong
16:00	Mendigutxia 69', 73'; Irfan (yellow card) 22'; Hernandez (yellow card) 25'; Zarif (yellow card) 90+4'	Report	Hariz Danial 44'; Safarudin (red card) 25'; Rahimin (yellow card) 42'	Stadium: Jerudong Park Mini Stadium; Attendance: 200; Referee: Adib Suimi

19 October 2024 4	DPMM II	6–1	AKSE Bersatu	Jerudong
20:15	Mendigutxia 25', 42', 45+3', 60', 74'; Razimie 52' (yellow card) 31'	Report	Zainul Ariffin 83'	Stadium: Jerudong Park Mini Stadium; Referee: Rozyman Aidit Ibrahim

22 October 2024 3 (rescheduled)	Indera	0–2	DPMM II	Berakas
20:15			Mendigutxia 9', 65'; Duyshobekov (yellow card) 74'; Aqram (yellow card) 85'	Stadium: Hassanal Bolkiah National Stadium; Referee: Adib Suimi

25 October 2024 5	BSRC	1–5	DPMM II	Panaga
20:15	Mirza 27'	Report	Zarif Muzaffar 8'; Mendigutxia 15', 35', 48'; Akmal Rizal 90+2'	Stadium: BSRC Football Field; Referee: Noorhasni Omar

8 November 2024 6	DPMM II	12–1	Lun Bawang	Jerudong
20:15	Hernández 6', 89'; Mendigutxia 12', 43', 45', 45+2', 71'; Zikry 19'; Duyshobekov 28'; Razimie 30'; Marcelo Júnior 79'; Azrin 86'; Abdul Muntaqim (yellow card) 70'		Abdul Halim 38'; Firdaus (yellow card) 88'; Aderean (yellow card) 90+6'	Stadium: Jerudong Park Mini Stadium; Referee: Ali Faisal Rosli

24 November 2024 7	Wijaya	0–7	DPMM II	Berakas
15:45	Aman (yellow card) 38'; Danish Danial (yellow card) 48'		Hernández 4'; Mendigutxia 13', 65', 78'; Marcelo Júnior 23'; Abdul Muntaqim 56', 73'; Danial Hakimi (yellow card) 82'	Stadium: Hassanal Bolkiah National Stadium; Attendance: 700; Referee: Faisal Ali

1 December 2024 8	DPMM II	4–2	KB	Jerudong
20:15	Mendigutxia 29', 72'; Duyshobekov 38'; Abdul Muntaqim 90+4' (pen.)		Azizul Syafiee 59'; Haikal 78'; Syazwan (yellow card) 16'	Stadium: Jerudong Park Mini Stadium; Attendance: 150; Referee: Azrul Ariffin Matussin

4 December 2024 2 (rescheduled)	MS PPDB	0–2	DPMM II	Tungku
15:45			Marcelo 62' (yellow card) 50'; Mendigutxia 85'; Irfan Chin (yellow card) 90+4'	Stadium: Hassanal Bolkiah Mini Stadium, Police HQ; Attendance: 200; Referee: Adib Suimi

7 December 2024 9	Rimba Star	0–1	DPMM II	Berakas
20:15			Mendigutxia 11'	Stadium: Hassanal Bolkiah National Stadium

11 January 2025 10	DPMM II	8–0	Panchor Murai	Jerudong
20:15	Hernández 5'; Uneo 22'; Mendigutxia 34', 52', 65', 73'; Marcelo 57'; Akram 88'		Dinie (yellow card) 4'; Nazrul (yellow card) 58'	Stadium: Jerudong Park Mini Stadium; Referee: Rozyman Aidit Ibrahim

19 January 2025 11	Jerudong	0–5	DPMM II	Tutong
16:00	Elisa (yellow card) 32'; Yansen (yellow card) 62'; Khairol Nazrin (yellow card) 83'	Report	Hernández 39', 80'; Al-Kholil 48'; Mendigutxia 62' (yellow card) 59'; Akmal Rizal 74'; Abdul Raziq (yellow card) 90'	Stadium: Tutong Sports Complex; Referee: Abdul Hakim Haidi

28 January 2025 12 (rescheduled)	DPMM II	6–1	Kota Ranger	Jerudong
20:15	Mendigutxia 14', 17', 25', 84' (yellow card) 75'; Abdul Azizi (yellow card) 36' (goal) 44'; Azrin (yellow card) 42'; Danish Firdaus (yellow card) 45+2'; Haziq 58'		Hazmi 43' (pen.); Syazwan (yellow card) 38'; Qusyairi (yellow card) 39'; Amirul Zafrey (yellow card) 66'	Stadium: Jerudong Park Mini Stadium; Referee: Nazhiim Suhaili

2 February 2025 13	DPMM II	2–3	Kasuka	Jerudong
20:15	Mendigutxia 21'; Hernández 90+1'; Azizi (yellow card) 25'; Martin (yellow card) 67'		Willian 19', 31' (pen.), 76'; Abbey (yellow card) 37'; Adi (yellow card) 83'	Stadium: Jerudong Park Mini Stadium; Attendance: 250; Referee: Abdul Hakim Haidi

=== Brunei FA Cup ===
Pos	Team	Pld	W	D	L	GF	GA	GD	Pts	Qualification or relegation
1	DPMM FC II	2	2	0	0	13	0	+13	6	Qualification to knockout stage
2	MS ABDB	2	1	0	1	7	1	+6	3	Qualification to knockout stage
3	PKT FT	2	0	0	2	0	19	−19	0	

Source: FABD

19 February 2025 Group Match 1	DPMM II	1–0	ABDB	Jerudong
20:15	Marcelo 90'			Stadium: Jerudong Park Mini Stadium

6 April 2025 Group Match 2 (rescheduled)	PKT	0–12	DPMM II	Jerudong
16:00		Report	Azizi 4'; Kholil 9', 35'; Mendi 25', 45'; Uneo 50', 79'; Shah Razen 58', 78', 82'; Hernández 87', 88'	Stadium: Jerudong Park Mini Stadium; Attendance: 150; Referee: Noorhasni Omar

25 April 2025 Quarter-final 1st leg	DPMM II	6–1	KB FC	Bandar Seri Begawan
20:15	Mendi 12', 90+2'; Hernández 45+1'; Haziq 53'; Kholil 60'; Uneo 90'	Report	Danish Bazli 90+3'	Stadium: Track and Field Sports Complex; Referee: Azrul Ariffin Metussin

29 April 2025 Quarter-final 2nd leg	KB FC	0–5	DPMM II	Bandar Seri Begawan
20:15			Marcelo 3'; Mendi 17'; Safwan 33'; Haziq 80'; Azizi 88'	Stadium: Track and Field Sports Complex; Referee: Adib Suimi

7 May 2025 Semi-final 1st leg	Kasuka	0–0	DPMM II	Bandar Seri Begawan
20:15				Stadium: Hassanal Bolkiah National Stadium

11 May 2025 Semi-final 2nd leg	DPMM II	2–0	Kasuka	Bandar Seri Begawan
20:15	Mendi 1'; Haziq 36'			Stadium: Hassanal Bolkiah National Stadium

18 May 2025 Final	DPMM II	1–0	Indera	Bandar Seri Begawan
20:15	Hernández 73'			Stadium: Hassanal Bolkiah National Stadium; Referee: Rozyman Aidit Ibrahim
