= SCFC =

SCFC may refer to:

- Salford City F.C., an English football team
- Salisbury City F.C., an English football team
- Stalybridge Celtic F.C., an English football team
- Stockport County F.C., an English football team
- Stoke City F.C., an English football team
- Swansea City A.F.C., a Welsh football team
- São Carlos F.C., a Brazilian football team
