= Gabriel Gama =

Brazilian footballer

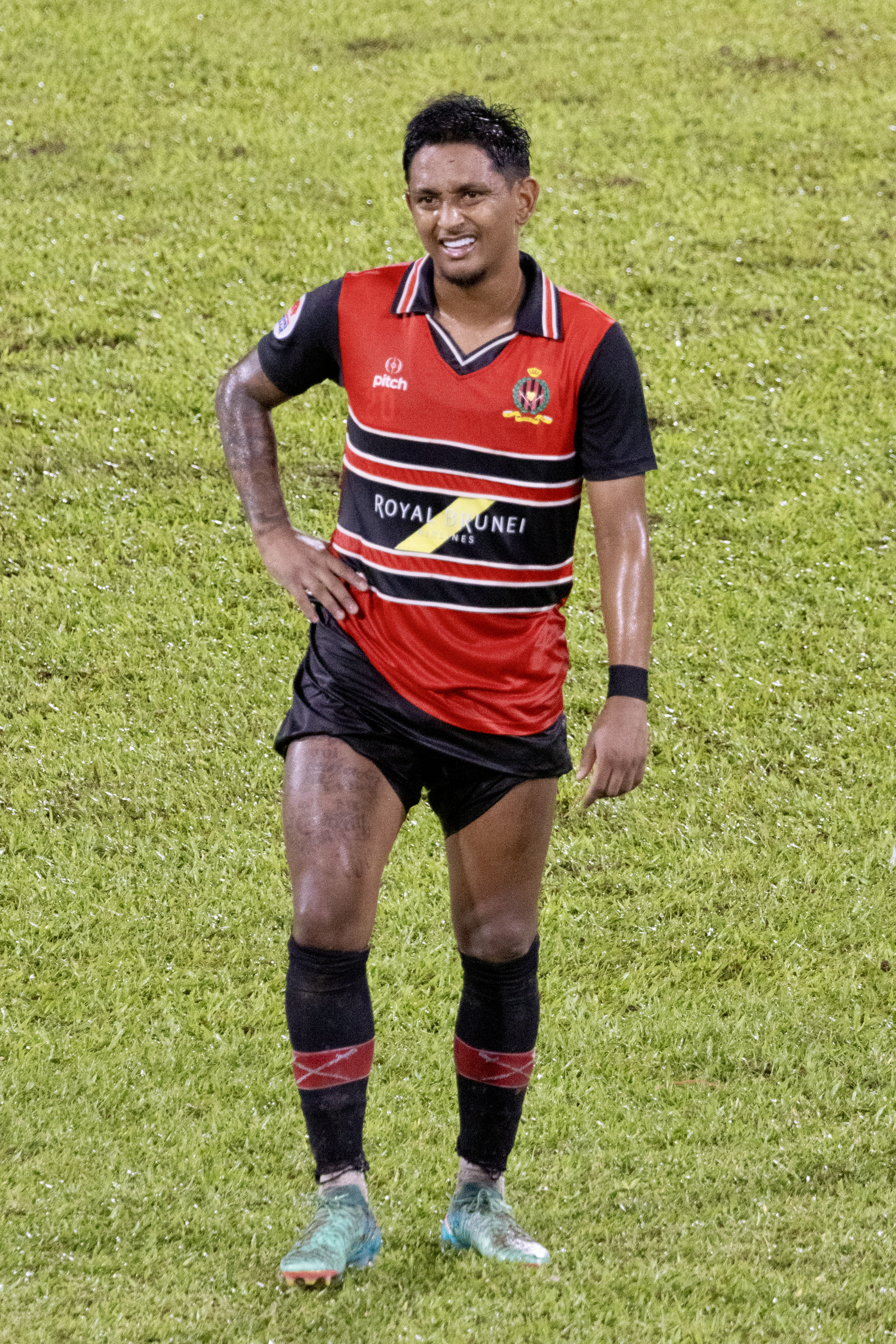
- Gama with DPMM in 2025

Personal information
- Full name: Gabriel Gama da Silva
- Date of birth: 14 May 2003 (age 23)
- Place of birth: Fortaleza, Brazil
- Height: 1.75 m (5 ft 9 in)
- Positions: Attacking midfielder; winger

Team information
- Current team: Botoșani
- Number: 77

Youth career
- 2021: Maritimo Porto Alegre
- 2021–2022: Cruzeiro
- 2022: GD São-Carlense
- 2023: Santo André
- 2024: Catanduva

Senior career*
Years	Team	Apps	(Gls)
2022	GD São-Carlense	1	(0)
2024–2025	DPMM	29	(4)
2025–2026	Mesaimeer	9	(1)
2026–	Botoșani	7	(1)
- * Club domestic league appearances and goals as of 23 October 2026

Gabriel Gama da Silva (born 14 May 2003) is a Brazilian professional footballer who plays as an attacking midfielder or a winger for Liga I club Botoșani.

== Career ==
=== Early career ===
Gama was part of the youth system of several clubs in south Brazil namely Cruzeiro, GD São-Carlense, Santo André and Catanduva.

=== DPMM ===
In March 2024, Gama was signed by DPMM, a Bruneian professional football team that were playing in the Singapore Premier League. He made his professional debut on 11 May against Young Lions as a starter in the first league game of the season where his team prevailed with a 1–2 result. In the following fixture on 25 May against Albirex Niigata (S), he opened his goalscoring account with a bicycle kick in the 18th minute to help the Bruneian side clinch a 1–4 away victory. Gama ended his spell in Brunei with five goals in 35 total appearances for the club.

=== Mesaimeer ===
Gama signed for Qatari side Mesaimeer SC and debuted in a 2–2 draw against Qatar SC in the QSL Cup on 28 October 2025. On 4 November, he made his Qatari Second Division debut and scored in a 1–2 defeat to Lusail SC.

=== Botosani ===
In June 2026, Gama completed a transfer to FC Botoșani of Romania.

== Career statistics ==
As of 23 October 2026

Club	Season	League			National cup (Note: Includes Singapore Cup, QSL Cup, Cupa României)		Continental		Other		Total	
Club	Season	Division	Apps	Goals	Apps	Goals	Apps	Goals	Apps	Goals	Apps	Goals
GD São-Carlense	2024–25	Campeonato Paulista Segunda Divisão	1	0	—		—		—		1	0
DPMM	2024–25	Singapore Premier League	29	4	6	1	—		—		35	5
Mesaimeer	2025–26	Qatari Second Division	9	1	4	4	—		1 (Note: Appearance in Emir Cup)	0	14	5
Botoșani	2026–27	Liga I	7	1	2	1	—		—		9	2
Career total			46	6	12	6	—		1	0	59	12
