= Nazry Aiman Azaman =

Bruneian footballer

Nazry Aiman
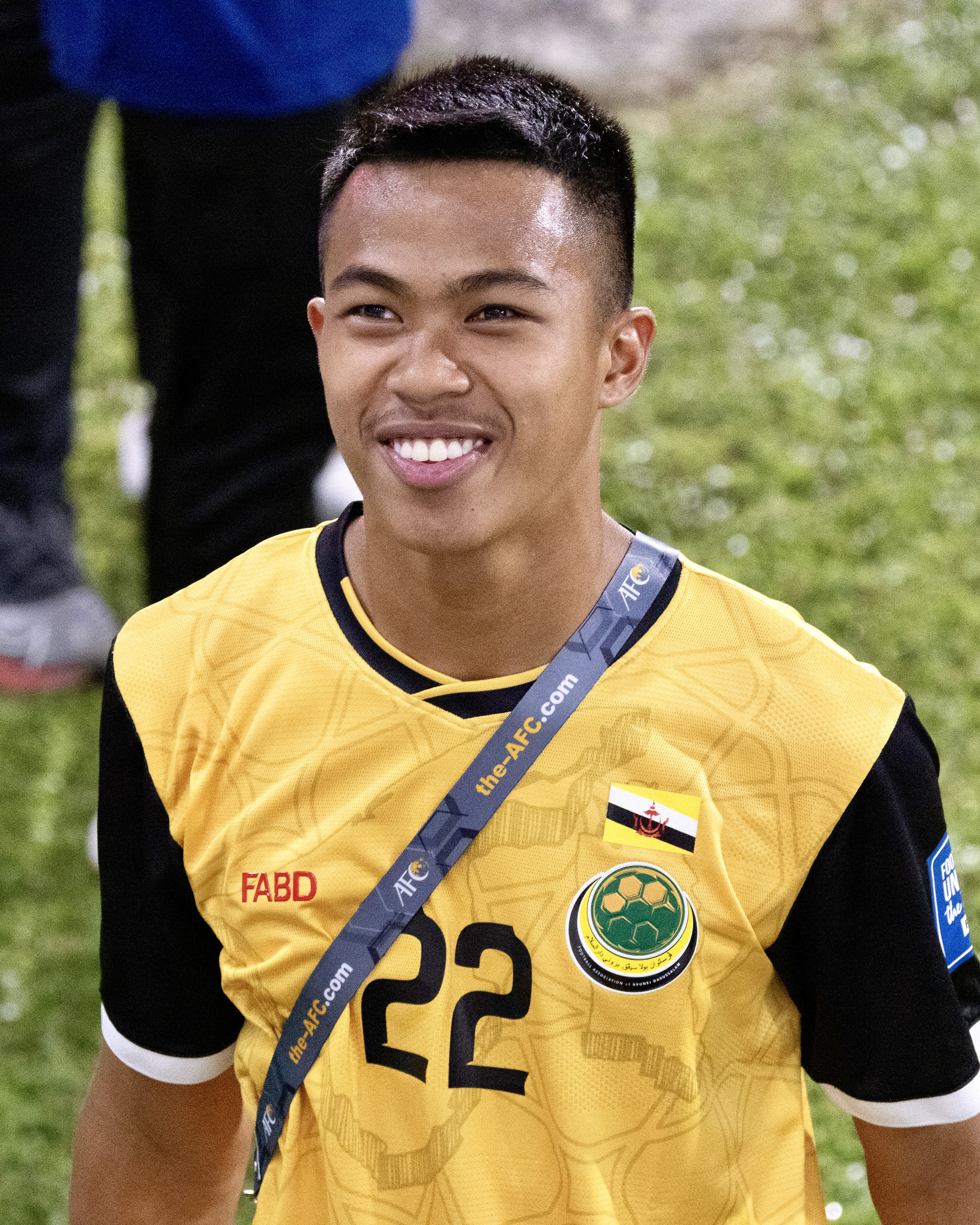
- Nazry with Brunei in 2023

Personal information
- Full name: Mohammad Nazry Aiman bin Azaman
- Date of birth: 1 July 2004 (age 22)
- Place of birth: Brunei
- Height: 1.78 m (5 ft 10 in)
- Position: Defender

Team information
- Current team: DPMM
- Number: 21

Youth career
- PIP
- 2017–2018: Tabuan Muda
- 2019–2021: DPMM

Senior career*
Years	Team	Apps	(Gls)
2019–2020	DPMM II		(0)
2023	MS ABDB	16	(2)
2024–	DPMM	29	(0)

International career^{‡}
2019	Brunei U16	9	(0)
2019	Brunei U19	4	(0)
2022–	Brunei U23	12	(0)
2023–	Brunei	17	(1)
- * Club domestic league appearances and goals as of 20 December 2025 ‡ National team caps and goals as of 19 November 2026

Soldadu Mohammad Nazry Aiman bin Azaman (born 1 July 2004) is a Bruneian professional footballer who plays as a defender for Malaysia Super League club DPMM FC and the Brunei national team.

== Club career ==
=== DPMM ===
Nazry developed his footballing skills with the DPMM youth teams from 2019 to 2021. He was also registered with the local side that won the 2018–19 Brunei Premier League unbeaten thanks to the goals of Hakeme Yazid Said and Abdul Azizi Ali Rahman.

=== MS ABDB ===
Nazry joined the football team of the Royal Brunei Armed Forces for the 2023 Brunei Super League and was a regular starter under coach Yusof Matyassin. On 26 May, Nazry scored the winning goal against the then undefeated league leaders Wijaya. He added to his goal tally with the final goal of the game in a 5–0 victory over BAKES on 6 August. MS ABDB FT finished the season in a respectable fourth place out of 16 teams.

=== Return to DPMM ===
In March 2024, DPMM announced the signing of Nazry along with several other local talents to the first team for the upcoming 2024–25 Singapore Premier League season. He signed full terms on 8 May and was given the number 21 shirt. He made his professional league debut on 22 June against Geylang International as a substitute in a 3–3 draw at the Hassanal Bolkiah National Stadium, which was the first time DPMM played a Singapore Premier League home fixture in Brunei since the COVID-19 pandemic.

On 1 February 2025, in the first fixture for DPMM at the 2024–25 Singapore Cup away against BG Tampines Rovers at Jalan Besar Stadium, Nazry scored an equaliser in the fifth minute of stoppage time to level the game 1–1.

== International career ==
=== Youth ===
Nazry was the captain for the Brunei under-15s at the 2019 AFF U-15 Championship in Thailand in July–August. The Young Wasps finished the tournament with one point out of five games, managing a 1–1 draw with Cambodia. A month later, he was Indonesia-bound for the 2020 AFC U-16 Championship qualification group with the hosts, China, the Northern Marianas and Philippines. He led the team to a 5–1 victory against the islanders in the second group game, and finished in fourth place.

The following November, he was promoted to the under-19s participating in the 2020 AFC U-19 Championship qualification matches held in Phnom Penh. He featured from the start in the first game against the Northern Marianas in a 4–3 victory. He made three further appearances, each of them heavy defeats to Thailand, Malaysia and Cambodia.

Nazry's next international youth tournament was with the under-23s at the February 2022 AFF U-23 Championship held in Cambodia. Beaten 6–0 by the hosts in the first game, the Young Wasps were unable to recover from the setback despite the heroics of Hakeme Yazid Said who managed to score against Timor-Leste and the Philippines. In August 2023, Nazry was called up to the same age group for the 2023 AFF U-23 Championship held in Thailand as well as the 2024 AFC U-23 Asian Cup qualification matches in Jordan the following month. He made a total of seven appearances in the two fruitless campaigns for the Young Wasps.

=== Senior ===
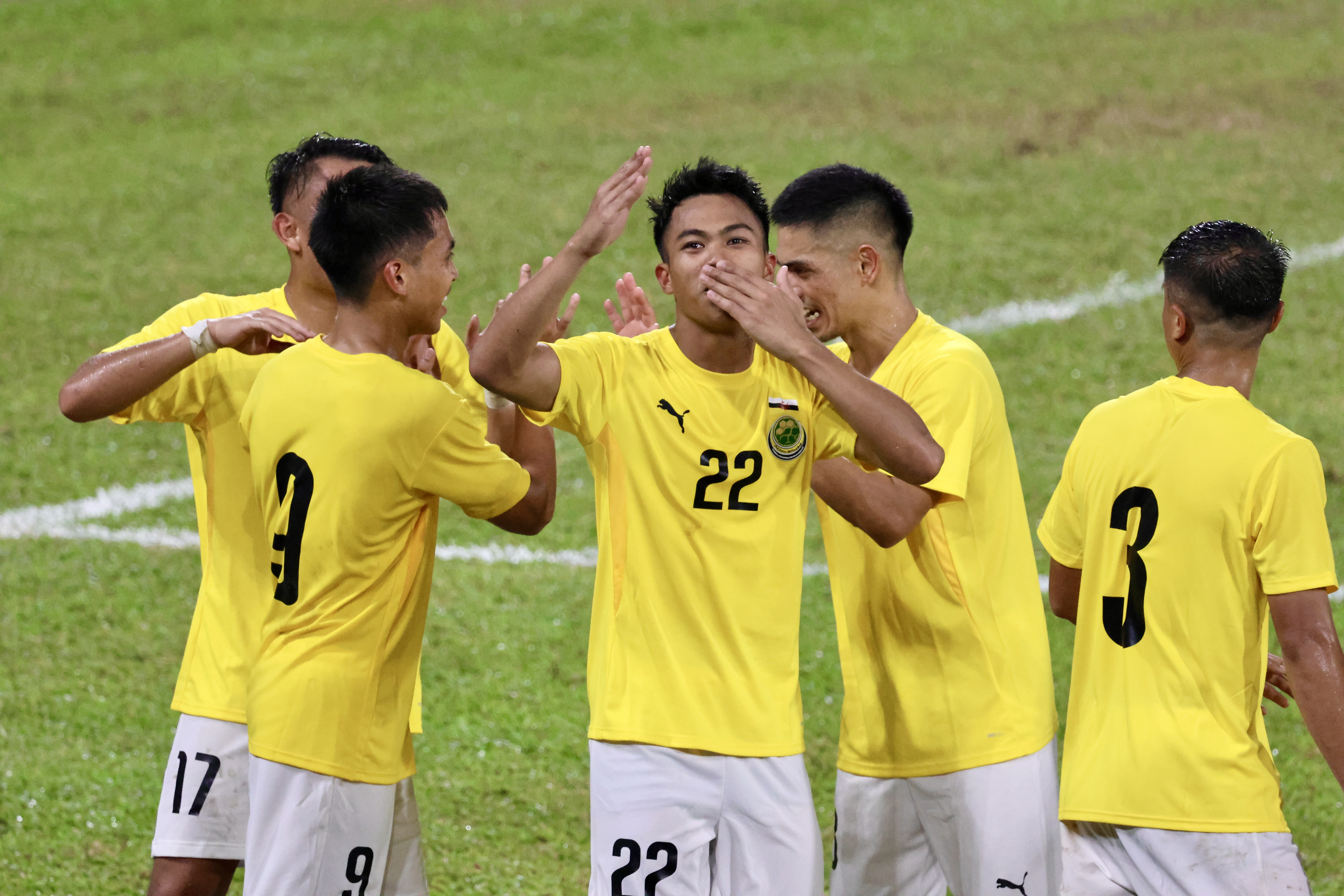
Nazry celebrating his goal against Macau at the 2027 AFC Asian Cup qualification

Nazry was given his first callup to the full international team in October 2023 at the 2026 FIFA World Cup qualifying matches, a two-legged affair against regional powerhouse Indonesia. He was an unused substitute in both games, which finished 0–12 on aggregate.

In March 2024, he travelled to Saudi Arabia with the national team for the 2024 FIFA Series against Bermuda and Vanuatu, but did not see action. He finally made his international debut on 8 June 2024 against Sri Lanka, as a substitute for Faturrahman Embran in a 1–0 victory. He made the starting lineup against the same opposition five days later, the Wasps claiming a second victory against the South Asian nation.

The following September, Nazry was selected for the Wasps competing at the play-offs for the third round of the 2027 AFC Asian Cup qualification in a two-legged tie against Macau. He was given a start in the first leg at Bandar Seri Begawan on the 6th and scored Brunei's second goal, which was also his first international goal, in a 3–0 victory. The Wasps eventually won the tie 4–0 on aggregate. Nazry played twice against Timor-Leste at the 2024 ASEAN Championship qualification that took place the following month, but this time Brunei failed to win the tie 0–1 on aggregate, knocking them out of the regional tournament.

Nazry's next international appearance was on 25 March 2025 against Lebanon at Saoud bin Abdulrahman Stadium in Doha for the first group game of the 2027 AFC Asian Cup qualification. He was deployed from the start by Fabio Maciel as a left wing-back and lasted the whole match in a 5–0 defeat to the Cedars.

In the following international fixtures for Brunei, Maciel deployed Nazry as the starting right back for both the friendly match against Sri Lanka held in Bangkok, Thailand on 5 June and also the 2027 AFC Asian Cup qualification match against Bhutan at home ground on the 10th. The Wasps were defeated by the odd goal against the Lankans but came out victorious five days later in front of the home crowd.

Nazry was back with the Wasps for the Asian Cup qualification fixtures home and away against Yemen in October 2025. He started both matches at right wing back but had a torrid time against the Middle Eastern side, resulting in two defeats in the space of six days. He was deployed as a left wing back against Lebanon once again in the home fixture of the same competition a month later on 18 November, resulting in a 0–3 loss for Brunei.

In June 2026, Nazry joined up with the Wasps under Ali Mustafa for the 2026 ASEAN Championship qualification matches against Timor-Leste. He was a second-half substitute for Nurikhwan Othman in a 1–3 loss in the away leg, and Brunei lost the tie 1–6 on aggregate. He also made two further appearances at the 2026 FIFA ASEAN Cup that September, starting in two defeats to Laos and Hong Kong. Later in the year, he played twice at the 2026 King's Cup against Thailand and Oman.

== Career statistics ==
=== International goals ===
No.	Date	Venue	Opponent	Score	Result	Competition
1.	6 September 2024	Hassanal Bolkiah National Stadium, Bandar Seri Begawan, Brunei	Macau	2–0	3–0	2027 AFC Asian Cup qualification
