= Julio Cruz =

Julio Cruz may refer to:

- Julio Cruz (Argentine footballer) (born 1974), Argentine forward
- Julio Cruz (Mexican footballer) (born 1995), Mexican striker
- Julio Cruz (baseball) (1954–2022), American second baseman
