= Miguel Oliveira (footballer, born 1995) =

Portuguese football player

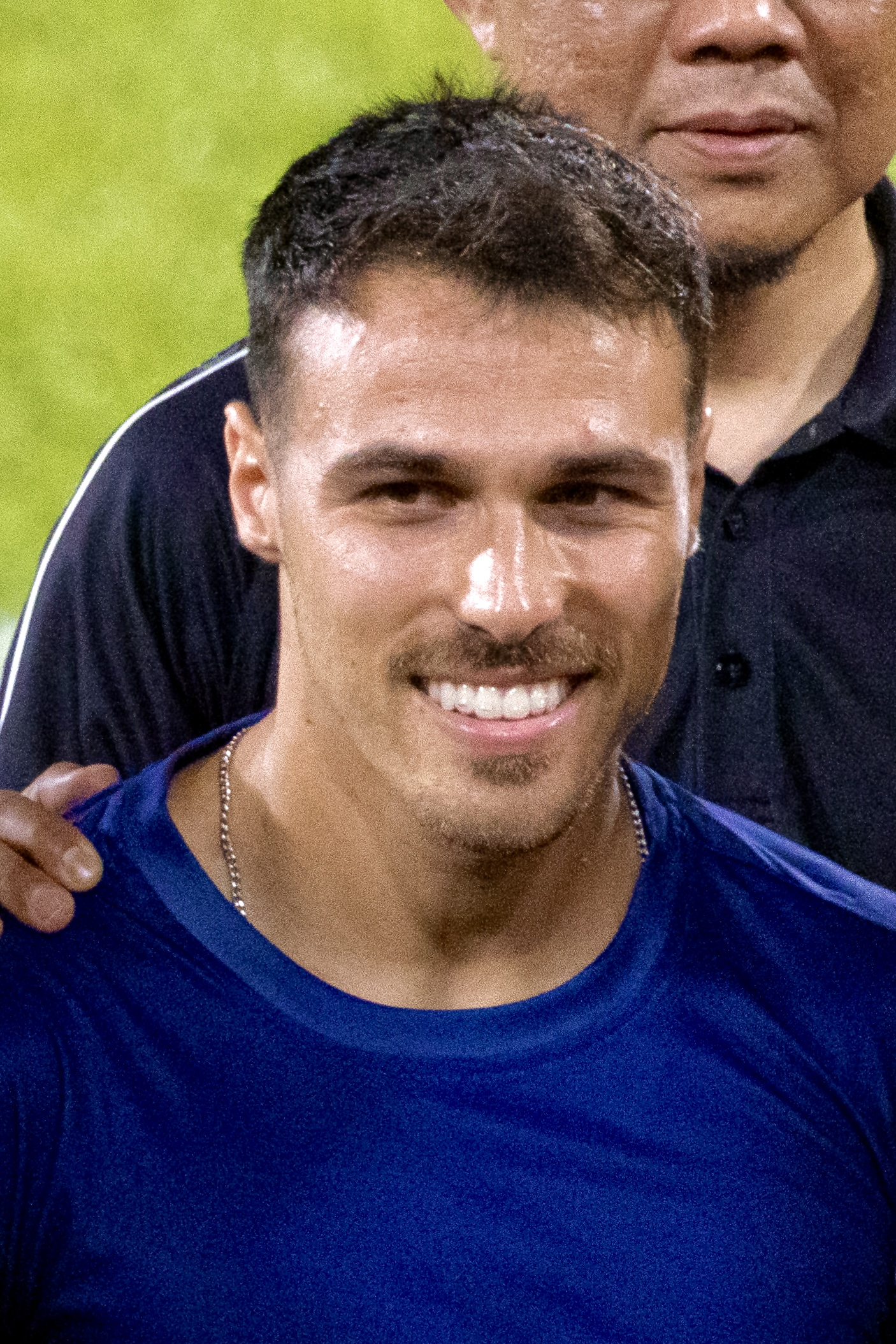
- Oliveira with DPMM in 2024

Personal information
- Full name: Miguel Ângelo Agostinho Oliveira
- Date of birth: 22 June 1995 (age 31)
- Place of birth: Ponte de Sor, Portugal
- Height: 1.67 m (5 ft 6 in)
- Position: Winger

Team information
- Current team: DPMM
- Number: 10

Youth career
- 2002–2003: Eléctrico
- 2003–2010: Sporting CP
- 2010–2012: Eléctrico

Senior career*
Years	Team	Apps	(Gls)
2012–2018	Eléctrico	94	(15)
2018–2019	Loures	15	(1)
2019	Gibraltar United	0	(0)
2019	1º Dezembro	8	(0)
2019–2021	Damastas	18	(13)
2021	Condeixa	17	(1)
2021–2022	Atsalenios		
2022–2023	Yarmouk		
2024–	DPMM	58	(15)
- * Club domestic league appearances and goals as of 20 November 2026

Miguel Ângelo Agostinho Oliveira (born 22 June 1995) is a Portuguese professional footballer who plays primarily as a winger for Malaysia Super League club Brunei DPMM FC.

== Career ==
Oliveira previously played for Al Yarmouk of the Kuwaiti Division One, before joining compatriot Rui Capela who was the head coach at Bruneian side DPMM at the start of the 2024–25 Singapore Premier League.

Oliveira made his DPMM debut against Young Lions on 11 May 2024, scoring in the first half of the match in a 2–1 away victory. Later in the season, he scored another brace, including the matchwinner in a 3–2 win against title contenders BG Tampines Rovers on 22 September, breaking the latter's unbeaten run since the season commenced. He made 29 appearances in the league, scoring 10 goals including DPMM's final goal of the season, the winning goal in a 3–2 victory over Hougang United on 24 May 2025.

After DPMM moved to the Malaysia Super League from the 2025–26 season, Oliveira took the vacant number 10 shirt while handing number nine to new signing Ramadhan Sananta and it was the Indonesian who assisted Oliveira's first goal in Malaysia in their league opener, a 2–2 draw against PDRM FC on 9 August 2025. He ended his first full campaign in Malaysia with 22 appearances, three goals and four assists to his name.

Oliveira agreed to an extension of his DPMM deal for one more season in June 2026. In the first fixture of the 2026–27 season for the Bruneian club, he netted the only goal of the game against Penang F.C. on 23 August 2026.

== Career statistics ==
As of 20 November 2026

Appearances and goals by club, season and competition
Club	Season	League			Cup		Other		Total	
Club	Season	Division	Apps	Goals	Apps	Goals	Apps	Goals	Apps	Goals
Eléctrico	2012–13	Terceira Divisão	25	3	0	0	0	0	25	3
Eléctrico	2013–14	Portalegre 1ª Divisão	14	7	0	0	0	0	14	7
Eléctrico	2014–15	Campeonato Nacional de Seniores	0	0	0	0	0	0	0	0
Eléctrico	2015–16	Campeonato de Portugal	20	0	0	0	0	0	20	0
Eléctrico	2016–17	Portalegre 1ª Divisão	10	4	0	0	0	0	10	4
Eléctrico	2017–18	Campeonato de Portugal	25	1	2	1	0	0	25	2
Eléctrico	Total		94	15	2	1	0	0	96	16
Loures	2018–19	Campeonato de Portugal	15	1	3	0	0	0	18	1
1º Dezembro	2018–19	Campeonato de Portugal	8	0	0	0	0	0	8	0
AO Damastas	2019–20	Heraklion FCA A1 Division	14	8	0	0	0	0	14	8
AO Damastas	2020–21	Gamma Ethniki	4	5	0	0	0	0	4	5
AO Damastas	Total		18	13	0	0	0	0	18	13
Clube Condeixa	2020–21	Campeonato de Portugal	17	1	0	0	0	0	17	1
DPMM FC	2024–25	Singapore Premier League	29	10	6	1	0	0	35	11
DPMM FC	2025–26	Malaysia Super League	22	3	1	1	3 (Note: Appearance in Malaysia Cup)	0	26	4
DPMM FC	2026–27	Malaysia Super League	7	1	6	2	0	0	13	3
DPMM FC	Total		58	15	13	4	3	0	74	18
Career total			210	45	18	5	3	0	231	49
