= Estádio Luís Augusto de Oliveira =

Soccer stadium in Brazil

Coordinates: 22.031517°S 47.901764°W

- O Luisão
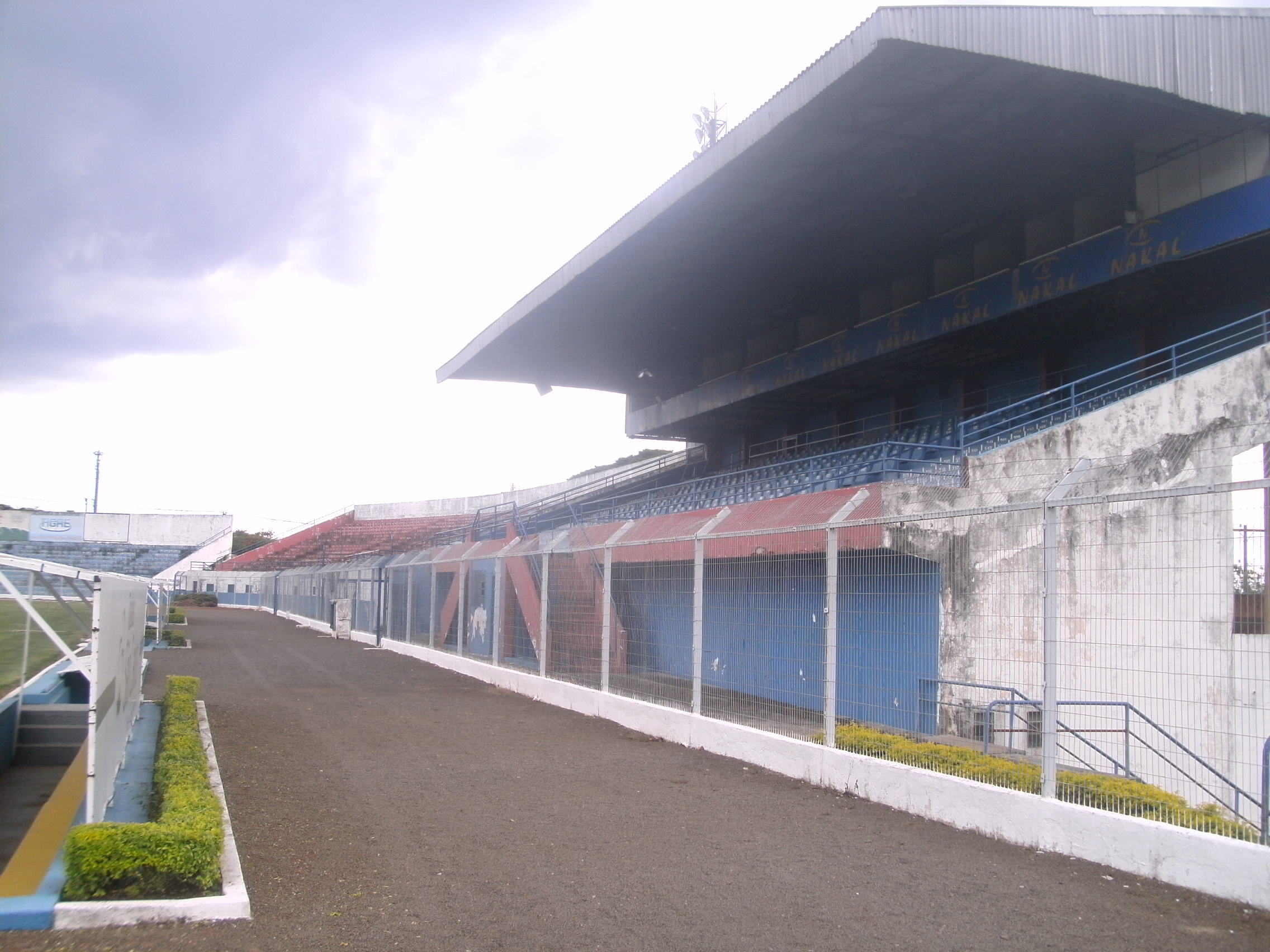
- Interactive map of Estádio Luís Augusto de Oliveira
- Full name: Estádio Municipal Prof. Luís Augusto de Oliveira
- Former names: Campo da Boa Vista (1952); Praça de Esportes Prof. Luís Augusto de Oliveira (1956)
- Location: São Carlos, São Paulo, Brazil
- Owner: São Carlos Municipality
- Operator: Municipal Sports and Leisure Secretary
- Capacity: 10,000
- Surface: Natural grass
- Record attendance: 23,712
- Field size: 105 by 66 metres (114.8 yd × 72.2 yd)

Construction
- Groundbreaking: 1952
- Built: 1952 to 1968
- Opened: November 3, 1968
- Renovated: 1956, 1957, 1968, 1989, 2005 and 2006
- Expanded: 1984 and 1989
- Cost: Cr$ 350 milhões - 1966
- Structural engineer: Lafael Petroni

Tenants
- Sãocarlense; São Carlos FC; São-Carlense

Estádio Municipal Prof. Luís Augusto de Oliveira, usually known as Estádio Luisão, or just O Luisão, is a football (soccer) stadium in São Carlos, São Paulo, Brazil. The stadium has a maximum capacity of 14,359. It was inaugurated on November 3, 1968. The stadium is owned by the São Carlos City Hall, and its formal name honors Luís Augusto de Oliveira (b. 5 December 1900, d. 14 July 1956), who was the mayor of São Carlos. São Carlos FC usually plays their home matches at the stadium, and has a pitch size of 105 m × 68 m (344 ft × 223 ft). Luisão means Luisão (Big Louis, in English).

== History ==
The inaugural match was played on November 3, 1968, when amateur Seleção Amadora A and B of São Carlos beat AA Itapuí 5–0, and São Paulo FC beat SE Palmeiras 3–2. The first goal of the stadium was scored by Talin (amateur) Seleção Amadora A and B of São Carlos, and by Antoninho (professional) (São Paulo FC).

The stadium's attendance record currently stands at 23,712 people, set on June 24, 1979, when Corinthians beat GE Sãocarlense 6–2.

On September 7, 1976, the stadium lighting was inaugurated. GE Sãocarlense beat Ferroviária 1–0 in the lighting inaugural match.

On November 4, 1982, there was the inauguration of the new towers and new lighting reflectors with 48 reflectors, 12 for each tower, providing 600 lux lighting, and the new bleachers with accommodation next to the covered bleachers. GE Sãocarlense lose Ferroviária (mixed) 1–2 in the lighting inaugural match.
