= Nur Ikhwan Othman =

Bruneian footballer (born 1993)

Nur Ikhwan
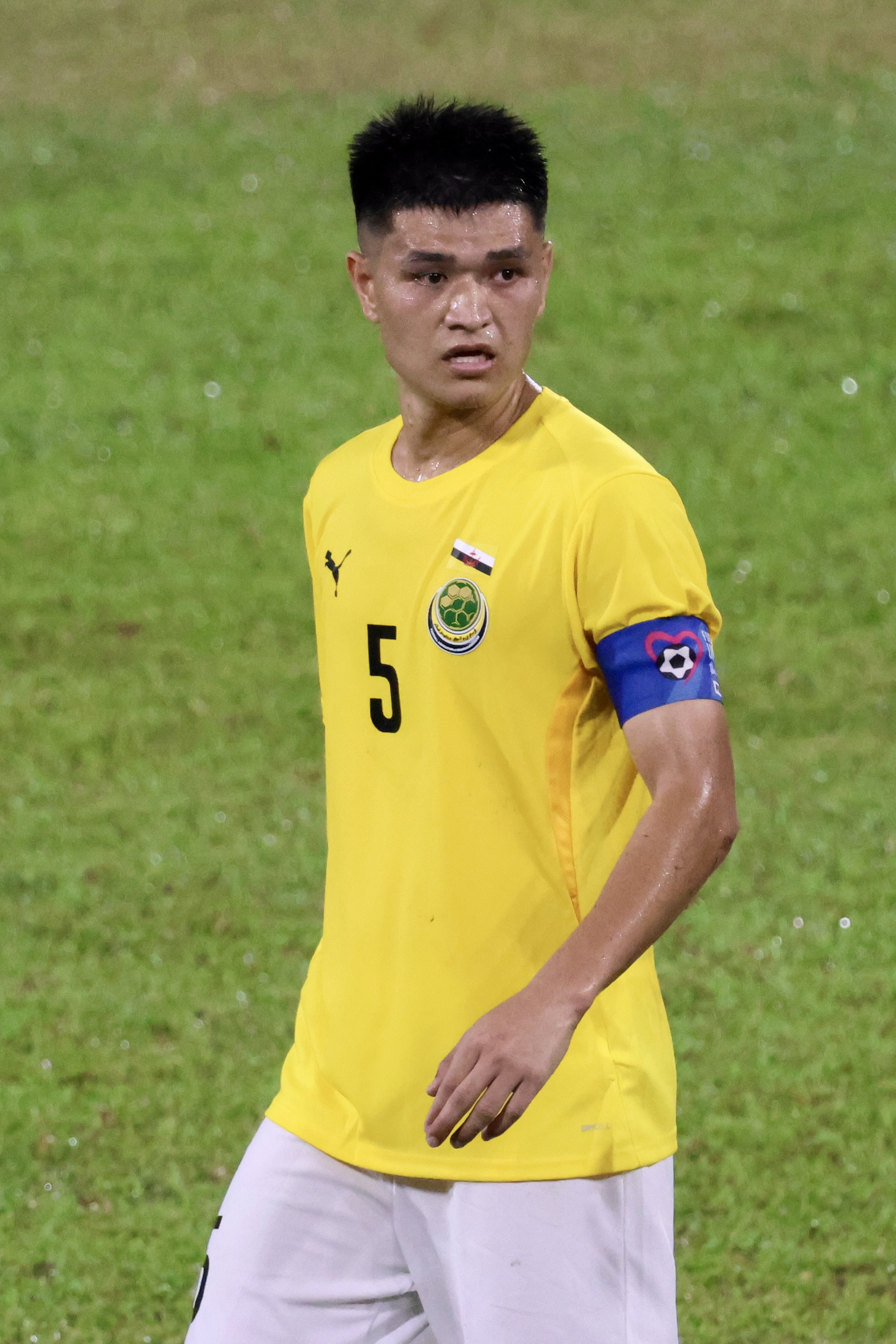
- Nur Ikhwan captaining Brunei in 2024

Personal information
- Full name: Mohammad Nurikhwan bin Othman
- Date of birth: 15 January 1993 (age 33)
- Place of birth: Brunei
- Height: 1.72 m (5 ft 7 1/2 in)
- Positions: Defender; midfielder

Team information
- Current team: DPMM
- Number: 19

Youth career
- 2010–2012: Sports School

Senior career*
Years	Team	Apps	(Gls)
2010–2011	Brunei Youth Team		
2012–2015	Indera		(16)
2016–	DPMM	99	(2)

International career^{‡}
2012–2014	Brunei U21	11	(1)
2012–2013	Brunei U23	5	(0)
2012–	Brunei	29	(2)
- * Club domestic league appearances and goals as of 31 October 2026 ‡ National team caps and goals as of 30 September 2026

Mohammad Nurikhwan bin Othman (born 15 January 1993) is a Bruneian professional footballer who plays as a defender or midfielder for DPMM and the Brunei national team.

== Club career ==
Nurikhwan attended Brunei's Sports School as a youngster and progressed enough to be a regular in the national youth team side that played in the Brunei Premier League II in 2010 and 2011. After the creation of the Brunei National Football League (precursor to the Brunei Super League) by the newly formed NFABD, the young prodigy chose Indera SC as his club, becoming league champions in 2012-13 and 2014.

Nurikhwan signed for professional side DPMM of the S.League in 2016 and made his debut in a 3–2 loss to Albirex Niigata (S) on 13 February.

Nurikhwan was converted into a defender by new head coach Adrian Pennock in the 2019 season, mirroring his teammate Yura Indera Putera in doing so. On 6 July of that season, in the away game against Warriors FC, he was shown a straight red for felling Sahil Suhaimi in the penalty box and was adjudged by the referee to have denied the Singaporean a goal-scoring opportunity. This turned the tide to the home side's advantage and the game finished in a 3–3 draw.

Nurikhwan became a Singapore Premier League champion in September 2019 in his first season operating as a centre-back, his club also registering the joint-best defense in the league.

Nurikhwan scored his first DPMM goal in the first fixture of the 2021 Brunei Super League against BAKES on 28 June 2021. With his team playing domestically for the third year in a row in 2022, he performed solidly against local opposition at the 2022 Brunei FA Cup, being awarded the Player of the Tournament after the final where his team won 2–1 against Kasuka on 4 December.

Nurikhwan missed the entirety of 2023 due to injury but returned the next season partnering Yura in central defence after a long-term injury to Patrick Flottmann just two games into the season hampered the team and ultimately cost Rui Capela his job. His replacement Jamie McAllister adapted a 3-5-2 formation in the second half of the season and Nurikhwan performed well alongside Yura and Damir Muminovic as a result.

On 3 March 2025, Nurikhwan scored a header against Albirex Niigata (S) in a 3–1 win in the Singapore Cup. The following month, he netted his first Singapore Premier League goal in a 3–1 victory over Geylang International on 27 April.

== International career ==
Nurikhwan played with the Brunei Under-21s in the 2012 Hassanal Bolkiah Trophy when the home side emerged as victors. He played every game and scored in the semi-final against Myanmar. He was made captain for the 2014 edition although his side failed to defend the title.

Nurikhwan's full international career began when he played the first half in a friendly against Indonesia on 26 September 2012. He played for the Wasps in the 2012, 2014 and 2018 AFF Suzuki Cup qualifying rounds. He was also poised to join the national team for the 2022 World Cup first-round qualifying but declared himself unavailable.

Nurikhwan returned to the national team in September 2022 for the friendly matches against the Maldives and Laos. He started the match against the island nation on 21 September which ended in a 0–3 loss. Later that November, he played at centre-back for both legs of the 2022 AFF Mitsubishi Electric Cup qualifying against Timor-Leste held in Brunei. The Wasps qualified for the Cup by winning 6–3 on aggregate. The following month, he made three starts against Thailand, the Philippines and Cambodia and managed to score his first international goal against Cambodia in a 5–1 defeat.

After missing the whole of 2023 with injury, Nurikhwan was selected for the national team playing in the 2024 FIFA Series in March 2024. He played two games from the start against Bermuda in a 2–0 loss and against Vanuatu in a 2–3 victory, scoring the second goal for Brunei in the match. He also made two appearances in central midfield against Sri Lanka the following June where both games resulted in 1–0 victories to the Wasps.

In September 2024, Nurikhwan was selected for the 2027 Asian Cup qualification play-off matches against Macau over two legs. He partnered Yura Yunos in central defence for both matches and contributed to a 4–0 aggregate win for the Wasps, enabling their participation to the third round of qualification to the 2027 Asian Cup. The same pairing kept their places at the 2024 ASEAN Championship qualification against Timor-Leste over two legs the following month, but a solitary goal by Gali Freitas that was conceded at home was enough to eliminate them from the competition. There was to be one final sting in 2024 for Nurikhwan as he and the Wasps conceded eleven goals against Russia in a friendly at Krasnodar on 15 November.

Nurikhwan came back to the national team in early October 2025 for the double header against Yemen in the 2027 Asian Cup qualifying, starting both matches in Bandar Seri Begawan and in Kuwait City the following week, where the scorelines favoured the Middle Eastern team. A month later, the Wasps faced Lebanon in the same competition, and Nurikhwan was handed the captaincy for the match. The Cedars were victorious with a 0–3 score. Nurikhwan kept the armband in March 2026 away against Bhutan but tasted another defeat, the game finishing 2–1 to the designated home team.

In June 2026 Nurikhwan featured twice for the Wasps against Timor-Leste at the 2026 ASEAN Championship qualification, playing the first leg wearing the captain's armband. Brunei were eliminated from the 2026 ASEAN Championship in a 6–1 aggregate loss. The following September, he played twice in the 2026 FIFA ASEAN Cup, where Brunei suffered two losses against Laos and Hong Kong.

== International goals ==
No.	Date	Venue	Opponent	Score	Result	Competition
1.	29 December 2022	Morodok Techo National Stadium, Phnom Penh, Cambodia	Cambodia	1–0	1–5	2022 AFF Championship
2.	27 March 2024	King Abdullah Sports City Reserve Stadium, Jeddah, Saudi Arabia	Vanuatu	2–2	3–2	2024 FIFA Series

== Honours ==
=== Team ===
Indera SC

- Brunei Super League (2): 2012–13, 2014

DPMM FC

- Singapore Premier League: 2019
- Brunei FA Cup: 2022

=== International ===
Brunei national under-21 football team

- Hassanal Bolkiah Trophy: 2012

=== Individual ===
- Meritorious Service Medal (PJK; 2012)
- 2022 Brunei FA Cup Player of the Tournament
