= Syafiq Safiuddin =

Bruneian footballer (born 2002)

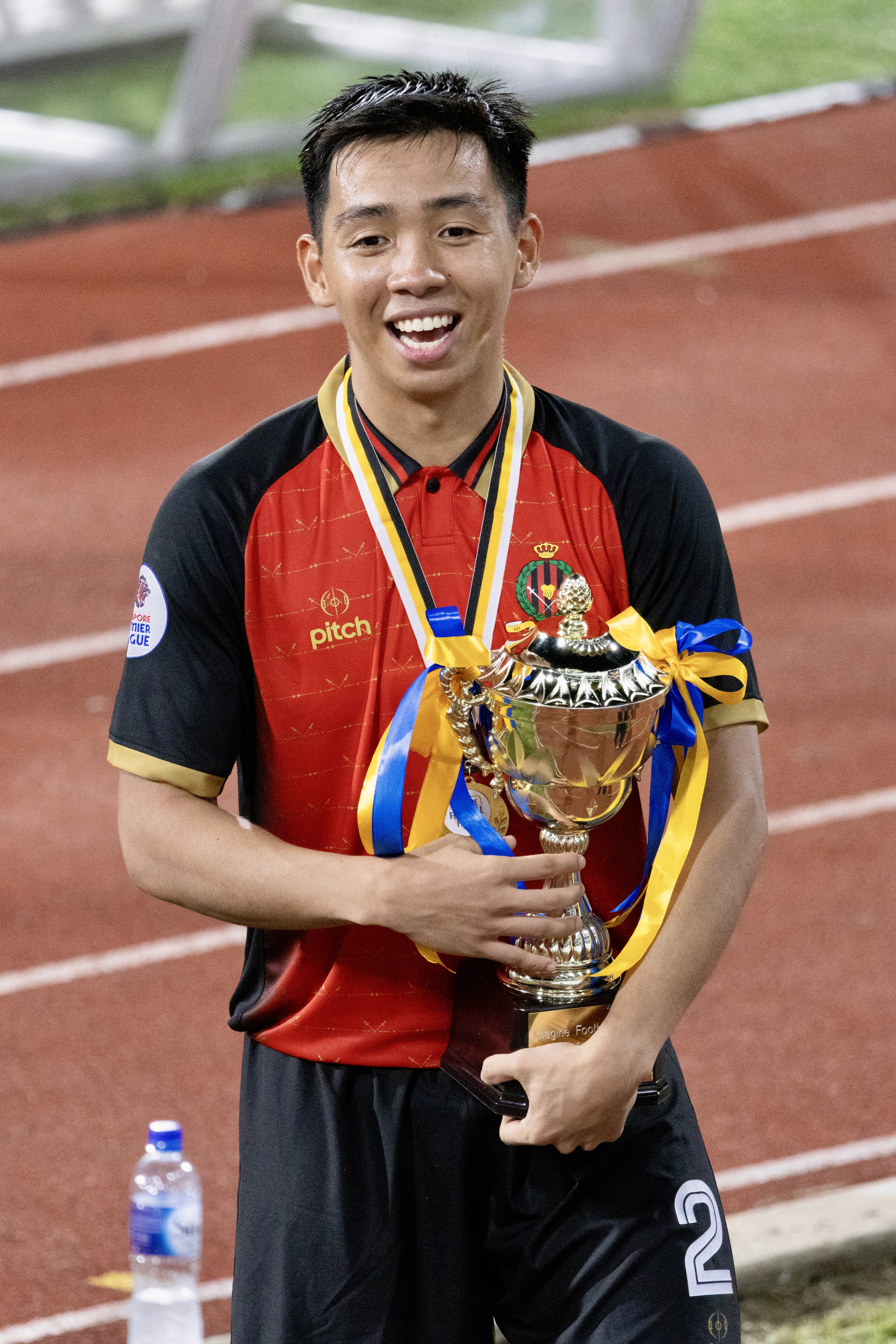
- Syafiq with DPMM in 2024

Personal information
- Full name: Muhammad Syafiq Safiuddin bin Abdul Shariff
- Date of birth: 16 July 2002 (age 24)
- Place of birth: Bandar Seri Begawan, Brunei
- Height: 1.63 m (5 ft 4 in)
- Positions: Defender; midfielder

Team information
- Current team: DPMM FC
- Number: 2

Youth career
- –2018: PIP
- 2019: DPMM

Senior career*
| Years | Team | Apps | (Gls) |
| 2018–2020 | Tabuan Muda | | (2) |
| 2021–2023 | Indera | | (0) |
| 2024– | DPMM | 31 | (0) |

International career^{‡}
| 2019 | Brunei U19 | 8 | (0) |
| 2022– | Brunei U23 | 9 | (0) |
| 2024– | Brunei | 11 | (1) |
- * Club domestic league appearances and goals as of 20 November 2026 ‡ National team caps and goals as of 19 November 2026

Muhammad Syafiq Safiuddin bin Abdul Shariff (born 16 July 2002) is a Bruneian footballer who plays as a right-sided midfielder or wing-back for DPMM of the Malaysia Super League and the Brunei national team.

== Club career ==
=== Youth ===
Syafiq was a young talent under the Projek Ikan Pusu local grassroots football programme that won the national under-16 youth league in 2018.

=== Tabuan Muda ===
Syafiq afterwards joined Tabuan Muda, the league team made of Brunei youth internationals formed by the NFABD and finished second in the 2018–19 Brunei Premier League.

=== Indera ===
Syafiq joined two-time league winners Indera SC in 2021, becoming a regular starter in the 2023 season. His team finished as runners-up behind runaway winners Kasuka.

=== DPMM ===
In March 2024, Syafiq linked up with DPMM as one of their new local signings for the upcoming 2024–25 Singapore Premier League. He signed his contract on 8 May of that year. He made his competitive debut for DPMM as a starter three days later in a 1–2 away victory against the Young Lions at Jalan Besar Stadium.

After DPMM moved to the Malaysia Super League in the 2025–26 season, Syafiq found less playing time due to the presence of Malaysian right back Fairuz Zakaria. He finally made his first start of the season against Johor Darul Ta'zim on 25 October 2025 when after the half-hour mark, he was sent off for a second yellow after tripping Óscar Arribas in the penalty box. The Brunei side capitulated to a 10–0 defeat immediately after the incident.

== International career ==
=== Youth ===
As part of Tabuan Muda, Syafiq made a total of eight appearances for the Brunei under-19s at the 2019 AFF U-18 Youth Championship held in Vietnam in August of that year, as well as the 2020 AFC U-19 Championship qualification matches hosted by Cambodia the following month. He featured in the Young Wasps' only victory of said matches, a 3–4 win over the Northern Mariana Islands on 2 November.

In February 2022, Syafiq was selected for the Brunei under-23 squad competing at the 2022 AFF U-23 Championship in Phnom Penh, Cambodia. He featured in all three games. The following year, Syafiq was involved in the same age group for two upcoming competitions namely the 2023 AFF U-23 Championship in Thailand in August 2023 and also the 2024 AFC U-23 Asian Cup qualifying games in the month after. He played in all but one game for the Young Wasps, making a total of six appearances.

=== Senior ===
Syafiq was called up for the Brunei national team to play at the newly created 2024 FIFA Series held in Saudi Arabia in March 2024. He made his senior international debut as a starter in a 2–0 defeat at the hands of Bermuda on 22 March. He made an impact on his second appearance against Vanuatu four days later when he headed in a Hakeme Yazid Said free-kick that cannoned off the post to score Brunei's first goal of the match, which was also his first international goal. The game finished 2–3 to the Wasps after a last-minute winner was produced from another of Hakeme's free-kicks.

In June 2024, Syafiq made two appearances against Sri Lanka in two friendly matches held in Bandar Seri Begawan, all ending in 1–0 victories for the Wasps. The following September, he joined up with the Wasps for the play-offs to the third qualifying round of the 2027 Asian Cup. He played from the start in the second leg of the tie away in Macau where Brunei won 0–1 courtesy of an Azwan Ali Rahman strike in the tenth minute, winning 4–0 on aggregate.

In November 2024, Syafiq boarded a plane to Krasnodar for Brunei's friendly match against Russia, their first ever opponents from UEFA. He started the match on 15 November before limping off to an injury in the second half, the final score being 11–0 to the hosts.

Syafiq was included in Brunei's 23-man squad for the first fixture of the 2027 AFC Asian Cup qualification group on 25 March 2025 against Lebanon which was held on neutral ground in Doha, Qatar. He started the match as a right wing-back and was substituted for Alinur Rashimy Jufri on the hour mark, the match ended 5–0 to Lebanon. Later in the year, he made two substitute appearances against Yemen in the Asian Cup qualifying matches in October, both ending in defeats.

Syafiq was selected by Helme Panjang for the 2026 King's Cup held in Thailand that November. Playing at right-back, he suffered a 6–0 defeat against the hosts on the 14th. He was kept in the starting lineup against Oman three days later but only lasted the first half-hour in a 0–7 loss.

== International goals ==
| No. | Date | Venue | Opponent | Score | Result | Competition |
|---|---|---|---|---|---|---|
| 1. | 26 March 2024 | King Abdullah Sports City Reserve Stadium, Jeddah, Saudi Arabia | Vanuatu | 1–1 | 3–2 | 2024 FIFA Series |

== Honours ==
=== Club ===
==== Projek Ikan Pusu ====
- NFABD National Under-16 Youth League: 2018

==== Tabuan Muda ====
- Brunei Premier League: 2018–19 (runners-up)

==== Indera SC ====
- Brunei Super League: 2023 (runners-up)
