= São Carlos Futebol Clube =

Brazilian football club

São Carlos FC
- Full name: São Carlos Futebol Clube
- Nicknames: Águia da Central; Sanca
- Founded: 25 November 2004; 21 years ago
- Ground: Prof. Luiz Augusto de Oliveira
- Capacity: 10,000
- Chairman: Adílson Ferreira Brito
- League: Campeonato Paulista Segunda Divisão
- 2025: Paulista Segunda Divisão, 13th of 15
Home colours	Away colours

São Carlos Futebol Clube, more commonly referred to as São Carlos, is a Brazilian football club based in São Carlos, São Paulo.

Founded on 25 November 2004, they play in blue and yellow shirts, blue shorts and socks.

== History ==
The club was founded on 25 November 2004, by club company.

The mascot of the club is an Eagle.

== Honours ==
- Campeonato Paulista Série A4
  - Winners (2): 2005, 2015

== Stadium ==
São Carlos FC plays their matches at Luisão Stadium, inaugurated on 3 November 1968, with a maximum capacity of 10,000 people.

== Trivia ==
- The club's mascot is an eagle.
- São Carlos FC is the only São Carlos's club to reach the Campeonato Paulista third division.
