= Grêmio Desportivo São-Carlense =

São-Carlense
- Full name: Grêmio Desportivo São-Carlense
- Nickname(s): Lobo da Central; Grêmio; Tricolor
- Founded: 20 July 2016; 8 years ago
- Ground: Luís Augusto de Oliveira
- Capacity: 10,000
- President: Fábio Nogueira Spósito
- League: Campeonato Paulista Série A4
- 2024: Paulista Série A4, 5th of 16
Home colours	Away colours	Third colours

Grêmio Desportivo São-Carlense, commonly referred to as São-Carlense, is a Brazilian professional football club based in São Carlos, São Paulo. It competes in the Campeonato Paulista Segunda Divisão, the fourth tier of the São Paulo state football league.
