= Faturrahman Embran =

Bruneian footballer

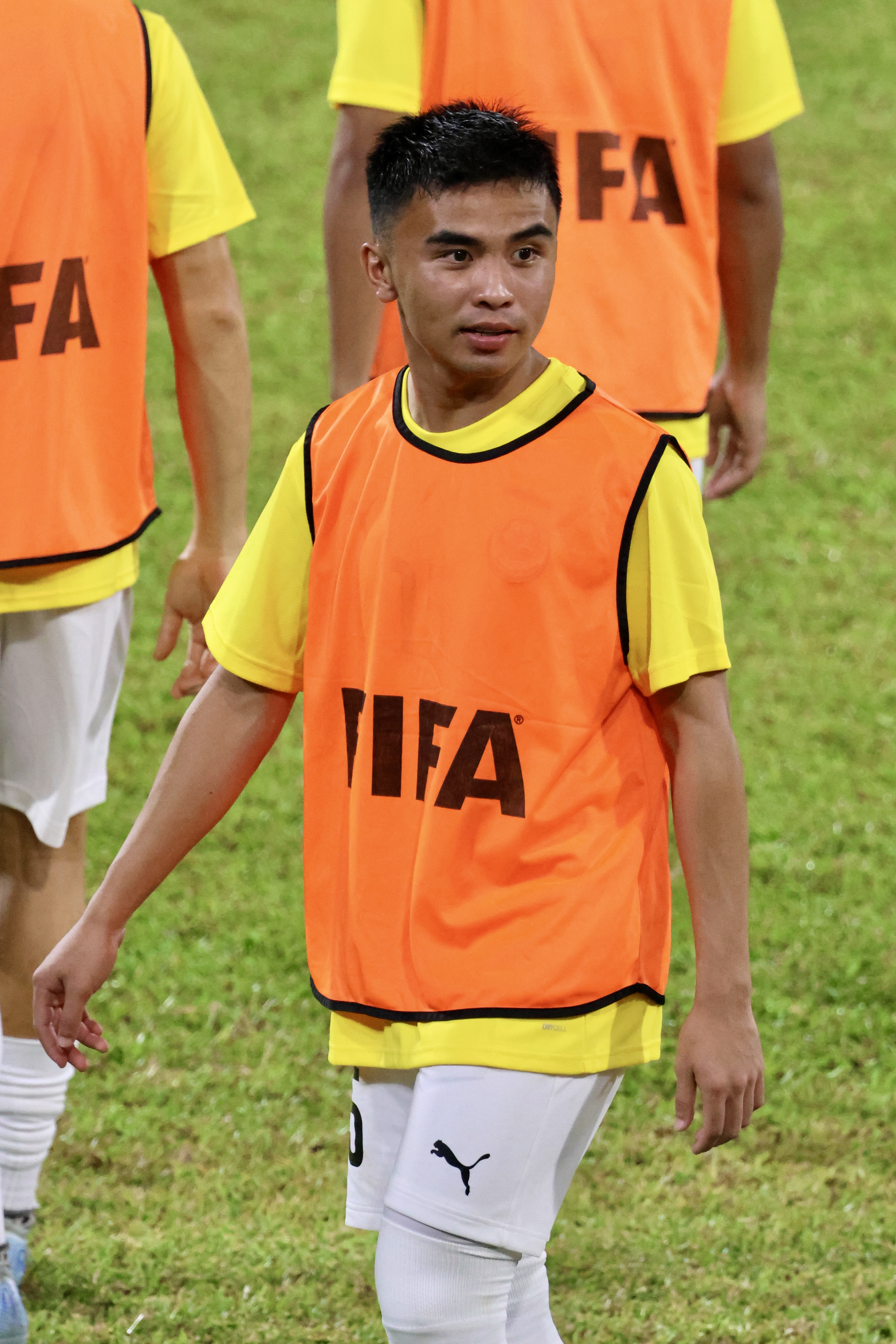
- Faturrahman with Brunei in 2024

Personal information
- Full name: Muhammad Faturrahman bin Awang Embran
- Date of birth: 22 August 1999 (age 27)
- Place of birth: Brunei
- Height: 1.70 m (5 ft 7 in)
- Positions: Midfielder; forward

Team information
- Current team: DPMM FC II
- Number: 7

Senior career*
Years	Team	Apps	(Gls)
2016–2023	Kota Ranger		(19)
2024–2026	DPMM	7	(0)
2026–	DPMM II	4	(0)

International career^{‡}
2024–	Brunei	14	(0)
- * Club domestic league appearances and goals as of 3 November 2026 ‡ National team caps and goals as of 16 November 2026

Muhammad Faturrahman bin Awang Embran (born 22 August 1999) is a Bruneian footballer who plays as a midfielder or forward for DPMM FC II of the Brunei Super League and also the Brunei national football team.

== Club career ==
=== Kota Ranger ===
In 2016, Faturrahman was scouted by Kota Ranger FC while attending Institut Tahfiz Al-Quran Sultan Haji Hassanal Bolkiah at the age of 16 and joined the first team the following year in the 2017–18 Brunei Super League. He scored his first two career goals in a 2–1 victory over Najip I-Team on 3 May 2017. He contributed six goals in an impressive first season where the Rangers finished just three points behind league champions MS ABDB in second place.

The following 2018–19 season saw the addition of talented youngster Nur Asyraffahmi Norsamri to the team who gave a major contribution to Kota Ranger's first ever FA Cup final victory. Faturrahman scored a total of five league goals for the campaign where his team finished in fifth position.

Faturrahman scored five further goals including a hat-trick against BAKES FC at the 2021 Brunei Super League before the league was abandoned due to the COVID-19 pandemic. He briefly left for further studies at the Ma’had Qiraat Al-Shoubra in Cairo, Egypt in October 2022. He returned in the middle of the 2023 Brunei Super League campaign, registering three goals for the Rangers as they finished third, seven points behind runaway champions Kasuka FC.

=== DPMM ===
In March 2024, Faturrahman was announced on DPMM's website to be one of several new local players to join the professional club for the upcoming 2024–25 Singapore Premier League. He officially signed for the royalty-owned club on 9 May. It was not until 23 February 2025 that he made his competitive debut for the team, as a late substitute in a 0–1 defeat to BG Tampines Rovers at Jalan Besar Stadium. He altogether made five substitute appearances in all competitions in his first season.

After managing only three games off the bench in his second season in the Malaysia Super League, Faturrahman was released from DPMM in July 2026.

== International career ==
Faturrahman was called up by Mario Rivera for the Brunei national team in February 2024 and was subsequently brought to Saudi Arabia for the newly created 2024 FIFA Series in the following month. He made his international debut as a second-half substitute in a 2–0 defeat to Bermuda on 22 March 2024.

Despite the lack of minutes for his club, Faturrahman was selected by interim head coach Jamie McAllister for Brunei's play-off tie against Macau for a spot at the third qualifying round of the 2027 Asian Cup in September 2024. He featured as a substitute in both fixtures where Brunei overcame their opponents with a 4–0 aggregate score.

Faturrahman was given a starting berth alongside Razimie Ramlli by new head coach Vinícius Eutrópio in a friendly against Russia on 15 November 2024. The powerful opponents were 11–0 victors in the match.

Under Fabio Maciel since January 2025, Faturrahman was regularly selected by him starting from the 2027 AFC Asian Cup qualification first fixture against Lebanon on 25 March that resulted in a 5–0 loss where he was an unused substitute. In the following June, he came on as a second-half substitute in a 1–0 friendly loss against Sri Lanka in Bangkok. Five days after, in the next Asian Cup qualifier against Bhutan, he came on for Nazirrudin Ismail in the final 15 minutes in a 2–1 victory on home ground.

In October 2025, Maciel selected Faturrahman for Brunei's Asian Cup qualification fixtures home and away against Yemen. He came in for Nazirrudin Ismail in the second half as the Wasps suffered a humbling 9–0 loss in the second Yemen match held in Kuwait on 14 October. In the following month at the same competition, Faturrahman played the final few minutes against Lebanon in a 0–3 defeat. In the last fixture of the qualification against Bhutan that was held in March 2026, he made a second-half cameo where Brunei were defeated once again with the score ending 2–1 to the Dragon Boys.

In June 2026, Faturrahman made two appearances at the 2026 ASEAN Championship qualification where they were beaten 1–6 on aggregate to Timor-Leste.

== Honours ==
Kota Ranger

- Brunei FA Cup: 2018–19

== Personal life ==
Faturrahman is also a qari and has competed in local and international Qur'an recitation competitions. He is the cousin of Brunei futsal international player Abu Suffian Adanan, and nephew of Azman Ilham Noor of Kasuka FC.
