= Julio Cruz (Mexican footballer) =

Mexican footballer (born 1995)

Personal information
- Full name: Julio César Cruz González
- Date of birth: 23 November 1995 (age 30)
- Place of birth: Minatitlán, Veracruz, Mexico
- Height: 1.60 m (5 ft 3 in)
- Position: Forward

Team information
- Current team: Tepatitlán
- Number: 39

Youth career
- Monterrey

Senior career*
| Years | Team | Apps | (Gls) |
| 2015–2018 | Monterrey | 4 | (0) |
| 2017 | → Belén (loan) | 16 | (11) |
| 2017 | → Herediano (loan) | 9 | (5) |
| 2018 | → Guadalupe (loan) | 7 | (1) |
| 2019 | Cartaginés | 35 | (14) |
| 2020 | San Carlos | 24 | (13) |
| 2021–2024 | Oaxaca | 72 | (35) |
| 2022 | → San Carlos (loan) | 11 | (4) |
| 2024 | DPMM | 14 | (6) |
| 2025–2026 | Oaxaca | 23 | (5) |
| 2026 | Mixco | 6 | (1) |
| 2026– | Tepatitlán | 1 | (0) |
- * Club domestic league appearances and goals as of 13 September 2026

Julio César Cruz González (born 23 November 1995) is a Mexican professional footballer who plays as a forward for Liga de Expansión MX club Tepatitlán. He played for clubs in Mexico, Costa Rica and Brunei.

== Club ==
=== Oaxaca FC ===
Cruz played for Oaxaca FC and scored a total of 34 goals for the team.

=== DPMM FC ===
Cruz moved to Brunei in 2024, joining DPMM FC playing in the Singapore Premier League. However, he was released in November 2024 before the mid-season transfer window.

== Career statistics ==
As of 27 March 2026

Appearances and goals by club, season and competition
| Club | Season | League | | | Cup | | Continental | | Other | | Total | |
| Club | Season | Division | Apps | Goals | Apps | Goals | Apps | Goals | Apps | Goals | Apps | Goals |
|---|---|---|---|---|---|---|---|---|---|---|---|---|
| Monterrey | 2017–18 | Liga MX | 3 | 0 | 3 | 1 | 0 | 0 | 0 | 0 | 6 | 1 |
| Belén (loan) | 2016–17 | Liga FPD | 16 | 11 | 0 | 0 | 0 | 0 | 0 | 0 | 16 | 11 |
| Herediano (loan) | 2017–18 | Liga FPD | 7 | 3 | 1 | 0 | 0 | 0 | 0 | 0 | 8 | 3 |
| Guadalupe (loan) | 2017–18 | Liga FPD | 7 | 2 | 0 | 0 | 0 | 0 | 0 | 0 | 7 | 2 |
| Cartaginés | 2018–19 | Liga FPD | 15 | 5 | 0 | 0 | 0 | 0 | 0 | 0 | 15 | 5 |
| Cartaginés | 2019–20 | Liga FPD | 20 | 8 | 0 | 0 | 0 | 0 | 0 | 0 | 20 | 8 |
| Cartaginés | Total | | 35 | 13 | 0 | 0 | 0 | 0 | 0 | 0 | 35 | 13 |
| San Carlos | 2019 | Chilean Primera División | 17 | 13 | 0 | 0 | 2 | 0 | 0 | 0 | 19 | 13 |
| San Carlos | 2020 | Chilean Primera División | 7 | 0 | 0 | 0 | 0 | 0 | 0 | 0 | 7 | 0 |
| San Carlos | Total | | 24 | 13 | 0 | 0 | 2 | 0 | 0 | 0 | 26 | 13 |
| Oaxaca | 2020–21 | Liga de Expansión MX | 16 | 10 | 0 | 0 | 0 | 0 | 0 | 0 | 16 | 10 |
| Oaxaca | 2021–22 | Liga de Expansión MX | 21 | 6 | 0 | 0 | 0 | 0 | 0 | 0 | 21 | 6 |
| Oaxaca | 2022–23 | Liga de Expansión MX | 13 | 6 | 0 | 0 | 0 | 0 | 0 | 0 | 13 | 6 |
| Oaxaca | 2023–24 | Liga de Expansión MX | 20 | 12 | 0 | 0 | 0 | 0 | 0 | 0 | 20 | 12 |
| Oaxaca | Total | | 70 | 34 | 0 | 0 | 0 | 0 | 0 | 0 | 70 | 34 |
| San Carlos (loan) | 2023 | Chilean Primera División | 11 | 4 | 0 | 0 | 0 | 0 | 0 | 0 | 11 | 4 |
| DPMM FC | 2024–25 | Singapore Premier League | 14 | 6 | 0 | 0 | 0 | 0 | 0 | 0 | 14 | 6 |
| Oaxaca | 2025–26 | Liga de Expansión MX | 23 | 5 | 0 | 0 | 0 | 0 | 0 | 0 | 23 | 5 |
| Career total | | | 209 | 92 | 4 | 1 | 2 | 0 | 0 | 0 | 215 | 93 |

== Honours ==
Individual

- Liga de Expansión MX Golden Boot: Guardianes 2021
