= Catanduva FC =

- Full name: Catanduva Futebol Clube
- Founded: 14 November 2017; 7 years ago
- Stadium: Sílvio Salles
- Capacity: 16,444
- President: Ernesto Pedro de Oliveira Rosa
- Head Coach: Ivan Canela
- League: Campeonato Paulista Série A3
- 2024: Paulista Série A3, 5th of 16

Catanduva Futebol Clube, commonly referred to as Catanduva, is a Brazilian professional football club based in Catanduva, São Paulo. Founded in 2017, the team compete in Campeonato Paulista Segunda Divisão, the fourth tier of the São Paulo state football league.

== History ==
The club was established in 2017, conceived by Father Osvaldo de Oliveira Rosa, the driving force behind the "Padre Osvaldo" football school, which was established in 2010 as a social project catering to approximately 300 young boys.

The club made its professional debut in the Campeonato Paulista Segunda Divisão in 2018, commencing their campaign with promising results. However, as the competition progressed, the team experienced a significant decline in performance, enduring several defeats and draws. Accumulating only a few points, they ultimately finished second to last in their group, narrowly edging out their city rivals, Grêmio Catanduvense.
