= Rui Capela =

Portuguese footballer and coach

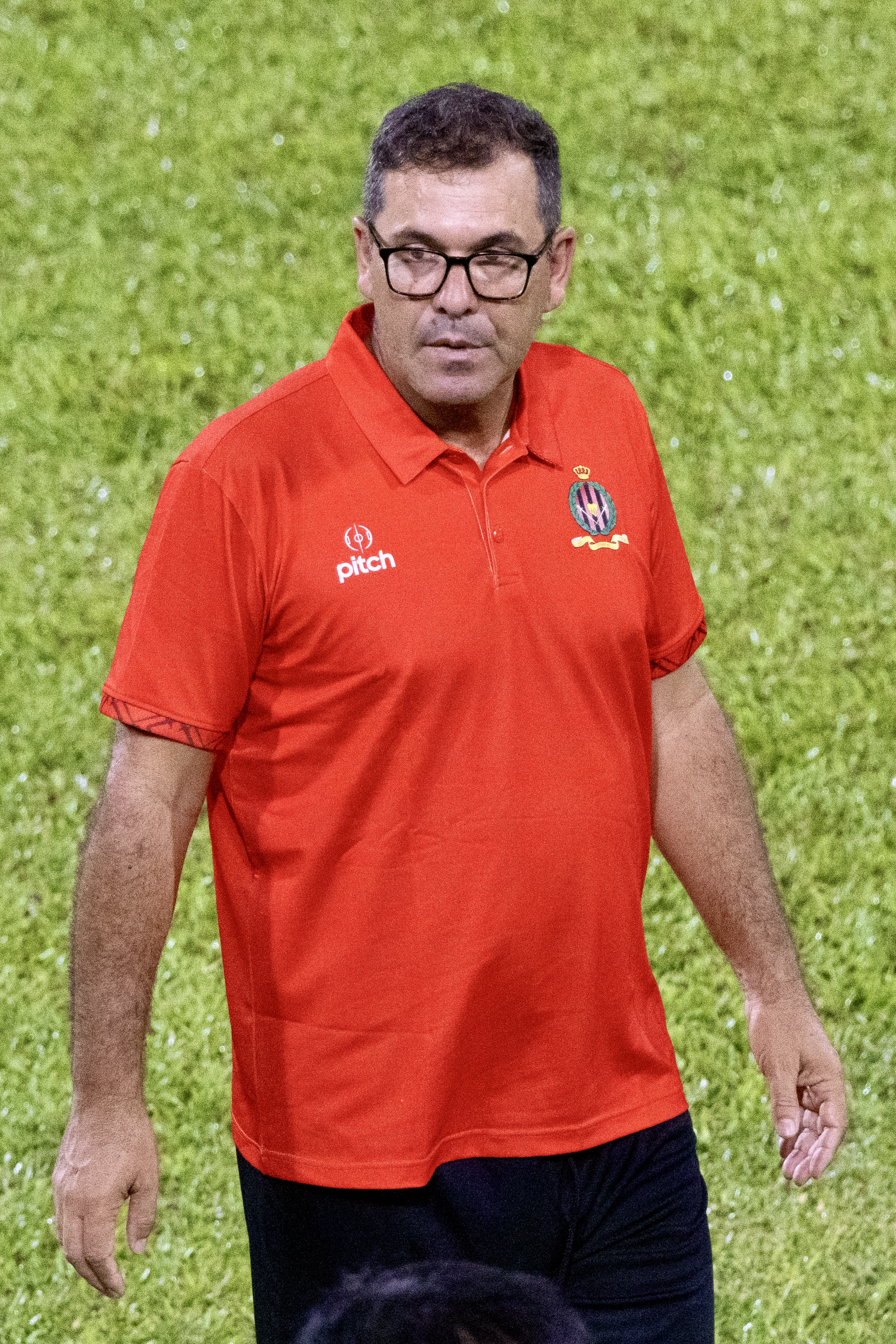
- Capela in 2024

Personal information
- Full name: Rui José Capela Batista
- Date of birth: 6 May 1969 (age 57)
- Place of birth: Beja, Portugal

Managerial career
- Years: Team
- 2004–2005: Lagoa (technical director)
- 2006–2007: Portimonense (technical director)
- 2007–2010: Esperança Lagos (technical director)
- 2011–2013: 3 de Febrero
- 2014: Mohammedan SC
- 2014–2015: Wydad AC (technical director)
- 2015: Kruoja Pakruojis
- 2015–2021: Al-Khor (assistant manager)
- 2022: Esperança Lagos
- 2023: 1. SC Znojmo
- 2023: Salam Zgharta
- 2024: DPMM
- 2024: Brunei

Rui José Capela Batista (born 6 May 1969) is a Portuguese football coach and former player whose last appointment was the head coach of Bruneian club DPMM playing in the Singapore Premier League.

== Biography ==
Capela was born on 6 May 1969, in Beja. As a football player, he played for several clubs until he ended his career at the age of 32 due to injury. He was an international player for the Portugal national team in the U16 and U18 categories and played under the guidance of Carlos Queiroz in the national team.

== Managerial career ==
After retiring from his career as a football player, Capela went on to work as technical director in the Algarve region for club like Quarteirense, Grupo Desportivo Lagoa, Portimonense and Esperança Lagos until 2010.

=== 3 de Febrero ===
Capela finished his first level degree as a coach at the National School of Physical Education in Paraguay in 2011, where he joined 3 de Febrero that plays in the second tier league as technical director and won the Paraguayan División Intermedia league title in 2013. He also coached the youth team where he won his first championship as head coach.

=== Mohammedan SC ===
In January 2014, Capela Batista emigrated to Bangladesh to train Mohammedan SC where he won the Bangladesh Federation Cup.

=== Wydad AC ===
In August 2014, Capela joined Morocco side Wydad AC, and returned to the role of technical director where he steered the club to win the 2014–15 Botola title.

=== Kruoja Pakruojis ===
On 15 February 2015, Capela joined Lithuanian side FK Kruoja Pakruojis as head coach. After leaving the club, he went on to complete his level 4 UEFA Pro License.

=== Al-Khor ===
In August 2015, Capela signed for Qatar's Al-Khor where he started by training the B team and also manages the U23 team. He renewed his contract with the club in May 2016. In February 2019, Capela was promoted to assistant manager to the main team at Al-Khor.

During the 2019–20 season, Capela aggregated the functions of managers for the U23 and U19 team. In May 2020, Al-Khor U19 were crowned national champions.

=== 1. SC Znojmo ===
On 25 February 2023, Capela joined Czech club 1. SC Znojmo FK as a head coach ahead of the 2022–23 season.

=== DPMM and Brunei national team ===
In January 2024, Capela was announced by DPMM as their head coach ahead of their 2024–25 Singapore Premier League season campaign. While managing the professional club side, he was given an opportunity to coach the Brunei national football team in June 2024. He ended his short tenure with two victories in as many games, both against Sri Lanka. He abruptly left the club in early July due to personal reasons.

== Honours ==
Club Atlético 3 de Febrero

- U18 Championship: 2011
- Paraguayan División Intermedia: 2013

Mohammedan SC

- Bangladesh Federation Cup: 2014

Wydad AC

- Botola: 2014–15

Al-Khor

- Qatar U19 Championship: 2019–20
