= 2026–27 DPMM FC season =

22nd season in existence of DPMM FC

DPMM FC
2026–27 season
- Chairman: HRH Prince Al-Muhtadee Billah
- Head coach: (Scotland) Jamie McAllister
- Stadium: Hassanal Bolkiah National Stadium
- Malaysia Super League: TBD
- Malaysia FA Cup: Semi-finals
- Malaysia Cup: TBD
- Top goalscorer: League: Dalberto (5); All: Jordan Murray (8)
- Biggest win: Terengganu 1–3 DPMM (16 September 2026); DPMM 3–1 Negeri Sembilan (30 October 2026)
- Biggest defeat: JDT 6–1 DPMM (8 November 2026)

The 2026–27 season is DPMM FC's 22nd season overall in the history of the club. They are competing in the 2026–27 Malaysia Super League, their second season in the Malaysian top flight after leaving the Singapore Premier League in 2025.

Jamie McAllister, in his third season as head coach for DPMM, outlined a top-six target for the 2026–27 season.

== Players ==
=== First-team squad ===
Note: Flags indicate national team as defined under FIFA eligibility rules; some limited exceptions apply. Players may hold more than one non-FIFA nationality.

No.	Pos.	Nation	Player
1	GK	MAS	Samuel Somerville
2	DF	BRU	Syafiq Safiuddin Abdul Shariff
3	DF	MAS	Tommy Mawat Bada (on loan from KL City)
4	DF	GHA	Ebenezer Abban
5	DF	PHI	Amani Aguinaldo
6	DF	SCO	Clark Robertson
7	MF	BRU	Azwan Ali Rahman (Captain)
9	MF	MAS	Danial Asri
10	FW	POR	Miguel Oliveira
11	DF	IDN	Muhammad Toha
12	GK	BRU	Haimie Abdullah Nyaring
13	DF	BRU	Hanif Hamir
14	DF	BRU	Martin Haddy Khallidden

No.	Pos.	Nation	Player
16	MF	BRU	Abdul Hariz Herman
17	FW	BRU	Hakeme Yazid Said
18	FW	GUA	Óscar Santis (on loan from Antigua GFC)
19	DF	BRU	Nur Ikhwan Othman
20	DF	MAS	Nicholas Swirad
21	DF	BRU	Nazry Aiman Azaman
23	DF	BRU	Yura Indera Putera
25	GK	BRU	Ishyra Asmin Jabidi
27	FW	AUS	Jordan Murray
29	FW	MAS	Farris Izdiham Kechik
42	MF	FIN	Felipe Aspegren
94	FW	BRA	Dalberto

=== Second-team squad ===
Note: Flags indicate national team as defined under FIFA eligibility rules; some limited exceptions apply. Players may hold more than one non-FIFA nationality.

No.	Pos.	Nation	Player
1	GK	BRU	Abdul Azeez Elyas
4	DF	BRU	Azrin Danial Yusra
6	MF	BRU	Azwan Saleh
7	MF	BRU	Faturrahman Embran
8	FW	BRU	Abdul Azim Abdul Rasid
9	FW	BRU	Abdul Azizi Ali Rahman
10	FW	BRU	Sahfiq Hidayat Sahrizam
11	MF	BRU	Zainul Ariffin Mahdinee
17	MF	BRU	Prince Abdul Muntaqim (Captain)
18	FW	BRU	Razimie Ramlli
19	MF	BRU	Haziq Naqiuddin Syamra

No.	Pos.	Nation	Player
20	FW	BRA	Kauã Santana
21	DF	BRU	Abdul Aziz Tamit
22	FW	BRA	Jefferson Baiano
25	GK	BRU	Jefri Syafiq Ishak
40	DF	BRU	Amirul Umar Saiful Rizal
41	DF	BRU	Ahmad Mustafa Ahmad Omar
42	DF	BRU	Adi Idham Sazali
47	MF	BRU	Faris Fadillah Saiful Bahari
55	DF	BRU	Azri Danial Yusra
58	GK	BRU	Akmal Hafiy Punggut
60	FW	BRU	Ali Arsyad Alihan

== Coaching staff and management ==
As of 23 August 2026

=== First-team squad ===
Position	Staff
General manager	(Brunei) Ali Momin
Assistant team manager	(Brunei) Rosmin Kamis
Head coach	(Scotland) Jamie McAllister
Assistant head coach	(Brunei) Helme Panjang (Brunei) Moksen Mohammad
Goalkeeper coach	(Brazil) Leandro Silva
Fitness coach	(Czech Republic) Denis Kavan
Kitman	(Brunei) Kasim Amit
Physiotherapists	(Brunei) Abdul Fatah Daud (Brunei) Ahmad Irffan Ahmad Daud
Masseurs	(Brunei) Faisal Hashim (Brunei) Husaini Kahar
Team doctor	(Malaysia) Ahmad Zaeem Hanef Salleh (Malaysia) Gregory Parameswaran Libau (Malaysia) Jauty Kurpong (Brunei) Lai Yuli
Media officer	(Brunei) Abdul Rahman Tamit

=== Second-team squad ===
Position	Name
Team manager	(Brunei) Momin Ja'afar (Brunei) Saharul Nizam Tuah
Head coach	(Brunei) Subhi Bakir
Assistant coach	(Brunei) Mahdini Mohammad (Brunei) Najib Tarif
Goalkeeping coach	(Brunei) Julaihi Domeng
Physiotherapist	(Brunei) Noorman Abdul Rahman
Kitman	(Brunei) Abdul Hafiz Mursadi

== Transfers ==
=== First-team squad ===
==== In ====
Pre-season

Date	Pos.	Player	Transferred from	Ref
5 July 2026	GK	(Malaysia) Samuel Somerville	(Malaysia) Selangor	Free
5 July 2026	DF	(Malaysia) Nicholas Swirad	(Malaysia) Immigration	Free
6 July 2026	FW	(Guatemala) Óscar Santis	(Guatemala) Antigua GFC	Season-long loan
7 July 2026	DF	(Ghana) Ebenezer Abban	(Ghana) Heart of Lions	Free
8 July 2026	DF	(Indonesia) Muhammad Toha	(Indonesia) Persita Tangerang	Free
10 July 2026	MF	(Malaysia) Danial Asri	(Malaysia) Kuching City	Free
10 July 2026	FW	(Malaysia) Farris Izdiham Kechik	(Malaysia) Kelantan TRW	Free
11 July 2026	DF	(Scotland) Clark Robertson	(Scotland) Dundee	Free
20 July 2026	FW	(Brazil) Dalberto	(Indonesia) Arema	Free
22 July 2026	MF	(Finland) Felipe Aspegren	Free agent	Free

==== Out ====
Pre-season

Date	Pos.	Player	Transferred To	Ref
13 May 2026	GK	(Brazil) Michel	(Brazil) Taubaté	Loan return
13 May 2026	DF	(Brunei) Najib Tarif		Retired
13 May 2026	FW	(Indonesia) Ramadhan Sananta	(Indonesia) Persebaya Surabaya	Free
15 May 2026	DF	(Brazil) Jordan Rodrigues	(Syria) Al Ittihad Ahli	Released
15 May 2026	DF	(Malaysia) Fairuz Zakaria	(Malaysia) AAK UNISEL	Released
15 May 2026	MF	(Ghana) Ibrahim Sulley	(Libya) Al-Sadaqa	Released
15 May 2026	FW	(Nigeria) Christian Irobiso	(Kuwait) Sulaibikhat	Released
15 May 2026	FW	(Malaysia) Syafiq Ahmad	(Malaysia) Kuala Lumpur City	Released
18 July 2026	MF	(Ghana) Prosper Boakye	(Ghana) Medeama	Loan return
18 July 2026	MF	(Brunei) Hanif Farhan Azman	(Brunei) MS ABDB	Released
18 July 2026	FW	(Brunei) Hariz Danial Khallidden	(Brunei) MS ABDB	Released
18 July 2026	FW	(Brunei) Nazirrudin Ismail	(Brunei) MS PPDB	Released
18 July 2026	MF	(Brunei) Faturrahman Embran	(Brunei) DPMM II	Reassigned to second team

==== Retained ====
Date	Pos.	Player	Ref
13 May 2026	DF	(Philippines) Amani Aguinaldo	
13 May 2026	FW	(Portugal) Miguel Oliveira	
13 May 2026	DF	(Malaysia) Tommy Mawat Bada	
28 June 2026	FW	(Australia) Jordan Murray	

==== Trialists ====
Pos.	Player	Last club	Ref
FW	(Ghana) Albert Amoah	(Ghana) Asante Kotoko	
MF	(Panama) Ricardo Ávila	(Panama) UMECIT	
FW	(Czech Republic) Daniel Bareš	Austria Salzburg	
FW	(Jamaica) Rohan Brown	(Jamaica) Harbour View	
MF	(Costa Rica) Dylan Flores	(Greece) PAS Giannina	
FW	(Nigeria) Godwin Obaje	(Nigeria) Enugu Rangers	
MF	(Nigeria) Azubuike Okechukwu	(Turkey) Erzurumspor	
MF	(Algeria) Mehdi Abeid	(Saudi Arabia) Al Raed	
MF	(Nigeria) Augustine Oladapo	(Saudi Arabia) Al Wehda	

=== Second-team squad ===
==== In ====
Pre-season

Date	Pos.	Player	Transferred from	Ref
5 September 2026	MF	(Brunei) Faturrahman Embran	First team	Reassigned to second team
5 September 2026	GK	(Brunei) Abdul Azeez Elyas	(Brunei) Indera SC	Free
5 September 2026	DF	(Brunei) Azrin Danial Yusra	(Brunei) Indera SC	Free
5 September 2026	GK	(Brunei) Jefri Syafiq Ishak	(Brunei) Kasuka	Free
5 September 2026	MF	(Brunei) Azwan Saleh	(Brunei) Kasuka	Free
5 September 2026	MF	(Brunei) Haziq Naqiuddin Syamra	(Brunei) Kasuka	Free
5 September 2026	DF	(Brunei) Abdul Aziz Tamit	(Brunei) Kota Ranger	Free
5 September 2026	MF	(Brunei) Zainul Ariffin Mahdinee	(Brunei) Kota Ranger	Free
5 September 2026	FW	(Brunei) Sahfiq Hidayat Sahrizam	(Brunei) Kota Ranger	Free
5 September 2026	FW	(Brunei) Abdul Azim Abdul Rasid	(Brunei) MS PPDB	Free
5 September 2026	FW	(Brazil) Kauã	(Brazil) VOCEM	Free
5 September 2026	FW	(Brazil) Jefferson Baiano	(Brazil) Lagarto	Free
5 September 2026	FW	(Brunei) Abdul Azizi Ali Rahman	Unattached	Free
5 September 2026	FW	(Brunei) Razimie Ramlli	Unattached	Free

== Friendlies ==
=== Preseason ===
2026 Piala Presiden Elite

Pos	Team	Pld	W	D	L	GF	GA	GD	Pts	Qualification
1	(Indonesia) Persib Bandung (H)	3	3	0	0	3	0	+3	9	Advance to the Semi-Final
2	(Indonesia) Arema	3	2	0	1	4	2	+2	6	Advance to the Semi-Final
3	(Singapore) Tampines Rovers	3	0	1	2	3	5	−2	1	
4	(Brunei) DPMM	3	0	1	2	2	5	−3	1	

Source: Piala Presiden 2026
(H) Hosts

Win Draw Loss

25 July 2025	DPMM	2–2	Tampines Rovers	Bandung, Indonesia
16:30 UTC+8	Azwan 47'; Santis 59'		Higashikawa 2'; Faris 71'	Stadium: Si Jalak Harupat Stadium; Referee: Razlan Joffri Ali (Malaysia); Man of the Match: (Brunei) Azwan Ali Rahman

28 July 2025	DPMM	0–1	Persib Bandung	Bandung, Indonesia
20:30 UTC+8			Sekulić 74'	Stadium: Si Jalak Harupat Stadium; Attendance: 20,358; Referee: Candra (Indonesia); Man of the Match: (Brazil) Júlio César

31 July 2025	Arema	2–0	DPMM	Bandung, Indonesia
16:30 UTC+8	Gustavo 35', 45+2'	Report		Stadium: Si Jalak Harupat Stadium; Referee: Razlan Joffri Ali (Malaysia); Man of the Match: (Brazil) Betinho

8 August 2025	DPMM	9–0	MS ABDB	Bandar Seri Begawan, Brunei
16:30 UTC+8	Danial 24'; Santis 30', 67', 72'; Azwan 58'; Dalberto 60', 66'; Farris 75', 90+1'	Report		Stadium: Hassanal Bolkiah National Stadium

15 August 2025	DPMM	4–0	Kasuka	Bandar Seri Begawan, Brunei
16:30 UTC+8	Dalberto 4'; Hariz 34'; Santis 49'; Farris 78'	Report		Stadium: Hassanal Bolkiah National Stadium

== Competitions ==
=== Overview ===
First-team

Competition	First match	Last match	Starting round	Final position	Record							
Competition	First match	Last match	Starting round	Final position	Pld	W	D	L	GF	GA	GD	Win %
Malaysia Super League	23 August 2026	20 November 2026	Matchday 1		7	5	0	2	11	9	+2	71.43
Malaysia FA Cup	9 September 2026	8 November 2026	Round of 16	Semi-finals	6	2	1	3	10	15	−5	33.33
Malaysia Cup	22 January 2027		Round of 16		0	0	0	0	0	0	+0	—
Total					13	7	1	5	21	24	−3	53.85

Source: Competitions

Second team

Competition	First match	Last match	Starting round	Record							
Competition	First match	Last match	Starting round	Pld	W	D	L	GF	GA	GD	Win %
Brunei Super League	12 September 2026	20 November 2026	Week 2	6	6	0	0	42	7	+35	100.00
Total				6	6	0	0	42	7	+35	100.00

Source: Competitions

=== Malaysia Super League ===
Pos	Team	Pld	W	D	L	GF	GA	GD	Pts	Qualification or relegation
1	Johor Darul Ta'zim	6	6	0	0	28	0	+28	18	Qualification for the AFC Champions League Elite league stage
2	Selangor	6	6	0	0	17	4	+13	18	Qualification for the AFC Champions League Two group stage
3	Kuching City	7	5	0	2	19	7	+12	15	
4	DPMM (Note: DPMM cannot qualify for Asian Football Confederation competitions as they are based in Brunei.)	7	5	0	2	11	9	+2	15	
5	Sabah	7	3	1	3	10	8	+2	10	
6	Melaka	7	3	1	3	12	14	−2	10	
7	Star City	7	1	3	3	11	18	−7	6	
8	Kuala Lumpur City (Note: Negeri Sembilan were awarded a 3–0 win and three points after KL City were found to have failed to register enough players.)	6	2	0	4	6	16	−10	6	
9	Negeri Sembilan	7	1	2	4	8	13	−5	5	
10	Terengganu	7	1	2	4	5	11	−6	5	
11	Penang	6	1	1	4	5	10	−5	4	Relegation to Malaysia A1 Semi-Pro League
12	Kelantan Red Warrior	7	1	0	6	8	30	−22	3	Relegation to Malaysia A1 Semi-Pro League

Updated to match(es) played on 21 November 2026. Source: MFL
Rules for classification: 1) Points; 2) Goal difference; 3) Number of goals scored
Notes:

Win Draw Loss

23 August 2026 1	Penang	0–1	DPMM	George Town, Malaysia
17:00		MFL; FAM	Oliveira 63'	Stadium: Penang City Stadium; Attendance: 300; Referee: Afdzal Hilmi Zulkiflee; Man of the Match: (Portugal) Miguel Oliveira

29 August 2026 2	KL City	1–0	DPMM	Cheras, Malaysia
17:30	Paulo Josué 90+3'	MFL; FAM		Stadium: Kuala Lumpur Stadium; Attendance: 513; Referee: Nazri Nasaruddin; Man of the Match: (Malaysia) Paulo Josué

4 September 2026 14 (swapped)	JDT	3–0	DPMM	Iskandar Puteri, Malaysia
20:15	Bérgson 38', 40'; Stoichkov 77'	MFL; FAM		Stadium: Sultan Ibrahim Stadium; Referee: S. Logeswaran; Man of the Match: (Malaysia) Sam Somerville

13 September 2026 4	Sabah	1–2	DPMM	Kota Kinabalu, Malaysia
19:30	di Renzo 25'	MFL; FAM	Abban 12'; Murray 65'	Stadium: Likas Stadium; Referee: Abdul Rahman Wahab; Man of the Match: (Australia) Jordan Murray

18 October 2026 5	DPMM	3–2	Kuching City	Bandar Seri Begawan, Brunei
20:15	Dalberto 6', 67'; Azwan 64'	MFL; FAM	Wenzel-Halls 29', 50'	Stadium: Hassanal Bolkiah National Stadium; Attendance: 4,266; Referee: Zamzaidi Katimin; Man of the Match: (Brazil) Dalberto

30 October 2026 6	DPMM	3–1	Negeri Sembilan	Bandar Seri Begawan, Brunei
16:00	Murray 12'; Dalberto 89'; Santis 90+3'	MFL; FAM	Luqman 34'	Stadium: Hassanal Bolkiah National Stadium; Attendance: 3,000; Referee: Usaid Jamal; Man of the Match: (Australia) Jordan Murray

20 November 2026 7	Terengganu	1–2	DPMM	Gong Badak, Malaysia
21:00	Ruiz 41' (pen.)	MFL; FAM	Dalberto 49', 81'	Stadium: Sultan Mizan Zainal Abidin Stadium; Attendance: 1,000; Referee: S. Logeswaran; Man of the Match: (Malaysia) Sam Somerville

27 November 2026 8	DPMM	v	Kelantan RW	Bandar Seri Begawan, Brunei
				Stadium: Hassanal Bolkiah National Stadium

5 December 2026 9	Selangor	v	DPMM	Petaling Jaya, Malaysia
21:00				Stadium: Petaling Jaya Stadium

13 December 2026 10	DPMM	v	Melaka	Bandar Seri Begawan, Brunei
17:30				Stadium: Hassanal Bolkiah National Stadium

18 December 2026 11	Star City	v	DPMM	Kangar, Malaysia
21:00				Stadium: Tuanku Syed Putra Stadium

3 January 2027 12	DPMM	v	Penang	Bandar Seri Begawan, Brunei
				Stadium: Hassanal Bolkiah National Stadium

9 January 2027 13	Negeri Sembilan	v	DPMM	Paroi, Malaysia
17:00				Stadium: Tuanku Abdul Rahman Stadium

21 February 2027 3 (swapped)	DPMM	v	JDT	Bandar Seri Begawan, Brunei
20:15				Stadium: Hassanal Bolkiah National Stadium

4 March 2027 15	DPMM	v	Star City	Bandar Seri Begawan, Brunei
21:15				Stadium: Hassanal Bolkiah National Stadium

20 March 2027 16	DPMM	v	Sabah	Bandar Seri Begawan, Brunei
20:15				Stadium: Hassanal Bolkiah National Stadium

4 April 2027 17	Kuching City	v	DPMM	Kuching, Malaysia
				Stadium: Sarawak State Stadium

24 April 2027 18	DPMM	v	Selangor	Bandar Seri Begawan, Brunei
				Stadium: Hassanal Bolkiah National Stadium

2 May 2027 19	Melaka	v	DPMM	Krubong, Malaysia
17:30				Stadium: Hang Jebat Stadium

8 May 2027 20	DPMM	v	KL City	Bandar Seri Begawan, Brunei
17:00				Stadium: Hassanal Bolkiah National Stadium

12 May 2027 21	DPMM	v	Terengganu	Bandar Seri Begawan, Brunei
20:15				Stadium: Hassanal Bolkiah National Stadium

TBC 22	Kelantan RW	v	DPMM	Kota Bharu, Malaysia
				Stadium: Sultan Muhammad IV Stadium

=== Malaysia FA Cup ===
9 September 2026 (Note: Match rescheduled due to adverse weather conditions caused by the 2026 Southeast Asian haze) R16	DPMM	2–3	Terengganu	Bandar Seri Begawan, Brunei
20:15	Murray 10', 36'	FAM	Ubaidullah 32', 45+2'; Morales 86'	Stadium: Hassanal Bolkiah National Stadium; Referee: Faizudin Ismail; Man of the Match: (Malaysia) Romel Morales

16 September 2026 R16	Terengganu	1–3 (4–5 agg.)	DPMM	Gong Badak, Malaysia
21:00	Ott 44'	MFL; FAM	Danial 8'; Oliveira 54'; Murray 65'	Stadium: Sultan Mizan Zainal Abidin Stadium; Referee: Hasrol Amir; Man of the Match: (Portugal) Miguel Oliveira

20 September 2026 QF	DPMM	3–3	KL City	Bandar Seri Begawan, Brunei
20:15	Murray 18'; Farris 54'; Oliveira 58'	MFL; FAM	Josué 33' (pen.); Baqiuddin 72'; Sadat 77'	Stadium: Hassanal Bolkiah National Stadium; Attendance: 3,873; Referee: Razlan Joffri Ali; Man of the Match: (Malaysia) Paulo Josué

11 October 2026 QF	KL City	0–1 (3–4 agg.)	DPMM	Cheras, Malaysia
20:15		MFL; FAM	Murray 11'	Stadium: Kuala Lumpur Stadium; Referee: Izzul Fikri Kamaruzaman; Man of the Match: (Australia) Jordan Murray

23 October 2026 SF	DPMM	0–2	JDT	Bandar Seri Begawan, Brunei
20:15		MFL; FAM	Bérgson 21'; Israfilov 72'	Stadium: Hassanal Bolkiah National Stadium; Attendance: 13,063; Referee: Kamil Zakaria Ismail; Man of the Match: (Malaysia) Bérgson

8 November 2026 SF	JDT	6–1 (8–1 agg.)	DPMM	Iskandar Puteri, Malaysia
20:15	Figueiredo 27'; Hidalgo 59'; Arribas 64'; Jairo 66'; Daniesh 88' (pen.); Guilherme 90+3'	MFL; FAM	Murray 49'	Stadium: Sultan Ibrahim Stadium; Referee: Firdaus Dahlan; Man of the Match: (Colombia) Kevin Medina

=== Brunei Super League ===
Pos	Team	Pld	W	D	L	GF	GA	GD	Pts	
1	DPMM II	6	6	0	0	42	7	+35	18	Qualification for the AFC Challenge League qualifying play-offs and 2025–26 ASEAN Club Championship qualifying play-offs
2	Panchor Murai	7	6	0	1	31	7	+24	18	
3	Kasuka	5	5	0	0	32	1	+31	15	
4	Kuala Belait	6	3	0	3	12	15	−3	9	
5	Wijaya	7	3	0	4	12	18	−6	9	

Updated to match(es) played on 21 November 2026. Source: FABD
Rules for classification: 1) Points; 2) Goal difference; 3) Goals scored; 4) Head-to-head result; 5) Head-to-head goal difference; 6) Head-to-head goals scored.

12 September 2026 Week 2	Rimba Star	2–6	DPMM II	Bandar Seri Begawan
20:15 UTC+8	Aaiman 7', 58'	Report	Haziq 22'; Kauã 32', 36'; Jefferson 85', 88', 90+3'	Stadium: Track and Field Sports Complex; Referee: Azlan Jali

9 October 2026 Week 3	DPMM II	4–2	ABDB	Jerudong
20:15 UTC+8	Kauã 10', 70'; Jefferson 45+3'; Sahfiq 82'	Report	Saiful 15' (pen.); Hadif 52'	Stadium: Jerudong Park Mini Stadium; Referee: Adib Suimi

17 October 2026 Week 4	DPMM II	6–0	KB	Jerudong
20:15 UTC+8	Kauã 40', 83'; Sahfiq 52'; Azwan 70', 90+2'; Aziz 77'	Report		Stadium: Jerudong Park Mini Stadium; Referee: Kamarul Ariffin Zaini

25 October 2026 Week 5	Jerudong	1–9	DPMM II	Bandar Seri Begawan
16:00 UTC+8	Fithratul 61'	Report	Kauã 11', 59'; Azizi 45+1'; Jefferson 46', 69', 86'; Azim 47'; Faris 84'; Yansen 89' (o.g.)	Stadium: Track and Field Sports Complex; Referee: Redzam Roslan

8 November 2026 Week 7	Wijaya	2–5	DPMM II	Tutong
16:00 UTC+8	Amirulizam 32'; Azrin 79' (o.g.)		Jefferson 6', 55', 89'; Kauã 44'; Sahfiq 48'	Stadium: Tutong Sports Complex; Referee: Azlan Jali

20 November 2026 Week 8	DPMM II	12–0	Lun Bawang	Jerudong
20:15 UTC+8	Abdul Azim 10', 17', 44', 47'; Azwan 14'; Ehsan 45+1' (o.g.); Razimie 50'; Kauã 69', 81', 90+1'; Faturrahman 85'; Jefferson 89'			Stadium: Jerudong Park Mini Stadium; Referee: Kamarul Ariffin Zaini

25 November 2026 Week 6	DPMM II	v	BSRC	Jerudong
20:15 UTC+8				Stadium: Jerudong Park Mini Stadium

29 November 2026 Week 9	DPMM II	v	Hawa	Jerudong
16:00 UTC+8				Stadium: Jerudong Park Mini Stadium

12 December 2026 Week 11	DPMM	v	Panchor Murai	Jerudong
16:00 UTC+8				Stadium: Jerudong Park Mini Stadium

18 December 2026 Week 12	Indera	v	DPMM II	Bandar Seri Begawan
20:15 UTC+8				Stadium: Track and Field Sports Complex

10 January 2027 Week 13	DPMM II	v	Kasuka	Jerudong
16:00 UTC+8				Stadium: Jerudong Park Mini Stadium

TBA Week 1	PPDB	v	DPMM II	Bandar Seri Begawan
20:15 UTC+8				Stadium: Hassanal Bolkiah National Stadium

== Statistics ==
=== Appearances and goals ===
No.	Pos	Nat	Player	Total		Malaysia Super League		Malaysia FA Cup		Malaysia Cup	
No.	Pos	Nat	Player	Apps	Goals	Apps	Goals	Apps	Goals	Apps	Goals
Goalkeepers
1	GK	(Malaysia) MAS	Sam Somerville	9	0	4	0	5	0	0	0
12	GK	(Brunei) BRU	Haimie Abdullah Nyaring	4	0	3	0	1	0	0	0
25	GK	(Brunei) BRU	Ishyra Asmin Jabidi	0	0	0	0	0	0	0	0
Defenders
2	RB/RM	(Brunei) BRU	Syafiq Safiuddin	5	0	0+3	0	0+2	0	0	0
3	LB	(Malaysia) MAS	Tommy Mawat Bada	11	0	6	0	5	0	0	0
4	CB	(Ghana) GHA	Ebenezer Abban	13	1	6+1	1	6	0	0	0
5	CB	(Philippines) PHI	Amani Aguinaldo	8	0	3+1	0	1+3	0	0	0
6	CB	(Scotland) SCO	Clark Robertson	10	0	5	0	5	0	0	0
11	RB	(Indonesia) IDN	Muhammad Toha	13	0	7	0	6	0	0	0
13	CB	(Brunei) BRU	Hanif Hamir	0	0	0	0	0	0	0	0
14	CB	(Brunei) BRU	Martin Haddy Khallidden	0	0	0	0	0	0	0	0
19	CB/DM	(Brunei) BRU	Nurikhwan Othman	5	0	0+2	0	1+2	0	0	0
20	CB/DM	(Malaysia) MAS	Nick Swirad	7	0	2+3	0	1+1	0	0	0
21	RB/CB	(Brunei) BRU	Nazry Aiman Azaman	3	0	0	0	0+3	0	0	0
23	CB/RB	(Brunei) BRU	Yura Indera Putera	0	0	0	0	0	0	0	0
Midfielders
7	CM	(Brunei) BRU	Azwan Ali Rahman ©	12	1	7	1	5	0	0	0
9	AM/RW	(Malaysia) MAS	Danial Asri	11	1	6	0	5	1	0	0
16	CM	(Brunei) BRU	Abdul Hariz Herman	10	0	1+5	0	0+4	0	0	0
42	CM/RB	(Finland) FIN	Felipe Aspegren	12	0	4+3	0	3+2	0	0	0
Forwards
10	RW/RM	(Portugal) POR	Miguel Oliveira	13	3	7	1	6	2	0	0
17	LW	(Brunei) BRU	Hakeme Yazid Said	10	0	1+4	0	1+4	0	0	0
18	RW	(Guatemala) GUA	Óscar Santis	8	1	2+3	1	0+3	0	0	0
27	CF	(Australia) AUS	Jordan Murray	13	8	4+3	2	6	6	0	0
29	RW	(Malaysia) MAS	Farris Izdiham	13	1	5+2	0	6	1	0	0
94	CF	(Brazil) BRA	Dalberto	11	5	5+1	5	3+2	0	0	0
Players transferred/loaned out during the season

Source: Competitions

=== Assists ===
Rank	No.	Pos.	Nat.	Name	Super League	FA Cup	Malaysia Cup	Total
1	10	FW	(Portugal)	Miguel Oliveira	4	0	0	4
2	29	FW	(Malaysia)	Farris Izdiham	1	2	0	3
2	94	FW	(Brazil)	Dalberto	2	1	0	3
4	6	DF	(Scotland)	Clark Robertson	1	1	0	2
4	7	MF	(Brunei)	Azwan Ali Rahman	1	1	0	2
4	27	FW	(Australia)	Jordan Murray	0	2	0	2
7	4	DF	(Ghana)	Ebenezer Abban	0	1	0	1
7	17	FW	(Brunei)	Hakeme Yazid Said	1	0	0	1
Totals					10	8	0	18

=== Discipline ===
No.	Pos.	Name	Super League			FA Cup			Malaysia Cup			Total		
No.	Pos.	Name	Yellow card	(yellow card) (red card)	Red card	Yellow card	(yellow card) (red card)	Red card	Yellow card	(yellow card) (red card)	Red card	Yellow card	(yellow card) (red card)	Red card
3	DF	(Malaysia) Tommy Mawat Bada	2	1	0	0	0	1	0	0	0	2	1	1
4	DF	(Ghana) Ebenezer Abban	0	0	0	1	0	0	0	0	0	1	0	0
5	DF	(Philippines) Amani Aguinaldo	1	0	0	0	0	0	0	0	0	1	0	0
6	DF	(Scotland) Clark Robertson	1	0	0	0	0	0	0	0	0	1	0	0
7	MF	(Brunei) Azwan Ali Rahman	1	0	0	2	0	0	0	0	0	3	0	0
9	MF	(Malaysia) Danial Asri	2	0	0	1	0	0	0	0	0	3	0	0
10	FW	(Portugal) Miguel Oliveira	1	0	0	0	0	0	0	0	0	1	0	0
11	DF	(Indonesia) Muhammad Toha	1	0	0	1	0	0	0	0	0	2	0	0
18	FW	(Guatemala) Óscar Santis	1	0	0	0	0	0	0	0	0	1	0	0
27	FW	(Australia) Jordan Murray	1	0	0	0	0	0	0	0	0	1	0	0
42	MF	(Finland) Felipe Aspegren	1	0	0	1	0	0	0	0	0	2	0	0
94	FW	(Brazil) Dalberto	0	0	0	1	0	0	0	0	0	1	0	0
	HC	(Scotland) Jamie McAllister	2	1	0	1	0	0	0	0	0	3	1	0
	FC	(Czech Republic) Denis Kavan	0	0	0	1	0	0	0	0	0	1	0	0
Totals			14	2	0	9	0	1	0	0	0	23	2	1
