= 2025–26 DPMM FC season =

21st season in existence of DPMM FC

DPMM FC
2025–26 season
- Chairman: HRH Prince Al-Muhtadee Billah
- Head coach: (Scotland) Jamie McAllister
- Stadium: Hassanal Bolkiah National Stadium
- Malaysia Super League: 10th out of 13
- Malaysia FA Cup: Round of 16
- Malaysia Cup: Quarter-finals
- Top goalscorer: League: Jordan Murray (9); All: Jordan Murray (10)
- Highest home attendance: 10,200 (v. Selangor, 10 January 2026)
- Lowest home attendance: 1,500 (v. Immigration, 7 December 2025)
- Average home league attendance: 4,360
- Biggest win: Kelantan TRW 0–3 DPMM (27 February 2026)
- Biggest defeat: JDT 10–0 DPMM (25 October 2025)
Home colours	Away colours

The 2025–26 season was DPMM FC's 21st season overall in the history of the club. They were competing in the Malaysia Super League for the first time since the 2007–08 season, leaving the Singapore Premier League. They also competed in the Malaysia FA Cup and Malaysia Cup, exiting in the round of 16 and the quarter-finals respectively.

In the club's youth department, the under-15s finished fourth in the Brunei U15 Youth League in September, while the under-18s captained by Prince Abdul Muntaqim became champions of the U18 Youth League in January.

DPMM ended their season in tenth place out of 13 teams.

== Players ==
=== First-team squad ===
Note: Flags indicate national team as defined under FIFA eligibility rules; some limited exceptions apply. Players may hold more than one non-FIFA nationality.

No.	Pos.	Nation	Player
2	FW	BRU	Syafiq Safiuddin Abdul Shariff
3	DF	MAS	Tommy Mawat Bada
4	MF	BRU	Hanif Farhan Azman
5	DF	PHI	Amani Aguinaldo
6	DF	BRA	Jordan Rodrigues
7	MF	BRU	Azwan Ali Rahman (Captain)
8	MF	BRU	Faturrahman Embran
9	FW	IDN	Ramadhan Sananta
10	FW	POR	Miguel Oliveira
11	DF	BRU	Najib Tarif
12	GK	BRU	Haimie Abdullah Nyaring
13	DF	BRU	Hanif Hamir
14	DF	BRU	Martin Haddy Khallidden
15	FW	BRU	Hariz Danial Khallidden

No.	Pos.	Nation	Player
16	MF	BRU	Abdul Hariz Herman
17	FW	BRU	Hakeme Yazid Said
18	DF	MAS	Fairuz Zakaria
19	MF	BRU	Nur Ikhwan Othman
20	MF	GHA	Prosper Boakye Owusu (on loan from Medeama)
21	DF	BRU	Nazry Aiman Azaman
22	FW	BRU	Nazirrudin Ismail
23	DF	BRU	Yura Indera Putera
24	GK	BRA	Michel (on loan from Taubaté)
25	GK	BRU	Ishyra Asmin Jabidi
26	MF	GHA	Ibrahim Sulley
27	FW	AUS	Jordan Murray
28	FW	MAS	Syafiq Ahmad
30	FW	NGR	Christian Irobiso

=== U18 squad ===
Note: Flags indicate national team as defined under FIFA eligibility rules; some limited exceptions apply. Players may hold more than one non-FIFA nationality.

No.	Pos.	Nation	Player
1	GK	BRU	Akmal Hakeem Shamsuddin
2	DF	BRU	Aiman Qushairi Azmir Zaxquarim
4	DF	BRU	Haikal Rizwan Aliuddin
5	DF	BRU	Akmal Hanif Azemy
6	MF	BRU	Amirul Umar Saiful Rizal
7	MF	BRU	Harith Aqil Azaman
8	MF	BRU	Faris Fadillah Saiful Bahari
9	FW	SWE	Yunus Poljarevic
10	MF	BRU	Hanif Yusuf Shahrildin
11	FW	BRU	Hafiy Hakim Azizan
12	GK	BRU	Akmal Hafiy Punggut
13	DF	BRU	Musa Maliki Nirwan

No.	Pos.	Nation	Player
14	DF	BRU	Akmal Asyraaf Puasa
15	DF	BRU	Azri Danial Yusra
16	DF	BRU	Ahmad Mustafa Ahmad Omar
17	MF	BRU	Prince Abdul Muntaqim
19	DF	BRU	Adi Idham Sazali
20	DF	BRU	Darwishafis Hamzillah
21	MF	BRU	Ali Arsyad Alihan
22	MF	BRU	Akmal Rizal Abu Bakar
23	DF	BRU	Safwan Ikhwan Safiuddin Jasri
24	DF	BRU	Mahmud Khalish Zaifulizham
25	GK	BRU	Azdi Azri

== Coaching staff and management ==
As of 17 January 2026

=== Senior squad ===
Position	Staff
Team manager	(Brunei) Ali Momin
Assistant team manager	(Brunei) Rosmin Kamis
Head coach	(Scotland) Jamie McAllister
Assistant head coach	(Brunei) Helme Panjang (Brunei) Moksen Mohammad
Goalkeeper coach	(Brazil) Leandro Silva
Fitness coach	(Czech Republic) Denis Kavan (Brunei) Ameer Lani
Kitman	(Brunei) Kasim Amit
Physiotherapist	(Brunei) Faisal Hashim
Masseur	(Brunei) Husaini Kahar
Team doctors	(Brunei) Long Shi Ying (Malaysia) Nurabrar Hussin (Malaysia) Gregory Parameswaran Libau (Malaysia) Jauty Kurpong (Brunei) Lai Yuli (Malaysia) Ahmad Zaeem Hanef Salleh
Media officer	(Brunei) Abdul Rahman Tamit

=== U18 squad ===
Position	Name
Team manager	(Brunei) Saharul Nizam Tuah
Head coach	(Brunei) Subhi Abdillah Bakir
Assistant coach	(Brunei) Mahdini Mohammad
Goalkeeping coach	(Brunei) Julaihi Domeng
Physiotherapist	(Brunei) Noorman Abdul Rahman
Kitman	(Brunei) Abdul Hafiz Mursadi

== Transfers ==
=== In ===
Preseason

Date	Pos.	Player	Transferred from	Ref
First team
19 May 2025	FW	(Indonesia) Ramadhan Sananta	(Indonesia) Persis Solo	Free
20 May 2025	DF	(Malaysia) Fairuz Zakaria	(Malaysia) Penang	Free
7 June 2025	DF	(Philippines) Amani Aguinaldo	(Thailand) Rayong	Free
8 June 2025	DF	(Malaysia) Tommy Mawat Bada	(Malaysia) Perak	Free
8 July 2025	GK	(Brazil) Michel	(Brazil) Taubaté	Six-month loan
17 July 2025	FW	(Malaysia) Syafiq Ahmad	(Malaysia) Johor DT	Free
18 July 2025	MF	(Ghana) Prosper Boakye Owusu	(Ghana) Medeama	Season-long loan
18 July 2025	DF	(Brazil) Jordan Rodrigues	(Brazil) Taubaté	Free
3 August 2025	FW	(Australia) Jordan Murray	(India) Jamshedpur	Free
5 August 2025	DF	(Brunei) Martin Haddy Khallidden	(Brunei) DPMM FC II	Promoted to first team

Mid-season

Date	Pos.	Player	Transferred from	Ref
	GK	(Brazil) Michel	(Brazil) Taubaté	Loan extension
5 January 2026	MF	(Ghana) Ibrahim Sulley	Free agent	Free
5 January 2026	FW	(Nigeria) Christian Irobiso	Free agent	Free

=== Out ===
Preseason

Date	Pos.	Player	Transferred To	Ref
First team
7 June 2025	DF	(Iceland) Damir Muminovic	(Iceland) Breiðablik	Free
16 June 2025	FW	(Latvia) Dāvis Ikaunieks	(Latvia) FK RFS	Free
5 July 2025	MF	(Brunei) Azwan Saleh	(Brunei) Kasuka	Free
5 July 2025	DF	(Brunei) Abdul Mu'iz Sisa	(Brunei) Kasuka	Free
5 July 2025	DF	(Brunei) Wafi Aminuddin	(Brunei) Kasuka	Free
5 July 2025	MF	(Brunei) Na'im Tarif	(Brunei) MS PPDB	Free
28 October 2025	MF	(Brazil) Gabriel Gama	(Qatar) Mesaimeer SC	Free
Second team
	GK	(Brunei) Jefri Syafiq Ishak	(Brunei) Kasuka	Team disbanded
	GK	(Brunei) Wa'ie Haziq Wardun	(Brunei) Kasuka	Team disbanded
	MF	(Brunei) Haziq Naqiuddin Syamra	(Brunei) Kasuka	Team disbanded
	GK	(Brunei) Khairul Hisyam Norihwan	(Brunei) Indera	Team disbanded
	DF	(Brunei) Azrin Danial Yusra	(Brunei) Indera	Team disbanded
	DF	(Brunei) Irfan Abdullah Ikhwan Chin	(Brunei) Indera	Team disbanded
	MF	(Brunei) Abdul Raziq Saiful Faisal	(Brunei) Indera	Team disbanded
	MF	(Brunei) Hadi Aiman Hamizal	(Brunei) Indera	Team disbanded
	MF	(Brunei) Akram Waqeel Bakri	(Brunei) Indera	Team disbanded
	FW	(Brunei) Al-Kholil Sapawi	(Brunei) Indera	Team disbanded
	DF	(Brunei) Danish Firdaus Roddy Suhardy	(Brunei) Wijaya	Team disbanded
	DF	(Brunei) Adrian Zikry Nor Khairi		Team disbanded
	MF	(Brunei) Safwan Zawawi Sazalee		Team disbanded
	FW	(Brunei) Adrian Zizry Nor Khairi		Team disbanded
	FW	(Brunei) Abdul Azizi Ali Rahman	Retired	Team disbanded
	FW	(Brunei) Shah Razen Said	Retired	Team disbanded
2 August 2025	MF	(Spain) Matías Hernández	(India) Gokulam Kerala	Free
30 August 2025	MF	(Japan) Kenshin Uneo		Retired
8 September 2025	DF	(Brazil) Marcelinho Junior	(Mongolia) Central Stallions	Free
15 September 2025	FW	(Spain) Sergio Mendigutxia	(Maldives) Maziya	Free

Mid-season

Date	Pos.	Player	Transferred To	Ref
	GK	(Brunei) Abdul Azeez Elyas	(Brunei) Indera SC	Free
31 December 2025	GK	(North Macedonia) Kristijan Naumovski	(North Macedonia) FK Skopje	Free
17 January 2026	MF	(Afghanistan) Farshad Noor	(Cyprus) Spartakos Kitiou	Free

=== Trialists ===
Pos.	Player	Last club	Ref
DF	(Malaysia) V. Ruventhiran	(Malaysia) Selangor	
DF	(Malaysia) Annil Vigneswaran	(Germany) SV Waldhof Mannheim	
MF	(Malaysia) R. Kogileswaran	(Malaysia) Bunga Raya	
MF	(Malaysia) Sean Selvaraj	(Malaysia) Sri Pahang	
FW	(Malaysia) Rahmat Makasuf	(Malaysia) Penang	
MF	(Bolivia) Omar Siles	(Bolivia) Real Tomayapo	
FW	(Scotland) Scott Allardice	(Scotland) Ross County	
FW	(Nigeria) Chijioke Akuneto	(Nigeria) Enyimba	
FW	(Spain) Víctor Bertomeu	(Hong Kong) Eastern	
MF	(France) Ousmane Fané	(Indonesia) Persik Kediri	
FW	(Nigeria) Benjamin Kuku	(Vietnam) Song Lam Nghe An	
DF	(England) Tyler Blackett	(England) Rotherham United	
GK	(Estonia) Eloy Room	(Belgium) Cercle Brugge	
MF	(England) Josh Onomah	(England) Blackpool	
MF	(Malaysia) Arif Shaqirin	(Malaysia) Kuala Lumpur City	
MF	(Malaysia) Azalinullah Alias	(Malaysia) Perak	
MF	(Malaysia) J. Partiban	(Malaysia) Kuala Lumpur City	

== Friendlies ==
Preseason Win Draw Loss

10 July 2025	DPMM	4–1	Brunei U23	Jerudong, Brunei
16:15 UTC+8				Stadium: Jerudong Park Mini Stadium

26 July 2025	Sabah	3–1	DPMM	Kota Kinabalu, Malaysia
20:00 UTC+8	Ting 11', 71'; Cifuentes 31'		Jordan 57'	Stadium: Likas Stadium

27 July 2025	Sabah	1–2	DPMM	Kota Kinabalu, Malaysia
16:00 UTC+8			Sananta	Stadium: Padang Boling Likas; Attendance: 0

1 August 2025	DPMM	3–0	Sumsel United	Jerudong, Brunei
16:15 UTC+8				Stadium: Jerudong Park Mini Stadium

2 August 2025	DPMM	5–0	Sumsel United	Bandar Seri Begawan, Brunei
20:15 UTC+8	Sananta 20', 75'; Oliveira 24'; Azwan 31'; Bertomeu 37'	Report		Stadium: Hassanal Bolkiah National Stadium

== Competitions ==
=== Overview ===
Competition	First match	Last match	Starting round	Final position	Record							
Competition	First match	Last match	Starting round	Final position	Pld	W	D	L	GF	GA	GD	Win %
Malaysia Super League	9 August 2025	15 May 2026	Matchday 1	10th	24	6	5	13	30	57	−27	25.00
Malaysia FA Cup	16 August 2025	14 September 2025	Round of 16	Round of 16	2	1	0	1	4	9	−5	50.00
Malaysia Cup	17 January 2026	14 February 2026	Round of 16	Quarter-finals	4	1	1	2	5	7	−2	25.00
Total					30	8	6	16	39	73	−34	26.67

Source: Competitions

=== Malaysia Super League ===
Pos	Team	Pld	W	D	L	GF	GA	GD	Pts	Qualification or relegation
8	Penang	24	6	7	11	26	41	−15	25	
9	Sabah	24	5	8	11	29	44	−15	23	
10	DPMM	24	6	5	13	30	57	−27	23	Ineligible for AFC competition spots
11	Melaka	24	4	7	13	18	45	−27	19	
12	Kelantan The Real Warriors (Note: Kelantan The Real Warriors failed to meet requirements for MFL club licensing approval.)	24	4	3	17	17	63	−46	15	Ejected from Malaysian Super League

Updated to match(es) played on 17 May 2026. Source: Malaysian Football League
Rules for classification: 1) Points; 2) Goal difference; 3) Number of goals scored.
Notes:

Win Draw Loss

9 August 2025 1	PDRM	2–2	DPMM	Selayang, Malaysia
21:00	Park 68', 72'	MFL; FAM	Sananta 3'; Oliveira 6'	Stadium: Selayang Municipal Council Stadium; Attendance: 220; Referee: Nawal Zubir; Man of the Match: (South Korea) Park Tae-soo

12 August 2025 2	Selangor	3–0	DPMM	Petaling Jaya, Malaysia
21:00	Deeromram 5', 36'; Chrigor 67'	MFL; FAM		Stadium: Petaling Jaya Stadium; Attendance: 4,260; Referee: Ahmad Zuhadi Dzulkifli; Man of the Match: (North Macedonia) Kristijan Naumovski

22 August 2025 3	DPMM	0–5	Terengganu	Bandar Seri Begawan, Brunei
20:15		MFL; FAM	Careca 1', 75' (pen.); Tukhtasinov 16'; Mabella 86'; Syahmi 90+2'	Stadium: Hassanal Bolkiah National Stadium; Attendance: 5,425; Referee: Azharudin Abdullah; Man of the Match: (Brazil) Careca

22 September 2025 5	DPMM	0–4	KL City	Bandar Seri Begawan, Brunei
20:15		MFL; FAM	Yura 25' (o.g.); Ruiz 56'; Safawi 64', 84'	Stadium: Hassanal Bolkiah National Stadium; Attendance: 3,200; Referee: Izzul Fikri Kamaruzaman; Man of the Match: (Malaysia) Safawi Rasid

26 September 2025 18 (swapped)	DPMM	1–2	Kelantan TRW	Bandar Seri Begawan, Brunei
21:15	Jordan 52'	MFL; FAM	Olusegun 38'; Nor Azam 42'	Stadium: Hassanal Bolkiah National Stadium; Attendance: 2,800; Referee: Afiq Naim; Man of the Match: (Malaysia) Azfar Arif Sukri

30 September 2025 4 (rescheduled)	Melaka	0–1	DPMM	Krubong, Malaysia
20:15		MFL; FAM	Murray 37' (pen.)	Stadium: Hang Jebat Stadium; Attendance: 723; Referee: Zam Azwan Khan Rashid Khan; Man of the Match: (Brunei) Haimie Abdullah Nyaring

25 October 2025 7	JDT	10–0	DPMM	Iskandar Puteri, Malaysia
20:15	Bérgson 9', 35' (pen.), 37', 73'; Arribas 45'; Hidalgo 56'; Yura 63' (o.g.); Arif Aiman 68'; Jairo 81'; Morales 88'	MFL; FAM		Stadium: Sultan Ibrahim Stadium; Attendance: 13,001; Referee: Ahmad Zuhadi Dzulkifli; Man of the Match: (Brazil) Bergson

2 November 2025 8	DPMM	2–2	Negeri Sembilan	Bandar Seri Begawan, Brunei
20:15	Murray 62' (pen.), 81' (pen.)	MFL; FAM	Esso 54'; Motika 65'	Stadium: Hassanal Bolkiah National Stadium; Attendance: 2,100; Referee: Fusser Mad Sallih; Man of the Match: (Australia) Jordan Murray

22 November 2025 9	Kuching City	1–0	DPMM	Kuching, Malaysia
20:15	Ramadhan 69'	MFL; FAM		Stadium: Sarawak State Stadium; Referee: Syed Fazeel Shah Syed Anwar Shah; Man of the Match: (Namibia) Petrus Shitembi

7 December 2025 10	DPMM	4–2	Immigration	Bandar Seri Begawan, Brunei
20:15	Azwan 16'; Hakeme 21', 27'; Oliveira 86'	MFL; FAM	Jordán 5', 71' (pen.)	Stadium: Hassanal Bolkiah National Stadium; Attendance: 1,500; Referee: Zamzaidi Katimin; Man of the Match: (Portugal) Miguel Oliveira

20 December 2025 11	Sabah	1–3	DPMM	Kota Kinabalu, Malaysia
19:30	Mujagić 76'	MFL; FAM	Sananta 20'; Tommy 75'; Azwan 86'	Stadium: Likas Stadium; Referee: Firdaus Dahlan; Man of the Match: (Brunei) Azwan Ali Rahman

23 December 2025 12	DPMM	2–0	Penang	Bandar Seri Begawan, Brunei
20:15	Murray 18'; Azwan 23'	MFL; FAM		Stadium: Hassanal Bolkiah National Stadium; Attendance: 3,500; Referee: Nasruddin Tamrin; Man of the Match: (Brunei) Azwan Ali Rahman

3 January 2026 13	DPMM	3–1	PDRM	Bandar Seri Begawan, Brunei
20:15	Hakeme 46', 87'; Murray 63'	MFL; FAM	Fakhrul 85'	Stadium: Hassanal Bolkiah National Stadium; Attendance: 4,125; Referee: Firdaus Dahlan; Man of the Match: (Brunei) Hakeme Yazid Said

10 January 2026 14	DPMM	2–5	Selangor	Bandar Seri Begawan, Brunei
20:15	Hakeme 42'; Oliveira 62'	MFL; FAM	Chrigor 5', 10', 58', 90+1'; Laine 48'	Stadium: Hassanal Bolkiah National Stadium; Attendance: 10,200; Referee: Faizudin Ismail; Man of the Match: (Brazil) Chrigor

13 January 2026 15	Terengganu	1–0	DPMM	Gong Badak, Malaysia
21:00	Shakir 43'	MFL; FAM		Stadium: Sultan Mizan Zainal Abidin Stadium; Referee: Izwan Abdullah; Man of the Match: (Malaysia) Akhyar Rashid

31 January 2026 16	DPMM	1–1	Melaka	Bandar Seri Begawan, Brunei
20:15	Syafiq A. 27'	MFL; FAM	Shamsaldin 53'	Stadium: Hassanal Bolkiah National Stadium; Attendance: 3,247; Referee: Azharudin Abdullah; Man of the Match: (Portugal) Miguel Oliveira

22 February 2026 17	KL City	4–0	DPMM	Cheras, Malaysia
22:00	Safawi 9', 18'; Josué 61'; Ruiz 70'	MFL; FAM		Stadium: Kuala Lumpur Stadium; Referee: Syed Fazeel Shah Syed Anwar Shah; Man of the Match: (Malaysia) Safawi Rasid

27 February 2026 6 (swapped)	Kelantan TRW	0–3	DPMM	Selayang, Malaysia
22:00		MFL; FAM	Murray 12'; Syafiq A. 23'; Jordan 69'	Stadium: Selayang Municipal Council Stadium; Attendance: 127; Referee: Firdaus Dahlan; Man of the Match: (Australia) Jordan Murray

15 March 2026 19	DPMM	0–3	JDT	Bandar Seri Begawan, Brunei
21:30		MFL; FAM	Aketxe 33'; Arribas 74'; Guilherme 77'	Stadium: Hassanal Bolkiah National Stadium; Attendance: 10,021; Referee: Nasruddin Tamrin; Man of the Match: (Malaysia) Syihan Hazmi

12 April 2026 20	Negeri Sembilan	2–2	DPMM	Paroi, Malaysia
21:00	Sasaki 31'; Esso 73'	MFL; FAM	Irobiso 49'; Hakeme 61'	Stadium: Tuanku Abdul Rahman Stadium; Attendance: 1,549; Referee: Khairulsyahmi Ahmad Khalidi; Man of the Match: (Brunei) Haimie Abdullah Nyaring

25 April 2026 21	DPMM	2–2	Kuching City	Bandar Seri Begawan, Brunei
20:15	Rodrigues 25'; Murray 30'	MFL; FAM	Danial 6'; Mintah 90+6'	Stadium: Hassanal Bolkiah National Stadium; Attendance: 3,427; Referee: Yaasin Hanafiah; Man of the Match: (Brunei) Haimie Abdullah Nyaring

3 May 2026 22	Immigration	3–1	DPMM	Kangar, Malaysia
21:00	Jordán 13'; Fadzrul Danel 51'; Fayadh 89'	MFL; FAM	Murray 10'	Stadium: Tuanku Syed Putra Stadium; Attendance: 500; Referee: Zamzaidi Katimin; Man of the Match: (Malaysia) Fayadh Zulkifli

9 May 2026 23	DPMM	0–1	Sabah	Bandar Seri Begawan, Brunei
20:15		MFL; FAM	Gabriel 90+2' (pen.)	Stadium: Hassanal Bolkiah National Stadium; Attendance: 2,730; Referee: Nawal Zubir; Man of the Match: (Malaysia) Damien Lim

15 May 2026 24	Penang	2–1	DPMM	George Town, Malaysia
17:00	Wenzel-Halls 58'; Brundo 83'	MFL; FAM	Murray 41'	Stadium: City Stadium; Attendance: 500; Referee: Fusser Mad Sallih; Man of the Match: (Malaysia) Adib Raop

=== Malaysia FA Cup ===
16 August 2025 R16	DPMM	3–2	Kuching City	Bandar Seri Begawan, Brunei
20:15	Azwan 5'; Oliveira 49'; Murray 79'	MFL; FAM	Ngah 43'; Okwuosa 47'	Stadium: Hassanal Bolkiah National Stadium; Attendance: 3,996; Referee: Yaasin Hanafiah; Man of the Match: (North Macedonia) Kristijan Naumovski

14 September 2025 R16	Kuching City	7–1 (9–4 agg.)	DPMM	Kuching, Malaysia
20:15	Ngah 2', 53'; Danial 13', 78'; Yura 45+1' (o.g.); Ramadhan 59'; João Pedro 90+2'	MFL; FAM	Sananta 58'	Stadium: Sarawak State Stadium; Referee: Fusser Mad Sallih; Man of the Match: (Cameroon) Ronald Ngah

=== Malaysia Cup ===
17 January 2026 R16	Kelantan RW	0–2	DPMM	Kota Bharu, Malaysia
21:00		MFL; FAM	Sananta 31'; Syafiq A. 90+4'	Stadium: Sultan Muhammad IV Stadium; Attendance: 2,449; Referee: Kamil Zakaria Ismail; Man of the Match: (Malaysia) Syafiq Ahmad

24 January 2026 R16	DPMM	1–1 (3–1 agg.)	Kelantan RW	Bandar Seri Begawan, Brunei
20:00	Hakeme 11'	MFL; FAM	Latiff 8'	Stadium: Hassanal Bolkiah National Stadium; Referee: Ahmad Zuhadi Dzulkifli; Man of the Match: (Brunei) Hakeme Yazid Said

7 February 2026 QF	DPMM	1–3	Kuching City	Bandar Seri Begawan, Brunei
20:15	Okwuosa 50' (o.g.)	MFL; FAM	Etame 39'; Haimie 64' (o.g.); Ramadhan 83'	Stadium: Hassanal Bolkiah National Stadium; Attendance: 4,767; Referee: Afdzal Hilmi Zulkiflee; Man of the Match: (Brunei) Haimie Abdullah Nyaring

14 February 2026 QF	Kuching City	3–1 (6–2 agg.)	DPMM	Kuching, Malaysia
20:15	Ngah 28'; Okwuosa 43'; Gabriel 69'	MFL; FAM	Hakeme 52'	Stadium: Sarawak State Stadium; Referee: Faizal Talib; Man of the Match: (Namibia) Petrus Shitembi

== Statistics ==
=== Appearances and goals ===
No.	Pos	Nat	Player	Total		Malaysia Super League		Malaysia FA Cup		Malaysia Cup	
No.	Pos	Nat	Player	Apps	Goals	Apps	Goals	Apps	Goals	Apps	Goals
Goalkeepers
12	GK	(Brunei) BRU	Haimie Abdullah Nyaring	23	0	19	0	0	0	4	0
24	GK	(Brazil) BRA	Michel	4	0	2+2	0	0	0	0	0
25	GK	(Brunei) BRU	Ishyra Asmin Jabidi	0	0	0	0	0	0	0	0
Defenders
2	RB/RM	(Brunei) BRU	Syafiq Safiuddin	6	0	1+5	0	0	0	0	0
3	LB	(Malaysia) MAS	Tommy Mawat Bada	25	1	19	1	1+1	0	4	0
5	CB	(Philippines) PHI	Amani Aguinaldo	26	0	22	0	1	0	3	0
6	CB	(Brazil) BRA	Jordan Rodrigues	28	3	22	3	2	0	4	0
11	LB/CB	(Brunei) BRU	Najib Tarif	2	0	0+2	0	0	0	0	0
13	CB	(Brunei) BRU	Hanif Hamir	2	0	0+1	0	0+1	0	0	0
14	CB	(Brunei) BRU	Martin Haddy Khallidden	1	0	0+1	0	0	0	0	0
18	RB/LB	(Malaysia) MAS	Fairuz Zakaria	25	0	11+8	0	2	0	2+2	0
19	CB/DM	(Brunei) BRU	Nurikhwan Othman	8	0	1+6	0	0+1	0	0	0
21	RB/CB	(Brunei) BRU	Nazry Aiman Azaman	9	0	2+5	0	1+1	0	0	0
23	CB/RB	(Brunei) BRU	Yura Indera Putera	23	0	14+4	0	2	0	3	0
Midfielders
4	DM/LB	(Brunei) BRU	Hanif Farhan Azman	18	0	7+7	0	1+1	0	0+2	0
7	CM	(Brunei) BRU	Azwan Ali Rahman ©	24	4	17+1	3	2	1	4	0
8	AM/SS	(Brunei) BRU	Faturrahman Embran	3	0	0+3	0	0	0	0	0
16	CM	(Brunei) BRU	Abdul Hariz Herman	13	0	2+10	0	0	0	0+1	0
20	DM	(Ghana) GHA	Prosper Boakye	27	0	20+1	0	2	0	4	0
26	CM	(Ghana) GHA	Ibrahim Sulley	14	0	7+3	0	0	0	0+4	0
Forwards
9	CF	(Indonesia) IDN	Ramadhan Sananta	27	4	16+5	2	2	1	3+1	1
10	RW/RM	(Portugal) POR	Miguel Oliveira	26	4	21+1	3	1	1	3	0
15	CF/LM	(Brunei) BRU	Hariz Danial Khallidden	3	0	0+3	0	0	0	0	0
17	LW	(Brunei) BRU	Hakeme Yazid Said	22	8	18	6	0	0	4	2
22	LW/LB	(Brunei) BRU	Nazirrudin Ismail	25	0	5+14	0	1+1	0	0+4	0
27	CF	(Australia) AUS	Jordan Murray	27	10	21+1	9	0+2	1	3	0
28	CF/SS	(Malaysia) MAS	Syafiq Ahmad	24	3	11+7	2	2	0	2+2	1
30	CF	(Nigeria) NGR	Christian Irobiso	10	1	2+5	1	0	0	1+2	0
Players transferred/loaned out during the season
1	GK	(North Macedonia) MKD	Kristijan Naumovski	5	0	3	0	2	0	0	0

Source: Competitions

=== Assists ===
Rank	No.	Pos.	Nat.	Name	Super League	FA Cup	Malaysia Cup	Total
1	27	FW	(Australia)	Jordan Murray	5	0	1	6
2	7	MF	(Brunei)	Azwan Ali Rahman	4	1	0	5
3	10	MF	(Portugal)	Miguel Oliveira	3	0	1	4
4	17	MF	(Brunei)	Hakeme Yazid Said	3	0	0	3
5	9	FW	(Indonesia)	Ramadhan Sananta	1	1	0	2
5	26	MF	(Ghana)	Ibrahim Sulley	2	0	0	2
7	3	DF	(Malaysia)	Tommy Mawat Bada	1	0	0	1
7	20	MF	(Ghana)	Prosper Boakye	1	0	0	1
7	22	FW	(Brunei)	Nazirrudin Ismail	0	1	0	1
7	23	DF	(Brunei)	Yura Indera Putera	0	0	1	1
7	28	FW	(Malaysia)	Syafiq Ahmad	1	0	0	1
Totals					22	3	3	28

=== Discipline ===
No.	Pos.	Name	Super League			FA Cup			Malaysia Cup			Total		
No.	Pos.	Name	Booked	(yellow card) (red card)	Sent off (straight red)	Booked	(yellow card) (red card)	Sent off (straight red)	Booked	(yellow card) (red card)	Sent off (straight red)	Booked	(yellow card) (red card)	Sent off (straight red)
2	DF	(Brunei) Syafiq Safiuddin	1	1	0	0	0	0	0	0	0	1	1	0
3	DF	(Malaysia) Tommy Mawat Bada	4	0	0	0	0	0	1	0	0	5	0	0
4	MF	(Brunei) Hanif Farhan Azman	2	0	1	0	0	0	1	0	0	3	0	1
5	DF	(Philippines) Amani Aguinaldo	4	0	0	0	0	0	2	0	0	6	0	0
6	DF	(Brazil) Jordan Rodrigues	3	0	1	1	0	1	0	0	0	4	0	2
7	MF	(Brunei) Azwan Ali Rahman	3	0	0	1	0	0	2	0	0	6	0	0
9	FW	(Indonesia) Ramadhan Sananta	1	0	1	0	0	0	0	0	0	1	0	1
10	FW	(Portugal) Miguel Oliveira	3	1	0	0	0	0	2	0	0	5	1	0
12	GK	(Brunei) Haimie Abdullah Nyaring	2	0	0	0	0	0	0	0	0	2	0	0
14	DF	(Brunei) Martin Haddy Khallidden	1	0	0	0	0	0	0	0	0	1	0	0
16	MF	(Brunei) Abdul Hariz Herman	1	0	0	0	0	0	0	0	0	1	0	0
17	FW	(Brunei) Hakeme Yazid Said	2	0	0	0	0	0	0	0	0	2	0	0
18	DF	(Malaysia) Fairuz Zakaria	2	0	2	1	0	0	0	0	0	3	0	2
19	DF	(Brunei) Nurikhwan Othman	1	0	0	0	0	0	0	0	0	1	0	0
20	MF	(Ghana) Prosper Boakye Owusu	4	0	0	0	0	0	0	0	0	4	0	0
22	FW	(Brunei) Nazirrudin Ismail	2	0	0	1	0	0	0	0	0	3	0	0
23	DF	(Brunei) Yura Indera Putera	0	0	0	0	0	0	1	0	0	1	0	0
24	GK	(Brazil) Michel	2	0	0	0	0	0	0	0	0	2	0	0
26	MF	(Ghana) Ibrahim Sulley	3	0	0	0	0	0	0	0	0	3	0	0
27	FW	(Australia) Jordan Murray	2	0	0	0	0	0	0	0	0	2	0	0
28	FW	(Malaysia) Syafiq Ahmad	2	0	0	1	0	0	1	0	0	4	0	0
	HC	(Scotland) Jamie McAllister	2	0	0	0	0	0	0	0	0	2	0	0
	GC	(Brazil) Leandro Silva	1	0	0	0	0	0	0	0	0	1	0	0
Totals			45	2	5	5	0	1	7	0	0	56	2	6
