= 2026–27 Premier League (disambiguation) =

The 2026–27 Premier League is a professional association football league season in England.

2026–27 Premier League may also refer to:

== Association football ==
- 2026–27 Armenian Premier League
- 2026–27 Azerbaijan Premier League
- 2026–27 Bangladesh Premier League
- 2026–27 Premier League of Bosnia and Herzegovina
- 2026–27 Cambodian Premier League
- 2026–27 Egyptian Premier League
- 2026–27 Ghana Premier League
- 2026–27 Hong Kong Premier League
- 2026–27 Israeli Premier League
- 2026–27 Lebanese Premier League
- 2026–27 Maltese Premier League
- 2026–27 Namibia Premier League
- 2026–27 Russian Premier League
- 2026–27 Ukrainian Premier League
- 2026–27 Welsh Premier League

== Basketball ==
- 2026–27 Israeli Basketball Premier League
