= Hearts of Oak =

Hearts of Oak may refer to:

- "Heart of Oak", the official march of the Royal Navy and other navies
- Hearts of Oak (New York militia), a volunteer military unit formed during the American Revolutionary War
- Hearts of Oak (Ireland), an agrarian protest society in the province of Ulster, Ireland
- Hearts of Oak (1803 play), a play by John Till Allingham
- Hearts of Oak (1879 play), a play by James Herne and David Belasco
- Hearts of Oak (1914 film), a 1914 film directed by Wray Physioc
- Hearts of Oak (film), a 1924 film directed by John Ford
- Heart of Oak (film), a 2022 film directed by Laurent Charbonnier and Michel Seydoux
- Hearts of Oak (album), an album by Ted Leo and the Pharmacists
- Hearts of Oak Benefit Society, a 19th-century British benefit society
- Hearts of Oak Friendly Society, a British friendly society and successor to the benefit society
- Accra Hearts of Oak S.C., a football (soccer) club from Ghana
- Hearts of Oak (supporters group), a football (soccer) supporters group for New York City Football Club
- HMS Heart of Oak, one of three vessels named Heart of Oak that served the British Royal Navy
- Hearts of Oak (campaign group), a far-right campaign group founded by Tommy Robinson
- Hearts of Oak (painting), a painting by James Clarke Hook
