= Syafiq Ahmad =

Malaysian footballer

Personal information
- Full name: Muhammad Syafiq bin Ahmad
- Date of birth: 28 June 1995 (age 31)
- Place of birth: Sungai Ara, Penang, Malaysia
- Height: 1.75 m (5 ft 9 in)
- Position: Forward

Team information
- Current team: Kuala Lumpur City
- Number: 7

Youth career
- 2012–2014: Kedah Darul Aman

Senior career*
Years	Team	Apps	(Gls)
2013–2017	Kedah Darul Aman	62	(12)
2018–2025	Johor Darul Ta'zim	39	(7)
2018–2021	Johor Darul Ta'zim II	8	(2)
2022	→ Kedah Darul Aman (loan)	9	(2)
2024–2025	→ Kedah Darul Aman (loan)	13	(2)
2025–2026	DPMM FC	18	(2)
2026–	Kuala Lumpur City	1	(0)

International career^{‡}
2015–2018	Malaysia U23	18	(6)
2017–	Malaysia	51	(11)
Medal record
Men's football
Representing Malaysia
AFF Championship
Runner-up	2018
Malaysia under-23
Sea Games
Silver medal – second place	Sea Games 2017	Football
- * Club domestic league appearances and goals as of 29 August 2026 ‡ National team caps and goals as of 17 November 2026

Muhammad Syafiq bin Ahmad (born 28 June 1995) is a Malaysian professional footballer who plays as a forward for Malaysia Super League club Kuala Lumpur City and the Malaysia national team.

== Early life ==
Syafiq was born and raised in Sungai Ara in the state of Penang, Malaysia. As a child, Syafiq represented his school, Sekolah Menengah Tunku Anum Tunku Abdul Rahman, in tournaments under the age of 15 and 18.

== Club career ==
=== Kedah Darul Aman ===
Syafiq made his debut in 2013 with Kedah on 20 August 2013 against LionsXII in a 2013 Malaysia Cup match. He came in from the bench on the 81st minute. His first Malaysia Premier League start is against Perlis on 24 January 2014 where Kedah won 4–1. On 16 May 2014, he scored his first league goal against Felda United, which was also the winning goal.

=== Johor Darul Ta'zim ===
On 19 December 2017, Syafiq was signed by Malaysian giants Johor Darul Ta'zim in December. He made his debut in the 2018 AFC Champions League qualifying play-offs against Thailand club, Muangthong United on 23 January 2018.

On 8 May 2019, Syafiq scored the only goal in the home match during the 2019 AFC Champions League group stage match against J1 League club, Kashima Antlers, which gave JDT the 3 points and also their first time that they have beaten a Japanese side.

==== Loan to Kedah Darul Aman ====
On 26 December 2021, Syafiq was loaned out to his former club ahead of the 2022 Malaysia Super League season. He went on to have a solid form throughout the season, where on 15 June 2022, JDT cut short his loan due to his impressive work rate.

On 5 March 2024, Syafiq once again returned to Kedah Darul Aman on loan ahead of the 2024–25 Malaysia Super League season.

=== Brunei DPMM FC ===
On 17 July 2025, the Bruneian side DPMM FC announced the signing of Syafiq, after initial interest from Immigration FC. He completed one season with the Bruneian club and was released soon after.

=== Kuala Lumpur City ===
On 19 August 2026, Syafiq was announced to have signed for Kuala Lumpur City, but due to a transfer embargo he was unable to be registered until 29 August, just in time to make his debut against former team DPMM FC in a 1–0 victory.

== International career ==
=== Youth ===
Syafiq participated in the 2015 Southeast Asian Games with Malaysia U-23. He also participated in the 2017 Southeast Asian Games where Malaysia U-23 finished as silver medalists. He also played in the 2018 Asian Games.

=== Senior ===
Syafiq made his debut with the Malaysia senior team in the 2019 AFC Asian Cup qualification against North Korea on 13 November 2017 at the Buriram Stadium. On 27 March 2018, during the 2019 AFC Asian Cup qualification away match against Lebanon, he scored his first senior international goal at the Camille Chamoun Sports City Stadium.

On 5 October 2019, Syafiq scored his first career hat-trick in a 6–0 win during a friendly match against Sri Lanka at the Bukit Jalil National Stadium.

On 11 July 2026, Syafiq was called up by Malaysia interim manager Tan Cheng Hoe for the 25-man final squad list for the 2026 ASEAN Championship. His last appearance for the national team was two years ago, for the 2024 ASEAN Championship.

== Personal life ==
On 6 December 2020, Syafiq was driving when he got into an accident that killed 3 people. His 22 day old son, mother-in-law, and maid all died in the accident. Syafiq, his wife, and their 2-year-old daughter survived the crash.

== Career statistics ==
=== Club ===
As of 29 August 2026

Appearances and goals by club, season and competition
Club	Season	League			Cup (Note: Includes Malaysia FA Cup)		League Cup (Note: Includes Malaysia Cup)		Continental (Note: Includes AFC Champions League and AFC Cup)		Total	
Club	Season	Division	Apps	Goals	Apps	Goals	Apps	Goals	Apps	Goals	Apps	Goals
Kedah	2013	Malaysia Premier League	—		—		6	0	—		6	0
Kedah	2014	Malaysia Premier League	15	1	3	0	6	2	—		24	3
Kedah	2015	Malaysia Premier League	17	6	2	0	7	2	—		26	8
Kedah	2016	Malaysia Super League	19	1	5	0	5	0	—		29	1
Kedah	2017	Malaysia Super League	11	4	4	1	6	1	—		21	6
Kedah	Total		62	12	14	1	30	5	—		106	18
Johor Darul Ta'zim	2018	Malaysia Super League	4	1	1	0	5	0	6	1	16	2
Johor Darul Ta'zim	2019	Malaysia Super League	8	2	1	0	7	4	6	1	22	7
Johor Darul Ta'zim	2020	Malaysia Super League	7	2	0	0	1	0	2	0	10	2
Johor Darul Ta'zim	2021	Malaysia Super League	4	0	—		2	0	1	0	7	0
Johor Darul Ta'zim	2022	Malaysia Super League	9	2	1	0	5	2	0	0	15	4
Johor Darul Ta'zim	2023	Malaysia Super League	7	0	1	1	0	0	0	0	8	1
Johor Darul Ta'zim	Total		39	7	4	1	20	6	15	2	78	16
Johor Darul Ta'zim II	2018	Malaysia Premier League	5	2	—						5	2
Johor Darul Ta'zim II	2021	Malaysia Premier League	3	0	—						3	0
Johor Darul Ta'zim II	Total		8	2	—						8	2
Kedah Darul Aman (loan)	2022	Malaysia Super League	9	2	0	0	—		—		9	2
Kedah Darul Aman (loan)	2024-25	Malaysia Super League	8	2	0	0	—		—		8	2
Kedah Darul Aman (loan)	Total		17	4	0	0	—		—		17	4
DPMM	2025-26	Malaysia Super League	18	2	2	0	4	1	—		24	3
Kuala Lumpur City	2026-27	Malaysia Super League	1	0	0	0	0	0	—		1	0
Career total			145	27	20	2	54	12	15	2	234	43

=== International ===
As of 2 September 2026

Appearances and goals by national team and year
National team	Year	Apps	Goals
Malaysia	2017	1	0
Malaysia	2018	8	3
Malaysia	2019	9	5
Malaysia	2021	10	0
Malaysia	2022	8	2
Malaysia	2023	7	1
Malaysia	2026	6	0
Total		49	11

=== Senior team ===
Scores and results list Malaysia's goal tally first.

No	Date	Venue	Opponent	Score	Result	Competition
1.	27 March 2018	Camille Chamoun Sports City Stadium, Beirut, Lebanon	Lebanon	1–1	1–2	2019 AFC Asian Cup qualification
2.	1 April 2018	Bukit Jalil National Stadium, Kuala Lumpur, Malaysia	Bhutan	7–0	7–0	Friendly
3.	5 July 2018	Kuala Lumpur Stadium, Kuala Lumpur, Malaysia	Fiji	1–0	1–0	Friendly
4.	5 September 2019	Gelora Bung Karno Stadium, Jakarta, Indonesia	Indonesia	2–2	3–2	2022 FIFA World Cup qualification
5.	10 September 2019	Bukit Jalil National Stadium, Kuala Lumpur, Malaysia	United Arab Emirates	1–0	1–2	2022 FIFA World Cup qualification
6.	5 October 2019	Bukit Jalil National Stadium, Kuala Lumpur, Malaysia	Sri Lanka	1–0	6–0	Friendly
7.	5 October 2019	Bukit Jalil National Stadium, Kuala Lumpur, Malaysia	Sri Lanka	5–0	6–0	Friendly
8.	5 October 2019	Bukit Jalil National Stadium, Kuala Lumpur, Malaysia	Sri Lanka	6–0	6–0	Friendly
9.	27 May 2022	Bukit Jalil National Stadium, Kuala Lumpur, Malaysia	Brunei	1–0	4–0	Friendly
10.	14 June 2022	Bukit Jalil National Stadium, Kuala Lumpur, Malaysia	Bangladesh	3–1	4–1	2023 AFC Asian Cup qualification
11.	11 December 2024	Bukit Jalil National Stadium, Kuala Lumpur, Malaysia	Timor-Leste	1–0	3–2	2024 ASEAN Championship

As of 15 August 2018.

Malaysia U-23

#	Date	Venue	Opponent	Score	Goal	Result	Competition
1.	11 June 2015	Bishan Stadium, Singapore	Laos	3–1	1	Win	Football at the 2015 Southeast Asian Games
2.	3 June 2016	Hang Jebat Stadium, Malaysia	Singapore	3–0	1	Win	2016 Nations Cup
3.	6 October 2016	Tuanku Abdul Rahman Stadium, Malaysia	Brunei	2–0	2	Win	Friendly
4.	19 July 2017	National Stadium, Thailand	Indonesia	3–0	1	Win	2018 AFC U-23 Championship qualification
5.	15 August 2018	Jalak Harupat Stadium, Bandung	Kyrgyzstan	3–1	1	Win	2018 Asian Games

== Honours ==
=== Club ===
Kedah

- Malaysia Premier League: 2015
- Malaysian FA Cup: 2017
- Malaysia Cup: 2016
- Malaysia Charity Shield: 2017

Johor Darul Ta'zim

- Malaysia Super League: 2018, 2019, 2020, 2021
- Malaysia Cup: 2019, 2022
- Malaysia Charity Shield: 2019, 2020, 2021, 2023
- Malaysia FA Cup: 2022, 2023

=== International ===
Malaysia U23

- Southeast Asian Games silver medal: 2017

Malaysia

- AFF Championship runner-up: 2018
- King's Cup runner-up: 2022
- Pestabola Merdeka: 2024
