= Prosper Boakye =

Ghanaian footballer (born 2002)

Personal information
- Full name: Prosper Boakye Owusu
- Date of birth: 1 August 2002 (age 24)
- Place of birth: Ghana
- Height: 1.76 m (5 ft 9 in)
- Position: Midfielder

Team information
- Current team: Medeama SC

Youth career
- Rospak
- Medeama

Senior career*
Years	Team	Apps	(Gls)
2021–2023	Medeama	36	(2)
2023–2024	Sirens	24	(1)
2024–	Medeama	24	(0)
2025–2026	→ DPMM (loan)	21	(0)
- * Club domestic league appearances and goals as of 16 October 2026

Prosper Boakye Owusu (born 1 August 2002) is a Ghanaian footballer who plays as a midfielder for Medeama.

== Career ==
=== Medeama SC ===
Boakye is a graduate of the youth setup of Medeama SC, who began playing for the first team at the latter stage of the 2021–22 Ghana Premier League season. He made his debut in a 1–0 win against King Faisal on 30 March 2022. Medeama eventually finished second in the league, behind Asante Kotoko.

In the following season, Boakye was part of the team that won the championship and qualification to the 2023–24 CAF Champions League, playing 23 times. This was Medeama's first ever league title.

=== Sirens FC ===
As part of an agreement with Sirens F.C. of the Maltese Premier League, Medeama transferred Boakye along with eight other players to the Mediterranean island for the 2023–24 season. He was utilised in almost every game by Stephen Damato as the Is-Sireni finished second from bottom of the table, ending in relegation to the 2024–25 Maltese Challenge League.

=== Return to Medeama and loan to Brunei ===
Boakye returned to Medeama for the 2024–25 Ghana Premier League campaign. The team endured spells of inconsistency throughout the season, eventually finishing in eighth place. Although initially promising to stay at Medeama beyond 2025 in Ghana, he then attended a trial in Brunei and secured a season-long loan deal to play for DPMM FC in their return to the Malaysia Super League starting from the 2025–26 campaign. He made his debut for the royalty-owned club as a starter against PDRM FC on 8 August 2025 in a 2–2 draw.

On 22 November 2025, in the away league match against Kuching City, Boakye had pounced on a loose ball after a corner deep in stoppage time to seemingly level the match 1–1, but the goal was disallowed after a controversial VAR decision. He returned to Medeama at the end of the season after featuring in 27 matches in all competitions.

== Career statistics ==
As of 16 October 2026

Club	Season	League			Cup (Note: Includes Ghana FA Cup, Maltese FA Trophy, Malaysia FA Cup)		Other		Total	
Club	Season	Division	Apps	Goals	Apps	Goals	Apps	Goals	Apps	Goals
Medeama	2021–22	Ghana Premier League	13	1	0	0	0	0	13	1
Medeama	2022–23	Ghana Premier League	23	1	0	0	0	0	23	1
Medeama	Total		36	2	0	0	0	0	36	2
Sirens	2023–24	Maltese Premier League	24	1	2	0	0	0	26	1
Medeama	2024–25	Ghana Premier League	21	0	1	0	0	0	22	0
DPMM FC (loan)	2025–26	Malaysia Super League	21	0	2	0	4 (Note: Appearances in Malaysia Cup)	0	27	0
Medeama	2026–27	Ghana Premier League	5	0	0	0	1 (Note: Appearance in Ghana Super Cup)	0	6	0
Career total			107	3	5	0	5	0	117	3

== Honours ==
Medeama

- Ghana Premier League: 2022–23
- Ghana Super Cup: 2026
