= Ebenezer Abban =

Ghanaian footballer

Personal information
- Full name: Ebenezer Abban
- Date of birth: 12 January 1998 (age 28)
- Place of birth: Ghana
- Height: 1.90 m (6 ft 3 in)
- Position: Defender

Team information
- Current team: DPMM FC
- Number: 4

Senior career*
Years	Team	Apps	(Gls)
2020–2026	Heart of Lions	170	(20)
2026–	DPMM	7	(1)

International career^{‡}
2024–	Ghana	2	(0)
2024–2025	Ghana B	3	(0)
- * Club domestic league appearances and goals as of 20 November 2026 ‡ National team caps and goals as of 7 July 2026

Ebenezer Abban (born 12 January 1998) is a Ghanaian professional footballer who plays for Bruneian club DPMM FC of the Malaysia Super League and the Ghana national team as a defender.

== Club career ==
=== Heart of Lions ===
Abban started playing football for Heart of Lions F.C. of Kpando, beginning from 2020 when the club was still in the Ghana Division One Zone 3. He helped his club gain promotion to the Ghana Premier League in the 2022–23 season.

Although Heart of Lions staved off relegation in their first season back in the top flight by one point in 2023–24, Abban stood out for the team by scoring 13 goals from his centre-back position, gaining him his first international experience.

In the following 2024–25 season, the team rose to become title contenders towards the end, and had a say in the result as their final day victory against league leaders Nations enabled Bibiani Gold Stars to become champions, while also gaining second place themselves.

With just one win in their travels all season, Heart of Lions were nearly relegated at the end of the 2025–26 Ghana Premier League, and club captain Abban left the team at its conclusion, having appeared in over 150 games for the Kpando club.

=== DPMM ===
After prolonged interest from Brunei, Abban completed a transfer to Malaysia Super League team DPMM FC in July 2026. He made his debut in a 0–1 away victory over Penang as a second-half substitute.

== International career ==
Abban was first called up for the Black Stars on 17 November 2024 in a 2025 Africa Cup of Nations qualifier against Niger, as a late replacement for Alidu Seidu. He entered the game in the second half as Ghana lost the game 1–2 after an Oumar Sako goal in the dying minutes as well as a missed penalty by Mohammed Kudus immediately after.

Abban was included for the Black Galaxies team for the 2024 African Nations Championship qualification two-legged affair against a similarly home-based Nigeria the following month, playing both games as a starter in a 1–3 aggregate defeat. A year later, he was also in a team of similar criteria that played a friendly in Johannesburg against South Africa which finished 1–0 to the hosts.

In May 2026, Abban received his first full call-up by Carlos Queiroz in a pre-World Cup friendly against Mexico in Puebla. He was introduced in stoppage time as the World Cup hosts played a 2–0 victory against the Black Stars.

== Career statistics ==
As of 20 November 2026

Appearances and goals by club, season and competition
Club	Season	League			Cup (Note: Includes Ghana FA Cup, Malaysia FA Cup)		Other		Total	
Club	Season	Division	Apps	Goals	Apps	Goals	Apps	Goals	Apps	Goals
Heart of Lions	2020–21	Ghana Division One	21	2	0	0	—		21	2
Heart of Lions	2021–22	Ghana Division One	26	1	0	0	—		26	1
Heart of Lions	2022–23	Ghana Division One	29	1	0	0	2 (Note: Appearance(s) in Ghana Division One Super Cup)	2	31	3
Heart of Lions	2023–24	Ghana Premier League	33	13	0	0	—		33	13
Heart of Lions	2024–25	Ghana Premier League	31	1	1	0	—		32	1
Heart of Lions	2025–26	Ghana Premier League	30	2	2	1	—		32	3
Heart of Lions	Heart of Lions total		170	20	3	1	2	2	175	23
DPMM	2026–27	Malaysia Super League	7	1	6	0	0 (Note: Appearance(s) in Malaysia Cup)	0	13	1
Career total			177	21	9	1	2	2	188	24

== Honours ==
=== Team ===
Heart of Lions

- Ghana Division One Zone 3: 2022–23
- Ghana Premier League: 2024–25 (runner-up)

=== Individual ===
- Heart of Lions F.C. Player of the Season: 2023–24
- Ghana Premier League Player of the Month: May-June 2024
