= Haimie Abdullah Nyaring =

Bruneian footballer (born 1998)

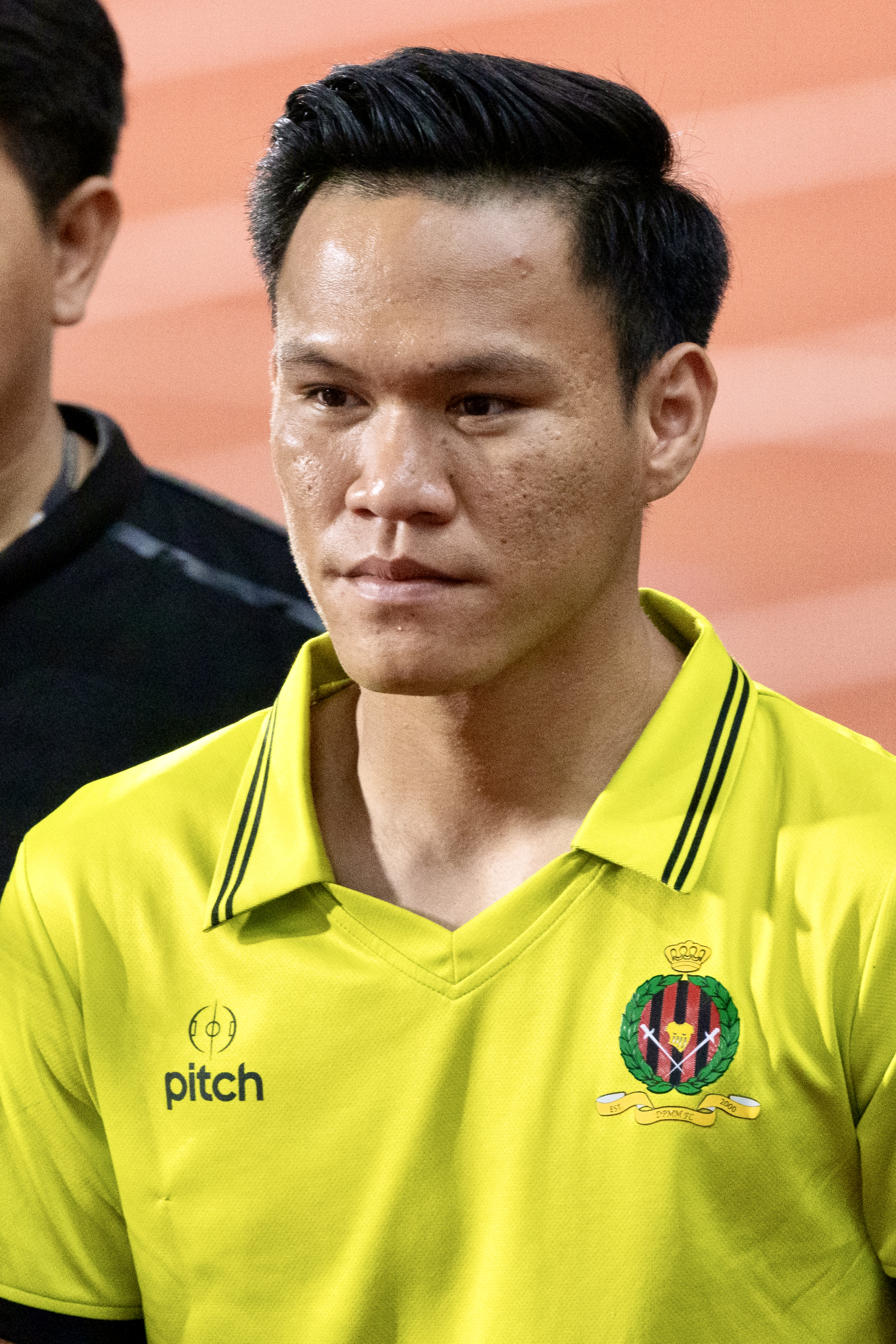
- Haimie with DPMM in 2024

Personal information
- Full name: Muhammad Haimie bin Abdullah Nyaring
- Date of birth: 31 May 1998 (age 28)
- Place of birth: Bangar, Brunei
- Height: 1.75 m (5 ft 9 in)
- Position: Goalkeeper

Team information
- Current team: DPMM FC
- Number: 12

Youth career
- 2013: Muara Vella

Senior career*
Years	Team	Apps	(Gls)
2015	Panchor Murai		(0)
2016	Tabuan U21		(0)
2017	Panchor Murai		(0)
2017–2018	Indera		(0)
2018–2019	DPMM	22	(0)
2021–	DPMM	40	(0)

International career^{‡}
2013	Brunei U15	0	(0)
2017–2019	Brunei U23	12	(0)
2016–	Brunei	34	(0)
- * Club domestic league appearances and goals as of 31 October 2026 ‡ National team caps and goals as of 30 September 2026

Muhammad Haimie bin Abdullah Nyaring (born 31 May 1998), formerly known as Haimie Anak Nyaring, is a Bruneian professional footballer who plays as a goalkeeper for DPMM FC and the Brunei national team.

== Club career ==
=== Early career ===
Haimie was initially a defender in his youth years, even managing to represent Brunei in an under-15 tournament held in Malaysia in June 2013 while playing in that position. He converted into a goalkeeper by the time he was brought in by Panchor Murai FC debuting in the Brunei Premier League in 2015. The following season, Haimie was placed by NFABD to play for Tabuan U21, the league team of the national under-21 side in the Super League. He was largely an understudy to Ishyra Asmin Jabidi in his time there.

Haimie returned to Panchor Murai FC in the first half of 2017, unfortunately his side finished last in the Premier League with only five points from a possible 24. His performances for the national under-23s instigated a move to Indera SC for the second half of the 2017 Super League season, and found regular playing time there. At the end of the season, he became the league's Best Player by helping Indera to third place, despite only at the club halfway through.

=== First DPMM stint ===
In February 2018, Haimie joined Brunei's professional side DPMM FC after impressing new head coach Renê Weber at a pre-season trial. He made his league debut against Home United on 7 April in a 4–2 win, unfortunately scoring an own goal in the 75th minute. On 3 June, he was sent off for violent conduct on Taku Morinaga in the 74th minute during the 5–0 loss against Albirex Niigata (S).

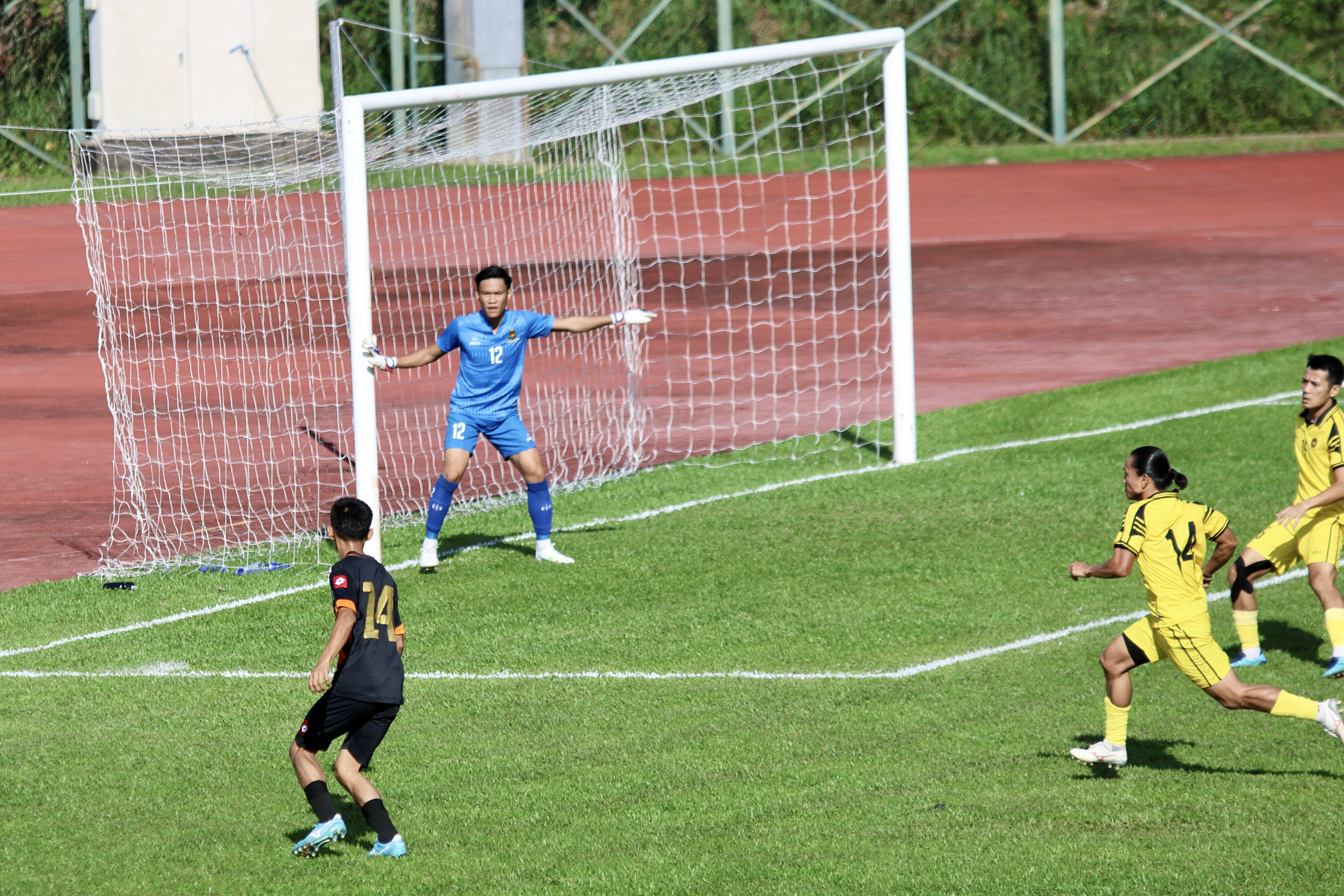
Haimie with DPMM against Kota Ranger during the 2022 FA Cup

Haimie lost his place in the 2019 season after a rejuvenated Wardun Yussof became the captain and undisputed starter for Adrian Pennock. Haimie made his only league appearance on 18 July against Hougang United in a 3–1 loss after Wardun suffered an injury in the warm-up before the game. He also appeared in two Singapore Cup games, including the third-place match against Geylang International on 2 November when after the sides went to penalties after a 2–2 score, Haimie was able to score his spot-kick after all 20 outfield players' attempts have been successful. Immediately after, Andrey Varankow had his penalty saved by Zainol Gulam to leave DPMM in fourth place.

=== Second DPMM stint ===
Haimie left DPMM at the start of 2020 to start a career with the Royal Brunei Police Force. He rejoined the side in June the following year before the 2021 Brunei Super League commenced.

Haimie became the starting goalkeeper for DPMM at the 2022 Brunei FA Cup, winning the trophy after a 2–1 victory over Kasuka FC in the final on 4 December. After returning to the Singapore Premier League in 2023, Haimie alternated between the sticks with Akmal Tursunbaev for Adrian Pennock until the mid-season when the club replaced the Uzbek import goalkeeper with Kristijan Naumovski from North Macedonia who immediately cemented his place as DPMM's starting goalkeeper. It was not until 22 September 2024 when Haimie made the starting lineup against BG Tampines Rovers after Naumovski was suspended for the game. He made a string of impressive saves to help DPMM earn a 3–2 victory at Hassanal Bolkiah National Stadium.

Towards the end of the 24–25 season, Haimie started the last five league games in the absence of Naumovski and managed to be on the winning side for all of them, which meant that he was in goal for half of DPMM's wins all season despite only making seven appearances out of 32 games.

After DPMM transferred to the Malaysia Super League for 2025–26, Haimie made his first start of the season against Kuala Lumpur City on 22 September 2025 when on the 25th minute, he miscontrolled a wayward backpass by Yura Indera Putera to give the away side the lead, and DPMM ended the game in defeat with a 0–4 score. About a week later away against Melaka on 30 September, he saved penalties from Abdul Azim Rahim and Danilo Magalhães and kept a clean sheet, helping DPMM gain their first victory of the league campaign.

On 25 October 2025, Haimie conceded ten goals at the Sultan Ibrahim Stadium in a 10–0 defeat to Johor Darul Ta'zim. Briefly dropped in favour of Michel, he returned to the side at the start of December starting from the game against Immigration on the 7th, in a 4–2 victory. Haimie helped DPMM enjoy a four-match winning streak at the turn of the year, elevating the Brunei side to the top half of the table from initially at rock bottom last November.

== International career ==
=== Youth ===
Haimie was chosen to play the first match of the 2018 AFC U-23 Championship qualification held in Myanmar in July for the Brunei under-23s, against regional giants Australia. He performed admirably, keeping out the Olyroos' 10 chances in the first half alone, before a 53rd-minute penalty by George Blackwood and a Riley McGree strike in the last five minutes sank the Young Wasps to a 2–0 defeat. He drew praise from opposition coach Josep Gombau and subsequently kept his place for the remainder of the tournament.

The following month, the Under-23s competed in the 29th SEA Games held in Kuala Lumpur, Malaysia. Haimie started the opening game of the tournament against the hosts and once again kept the scoreline to a minimum, only conceding twice to the Young Tigers. Two defeats to Myanmar and Laos followed where he let in nine unanswered goals. He was benched for Ishyra in the last deadwood game against Singapore.

=== Senior ===
As part of Tabuan U21, Haimie was invited to train with the full national team for a regional tournament in Sabah, Malaysia in January 2016. The following October, he joined up with the squad yet again for two friendly matches against the Malaysian national under-22 squad.

In December 2017, Haimie was recalled to the national team for the 2017 Aceh World Solidarity Tsunami Cup and played in the 4–0 loss against Indonesia. The next year, he was selected for the 2018 AFF Suzuki Cup qualification matches against Timor-Leste in early September. He gained his first full national team cap on 1 September in the first leg at Kuala Lumpur in a 3–1 loss. He kept a clean sheet in the second leg at home, but the Wasps failed to progress to the tournament proper with only a 1–0 win at Hassanal Bolkiah National Stadium on 8 September.

Haimie played for Brunei U23 at the 2020 AFC U-23 Championship qualification games held in Vietnam, starting against Thailand in the second match on 24 March. He scored an own goal for the final Thai goal of the night in a 0–8 loss. He was also a starter in the following game against Indonesia which finished in a 2–1 defeat for the Young Wasps.

Despite losing his place to Wardun Yussof as the starting goalkeeper for DPMM in the 2019 season, he was the national team starting goalkeeper against Mongolia for the 2022 World Cup qualification matches in June of that year. The Wasps failed to progress to Round 2, losing 2–3 on aggregate.

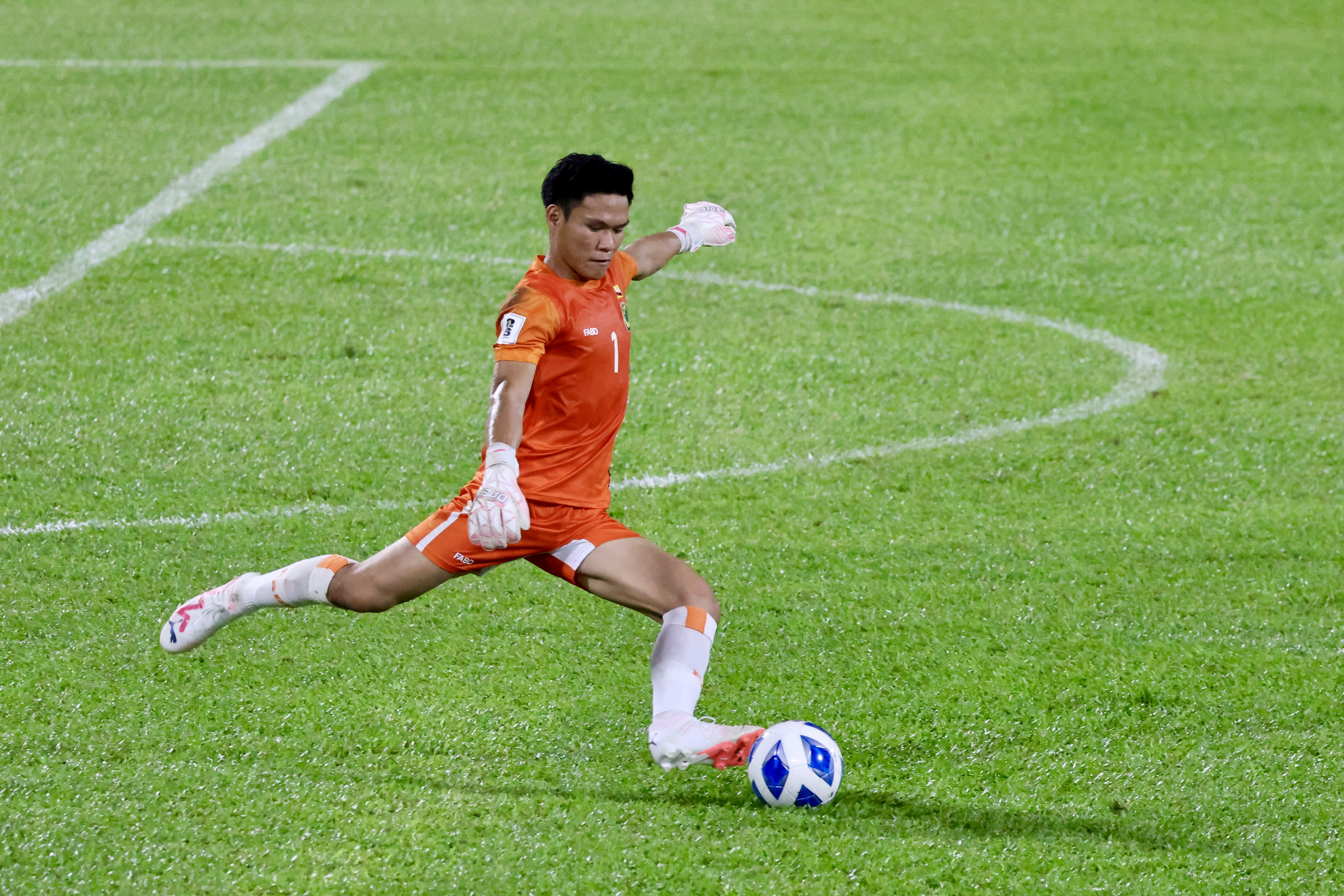
Haimie playing against Indonesia during the 2026 FIFA World Cup qualification

Haimie was selected for the 30th Southeast Asian Games football tournament held in the Philippines on November–December 2019. He played in three out of five matches, including the third game against Laos when he had to be subbed in due to the dismissal of Ishyra Asmin Jabidi.

In 2022, Haimie played in three out of four friendly matches for the national team in preparation for the 2022 AFF Championship qualification, keeping a cleen sheet in the home fixture against Laos on 27 September which ended 1–0 to the Wasps. He started in both legs of the qualifying games against Timor-Leste which was held in Brunei in early November. The Wasps managed to qualify for the tournament proper by a 6–3 win on aggregate. At the regional tournament, Haimie played in all four games and despite conceding 22 goals performed brilliantly throughout, such that head coach Mario Rivera designated him as the captain in the matches against the Philippines and Cambodia.

In 2023, Haimie played for the Wasps against Hong Kong as team captain in an away friendly on 6 June and conceded ten goals. He was then selected by the national team for the 2026 World Cup qualification matches against Indonesia the following October, starting both games in a humbling 0–12 aggregate loss. He was stretchered off in the 70th minute in the second leg at home and was replaced by Ishyra Asmin.

Haimie was Brunei's starting keeper as they managed a three-game winning streak first against Vanuatu at the 2024 FIFA Series in March 2024 and then twice against Sri Lanka where he kept clean sheets for two 1–0 wins at the Hassanal Bolkiah National Stadium in June 2024. He stretched his clean sheet record to four at the play-offs for a spot at the third round of the 2027 Asian Cup qualifying against Macau the following September where Brunei went through 4–0 on aggregate. Just one month later at the 2024 ASEAN Championship qualification first leg in Brunei, Haimie conceded to Gali Freitas of Timor-Leste just minutes after the restart and this solitary goal was enough to eliminate the Wasps from the 2024 ASEAN Championship.

On 25 March 2025, Haimie gained his 25th international cap away against Lebanon in the first fixture of the 2027 AFC Asian Cup qualifying tournament which was played on neutral ground in Doha, Qatar. The Middle Eastern team won 5–0. In the second game of the tournament against Bhutan the following June, Haimie was in goal for Brunei's 2–1 win at Bandar Seri Begawan. Although Brunei lost the third group match against Yemen at home on 9 October, Haimie kept the score low with several important saves, the match ending 0–2. In the following month, Brunei faced Lebanon at home in the fifth fixture of the qualifying campaign, and despite going down 0–3 in the end, Haimie made a penalty save against in-form Lebanese striker Samy Merheg. The final fixture saw the Wasps taking on Bhutan in March 2026, and Haimie conceded twice to their record goalscorer Chencho Gyeltshen in a 2–1 loss.

Haimie was selected for the 2026 ASEAN Championship qualification in June 2026, but conceded six goals over two games against Timor-Leste which meant the Wasps failed to qualify for the tournament proper for the second consecutive time. Three months later, he was Brunei's keeper at the 2026 FIFA ASEAN Cup where in their second group game against co-hosts Hong Kong on 30 September, he made a multitude of saves to restrict their opponents to score only two goals.

== Honours ==
=== Team ===
DPMM FC

- Singapore Premier League: 2019
- Brunei FA Cup: 2022

=== Individual ===
- 2017–18 Brunei Super League Best Player
