= Jefferson Baiano =

Brazilian footballer

Personal information
- Full name: Jefferson Silva dos Santos
- Date of birth: 10 May 1995 (age 31)
- Place of birth: Salvador, Brazil
- Height: 1.86 m (6 ft 1 in)
- Position: Forward

Team information
- Current team: DPMM FC II
- Number: 22

Senior career*
Years	Team	Apps	(Gls)
2014–2015	Galícia	3	(0)
2015–2016	Jacuipense		
2016	Tabocas	14	(5)
2016–2021	Santa Rita	5	(1)
2016	→ ASA (loan)	5	(1)
2016	→ RB Bragantino (loan)	2	(0)
2016–2017	→ ASA (loan)	12	(2)
2017	→ Hercílio Luz (loan)	17	(5)
2018	→ Mito HollyHock (loan)	34	(11)
2019	→ Montedio Yamagata (loan)	34	(7)
2020	→ Al-Mujazzal (loan)	1	(0)
2020	→ Bucheon (loan)	11	(1)
2021	Al Hala SC		(1)
2022	Hoang Anh Gia Lai	2	(0)
2022	Arraial do Cabo	0	(0)
2023–2025	Zweigen Kanazawa	12	(0)
2025	Jacuipense	6	(0)
2025	Fluminense de Feira	3	(0)
2025	Nacional de Muriaé	3	(1)
2025	Abu Muslim	1	(0)
2026	Lagarto	9	(1)
2026–	DPMM II	3	(7)
- * Club domestic league appearances and goals as of 25 October 2026

Jefferson Silva dos Santos (born May 10, 1995), better known as Jefferson Baiano, is a Brazilian professional footballer who plays as a forward for DPMM FC II of the Brunei Super League.

== Career ==
On 7 February 2018, Baiano abroad to Japan and signed to J2 club, Mito HollyHock on loan. He scored a team high 11 goals, but he left from Mito after a season at his club.

On 24 December 2018, Baiano was loaned again to J2 club, Montedio Yamagata from 2019. but, he left from the club after a season in Yamagata.

On 25 December 2022, Baiano return to Japan after two years and announcement officially transfer to J2 club, Zweigen Kanazawa from CE Arraial do Cabo for upcoming 2023 season, previously he played with 2 different teams in J2 League, Mito HollyHock and Montedio Yamagata in 2018 and 2019 respectively.

== Career statistics ==
Updated to the start from 2023 season.

=== Club ===
Club performance			League		Cup		League Cup		Total	
Season	Club	League	Apps	Goals	Apps	Goals	Apps	Goals	Apps	Goals
Japan			League		Emperor's Cup		J.League Cup		Total	
2018	Mito HollyHock	J2 League	34	11	1	1	-		35	12
2019	Montedio Yamagata	J2 League	34	7	1	0	-		0	0
2023	Zweigen Kanazawa	J2 League	0	0	0	0	-		0	0
Career total			68	18	2	1	0	0	70	19
