= Muhammad Toha (footballer) =

Indonesian footballer

Personal information
- Full name: Muhammad Toha
- Date of birth: 30 January 1997 (age 29)
- Place of birth: Bontang, Indonesia
- Height: 1.70 m (5 ft 7 in)
- Position: Right-back

Team information
- Current team: DPMM
- Number: 11

Youth career
- 2013–2014: Diklat Mandau
- 2014–2015: Pro Duta

Senior career*
Years	Team	Apps	(Gls)
2017–2026	Persita Tangerang	228	(2)
2026–	DPMM	7	(0)
- * Club domestic league appearances and goals as of 20 November 2026

Muhammad Toha (born 30 January 1997) is an Indonesian professional footballer who plays as a right-back for Malaysia Super League club DPMM.

== Club career ==
=== Persita Tangerang ===
Toha was signed for Persita Tangerang to play in Liga 2 in the 2017 season. He had to give up his job as a municipal police to pursue his dream as a professional footballer. He scored his first goal through an equalizer in a 4–4 draw against Blitar Bandung United on 13 August 2019. He had a major role in Persita's promotion to Liga 1 in 2020, as he was one of the players who had the most minutes for them in the previous season.

On 7 January 2020, Persita's management announced that Toha and 11 other players have extended their contracts with Persita for the next season. On 1 March 2020, he made his top level debut by starting in a 0–0 draw over Bali United at Kapten I Wayan Dipta Stadium. He played 3 times for the club in 2020 Liga 1 because the league was officially discontinued due to the COVID-19 pandemic.

On 28 August 2021, Toha started for Persita in the 2021–22 Liga 1 in a 1–2 win over Persipura Jayapura. On 22 October, he captained Persita for the first time against Persikabo 1973. He ended the 2021–22 season with 34 league appearances and 1 assists.

On 25 July 2022, Toha started the season as club captain in a 2–0 win over Persik Kediri. On 14 August, he made his 100th appearance for the club as Persita won 1–2 at Persis Solo. Toha give two assists in Persita's 4–1 win over RANS Nusantara on 13 December.

In June 2026, Persita officially announced that Toha will be leaving the team. After nearly a decade as a key player and team captain, he has decided to end his time with Persita and continue his career abroad next season. In the 2025–26 season, Toha continued to perform consistently, making 30 appearances under coach Carlos Peña. Overall, he has made more than 200 competitive appearances for Persita Tangerang in various official competitions.

=== DPMM ===
On 8 July 2026, Toha moved abroad for the first time in his career, signing a contract with Malaysia Super League side DPMM of Brunei for the 2026–27 season. He debuted for his new team on 3 August against Penang in a 0–1 win.

== Career statistics ==
=== Club ===
As of match played 20 November 2026

Club	Season	League			Cup (Note: Includes Piala Indonesia, Malaysia FA Cup)		Continental		Other		Total	
Club	Season	Division	Apps	Goals	Apps	Goals	Apps	Goals	Apps	Goals	Apps	Goals
Persita Tangerang	2017	Liga 2	6	0	0	0	–		0	0	6	0
Persita Tangerang	2018	Liga 2	29	0	0	0	–		0	0	29	0
Persita Tangerang	2019	Liga 2	27	1	0	0	–		0	0	27	1
Persita Tangerang	2020	Liga 1	3	0	0	0	–		0	0	3	0
Persita Tangerang	2021–22	Liga 1	34	0	0	0	–		3 (Note: Appearances in Menpora Cup)	0	37	0
Persita Tangerang	2022–23	Liga 1	33	0	0	0	–		4 (Note: Appearances in Indonesia President's Cup)	0	37	0
Persita Tangerang	2023–24	Liga 1	33	0	0	0	–		0	0	33	0
Persita Tangerang	2024–25	Liga 1	33	1	0	0	–		0	0	33	1
Persita Tangerang	2025–26	Super League	30	0	0	0	–		0	0	30	0
Persita Tangerang	Persita total		228	2	0	0	0	0	7	0	235	2
DPMM	2026–27	Malaysia Super League	7	0	6	0	–		3 (Note: Appearances in Malaysia Cup)	0	16	0
Career total			235	2	6	0	0	0	10	0	251	2

== Honours ==
=== Club ===
Persita Tangerang

- Liga 2 runner-up: 2019
