= HMS Heart of Oak =

At least three vessels have served the Royal Navy under the name Heart of Oak after the song Heart of Oak:

- Heart of Oak (1762 ship) was a mercantile vessel launched in 1762 that served as an armed ship between 1777 and 1782.
- HMS Heart of Oak (1794) was a mercantile vessel that the Navy purchased in 1794, fitted and commissioned as a fireship, but then sold in 1796. She was of 5363/94 tons (bm), and may have been the Heart of Oak of 56 tons (bm) launched at Dartmouth in 1786.
- Heart of Oak was one of 19 barges that the Royal Navy hired in July 1801 for three months and armed as gunbarges. She served from 25 July 1801 until 24 October.

See also:HMS Royal Oak
