= 2026–27 Ghana Premier League =

70th Ghana football league season

Ghana Premier League
- Season: 2026–27
- Dates: 5 September 2026 – May 2027
- Matches: 99
- Goals: 196 (1.98 per match)
- Biggest home win: Hearts of Oak 4–0 Berekum Chelsea (6 September 2026)
- Highest scoring: Bechem United 4–2 Vision (11 October 2026)
- Longest winning run: Medeama (4 matches)
- Longest unbeaten run: Medeama (6 matches)
- Longest winless run: Dreams (8 matches)
- All statistics correct as of 17 November 2026.

The 2026–27 Ghana Premier League is the 71st season of the Ghana Premier League, the top-tier football league in Ghana that began on 5 September 2026 and will end in May 2027.

== Teams ==
This season's league consisted of 18 teams – the top 15 teams from the previous season, and three teams promoted from the previous season's Division One League.

=== Promotion and relegation ===
| ▲ Promoted from 2025–26 Division One League | ▼ Relegated to 2026–27 Division One League |
|---|---|
| Debibi United; Port City FC; Ashanti Gold S.C. | Nations FC; Hohoe United (Note: Withdrew before the season concluded and subsequently banned from the Ghana league system for 3 seasons.); Eleven Wonders |

=== Stadiums and locations ===
| Team | Location | Venue | Capacity |
|---|---|---|---|
| Aduana FC | Dormaa | Agyeman Badu Stadium | 7,000 |
| All Black | Swedru | Swedru Sports Stadium | 5,000 |
| Asante Kotoko | Kumasi | Baba Yara Stadium | 40,528 |
| Ashanti Gold SC 04 | Obuasi | Len Clay Stadium | 7,000 |
| Basake Holy Stars | Ainyinase | CAM Park | 5,000 |
| Bechem United | Bechem | Nana Gyeabour's Park | 5,000 |
| Berekum Chelsea | Berekum | Berekum Sports Stadium | 5,000 |
| Bibiani Goldstars | Bibiani | Dun's Park | 7,000 |
| Dreams | Dawu | Tuba AstroTurf Park | 5,000 |
| Debibi United | Obuasi | Len Clay Stadium | 7,000 |
| Port City FC | Takoradi | Essipong Stadium | 5,000 |
| Hearts of Oak | Accra | Legon Sports Stadium | 11,000 |
| Karela United | Nalerigu | Naa Sheriga Sports Complex | 1,000 |
| Medeama | Tarkwa | TNA Park | 15,000 |
| Heart of Lions | Kpando | Kpando Stadium | 5,000 |
| Samartex | Samreboi | Nsenkyire Sports Arena | 7,000 |
| Vision FC | Tema | Nii Adjei Kraku II Sports Complex | 2,500 |
| Young Apostles FC | Wenchi | Wenchi Sports Stadium | 1,000 |

== League table ==
| Pos | Team | Pld | W | D | L | GF | GA | GD | Pts | Qualification or relegation |
|---|---|---|---|---|---|---|---|---|---|---|
| 1 | Medeama | 11 | 7 | 3 | 1 | 18 | 9 | +9 | 24 | Qualification for the Champions League |
| 2 | Hearts of Oak | 11 | 6 | 3 | 2 | 12 | 3 | +9 | 21 | |
| 3 | Port City FC | 11 | 6 | 3 | 2 | 15 | 8 | +7 | 21 | |
| 4 | Samartex | 11 | 5 | 4 | 2 | 11 | 7 | +4 | 19 | |
| 5 | Bechem United | 11 | 6 | 1 | 4 | 15 | 12 | +3 | 19 | |
| 6 | Ashantigold SC 04 | 11 | 5 | 3 | 3 | 13 | 10 | +3 | 18 | |
| 7 | Aduana | 11 | 5 | 2 | 4 | 9 | 6 | +3 | 17 | |
| 8 | All Blacks | 11 | 4 | 3 | 4 | 9 | 8 | +1 | 15 | |
| 9 | Berekum Chelsea | 11 | 4 | 3 | 4 | 12 | 12 | 0 | 15 | |
| 10 | Holy Stars | 11 | 5 | 0 | 6 | 6 | 10 | −4 | 15 | |
| 11 | Asante Kotoko | 11 | 3 | 5 | 3 | 11 | 12 | −1 | 14 | |
| 12 | Bibiani GoldStars | 11 | 3 | 3 | 5 | 8 | 10 | −2 | 12 | |
| 13 | Vision | 11 | 2 | 5 | 4 | 11 | 12 | −1 | 11 | |
| 14 | Karela | 11 | 3 | 2 | 6 | 8 | 12 | −4 | 11 | |
| 15 | Debibi United | 11 | 3 | 2 | 6 | 10 | 16 | −6 | 11 | |
| 16 | Heart of Lions | 11 | 3 | 2 | 6 | 11 | 18 | −7 | 11 | Relegation to Division One League |
| 17 | Dreams | 11 | 2 | 4 | 5 | 11 | 16 | −5 | 10 | Relegation to Division One League |
| 18 | Young Apostles | 11 | 2 | 2 | 7 | 6 | 15 | −9 | 8 | Relegation to Division One League |

Updated to match(es) played on 15 November 2026. Source: Premier League, Flashscore, livescore
Rules for classification: 1) Points; 2) Goal difference; 3) Goals scored; 4) Head-to-head points; 5) Head-to-head goal difference; 6) Head-to-head goal scored; 7) Play-off

== Results ==
| Home \ Away | MED | SAM | PCT | ADU | HOS | HEA | HOL | ASA | ASH | BEC | VIS | KAR | ALL | DBI | BIB | BER | YOU | DRE |
|---|---|---|---|---|---|---|---|---|---|---|---|---|---|---|---|---|---|---|
| Medeama | | | 1–0 | 1–0 | 4–1 | | 3–1 | | | | | | 1–0 | | | | | |
| Samartex | 2–1 | | | | | 0–0 | | 1–1 | | | | 3–1 | | | 1–0 | | 1–0 | |
| Port City FC | | | | | 1–0 | | | | 1–1 | 3–1 | | | | | | 2–1 | | 1–1 |
| Aduana | | 0–1 | | | | | | | 1–0 | 0–1 | | 2–1 | 2–1 | | | 2–0 | | |
| Holy Stars | | | | | | | | | 1–0 | 1–0 | 1–0 | | 1–0 | | | 1–0 | | 0–1 |
| Hearts of Oak | | | 1–0 | | 1–0 | | 3–0 | | | 0–0 | | | | | | 4–0 | | |
| Heart of Lions | | | | 0–0 | | | | | 3–2 | 2–1 | | | 0–0 | | | 0–2 | | 1–2 |
| Asante Kotoko | 1–1 | | | 0–2 | | | 2–1 | | | | | 1–0 | | | 0–0 | | 2–1 | |
| Ashantigold SC 04 | | 1–0 | | | | | | 1–1 | | | 3–1 | 1–0 | | 2–1 | | | 0–0 | |
| Bechem United | | 2–1 | | | | | | | | | 4–2 | | | 3–0 | 1–0 | | | 1–0 |
| Vision | 1–1 | | 0–0 | | | 0–1 | | | | | | | | | 0–0 | | 3–0 | |
| Karela | | | 1–2 | | | 1–0 | | | | 3–1 | 0–0 | | | | | | | 1–0 |
| All Blacks | | 1–1 | | | | | | 1–0 | 1–2 | | | 2–0 | | 1–0 | | 0–0 | | |
| Debibi United | 0–1 | | 1–3 | | | 1–0 | | 2–2 | | | | | | | 1–0 | | 3–0 | |
| Bibiani GoldStars | | | 0–2 | 0–0 | 2–0 | 1–2 | 2–1 | | | | | | | | | | | |
| Berekum Chelsea | | 0–0 | | | | | | 2–1 | | | 1–1 | | | 3–0 | | | | 3–1 |
| Young Apostles | 1–2 | | | 1–0 | 1–0 | | 1–2 | | | | | 0–0 | 1–2 | | | | | |
| Dreams | 2–2 | | | | | 0–0 | | | | | 1–3 | | | 1–1 | 2–3 | | | |

Updated to match(es) played on 15 November 2026. Source: Premier League, Flashscore, livescore
Legend: Blue = home team win; Yellow = draw; Red = away team win.
