= Jordan Rodrigues (footballer) =

Brazilian footballer (born 1998)

Personal information
- Full name: Jordan de Paula Rodrigues
- Date of birth: 22 March 1998 (age 28)
- Place of birth: Alto do Rio Doce, Brazil
- Height: 1.88 m (6 ft 2 in)
- Position: Defender

Team information
- Current team: Al Ittihad Ahli
- Number: 3

Youth career
- 2017–2019: Madureira

Senior career*
| Years | Team | Apps | (Gls) |
| 2018–2020 | Madureira | 0 | (0) |
| 2019 | → Mesquita (loan) | 9 | (1) |
| 2020 | Goytacaz | 7 | (0) |
| 2021 | Americano | 2 | (0) |
| 2021 | Perilima | 6 | (0) |
| 2021 | Goytacaz | 10 | (0) |
| 2022 | Rio Branco-ES | 11 | (3) |
| 2022 | Grêmio Anápolis | 10 | (0) |
| 2022 | Jaraguá | 6 | (2) |
| 2023 | Gangneung Citizen | 5 | (0) |
| 2024 | CEOV | 9 | (0) |
| 2024 | Centro Oeste | 11 | (0) |
| 2025 | Rio Branco-SP | 17 | (1) |
| 2025 | Taubaté | 0 | (0) |
| 2025–2026 | DPMM | 22 | (3) |
| 2026– | Al Ittihad Ahli | 0 | (0) |
- * Club domestic league appearances and goals as of 7 August 2026

Jordan de Paula Rodrigues (born 22 March 1998) is a Brazilian footballer who plays for Al Ittihad Ahli of Aleppo SC as a defender.

== Career ==
Rodrigues trained at Madureira EC in his youth years. After spending his formative years playing in the lower leagues of Brazil, he was signed by Gangneung Citizen of the K3 League for the 2023 season and made five league appearances. He transferred to CE Operário-VG at the end of 2023. Four months later, he moved to Centro Oeste Futebol Clube of the Campeonato Goiano Second Division.

At the start of 2025, Rodrigues moved to Rio Branco EC of São Paulo, newly promoted to the Campeonato Paulista Série A3. He helped Rio Branco finish in sixth place, qualifying them to the knockout stage of the competition, where they were beaten in the semi-finals by Monte Azul which denied them a consecutive promotion to the A2.

Despite signing for EC Taubaté in May 2025, Rodrigues and teammate Michel took the opportunity to move to Brunei with DPMM FC just two months later after impressing the club's team manager Ali Momin while on a scouting excursion. He made his Malaysia Super League debut on 8 August against PDRM FC in a 2–2 away draw.

On 14 September 2025, Rodrigues was sent off in the 20th minute for violent conduct in the Malaysia FA Cup match against Kuching City in a 7–1 defeat. After serving his suspension, he scored his first goal for DPMM in a 1–2 defeat to Kelantan TRW on the 26th of the same month. Unfortunately he was shown a red card once again four days later in the away fixture against Melaka, although his team won 0–1 in the end.

In the match against Kuching City on 25 April 2026, Jordan scored DPMM's first goal and later in the game conceded a late penalty in a 2–2 draw. After 22 league matches and three goals, Jordan was released by the club at the conclusion of the season.

In August 2026, Jordan signed for Syrian Premier League champions Al Ittihad Ahli. In his first competitive debut for the club on the 12th, he scored the lone goal in the 2026–27 AFC Challenge League preliminary stage match against Bangladesh Police FC.

== Honors ==
Al-Ittihad Ahli

- Syrian Super Cup: 2026
