= Ishyra Asmin Jabidi =

Bruneian footballer (born 1998)

Ishyra Asmin
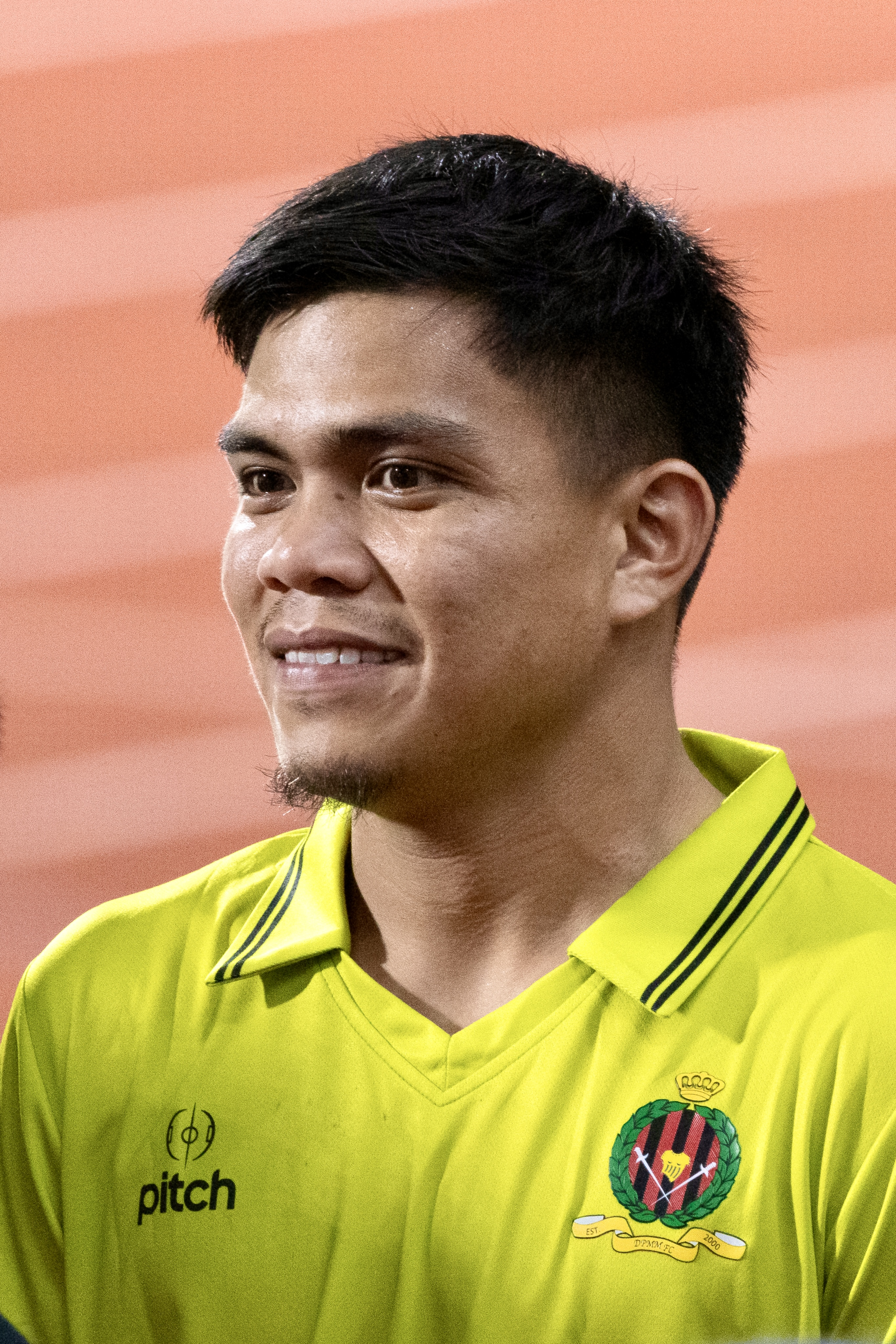
- Ishyra with DPMM in 2024

Personal information
- Full name: Muhammad Ishyra Asmin bin Mohammad Jabidi
- Date of birth: 9 July 1998 (age 28)
- Place of birth: Brunei
- Position: Goalkeeper

Team information
- Current team: DPMM FC
- Number: 25

Youth career
- Sports School
- 2013–2016: Tabuan Muda

Senior career*
Years	Team	Apps	(Gls)
2015	Tabuan U18		
2016	Tabuan U21		
2017	Kasuka		
2018–2019	DPMM	0	(0)
2019	→ Kasuka (loan)		
2021–2024	MS ABDB	3	(0)
2024–	DPMM	0	(0)

International career^{‡}
2013	Brunei U16	4	(0)
2015	Brunei U19	4	(0)
2018	Brunei U21	3	(0)
2017–2019	Brunei U23	5	(0)
2016–	Brunei	5	(0)
- * Club domestic league appearances and goals as of 29 April 2024 ‡ National team caps and goals as of 18 November 2026

Laskar Muhammad Ishyra Asmin bin Mohammad Jabidi (born 9 July 1998) is a Bruneian footballer who plays as a goalkeeper for DPMM FC of the Malaysia Super League and the Brunei national football team.

== Club career ==
Ishyra is a graduate of Brunei Sports School and afterwards IBTE and has been involved with the national youth team setup since 2013. He played for the club sides of the Young Wasps early in his career, namely the Tabuan U18 in 2015 and Tabuan U21 in 2016.

After impressive performances playing as the first choice goalkeeper for Kasuka FC in the 2017–18 Brunei Super League, Ishyra was signed for Brunei's sole professional club DPMM FC at the start of the 2018 S.League. However the team also signed Haimie Anak Nyaring from Indera SC and he became the number one goalkeeper under Renê Weber instead of Ishyra. After failing to appear in any of the games all season, Ishyra was allowed to play for Kasuka in the latter stages of the 2018–19 Brunei Super League, finishing in second place.

After his release from DPMM FC, Ishyra returned to club football for the team of his employers the Royal Brunei Armed Forces, namely MS ABDB in 2021. He made his debut against BSRC FC on 18 July in a 1–1 draw.

At the start of the 2024–25 Singapore Premier League season, Ishyra was re-signed by DPMM FC as understudy to Kristijan Naumovski and Haimie Abdullah Nyaring.

== International career ==
=== Youth ===
Ishyra's first international tournament for the Young Wasps was at the 2014 AFC U-16 Championship qualifying matches held in Laos in September 2013, coinciding with the appointment of Stephen Ng Heng Seng as head coach. After winning the first match against Guam, Brunei suffered heavy defeats to Malaysia, South Korea and Laos. Ishyra's next tournament was the 2015 AFF U-19 Youth Championship held in the same country as his previous outing. The team ended their campaign without a single point.

From July to August 2017, Ishyra was selected for the Brunei Under-23 squad for the double header of the 2015 AFF U-19 Youth Championship in Laos and the 29th SEA Games in Malaysia. He played only one match which was a 1–0 defeat to Singapore in the final group game of the SEA Games tournament, even though he was named Man of the Match.

In April 2018, Ishyra was tasked to be the first choice goalkeeper for the 2018 Hassanal Bolkiah Trophy hosted by his home country. He played three games in total for the Brunei Under-21s as Brunei failed to advance to the knockout stages.

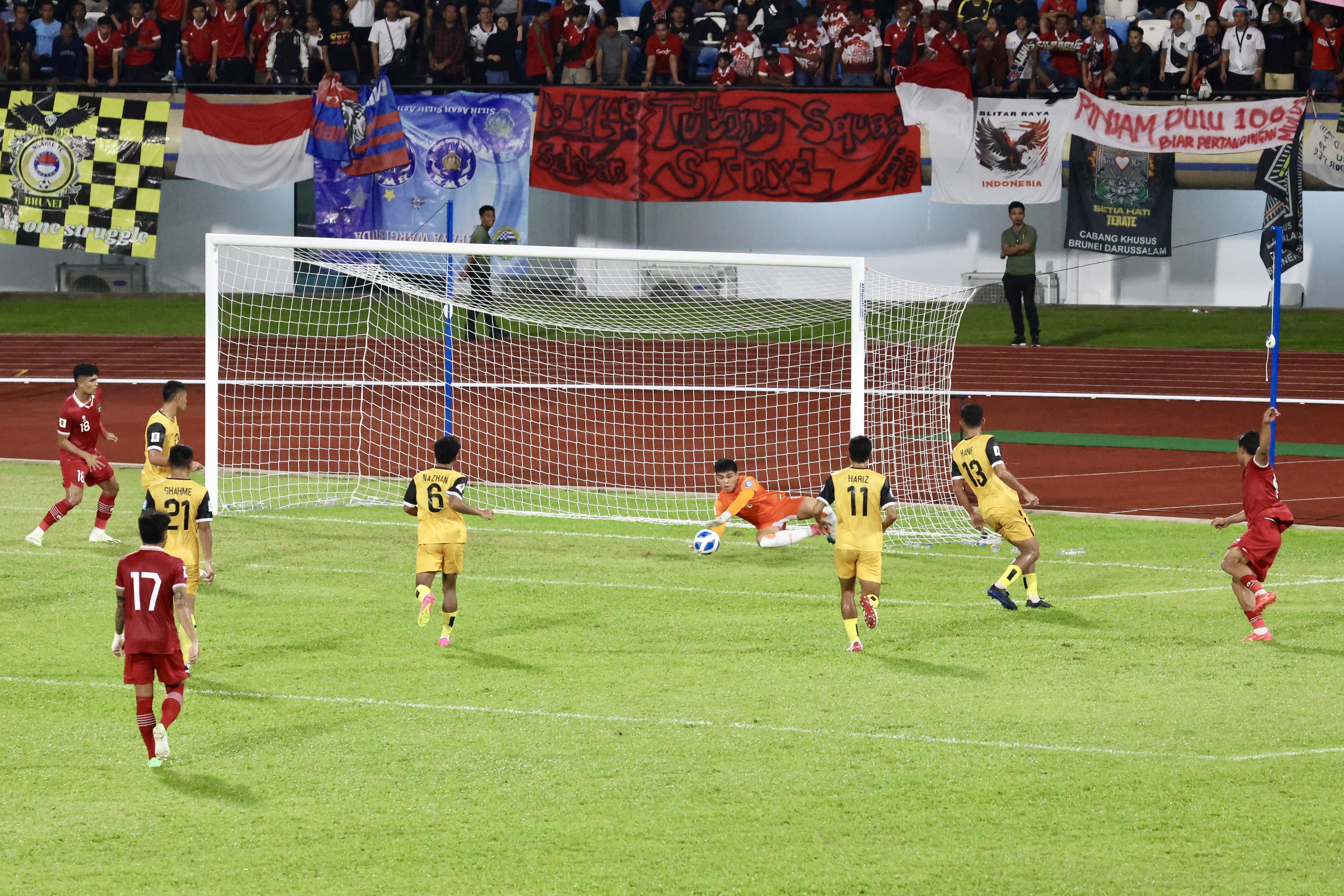
Ishyra playing against Indonesia during the 2026 FIFA World Cup qualification

Ishyra was called up at under-23 level for the 2020 AFC U-23 Championship qualification matches in March that were played in Vietnam. In the first match against the hosts, Ishyra started the game but was replaced by Haimie Anak Nyaring at half-time due to an injury he suffered in the first half. The match finished 6–0 to the home side with both keepers conceding three goals each. At the end of 2019, he was included in the contingent for the 30th SEA Games football tournament held in the Philippines. He started the first group game against Vietnam, conceding six goals. He was dropped for Haimie in the second game but did not fare better as Thailand thumped the Wasps with a 0–7 score. Ishyra was restored to the lineup for the third match against Laos but was dismissed for a professional foul on Somxay Keohanam in the 14th minute, the match ending 3–0 to the Young Elephants. After serving his suspension for the game against Indonesia, he was fielded by coach Aminuddin Jumat for the final group match against Singapore. The team played with 10 men after the dismissal of Hanif Farhan Azman just before the 50-minute mark and lost 0–7, conceding four goals in the last quarter of the hour.

=== Senior ===
Ishyra experienced his first outing with the full national team at a friendly tournament in Sabah, Malaysia in February 2016. In November of the same year, he was selected as one of the backup goalkeepers for the 2016 AFC Solidarity Cup which was also held in Malaysia. A full year later, he was called up for the 2017 Aceh World Solidarity Tsunami Cup in Indonesia. In June 2019, he was made a member of the full national team for the 2022 World Cup and 2023 Asian Cup qualification matches against Mongolia but Haimie was between the posts for both legs.

Ishyra made his full international debut in an away friendly against Laos on 27 March 2022 in a 3–2 defeat. He was selected for the 2022 AFF Mitsubishi Electric Cup that December as the reserve goalkeeper. A year later, he performed the same role at the 2026 World Cup qualification matches against Indonesia. On 17 October in the second leg of the round at Hassanal Bolkiah National Stadium, he replaced Haimie Abdullah Nyaring on the 71st minute after the latter picked up an injury. The match ended 0–6 to the away side.

Ishyra's next appearance for the Wasps was the 2027 AFC Asian Cup qualification match against Yemen on 14 October 2025, conceding nine goals, five of them coming from Nasser Al-Gahwashi.

In November 2026, Ishyra became the starting goalkeeper for Brunei at the 2026 King's Cup. In the semi-final against Thailand on the 14th, Ishyra conceded as early as the third minute when he punched a cross into his own net. The game ended 6–0 to the hosts, and set up the match against Oman on the 17th for third place. Ishyra was kept in goal for the match, and conceded six before letting in a Danial Hariz Syukrin backpass go through him for Oman's seventh and final goal in stoppage time.
