= Michel (footballer, born 2002) =

Brazilian footballer

Personal information
- Full name: Michel Américo dos Santos
- Date of birth: 10 April 2002 (age 24)
- Place of birth: Piracicaba, Brazil
- Height: 1.96 m (6 ft 5 in)
- Position: Goalkeeper

Team information
- Current team: Estrela Clube Primeiro de Maio
- Number: 1

Youth career
- 2020–2023: XV de Piracicaba

Senior career*
Years	Team	Apps	(Gls)
2024	São-Carlense	2	(0)
2024	Kombans	9	(0)
2025	CEOV	0	(0)
2025–2026	Taubaté	0	(0)
2025–2026	→ DPMM (loan)	4	(0)
2026–	1º de Maio	0	(0)
- * Club domestic league appearances and goals as of 15 May 2026

Michel Américo dos Santos (born 10 April 2002), simply known as Michel, is a Brazilian footballer who plays as a goalkeeper for Estrela Clube Primeiro de Maio of Angola.

== Career ==
Michel trained at the youth setup of his local team XV de Piracicaba and moved to Grêmio Desportivo São-Carlense in search of first-team football. After only a handful of matches in the Série A4, Michel took the opportunity to play for Thiruvananthapuram Kombans FC of the Super League Kerala, a newly-established club in India. He was the starting goalkeeper for their first ever football match against Calicut FC on 10 September 2024 in a 1–1 draw. Kombans reached the play-offs after finishing fourth in the regular season with Michel starting almost every match, but were defeated by eventual winners Calicut in the semi-finals with the score of 2–1.

Michel returned to Brazil with Operário-VG at the start of 2025 but spent the majority of his time on the bench. In June, he transferred to EC Taubaté for their Copa Paulista campaign of 2025. His performances at the state cup tournament caught the eye of Ali Momin, the team manager of DPMM FC of Brunei. Ali convinced Michel to play for the Bruneian team in the upcoming Malaysia Super League for an initial six-month loan, which was put pen to paper on 5 August of that year.

Michel finally made his Malaysia Super League bow on 2 November 2025 at home against Negeri Sembilan in a 2–2 draw. After four appearances in the league, he returned to Brazil at the season's end.

On 7 September 2026, Michel was unveiled as the new acquisition for Angola Girabola side Estrela Clube Primeiro de Maio.
